= Prehistoric North Africa =

Prehistory of North African region

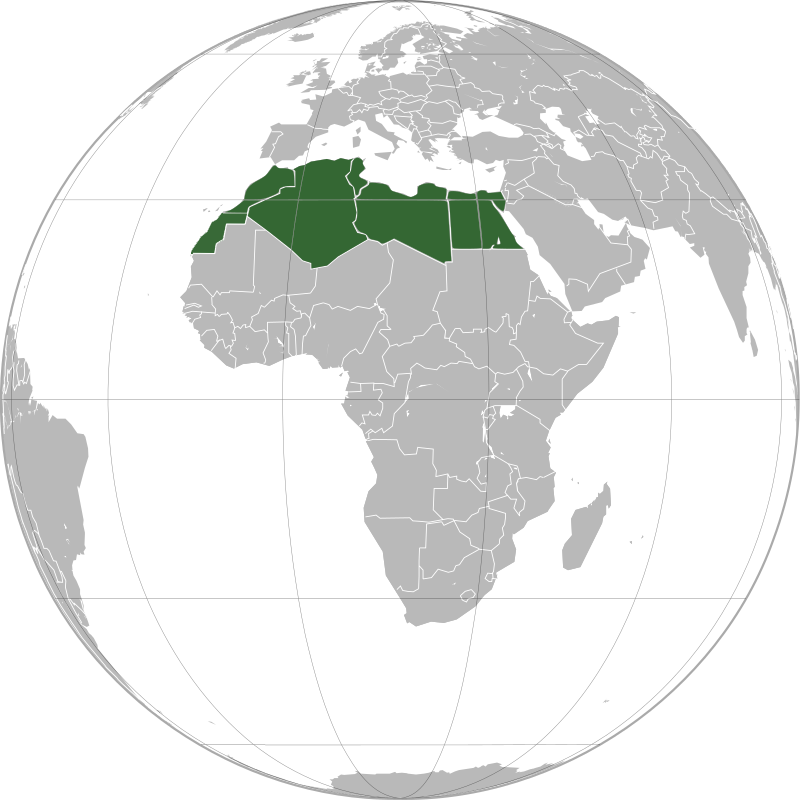
North Africa consists of the six countries or territories situated between the Sahara desert and the Mediterranean: Algeria, Egypt, Libya, Morocco, Tunisia, and Western Sahara. Northern Africa (Note: The disputed territory of Western Sahara (formerly Spanish Sahara) is mostly administered by Morocco; the Polisario Front claims the territory in militating for the establishment of an independent republic, and exercises limited control over rump border territories.)

The prehistory of North Africa spans the period of earliest human presence in the region to gradual onset of historicity in the Maghreb during classical antiquity. Early anatomically modern humans are known to have been present at Jebel Irhoud, in what is now Morocco, approximately 300,000 years ago. The Nile Valley region, via ancient Egypt, contributed to the Neolithic, Bronze Age and Iron Age periods of the Old World, along with the ancient Near East.

== Climate ==
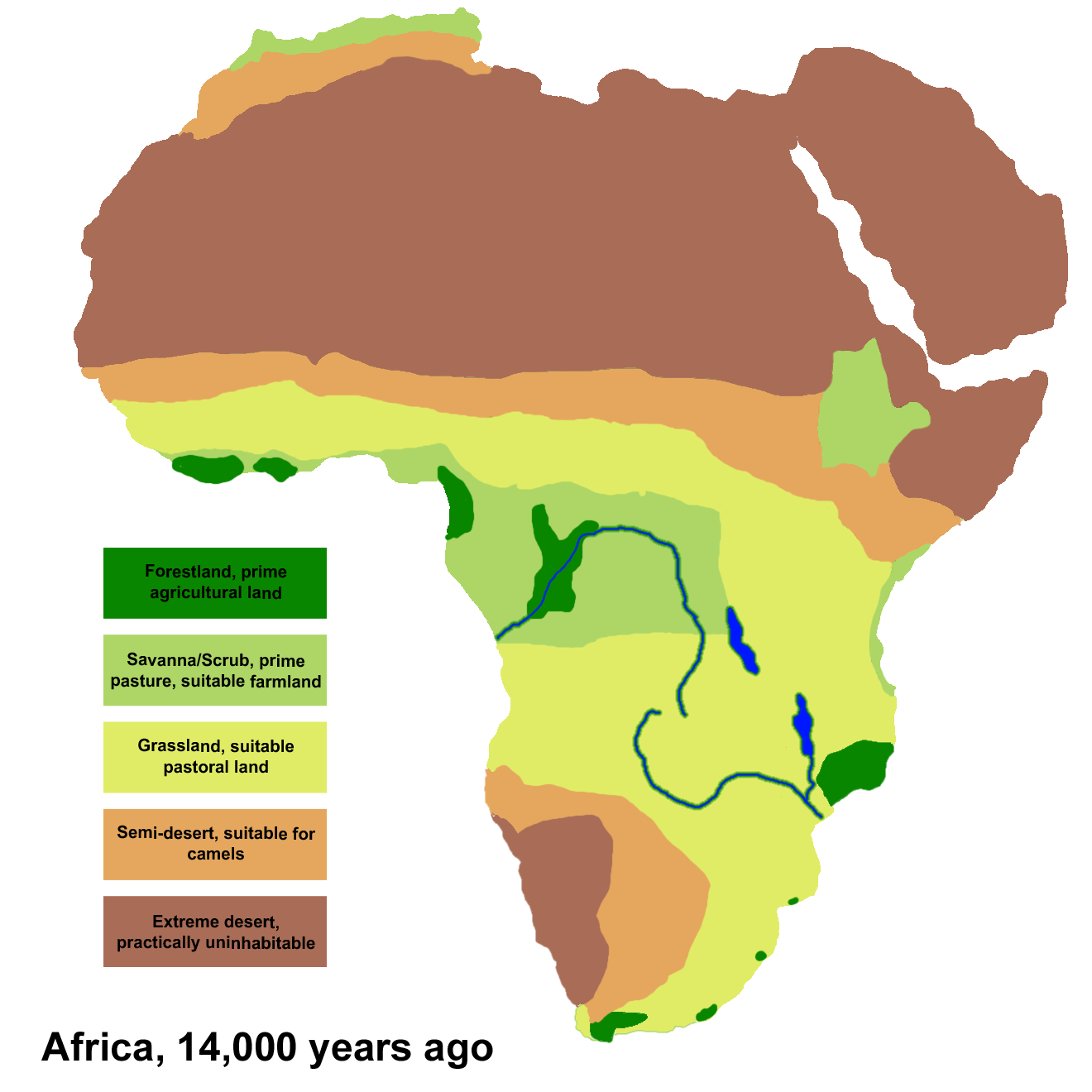
African vegetation during the Last Glacial Maximum (~12,000 BC)

Human habitation in North Africa has been greatly influenced by the climate of the Sahara (currently the world's largest warm desert), which has undergone enormous variations between wet and dry over the last few hundred thousand years. This is due to a 41,000-year Axial tilt cycle in which the tilt of the earth changes between 22° and 24.5°. At present (2000 AD), we are in a dry period, but it is expected that the Sahara will become green again in 15,000 years (17,000 AD).

During the last glacial period, the Sahara was much larger than it is today, extending south beyond its current boundaries. The end of the glacial period brought more rain to the Sahara, from about 8000 BC to 6000 BC, perhaps because of low pressure areas over the collapsing ice sheets to the north. Once the ice sheets were gone, the northern Sahara dried out. In the southern Sahara, the drying trend was initially counteracted by the monsoon, which brought rain further north than it does today. By around 4200 BC, however, the monsoon retreated south to approximately where it is today, leading to the gradual desertification of the Sahara. The Sahara is presently as dry as it was about 13,000 years ago.

These conditions are responsible for what has been called the Sahara pump theory. During periods of a wet or "Green Sahara", the Sahara becomes a savanna grassland and various flora and fauna become more common. Following inter-pluvial arid periods, the Sahara area then reverts to desert conditions and the flora and fauna are forced to retreat northwards to the Atlas Mountains, southwards into West Africa, or eastwards into the Nile Valley. This separates populations of some of the species in areas with different climates, forcing them to adapt, possibly giving rise to allopatric speciation.

== Paleolithic ==
=== Lower Paleolithic ===
The earliest inhabitants of central North Africa have left behind significant remains: early remnants of hominid occupation in North Africa, for example, were found in Ain el Hanech, in Setif (c. 200,000 BC); in fact, more recent investigations have found signs of Oldowan technology, which has been dated between 2,000,000 BC and 1,470,000 BC.

=== Middle Paleolithic ===
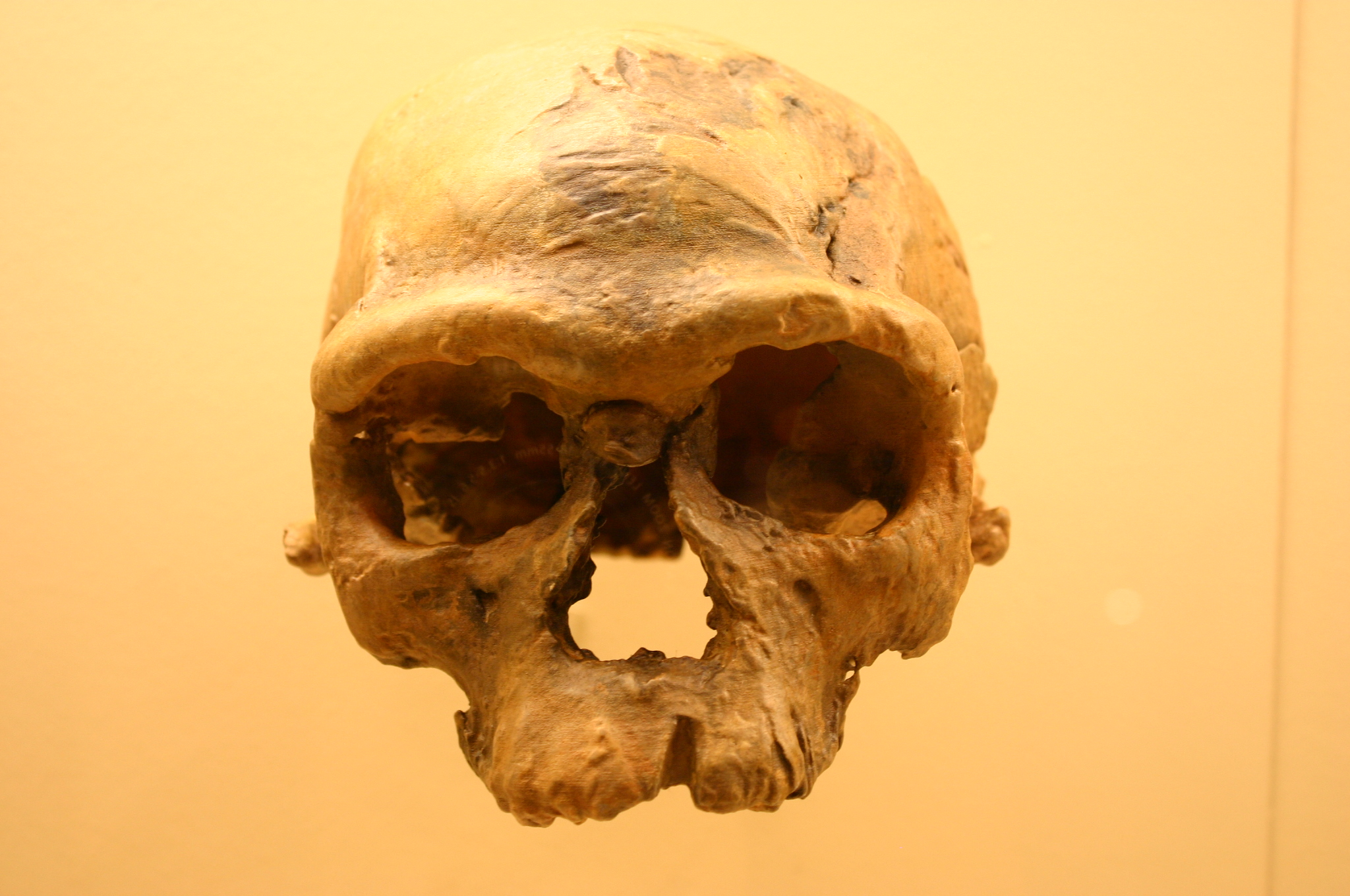
Jebel Irhoud skull

Early anatomically modern humans are known to have been present at Jebel Irhoud, in what is now Morocco, approximately 300,000 years ago.

Human groups of Nazlet Sabaha, Egypt engaged in chert mining, as early as ~100,000 years ago, likely for use as tools.

In the Sahara, Aterians camped near lakes, rivers, and springs, and engaged in the activity of hunting (e.g., antelope, buffalo, elephant, rhinoceros) and some gathering. As a result of a hyper-aridification event of Saharan Africa, which occurred around the time of Europe's Würm glaciation event, Aterian hunter-gatherers may have migrated into areas of tropical Africa and coastal Africa. More specifically, amid aridification in MIS 5 and regional change of climate in MIS 4, in the Sahara and the Sahel, Aterians may have migrated southward into West Africa (e.g., Baie du Levrier, Mauritania; Tiemassas, Senegal; Lower Senegal River Valley).

Affad 23 is an archaeological site located in the Affad region of southern Dongola Reach in northern Sudan, which hosts "the well-preserved remains of prehistoric camps (relics of the oldest open-air hut in the world) and diverse hunting and gathering loci some 50,000 years old".

=== Upper Paleolithic ===
The Iberomaurusian culture seems to have appeared around the time of the Last Glacial Maximum, sometime between c. 25,000 cal BP and 23,000 cal BP. It will have lasted until the early Holocene, c. 11,000 cal BP.

Archaeological evidence has attested that population settlements occurred in Nubia as early as the Late Pleistocene and from the 5th millennium BC onwards, whereas there is "no or scanty evidence" of human presence in the Egyptian Nile Valley during these periods, which may be due to problems in site preservation.

== Mesolithic ==
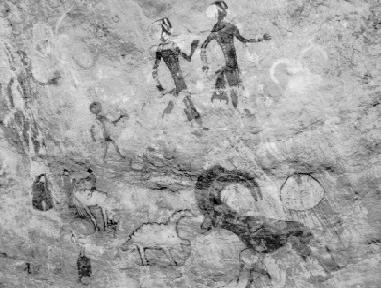
Round Head rock art found in Tassili n'Ajjer (Plateau of the Chasms) region of the Central Sahara

The Capsian culture was a Mesolithic and Neolithic culture of the Maghreb that persisted between 8000 BC and 2700 BC.

The engraved Central Saharan rock art of the Bubaline Period was created between 10,000 BP and 7500 BP.

The engraved Central Saharan rock art of the Kel Essuf Period was created prior to 9800 BP.

The painted Central Saharan rock art of the Round Head Period was created between 9800 BP and 7500 BP.

Laboratory examination of the Uan Muhuggiag child mummy and Tin Hanakaten child, concludes that the Central Saharan peoples from the Epipaleolithic, Mesolithic, and Pastoral periods possessed dark skin complexions.

== Neolithic ==
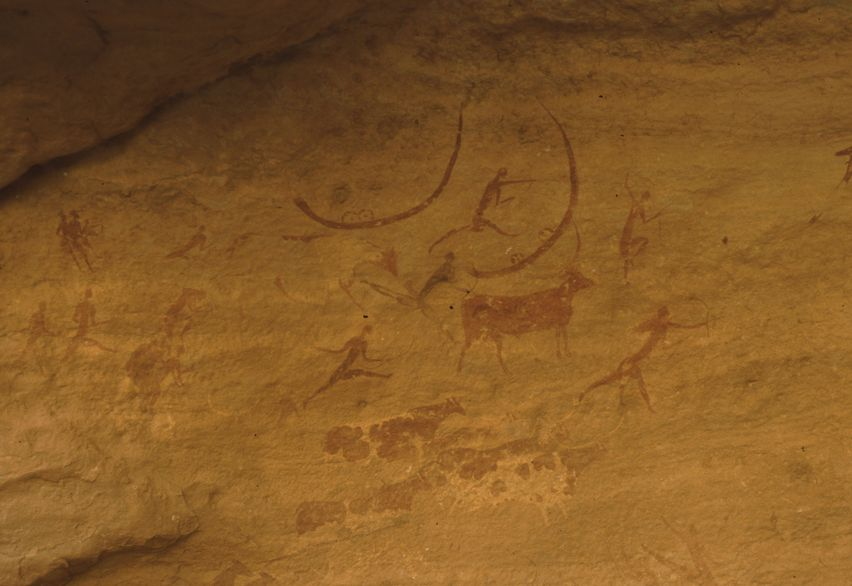
Warrior/Shepherd figures and animals of the Pastoral period

Neolithic agriculturalists, who may have resided in Northeast Africa and the Near East, may have been the source population for lactase persistence variants, including –13910*T, and may have been subsequently supplanted by later migrations of peoples. The Sub-Saharan West African Fulani, the North African Tuareg, and European agriculturalists, who are descendants of these Neolithic agriculturalists, share the lactase persistence variant –13910*T. While shared by Fulani and Tuareg herders, compared to the Tuareg variant, the Fulani variant of –13910*T has undergone a longer period of haplotype differentiation. The Fulani lactase persistence variant –13910*T may have spread, along with cattle pastoralism, between 9686 BP and 7534 BP, possibly around 8500 BP; corroborating this timeframe for the Fulani, by at least 7500 BP, there is evidence of herders engaging in the act of milking in the Central Sahara. The engraved and painted Central Saharan rock art of the Pastoral Period was created between 7500 BP and 2800 BP. One of the earliest Libyco-Berber inscriptions in Africa are found in Wadi Mertoutek, near or within a petroglyph, which may be the depiction of a bovid, and may be associated with a pastoral community during a period of pastoralism.

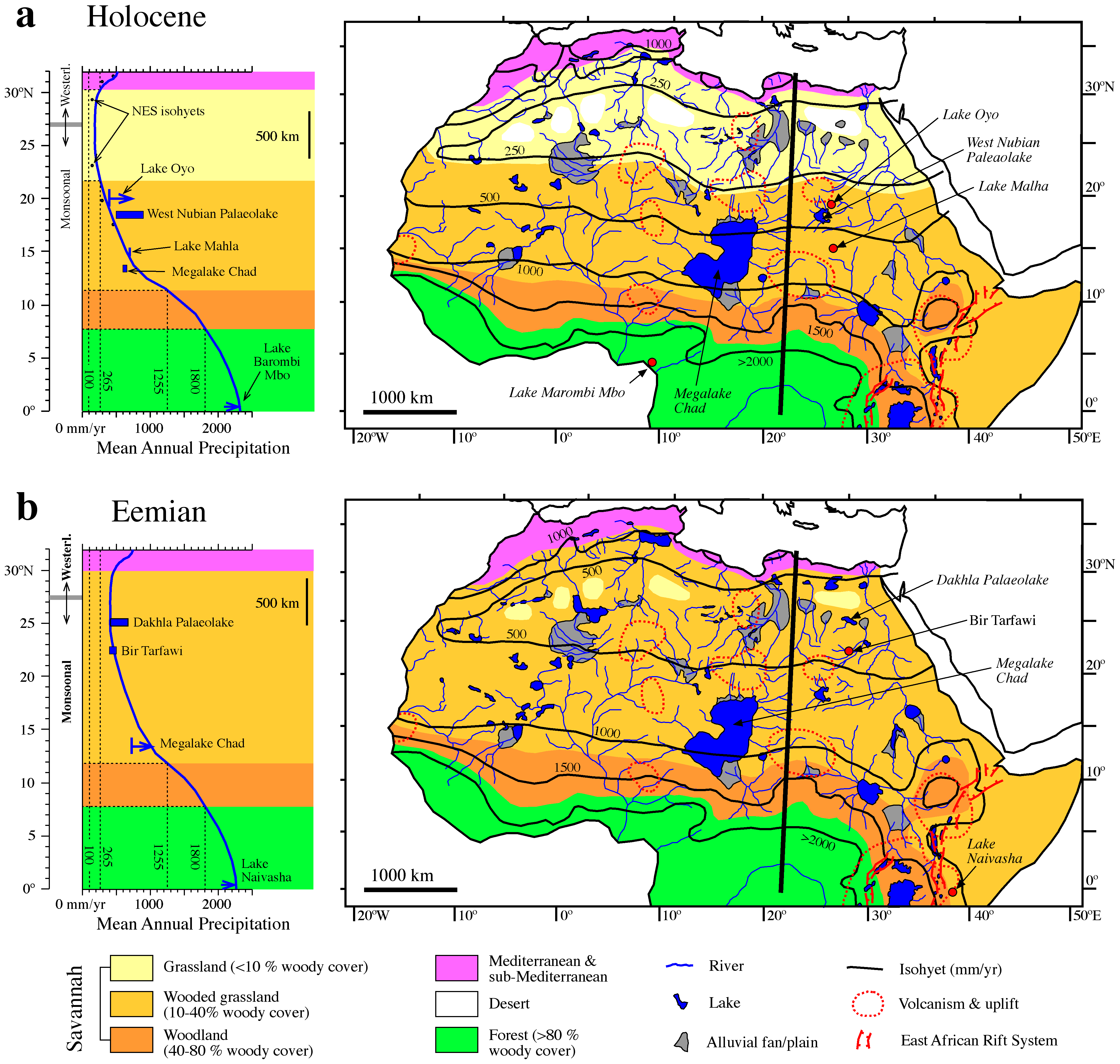
Vegetation and water bodies in early Holocene (top), between about 12,000 and 7,000 years ago, and Eemian (bottom)

Human remains were found by archaeologists in 2000 at a site known as Gobero in the Ténéré Desert of northeastern Niger. The Gobero finds represent a uniquely preserved record of human habitation and burials from what is now called the Kiffian (7700 BC – 6200 BC) and the Tenerian (5200 BC – 2500 BC) cultures.

The classic account of the riparian lifestyle of this period comes from investigations in Sudan during World War II by British archeologist Anthony Arkell. Arkell's report described a Late Stone Age settlement on a sandbank of the Blue Nile which was then about 12 feet (3.7 m) higher than its present flood stage. The countryside was clearly savanna, not the present-day desert, as evidenced by the bones of the most common species found in the middens — antelope, which require large expanses of seed-bearing grasses. These people probably lived mainly on fish, however, and Arkell concluded, based on the totality of the evidence, that rainfall at the time was at least three times that of today. The physical characteristics derived from skeletal remains suggested that these people were related to modern Nilotic peoples, such as the Nuer and Dinka. Subsequent radiocarbon dating firmly established Arkell's site to between 7000 BC and 5000 BC. Based on common patterns at his site and at French-excavated sites already reported from Chad, Mali and Niger (e.g., bone harpoons and a characteristic "wavy line" pottery), Arkell inferred "a common fishing and hunting culture spread by negroid people right across Africa at about the latitude of Khartoum at a time when the climate was so different that it was not desert." Hunter-fishers, who created the wavy line pottery in 6700 BC, were black African rather than Mediterranean in origin and showed signs of intentional cultivation of grain crops instead of simply gathering wild grains.

Several scholars have argued that the Northeast African origins of the Egyptian civilisation derived from pastoral communities which emerged in both the Egyptian and Sudanese regions of the Nile Valley in the 5th millennium BC.

According to American historian and linguist, Christopher Ehret, the physical anthropological findings from the "major burial sites of those founding locales of ancient Egypt in the fourth millennium BC, notably El-Badari as well as Naqada, show no demographic indebtedness to the Levant". Ehret specified that these studies revealed cranial and dental affinities with "closest parallels" to other longtime populations in the surrounding areas of Northeastern Africa "such as Nubia and the northern Horn of Africa". He further commented that the Naqada and Badarian populations did not migrate "from somewhere else but were descendants of the long-term inhabitants of these portions of Africa going back many millennia". Ehret also cited existing, archaeological, linguistic and genetic data which he argued supported the demographic history.

Dotted wavy line pottery and fishing cultures have also been located in the Lake Turkana region in poorly dated contexts. By 3000 BC, it does not appear that the Turkana Basin was populated with harpoon and dotted wavy line pottery users, but fishing remained an important part of peoples' diets into the late Holocene.

The engraved Central Saharan rock art of the Caballine Period was created between 2800 BP and 1000 BP.

The engraved and painted Central Saharan rock art of the Cameline Period was created from 2000 BP onward.

=== Maghreb ===
As of about 5000 BC, the populations of North Africa were descended primarily from the Iberomaurusian and Capsian cultures, with a more recent intrusion being associated with the Neolithic Revolution. The proto-Berber tribes evolved from these prehistoric communities during the late Bronze- and early Iron ages.

The late-Neolithic Kehf el Baroud inhabitants were modelled as being of about 50% local North African ancestry and 50% Early European Farmer (EEF) ancestry. It was suggested that EEF ancestry had entered North Africa through Cardial Ware colonists from Iberia sometime between 5000 and 3000 BC. They were found to be closely related to the Guanches of the Canary Islands.

== Bronze Age ==
=== Egypt ===
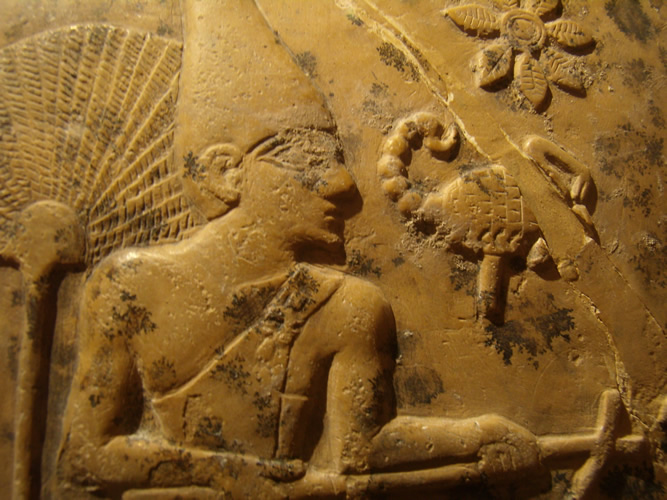
Pharaoh Scorpion II on the Scorpion Macehead

In Ancient Egypt, the Bronze Age begins in the Protodynastic period, c. 3150 BC. The archaic Early Bronze Age of Egypt, known as the Early Dynastic Period of Egypt, immediately follows the unification of Lower and Upper Egypt, c. 3100 BC. It is generally taken to include the First and Second Dynasties, lasting from the Protodynastic Period of Egypt until about 2686 BC, or the beginning of the Old Kingdom. With the First Dynasty, the capital moved from Abydos to Memphis with a unified Egypt ruled by an Egyptian god-king. Abydos remained the major holy land in the south. The hallmarks of ancient Egyptian civilization, such as art, architecture and many aspects of religion, took shape during the Early Dynastic Period. Memphis in the Early Bronze Age was the largest city of the time. The Old Kingdom of the regional Bronze Age is the name given to the period in the 3rd millennium BC when Egypt attained its first continuous peak of civilization in complexity and achievement – the first of three "Kingdom" periods, which mark the high points of civilization in the lower Nile Valley (the others being Middle Kingdom and the New Kingdom).

=== Maghreb ===
The Maghreb transferred from the Mesolithic stage to the Neolithic stage between the 6th millennium BCE and 5th millennium BC, then entered an intermediary period between Neolithic, Chalcolithic and the Bronze Age probably in the 2nd millennium BC, although they never truly transferred into either the Chalcolithic Age or the Bronze Age, remaining in between them and the Neolithic Age.

== Iron Age ==
=== Egypt ===
The Iron Age in Egypt corresponds to the Third Intermediate Period of Egypt. Iron metal is singularly scarce in collections of Egyptian antiquities. Bronze remained the primary material there until the conquest by Neo-Assyrian Empire in 671 BC. The explanation of this would seem to be that the relics are in most cases the paraphernalia of tombs, the funeral vessels and vases, and iron being considered an impure metal by the ancient Egyptians it was never used in their manufacture of these or for any religious purposes. It was attributed to Seth, the spirit of evil who according to Egyptian tradition governed the central deserts of Africa. In the Black Pyramid of Abusir, dating before 2000 BC, Gaston Maspero found some pieces of iron. In the funeral text of Pepi I, the metal is mentioned. A sword bearing the name of pharaoh Merneptah as well as a battle axe with an iron blade and gold-decorated bronze shaft were both found in the excavation of Ugarit. A dagger with an iron blade found in Tutankhamun's tomb, 13th century BC, was recently examined and found to be of meteoric origin.

=== Maghreb ===
Iron-working Phoenician colonization along the coast and trade with the inland caused the Maghreb to rapidly transfer from this intermediary stage to the Iron Age.

== Linguistic theories ==
=== Old North African languages ===
Old North African speakers, who have been misidentified as Paleoberbers and did not speak a language(s) that is linguistically related to existing Berber languages, were foragers of prehistoric North Africa that spoke a presently extinct set(s) of languages. Roger Blench coined the term, "Old North African," to describe and distinguish earlier languages spoken in North Africa from later languages spoken by incoming Berber speakers, Punic speakers, and Arabic speakers.

==== History ====
From coastal North Africa to Iberia (e.g., Spain), ethnic groups spoke a set(s) of languages known as Old North African, which were not necessarily genetically related to one another. Ethnic groups of Iberia that spoke the Tartessian language may be considered Old North African speakers. Ethnic groups and the archaeological cultures of North Africa that came before the Capsian culture, ethnic groups of the Capsian culture, and ethnic groups of the Neolithic Maghreb are considered to be Old North African speakers. As large animals migrated into and across the Green Sahara, Old North African speakers, who hunted them as game animals, also migrated into and across the Sahara. The variety of cultures in the Maghreb described by Herodotus in 2500 BP may have been the cultural variety existing among Old North African speakers at that time.

In 300 BCE, Guanche speakers, who may have been Old North African speakers rather than Berber speakers, may have peopled the Canary Islands. Though speculative, Guanche speakers may have spoken the Basque language, Tartessian language, and other similar languages of the Iberian Peninsula; supportive evidence for this view may be found in the few lexemes that have been related to the Basque language and an absence of Berber etymology found in some Guanche words.

Due to the migration of incoming Arabic (e.g., Hassānīya), Berber (e.g., Tuareg), and Punic speakers, Old North African languages may have eventually ceased being spoken in North Africa.

==== Ancient Egyptian language ====
Remnants of extinct Old North African languages may have been preserved in the ancient Egyptian language. For example, language contacts between Darfurian and Chadian proto-languages with the ancient Egyptian language. Additionally, the Tehenu and Temehu, which may have been ethnic groups with cultures and languages distinct from one another, may have also had their languages preserved in the ancient Egyptian language.

==== Libyco-Berber script ====
The Libyco-Berber script may be the result of a creolization process between the Berber and Old North African languages; this creolized language may reflect the linguistic connections between modern Berber speakers and Guanche speakers of the Canary Islands. Among many unknown elements found in rock engravings on the Canary Islands, some evidence (e.g., few basic lexicon, numbers) of the Punic language and Libyco-Berber script have been found. While the general view of the Berber languages being linguistically connected to the Guanche language is based largely on numerical evidence, it is also as probable that the affinity found between the languages are due to late-added Berber loanwords and that Guanche speakers were Old North African speakers. The Numidian language, which may have also been an Old North African language, constitutes the rock engravings in the Canary Islands.

==== Berber languages ====
The internal diversity of the Berber languages are not able to be reconciled with how early the Neolithic (7000 BP, afterwards) and Capsian (12,000 BP - 8000 BP) periods occurred in North Africa; thus, these Neolithic and Capsian periods in North Africa are not able to be characterized as "Berber." The foundational vocabulary of the Berber languages, if not due to how long the Berber languages have been diverged from other Afroasiatic languages, may reflect inheritance from Old North African languages.

==== Descendant languages ====
While possibly being Nilo-Saharan languages, the Nemadi and Dawada languages may also be descendant languages of the Old North African languages. Genetics may further inform the academic discussion about the connections between Old North African speakers and Nilo-Saharan speakers to the south of the Maghreb.

== See also ==
- Prehistoric Egypt
- Ancient Libya
- Garamantes
