= African archaeology =

Archaeology conducted in Africa

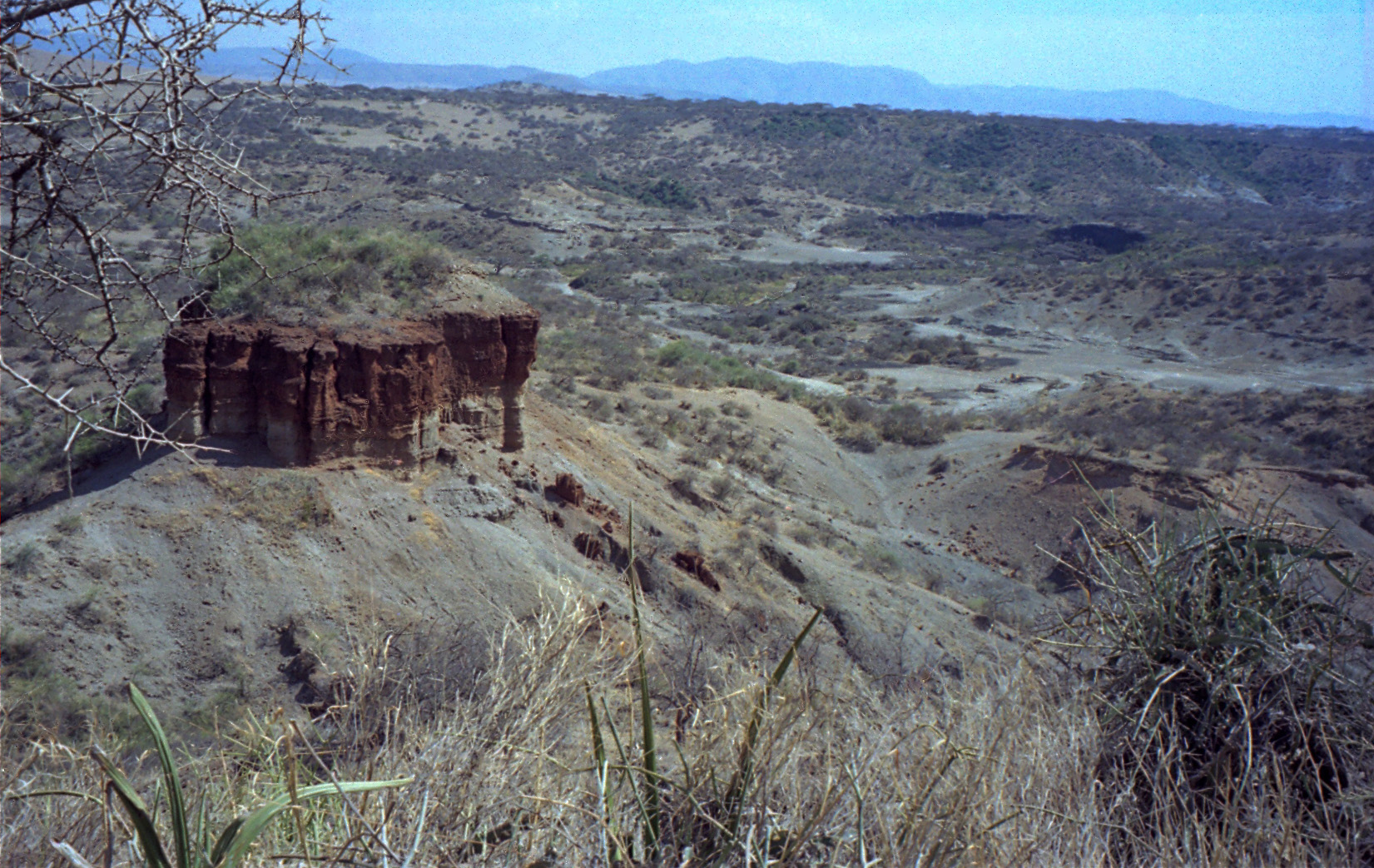
Olduvai Gorge, where some of the earliest hominins are believed to have evolved

Africa has the longest record of human habitation in the world. The first hominins emerged 6–7 million years ago, and among the earliest anatomically modern human skulls found so far were discovered at Omo Kibish,Jebel Irhoud, and Florisbad.

European archaeology, as well as that of North Africa, is generally divided into the Stone Age (comprising the Lower Paleolithic, the Middle Paleolithic, the Upper Paleolithic, the Mesolithic, and the Neolithic), the Bronze Age, and the Iron Age. For Africa south of the Sahara, African archaeology is classified in a slightly different way, with the Paleolithic generally divided into the Early Stone Age, the Middle Stone Age, and the Later Stone Age. After these three stages come the Pastoral Neolithic, the Iron Age and then later historical periods.

Africa's prehistory has been largely ignored, with the exception of research into early human evolution. However, it is overseen by the PanAfrican Archaeological Association, whose members consist of professional archaeologists from all over Africa.

== Early Stone Age Africa ==
Hominin timeline
← / Earlier apes; ← / Gorilla split; ← / Chimpanzee split; ← / Earliest bipedal; ← / Earliest sign of Ardipithecus; ← / Earliest sign of Australopithecus; ← / Earliest stone tools; ← / Earliest sign of Homo; ← / Dispersal beyond Africa; ← / Earliest fire / cooking; ← / Earliest rock art; ← / Earliest clothes; ← / Modern humans
(million years ago)

The Early Stone Age (ESA), which spanned from approximately 2.6 million years ago (mya) – 280,000 years ago (ya), describes a period in African prehistory in which the first stone tools were developed, including both Oldowan and Acheulean. Early sites along the East African Rift include Lomekwi in the Turkana Basin, Kenya, and Olduvai Gorge farther south in modern-day Tanzania. The earliest hominids were discovered in Ethiopia and titled Ardipithecus ramidus. The diverging species of hominin are known as australopithecines and were first discovered in Olduvai. Australopithecines and their fossils include Paranthropus boisei, the most famous being nicknamed "Zinj" or "Nutcracker man" by Mary Leakey, the archaeologist who found it. Another older, famous australopithecine, related to those found at Olduvai Gorge but found approximately 2000 kilometers to the north east in the Awash Valley of Ethiopia, is Lucy, who was discovered by Donald Johanson and his team in 1974.

The earliest relative dating for stone tool use was discovered in 2015, by Sonia Harmand, at Lomekwi 3 in West Turkana, Kenya with stone tools dating to 3.3 million years ago. Lomekwi tools differ from Oldowan tools in their primitive technological features making them large and heavy. The Lomekwi are thought to have been made by Australopithecus afarensis. Prior to this discovery, some of the oldest stone tools were found at Lokalalei 2C in West Turkana, where artifacts exhibiting knapping processes conducted by Australopithecus africanus date to about 2.34 million years ago, marking the beginning of the ESA. Incorporation of tools provided early hominins the ability to respond to changes more readily outside of the immediate needs of daily-life and extended adaptability behavioral patterns into long-term trends experienced over generations.

Around a million years later, Homo erectus evolved into a more advanced species and made tools known as the Acheulean handaxes. These handaxes were a multipurpose bifacial technology that remained unchanged for thousands of years. The technology demonstrates an increase in brain development and complexity in Homo erectus, as shown by the increased level of forethought and knowledge of material required for production of the tools. Homo erectus are also associated with the first instances of "modern human living,, such as fire, "modern emotions", and art. The earliest evidence for hominins controlling fire is found in Wonderwerk Cave, South Africa. Along with their new technologies, they were also a part of the first "Out of Africa" movement and spread to all parts of the world. This movement took place somewhere around 1.8–0.8 million years ago, where Homo erectus spread out from Africa and into Eurasia. One of the most notable Homo erectus skeletons ever found was that of Nariokotome Boy, who was found near Lake Turkana in Kenya, discovered by Richard Leakey and Kamoya Kimeu. Nariokotome Boy was a teenager when he died, and his skeleton exhibits the first evidence for caring in the archaeological record, because he was cared for through his debilitating scoliosis.

Just recently discovered was a new addition to the line of human ancestors named Homo naledi. Found in Rising Star Cave in South Africa, Homo naledi is undated but has features of both primitive and modern humans.

== Middle Stone Age Africa ==
The Middle Stone Age (MSA), dating to roughly 280,000 to 40,000 years ago, is characterized by the continuation of hunter-gatherer lifestyles and, as more recently recognized, perhaps the origins of modern human behavior and cognition. Even though hominin species' brains were reorganized and modernized at a fast rate, the behavior of these hominins did not adapt quite as fast. This caused the hominin species to be quite primitive. African hunter-gatherers hunted larger mammals and relied on an assortment of edible plants, both in the grasslands that are now the Sahara desert, and the rain forests of Central Africa. Coastal peoples also subsisted on seafood and numerous middens indicate their diet.

Homo sapiens appear for the first time in the archaeological record around 300–270,000 years ago in Africa. They soon developed a more advanced method of flint tool manufacture involving striking flakes from a prepared core. This permitted more control over the size and shape of finished tool and led to the development of composite tools, projectile points and scrapers, which could be hafted onto spears, arrows or handles. In turn, this technology permitted more efficient hunting such as that demonstrated by the Aterian industry, which covers large portions of Northern Africa. In eastern Africa, stone tools were made from raw materials such as quartz and obsidian using the prepared core method, which varied by region. It was during the late Middle Pleistocene that many groups began to migrate away from eastern Africa, especially southward. Technological improvements such as Aterian methods and the development of new skills helped these people adapt to new landscapes.

Although still hunter-gatherers, there is evidence that these early humans also actively managed food resources as well as simply harvesting them. The Congo Basin was first occupied around this time; different conditions and diet there produced recognizably different behaviors and tool types. There are also the earliest signs of art appearing through the use of ochre as a body decoration and paint, and burial rituals may have been practiced as well.

Evidence of a variety behaviors indicative of Behavioral modernity date to the African Middle Stone age, associated with early Homo sapiens. Abstract imagery, widened subsistence strategies, and other "modern" behaviors have been discovered from that period in Africa, especially South, North, and East Africa. The Blombos Cave site in South Africa, for example, is famous for rectangular slabs of ochre engraved with geometric designs. Using multiple dating techniques, the site was confirmed to be around 77,000 and 100–75,000 years old. Ostrich egg shell containers engraved with geometric designs dating to 60,000 years ago were found at Diepkloof, South Africa. Beads and other personal ornamentation have been found from Morocco which might be as much as 130,000 years old; as well, the Cave of Hearths in South Africa has yielded a number of beads dating from significantly prior to 50,000 years ago. These types of ornamentations represent some of the earliest signs of symbolic behavior amongst human ancestors, including developments in cognition and social relations. The beads from Bizmoune Cave, in southwest Morocco, are thought to be over 142,000 years old. Shell beads dating to about 75,000 years ago have been found at Blombos Cave, South Africa.

Specialized projectile weapons as well have been found at various sites in Middle Stone Age Africa, including bone and stone arrowheads at South African sites such as Sibudu Cave (along with an early bone needle also found at Sibudu) dating approximately 60,000-70,000 years ago, and bone harpoons at the Central African site of Katanda dating to about 90,000 years ago. Evidence also exists for the systematic heat treating of silcrete stone to increase its flake-ability for the purpose of toolmaking, beginning approximately 164,000 years ago at the South African site of Pinnacle Point and becoming common there for the creation of microlithic tools at about 72,000 years ago. Early stone-tipped projectile weapons (a characteristic tool of Homo sapiens), the stone tips of javelins or throwing spears, were discovered in 2013 at the Ethiopian site of Gademotta, and date to around 279,000 years ago.

In 2008, an ochre processing workshop likely for the production of paints was uncovered dating to ca. 100,000 years ago at Blombos Cave, South Africa. Analysis shows that a liquefied pigment-rich mixture was produced and stored in the two abalone shells, and that ochre, bone, charcoal, grindstones and hammer-stones also formed a composite part of the toolkits. Evidence for the complexity of the task includes procuring and combining raw materials from various sources (implying they had a mental template of the process they would follow), possibly using pyrotechnology to facilitate fat extraction from bone, using a probable recipe to produce the compound, and the use of shell containers for mixing and storage for later use. Modern behaviors, such as the making of shell beads, bone tools and arrows, and the use of ochre pigment, are evident at a Kenyan site by 78,000-67,000 years ago.

Expanding subsistence strategies beyond big-game hunting and the consequential diversity in tool types has been noted as signs of behavioral modernity. A number of South African sites have shown an early reliance on aquatic resources from fish to shellfish. Pinnacle Point, in particular, shows exploitation of marine resources as early as 120,000 years ago, perhaps in response to more arid conditions inland. Establishing a reliance on predictable shellfish deposits, for example, could reduce mobility and facilitate complex social systems and symbolic behavior. Blombos Cave and Site 440 in Sudan both show evidence of fishing as well. Taphonomic change in fish skeletons from Blombos Cave have been interpreted as capture of live fish, clearly an intentional human behavior.

Evidence was found in 2018, dating to about 320,000 years ago, at the Kenyan site of Olorgesailie, of the early emergence of modern behaviors including: long-distance trade networks (involving goods such as obsidian), the use of pigments, and the possible making of projectile points. It is observed by the authors of three 2018 studies on the site, that the evidence of these behaviors is approximately contemporary to the earliest known Homo sapiens fossil remains from Africa (such as at Jebel Irhoud and Florisbad), and they suggest that complex and modern behaviors began in Africa around the time of the emergence of Homo sapiens.

In 2019, further evidence of early complex projectile weapons in Africa was found at Aduma, Ethiopia, dated 80,000–100,000 years ago, in the form of points considered likely to belong to darts delivered by spear throwers.

== Later Stone Age Africa ==
The Hofmeyr Skull is a specimen of a 36,000-year-old human skull that was found in 1952 near Hofmeyr, South Africa. Osteological analysis of the cranium by the Max Planck Institute for Evolutionary Anthropology indicates that the specimen is morphologically distinct from recent groups in subequatorial Africa, including the local Khoisan populations. The Hofmeyr fossil instead has a very close affinity with other Upper Paleolithic skulls from Europe. Some scientists have interpreted this relationship as being consistent with the Out-of-Africa theory, which hypothesizes that at least some Upper Paleolithic human groups in Africa, Europe and Asia should morphologically resemble each other.

Around 10,000 BCE, African hunter-gatherer societies developed microlith technologies. Composite microlithic tools were useful for harvesting wild grasses and also permitted the production of fine shell and bone fish hooks, which may have allowed for the exploitation of a broader range of food resources. Some of the earliest pottery in Africa has also been found in the Sahara and is associated with hunter/gatherer populations. By 9,400 BCE, in Ounjougou, central Mali, pottery is thought to have been independently invented by local hunter-gatherers as they became more sedentary and began to intensively gather local wild grains (such as millet).

Archaeological evidence has attested that population settlements occurred in Nubia as early as the Late Pleistocene era and from the 5th millennium BC onwards, whereas there is "no or scanty evidence" of human presence in the Egyptian Nile Valley during these periods, which may be due to problems in site preservation.

In 2013, Iberomaurusian skeletons from the prehistoric sites of Taforalt and Afalou in the Maghreb were analyzed for ancient DNA. All of the specimens belonged to maternal clades associated with either North Africa or the northern and southern Mediterranean littoral, indicating gene flow between these areas since the Epipaleolithic. The ancient Taforalt individuals carried the mtDNA haplogroups U6, H, JT and V, which points to population continuity in the region dating from the Iberomaurusian period.

There is an on-going debate in regards to using modern-day hunter-gatherer societies, like the San, as an analogy to societies of the Later Stone Age.

== "Pastoral Neolithic" and Neolithic Africa ==
Cultural developments during the early Neolithic led nomadic hunter-gatherer lifestyles to be slowly supplanted by pastoralism in northern Africa. Africa's earliest evidence for domesticated animals comes from the Sahara c. 7000-6000 BCE, and evidence for new cattle herding lifestyles are preserved at both archaeological sites such as Gobero and in Saharan rock art. As the Sahara increased in size due to aridification, early pastoralists migrated south and eastwards into the Niger and Nile valleys, bringing with them herding practices that would also spread throughout eastern and southern Africa. The Savanna Pastoral Neolithic and the Elmenteitan material culture traditions are found in eastern Africa. Recent aDNA research has provided evidence for the spread of Pastoral Neolithic herders from eastern Africa into southern Africa.

In the western Sahel, the rise of settled communities occurred largely as a result of the domestication of millet and of sorghum. Archaeology points to sizable urban populations in West Africa later, beginning by the 2nd millennium BCE. Symbiotic trade relations developed before the trans-Saharan trade, in response to the opportunities afforded by north–south diversity in ecosystems across deserts, grasslands, and forests. The agriculturists received salt from the desert nomads. The desert nomads acquired meat and other foods from pastoralists and farmers of the grasslands and from fishermen on the Niger River. The forest-dwellers provided furs and meat.

In West Africa, Dhar Tichitt and Oualata in present-day Mauritania figure prominently among the early urban centers, dated to ~2,000 BCE. About 500 stone settlements litter the region in the former savannah of the Sahara. Its inhabitants fished and grew millet. The ancestors of the Soninke, of the Mandé peoples, may have been responsible for constructing such settlements. Around 300 BCE the region became more desiccated and the settlements began to decline, most likely relocating to Koumbi Saleh. Architectural evidence and the comparison of pottery styles suggest that Dhar Tichitt was related to the subsequent Ghana Empire and Djenné-Djenno cultures (in present-day Mali).

== Metal-using Africa ==
Farming societies in Africa developed after the origins and spread of livestock pastoralism throughout the continent. The early use of metallurgy by farming communities may have been developed independently in Africa around 3000-2000 BCE. There is still debate surrounding the exact beginning of iron usage in many parts of Africa and the circumstances in which its production began. The Bantu expansion is commonly cited as a catalyst to the spread of Iron across the continent, however, the expansion was not that of one monolithic group, but various waves of migration. As these Bantu peoples moved, some with the knowledge of iron working, they adapted to new environments and established new foodways, leading to a spread of ideas and utilization of new technology. Pockets of iron usage appeared in subsequent millennia but metal did not supplant stone in the south of the continent until around 500 BCE, when both iron and copper spread southwards through the continent, reaching the Cape around 200 CE.

In 2014, ancient DNA analysis of a 2,330-year-old male forager's skeleton in southern Africa found that the specimen belonged to the L0d2c1c mtDNA haplogroup. This maternal clade is today most closely associated with the Ju, a subgroup of the indigenous San people, which points to population continuity in the region. In 2016, a Late Iron Age desiccated mummy from the Tuli region in northern Botswana was also found to belong to haplogroup L0.

In central Nigeria, West Africa, around 1,500 BCE, the Nok culture developed on the Jos Plateau. The Nok people produced lifelike representations in terracotta, including human heads and human figures, elephants, and other animals. By 500 BCE, and possibly a few centuries earlier, they were smelting iron. By 200 AD the Nok culture had vanished. Based on stylistic similarities with the Nok terracottas, the bronze figurines of the Yoruba kingdom of Ife and those of the Bini kingdom of Benin are now believed to be continuations of the traditions of the earlier Nok culture.

Another site in southern Africa that used different types of metal was Bosutswe. The people who lived there used materials such as copper, bronze, and iron. It was proven that this metalworking was the basis for the trade that was responsible for the site's success and kept the power in the ruling Lose class.

== Historical Africa ==
Historical archaeology is a field of study that uses historical sources to help understand and interpret archeological evidence. This could include oral histories, written histories, or practiced traditions. One significant difference between history and archaeology as fields is that historical research typically focuses on a specific moment or event whereas archaeology focuses on process. Early historical archaeology often tended to use archeology to confirm what colonial literature said. This was problematic since it meant that no one tested the validity of European and Arabic historic sources and since it did not allow for the discovery of African ways of life.

Historic archaeology tends to focus on the 1600s and onward, or the era of colonialism and European expansion. Trade with the Near East and Europe led to strong mercantile empires growing such as the Ethiopian kingdom of Axum and Harla Kingdom. Various states and polities also developed in West Africa including Ife, the Kingdom of Benin, Igbo Ukwu, Djenné-Djenno, Ghana Empire, Bono State and the Ashanti Empire. Bantu peoples in southern Africa built the impressive site of Great Zimbabwe between the 10th and 15th centuries CE. The north of the continent had close cultural and economic ties with the Classical and medieval Mediterranean. Cattle herding became important in the Horn of Africa and huge earthwork enclosures were built to corral the animals. The people of Christian Ethiopia produced impressive rock-cut monolithic churches such as that of St George at Lalibela during the 13th century and the first Portuguese forts appeared soon after this, penetrating as far south as Zambia.

Today, historical archaeology has been used and practiced differently in different regions of Africa. Historical archaeology today typically attempts to draw from a larger breadth of sources, created by different actors.

=== West Africa ===
Historic archeology is most commonly used in West Africa. A majority of research had been concentrated in Nigeria, Ghana, and Senegal. Though, there is increasing work in Mali, Benin, and Cameroon. West Africa has a high concentration of historic archeology because of the trans-Atlantic slave trade. Especially since the 1980s, archeologists have tried to better understand the slave trade and slavery through the different sites. One example site is Badagry.

There are two limitations to completing historical archeology in West Africa. The first is, from an archeological perspective, the climate in the region has limited what has been physically preserved. The second is, from a historical perspective, sources can often be misinterpreted because the term "slavery" meant different things to different African societies. For example, the Asanti had five varying layers of servitude—which does not correspond to European and current understandings of the word. Even with these limitations, historical archaeology is useful for studying West Africa because oral traditions and memory help archeologists interpret data they excavate.

Historic archeology has been used to study the polity of Hueda and their interactions with European traders in the 17th C, Danish Plantations, and the Bight of Benin. Examples of popular books about historic archeology include the Archaeology of Slavery: A Comparative Approach to Captivity and Coercion, edited by Lydia Wilson Marshall and African Historical Archaeologies, edited by Andrew M. Reid and Paul J. Lane.

=== Southern Africa ===
South African historic archeology has been used to understand missionaries in the region. The first documented investigation was in 1964 by Revil Mason in Matlwase. A European settlement north of the Vaal River was being studied. His justification for studying the reason was similar to early archaeological justifications; he wanted to confirm what he had read in historical documents written by missionaries.

Historical archeology in Southern Africa has been limited by historical accounts being written from a colonialist perspectives. Oral histories from coastal and hinterland societies have proven useful when gaps arise.

Recent historic archaeological work in South Africa has been done in 2018. The work was at the Wittenbergen Native Reserve, which was founded by Cape Colony political authorities and the Wesleyan Missionary Society. The work found the area was not permanently occupied and instead an area that different groups passed through.

=== East Africa ===
Recent historical archaeology work has been done by Jonathan Walz in Tanzania. His work is concerned with how historic objects moved along trade routes to the interior of Tanzania. He tracks Ivory and Slave caravan routes to Pangani from the Middle of the 19th C. He uses a combination of oral histories, written texts, and archaeological trade material. His work found that the Ivory and Slave Caravan routes let to Pangani. It also discovered that escaped slaves attempted to hide in the outer areas of Pangani. Another example of historic archeology in East Africa is studying village revolutions. Walz studied the 1890 Bushiri rebellion against Germans, which eventually resulted in Germans hanging the revolt leader.

One challenge when conducting historic archeology in East Africa is the loss of heritage sites in the area. Increasing tension between the owners and government groups has led to poor site management. In countries like Kenya and Tanzania this has resulted in destruction of heritage sites and different areas described during the colonial period. One reason is the increasing investment in resettlement of the areas and tourism.

=== Horn of Africa ===
Historic archaeology conducted in the Horn of Africa, or Northeast Africa, focuses on how trade, migration, violence, colonies, and missions changed in the area. As a general trend, long-distance trade declined around the 1600s. The decrease in trade meant some areas, such as the Axumite Empire, became more isolated. However, it also led to the increase in commercial integration for some areas, such as Sudan. Historic archaeology has helped fill in gaps when archaeological evidence is missing in the region. For example, the Oromo expansion has almost no archaeological evidence but is documented with significant historical evidence. Other studies have focused on tracking landscape changes, looking at when colonies were established, studying border disputes, and looking at the impact of both Christian and Islam missions on the area.

One challenge with applying the term "historic archaeology" to Northeast Africa is the assumption that the region was not literate (historic) before the 15th century. If one wanted to categorize the term using the colonial era or the beginning of European arrival, the typical time frame still does not apply. Archeologists have not found significant evidence of Western objects or written record until the 1870s. However, using the techniques of historic archaeology can still be useful to understand colonialism and European expansion in the area.

== Challenges and limitations ==
African archaeology faces a range of environmental, demographic, and institutional challenges that contribute to uneven research coverage across the continent. Like challenges faced by archaeological sites in other regions of the world, the preservation of African archaeological sites is endangered by threats such as urban development, political conflict, and climate change. In some regions of the continent, climates and ecologies have also limited the preservation of materials, making it difficult to recover long-term archaeological evidence.

Historically, imperialist countries have dominated the production of archaeological knowledge in the Global South. The legacy of colonialism in the discipline of archaeology and across the African continent has impacted the way in which African archaeology has been developed and conducted, often resulting in the exotification of African history, peoples, cultures, and artifacts.

Research efforts have also been shaped by patterns of funding. Much archaeological work in Africa has relied on financial support from Europe and the United States, and fluctuations or cuts in this funding have disrupted projects.

Currently, efforts are being made within African archaeology to decolonize the field. Research is being done in collaboration with local communities, and the African Archaeological Review has started tracking how many authors are of African descent.

== See also ==
- African Archaeological Review
- Prehistoric North Africa
- Archaeology of Banda District (Ghana)
- Egyptology
- Nubiology
