= Adrar Bous =

Massif in Niger

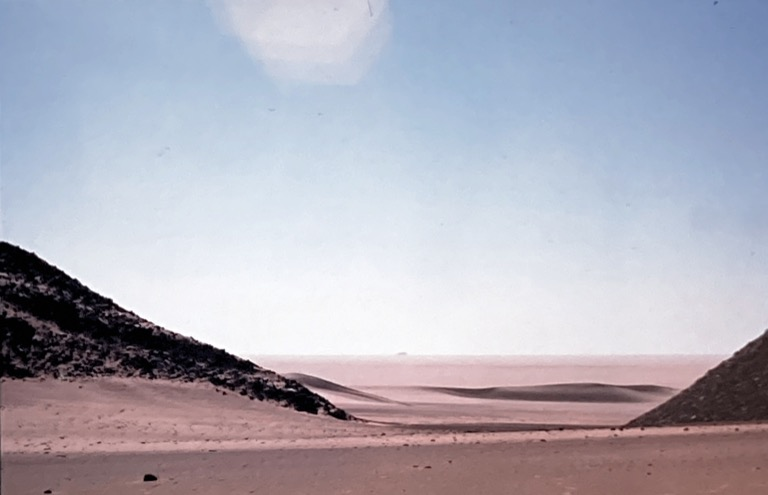
- Adrar Bous in the modern day.

Highest point
- Elevation: 1,123 m (3,684 ft)
- Coordinates: 20.370833°N 9.025°E

Geography
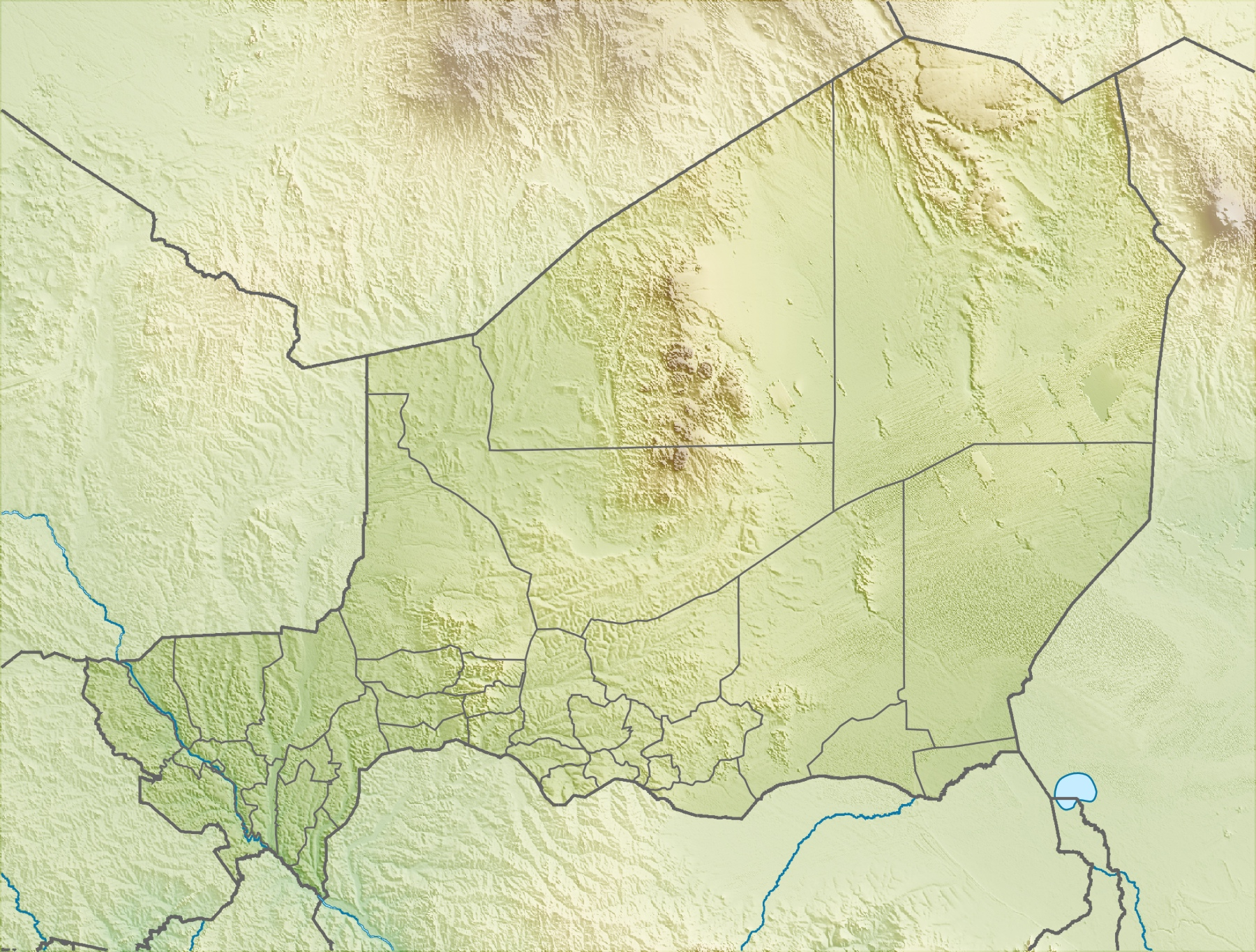
- Location within Niger
- Location: Ténéré Desert, Niger
- Parent range: Aïr Mountains

Adrar Bous is a massif in the Aïr Mountains on the western edge of the Ténéré Desert, Niger. Archaeological research at Adrar Bous, conducted by J. Desmond Clark, has produced finds spanning the Late Acheulean (1.76 – 0.13 Ma) through the Neolithic (11,950 – 6,450 BP). The massif contains a number of sites where microlithic tools are present, along with faunal and human remains. Most notable are extensive remains of ritualized feasting by specialized Tenerian cattle pastoralists. Its name is written in the Tamasheq language. The massif itself has been dated to be about 487 million years old.

== Geology ==
While the oldest formations in Adrar Bous date to the Precambrian period (~4600 – 541.0 ± 1.0 Ma), much of the ring-dike formation originated during the early Silurian period (443.8 ± 1.5 – 419.2 ± 3.2 Ma), likely due to the melting of the Saharan ice caps at that time. The massif is composed primarily of granite, and is host to a number of workable rocks: jasper, quartzite, chalcedony, and others.

== Microlithic sites at Adrar Bous ==
Surrounding the Adrar Bous Massif, several occurrences of diatomites yielded small stone tools and other artifacts, as well as the remains of aquatic and amphibious animals. Among the stone tools, scraper-type utensils were the most frequently found.

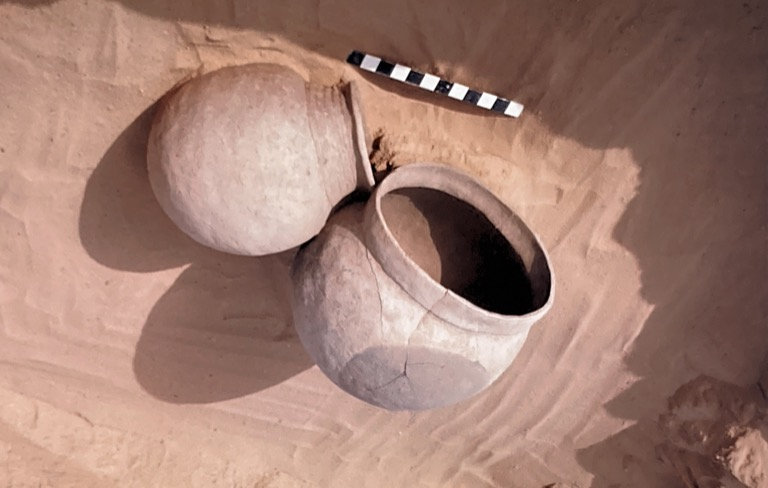
Two pots from Adrar Bous, in situ.

=== Adrar Bous III (Missions Berliet) ===
A site lying to the southeast of the main massif yielding a larger amount of truncated blades and crescent-shaped microlithic tools than other nearby sites. Whether or not it was inhabited at the same time as the other Tenerian formations is under debate, as its tools appear to be slightly older than those found at other sites nearby.

=== Adrar n'Kiffi (The Mountain of Fish) ===
A site lying south of the main massif, Adrar n'Kiffi, shows the remnants of a lake, with a number of tools made of bone and stone including a stone harpoon and some dotted wavy-line pottery, as well as amphibious and fish-like remains. It is the namesake of the Kiffian technocomplex.

=== Agorass n'Tast (Valley of the Cow) ===
A site lying to the west of the main massif, Agorass n'Tast, did not contain as many Kiffian remains as the other sites but boasts a spate of Tenerian artifacts and fauna, including many pieces of pottery, and the later noted Adrar Bous cow. There is a measurable point in this area where the frequency of artifacts lessens significantly, possibly delineating the outskirts of a settlement. There are also stone circles within this settlement, thought to be used for wind shelter.

=== Agorass n'Tchissikian (Valley of Tombs) ===
A site lying to the north of the main massif, Agorass n'Tchissikian, is south of the Well Area. This site contains a number of potsherds, as well as a number of tumuli. Two of the burials located there have been recovered. They were discovered to have been relocated to Cambridge, England, where all of their skulls were found to be missing and have not yet been located.

=== Diatomite 1/Gisement 10 ===
A small site southeast of the main massif, Diatomite 1/Gisement 10, is dated to about 9130-9030 BP. This site contained several terrestrial Kiffian fauna, as well as some aquatic specimens from the same time period.

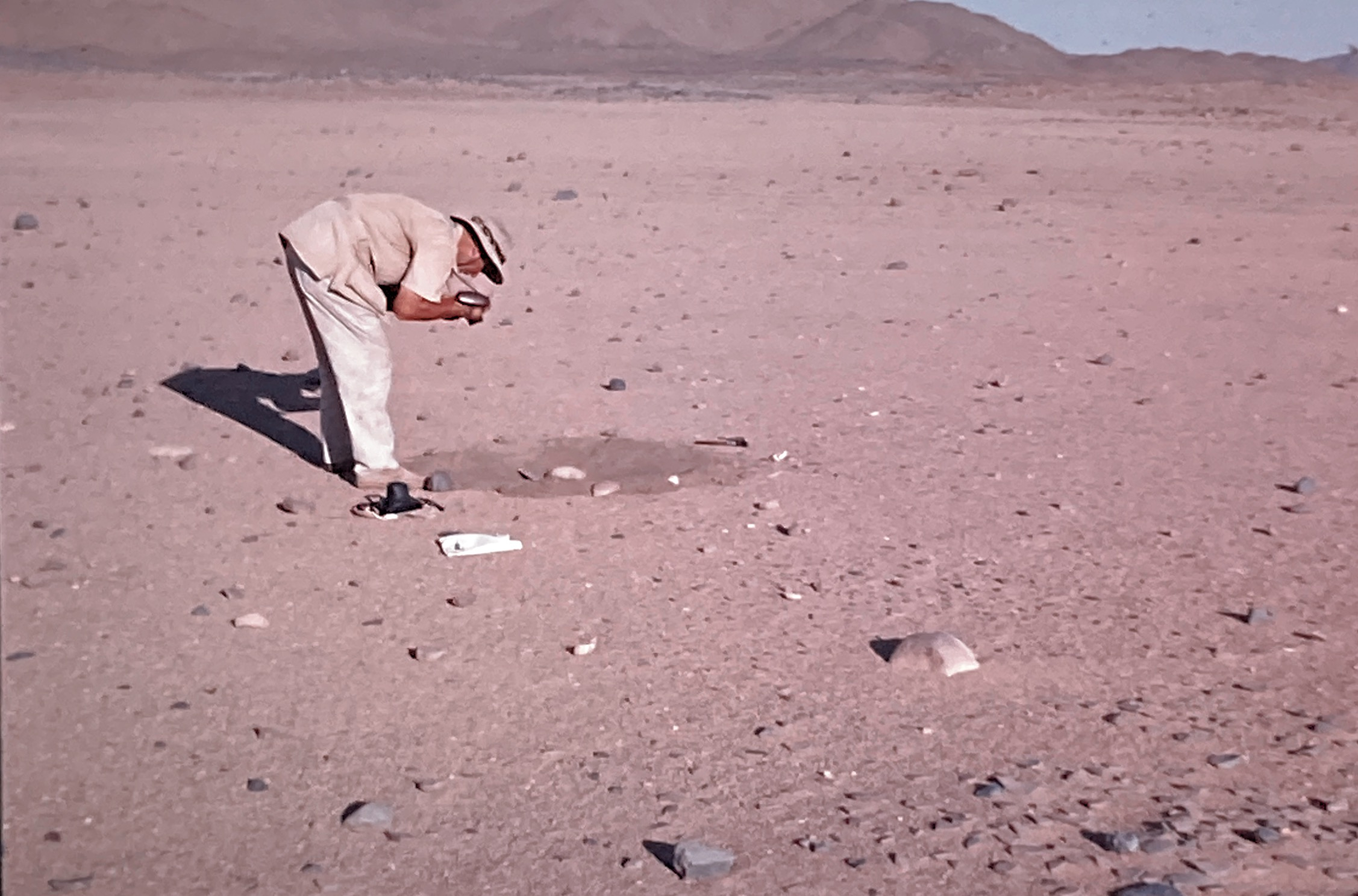
J. Desmond Clark at Adrar Bous.

=== Well Area ===
Lying to the north of the main massif, the Well Area site yielded similar tools to Diatomite 1/Gisement 10, without indication of a lake. It contains many similar artifacts to Diatomite 1 and Adrar n'Kiffi.

== Pastoral Neolithic herders at Adrar Bous ==
A number of Late Acheulean, Tenerian (~6950 – 4450 BP), and Kiffian (~9950 – 7950 BP) artifacts were discovered at Adrar Bous. Hand axes, found in highest number, were found among cleavers, adzes, and other objects. Adrar Bous also contains a number of faunal and human remains, dated to about 6,000 to 4,000 BP. The remains are diverse in terms of taxonomy and time period.

=== Faunal remains ===
A number of faunal remains were found at Adrar Bous, ranging from the Aterian to the Tenerian, and into the Neolithic. The Aterian specimens showed aging and mineralization most frequently, followed by the Kiffian and Tenerian specimens, respectively. Of the Aterian faunal remains, there are mostly indeterminate mammalian fossils and members of the Clariidae taxa, as well as four hippopotamus specimens and one indeterminate large mammal. The Kiffian remains (derived from Adrar n'Kiffi and Diatomite 1) include a larger variety of both Mammalian and fish-like fossils, including members of the genera Bovini (cows), Syondontis (tigerfish), and Sus (wild boar), among other native African fauna. The boar specimen extracted from Diatomite 1 had significantly longer teeth than its modern counterpart. The Tenerian faunal remains showed by far the most taxonomic diversity, with the bulk of researched specimens being mammals. Nearly half of the cataloged remains belonged to domestic cattle specifically of the Bos genus, some of whose bones were burnt likely by human cohabitants.

==== The Adrar Bous cow ====
A notable find in Adrar Bous is that of a young, fully articulated cow skeleton, discovered in 1976 on an exploration by Carter and Clark. The cow skeleton has been dated to 4145±45 BP, a time when there was a concentrated focus on pastoralism in the area. Its bone structure describes it as a small, short-horned West African cow. Its presence at Adrar Bous helps to delineate the adaptation of pastoral practices to African climates.

=== Human remains ===
There were four human burials recovered from Adrar Bous, two of which were discovered at Agorass n'Tast. Several burials were found with ornamentation, such as shells and beaded necklaces. One burial is represented only by a fragment of the skull. One of the individuals excavated from Adrar Bous shows spina bifida of indeterminate type, as well as osteoarthritis in the knees and back.

== See also ==
- Gobero
