= Esh Shaheinab =

Archaeological site in Central Sudan

Esh Shaheinab is an African archaeological site that was occupied multiple times during the early Holocene. Artifacts from this site exemplify various traditions including the Early Khartoum (8800 to 5000 BP), Khartoum Neolithic (c. 5700-3550 BP, approximately 3750-1600 BC), and Late Neolithic (4th millennium BP).

Location of Esh Shaheinab

The site lies approximately 50 km north of Omdurman on the west bank of the Nile in central Sudan. The climate Esh Shaheinab residents experienced was humid and its "wooded savannah" ecosystem ("patches of forest, grass and scrub") depended on large amounts of rain in the summer. Occupants relied heavily on the Nile for fishing while maintaining a hunter-gatherer economy. Remains of domesticated dwarf goats and some sheep indicate some participation in herding however, the remains are so limited that Esh Shaheinab is not categorized as a pastoralist society.

A. J. Arkell was the first archaeologist to excavate the site (1949) with the intention of filling in the gaps that remain between northern and western Neolithic histories in Africa. He excavated hearths riddled with evidence of complex culture and various subsistence practices. After the occupation that left the hearths, during the early Neolithic, it became a burial ground for occupants during the Late Neolithic. Numerous other archaeologists have visited the site since and published findings on pottery, food production, and tool production.

== Pottery ==
Hunting-fishing-gathering groups can be attributed with the beginnings of pottery making in Sudan. Early pottery was manufactured by "semi-sedentary hunter-gatherers". With the increase of more permanent establishments, ceramic technologies grew to meet the need to store locally procured foods such as cereals and fish. The Khartoum Neolithic (5700-3500 BP - 'Before Present', approximately 3700-3550 BC) (also called Shaheinab Neolithic) is a tradition that grew alongside these permanent sites and was established with the excavation of Esh Shaheinab by Arkell. Khartoum Neolithic can be classified based on the features of material culture and specifically the presence of dotted-wavy line pottery.

Dotted-wavy line pottery is a pottery type distinguished from wavy line pottery by Arkell, whose criteria for this distinction has since been criticized. Categorization of this type was made mostly on how to pottery was decorated, resulting in unclear lines between similar styles. For example, there is much crossover between wavy line pottery and dotted-wavy line pottery in terms of the techniques used to make them. In the 1980s, analysis and organization of pottery types began to be based on more objective terms (like decorative techniques, material use, and manufacturing process). This has allowed a more systematic study of pottery in archaeology.

Many archaeologists have suggested cultural continuity amongst the "Nilo-Sahara-Sahel Belt" due to similarities in pottery and other material culture across these regions. For example, dotted-wavy line pottery was once believed to be developed from wavy line pottery but that has also since been dismissed. Many attribute the continuity in pottery traditions as well as other innovations in material culture to be indicative of contact across regions. Concrete archaeological evidence has yet to be produced to allow for a definite conclusion and many argue against it based on the local derivation of materials for both pottery and lithic artifacts. However, plenty of archaeologists say a connection amongst Sudanese communities was possible due to the presence of material sources from far places. It is also believed the commonality of dotted-wavy line decorations across the Nile Valley and Sahara can be attributed to the diffusion of ideas instead of people.

Pottery in Esh Shaheinab is characteristic of three main traditions based on the pottery created during different occupations. These are Early Khartoum, Neolithic, and Late Neolithic. The majority of pot sherds from Esh Shaheinab are Neolithic, while fewer are Early Khartoum, and the fewest are Late Neolithic. Each phase is distinguished by material use, processing, and decoration type with similarities spanning across all three.

=== Early Khartoum ===
The pottery from Esh Shaheinab considered to be Early Khartoum is limited. It originates from a time period in which food production had not begun yet in Africa.

In terms of its composition, Early Khartoum pottery was medium-grained and more heterogeneous in make-up. Quartz, feldspar, and mica were found in pottery of this kind as these were common minerals in Esh Shaheinab geology.

The clay was processed with organic materials (flat fibers) and the vessels are unburnished.

Early Khartoum vessels are the thickest of the three traditions, with an average of 10 mm, but it uses the same coiling technique that all three display. This pottery was impressed using the rocker stamping technique producing zigzags and the dotted-wavy line pattern. This technique produced two notable variants under the dotted-wavy line category known as shallow dotted waves and angular dotted waves. These decorations spanned the entire surface of the pot (besides the bottom) which is more unique to Esh Shaheinab.

=== Khartoum Neolithic ===
The Neolithic pottery from Esh Shaheinab is the most notable collection from the site as it is the most discussed and most abundant. During this time, pastoralism had begun to become more frequent in Africa and could have had effects on hunter-fisher-gatherer communities in eastern Africa, like Esh Shaheinab.

Neolithic pottery in Esh Shaheinab was made from more homogeneous clays with high rates of quartz. It had mostly fine clay texture as well, distinguishing it from Early Khartoum examples.

Tempering occurred with organic materials, like that of Early Khartoum, except they tended to be tubular fibers (likely dung).

The Neolithic pottery from Esh Shaheinab tended to be thinner, around 5mm, and came in a greater variety of shapes. Despite this, they use the same coiling technique as Early Khartoum examples. The most distinct feature of Neolithic (and late Neolithic) is burnishing. Burnishing was done to all Neolithic pots with the most frequent being red burnishing on the outside, with the next most frequent being black burnishing. Some of the pots also displayed black tops. Another particular feature of Neolithic and later traditions is the reduced frequency of decoration. Where all Early Khartoum pottery was decorated over the whole surface, it is not uncommon to see undecorated pottery from the Neolithic. Some only contains decorations around the rim. The decorations that are exemplified in this tradition are highly varied, comprising packed vees and dots, paired lines, and dotted-wavy lines. Like the decorations, the techniques are also highly varied. Rocker stamping is implemented as well as a tool with unevenly serrated edges, and pivoting stamping.

=== Late Neolithic ===
The Late Neolithic pottery from this site is less abundant than that of the Neolithic. It is from a time that is more associated with pastoralism in which communities like Esh Shaheinab most likely had contact in some way with pastoralist communities.

Late Neolithic pottery resembles the Early Khartoum from this site in the sense that its clay is more heterogeneous but, it did have exclusively fine clay texture.

Tempering also occurred in this tradition with tubular fibers.

Late Neolithic pottery was similar to Neolithic in its thickness and technique in manufacturing. However, its decorative techniques do not exemplify the extensive variety seen in the previous culture. Burnishing was very common amongst Late Neolithic pottery shards with the most frequent being black burnishing then dark red-brown. Undecorated pottery is even more frequent than in the Neolithic collection. Decorations tend to be more standardized and was frequently done with the incision technique.

=== Pottery in context ===
Sites in Sudan, like Esh Shaheinab, are some of the earliest examples of pottery manufacturing in Africa. Arkell was the first to draw the connection between the cultural development of central Sudanese communities and ceramic technology, inspiring an influx of pottery studies in this region. Pottery studies in Sudan are now viewed as a central component to learning about the economies and societal structures that once occurred in these prehistoric sites. Archaeologists are still attempting to utilize new technologies to discover more about these hunter-fisher-gatherer turned pastoralists societies through the shards of pottery they left behind but, some inferences have already been made based upon the evidence present today.

In Esh Shaheinab, pottery likely began out of subsistence necessity. Hunter-fisher-gatherers were collecting local foods and using pottery to store, cook, and process them. Evidence about the changing environment during the early Holocene in Africa means these communities adapted to new natural resources by taking advantage of the now abundant flora and fauna. Based on the more consistent shapes and thickness of the Early Khartoum varieties, individuals were likely using these pots for storage of wild cereals and grains. This also suggest a greater reliance on plants as a form of subsistence.

Neolithic examples from Esh Shaheinab varied widely in shape and size, suggesting a variety of uses. This pottery was more refined in terms of technological skill and knowledge of manufacturing. The needs for these vessels varied greatly which required the ability to make variations of pottery that were adapted to meet these needs, resulting in thinner pots and burnishing treatments that were not present before. The use of these pots for cooking represents a radical change in the consumption of food for these peoples. They were now able to eat previously inedible foods due to the elimination of toxins through cooking therefore, expanding their diets. This not only allowed for a bigger population through a new surplus of subsistence resources but, Elena A.A. Garcea also suggests, it also allowed for a reduced weaning period in infants which in turn increases the survival rate of infants and the fertility of females further increasing populations.

The increase in the use of animal dung in the Neolithic tradition likely suggest the greater use of cattle as a means of subsistence. As these hunter-fisher-gatherer societies transitioned to pastoralist communities, cattle became more abundant however, they did not become pastoralists immediately. They continued to be sedentary with the slow implementation of cattle, eventually becoming nomadic herders. This is exemplified in the reduced use of animal dung in the burnishing of Late Neolithic traditions.

Overall, pottery at Esh Shaheinab, and many Sudanese sites like it, is deeply intertwined with cultural patterns, boundaries, and innovations. It can be used to infer social organization and important practices that help give us an idea of what life was like as a hunter-fisher-gatherer in the Early Holocene. In Esh Shaheinab in particular, we see the slow transition to pastoralism and the role changing environments played on subsistence practices.

== Tool technology ==
Esh Shaheinab was occupied right before the Neolithic period Africa, meaning it was a community on the cusp of pastoralism. Evidence of the beginning of the shift from a hunting-gathering community to a pastoralist community is present in the remains of domesticated breeds of dwarf goat and sheep. However, due to the consistent use of Esh Shaheinab as a permanent/semi-permanent settlement for hunting-gathering practices, it is clear this transition was a slow one.

The toolkit at Esh Shaheinab is varied and reflects the lifestyle of a settled hunter-gatherer with reliance on the riverine ecosystem for subsistence. The onset of a humid and wet environment facilitated a change in the toolkit of the traditional hunter-gatherer. Additions like bone-harpoons and fishhooks were frequent in sites like Esh Shaheinab indicating exploitation of the Nile for fish was common. During Arkell's excavation, tools like maceheads, axe heads (bone and stone), fish hooks, barbed bone harpoons, and gouges were found. Of them, the most frequent was gouges.

=== Gouges ===
Gouges are defined by Caton-Thompson and Gardner as “Artefact conical in outline. The dorsal face is either polished or polished and flaked. The ventral face is flaked only. The cross-section is a thin pointed oval. The working hollow edge is obtained by oblique flaking from the polished side”

In a detailed study by archaeologist Katarina Kapustka and Malgorzata Winiarska-Kabacinska, the gouges found at Esh Shaheinab were compared to gouges from the sites Sabaloka and Kadero so that many conclusions could be made surrounding the manufacturing and cultural significance of gouges during this time.

The gouges found at these sites were produced by professionals that were specialized in their fields. This means production of these tools was held to high standards and frequently completed by people who were experienced in manufacturing; evidence for this lies in the infrequent variability of the finalized gouges. Despite this, Esh Shaheinab has plenty of evidence for novice production of gouges, lending to the conclusion that gouges were produced at the site, instead of at the source of the natural resources.

The source for the material used for the making of these tools is predicted to be the area of Sabaloka which is located on the Sixth Cataract of the Nile. The preferred material from this location was red rhyolite, based on the higher proportion of gouges being made red rhyolite over the other variant (grey rhyolite). This fact poses an interesting question when it comes to the priorities in gouge quality. As Kapustka and Winiarska-Kabacinska state, it seems as though the occupants of Esh Shaheinab prioritized color over quality due to the "visible heterogeneities" in the red rhyolite, not found in the grey rhyolite.

Sabaloka is located farther from Esh Shaheinab relative to the other sites in this study. When it came to distance from the source of raw material and production quality, there seemed to be a negative correlation, meaning, the father the site was from the source, the more refined the manufacturing process seems to be. The location relative to the source of raw material is also correlated to the frequency of repair (which includes polishing). The farther the site is from the source, the more repairs and polishing is done to gouges. This could indicate a greater importance placed on raw materials based on distance from the site.

=== Other stone tools ===
Ground stone tools are also frequent the tool kit of the hunter-gatherer at Esh Shaheinab. These include axes, mace-heads, stone palettes, grinders, and rubbers. At Esh Shaheinab, sandstone was often employed to make these tools.

Ochre-grinders were used for mixing powered ochre with grease as well as potentially grinding seeds, dry meat or fish, crushing nuts, refining bone tools, and pounding clay for pottery. According to Garcea, the type of sandstone was selected to fit the intended function.

Arkell admittedly found axes to be of most interest amongst the tools recovered from Esh Shaheinab. Of these axes, some were made of bones and some of stone. The bone axes were made to be inserted into a wooden handle and sharpened (possibly on sandstone) to form a sharp edge. Arkell believed the bone axes were early versions, or prototypes, of the stone axes. These bones likely came from locally hunted large mammals and were used for the processing of meat. He theorizes that with the transition of the use of the axes from meat processing to woodworking, individuals realized bone was not strong enough for wood, so they therefore used the bone axes as a model to manufacture stone axes.

=== Bone and shell industries ===
Bone was frequently used as a material for the manufacturing of tools. These tools consist of things like harpoons, fish hooks, adzes, awls, chisels, and axes—as mentioned earlier. Ostrich eggshell beads and fishhooks made of shells were also frequent finds.

Fishhooks were especially important in Early Khartoum contexts due to the heavy reliance on the riverine ecosystem for subsistence. Thirty two complete shell fish hooks were uncovered by Arkell. These were bored with a hole then, broken to a circular shape and finally, rubbed into a point on one end.

=== Body ornaments ===
Body ornaments are a common find at sites like Esh Shaheinab. These could take the form of bracelets made from ivory or teeth, pendants made from various raw materials, and beads made from ostrich eggshell. Some pins made from bone are assumed to be lip, nostril, or lobe plugs.

The presence of these body ornaments indicated complex social and cultural organization due to their likely purpose of distinguishing different types of individuals. They also indicate a more complex economic system as some raw materials were non-local and required skilled craftsmen.
