= Tenerian culture =

African Neolithic culture

- Geographical range: Sahara Desert
- Period: Neolithic Subpluvial
- Dates: c. 5000 BCE – 2500 BCE
- Preceded by: Kiffian culture
- Followed by: Central Saharan Pastorals

The Tenerian culture is a prehistoric industry, or domain, that existed between the 5th millennium BCE and mid-3rd millennium BCE in the Sahara Desert. This spans the Neolithic Subpluvial and later desiccation, during the middle Holocene.

French archaeologist Maurice Reygasse first used the term Tenerian in 1934 with subsequent scholars producing a clearer definition. The Missions Berliet to the Aïr Mountains (Aïr Massif) in northern Niger produced the clearest definition prior to J. Desmond Clark's expedition to Adrar Bous in early 1970, the results of which were published in November 2008.

Human remains belonging to the Tenerian culture were first found at Adrar Bous in the Aïr Mountains. Other Tenerian specimens were also discovered at Gobero, located in Niger in the Ténéré desert. This region was lush at the time, and Tenerians were specialized cattle herders who also occasionally fished and hunted.

== Discoveries at Gobero ==
Gobero was discovered in 2000 during an archaeological expedition led by Paul Sereno, which sought dinosaur remains. Two distinct prehistoric cultures were discovered at the site: the early Holocene Kiffian culture, and the middle Holocene Tenerian culture. The Kiffians were a prehistoric people who preceded the Tenerians and vanished approximately 8000 years ago, when the desert became very dry. The desiccation lasted until around 4600 BCE, the period to when the earliest artifacts associated with the Tenerians have been dated. Some 200 skeletons have been discovered at Gobero, Niger.

The Tenerians were considerably shorter in height and less robust than the earlier peoples associated with Kiffian culture. Craniometric analysis also indicates that they were osteologically distinct. The Kiffian skulls are akin to those of the Late Pleistocene Iberomaurusians, early Holocene Capsians, and mid-Holocene Mechta groups, whereas the Tenerian crania are more like those of Mediterranean groups.

Graves show that the Tenerians observed spiritual traditions, as they were buried with artifacts such as jewelry made of hippo tusks and clay pots. The most interesting find is a triple burial of an adult female and two children, dated to 5300 years ago. The fossil has been estimated through their teeth as being five and eight years old, hugging each other. Pollen residue indicates they were buried on a bed of flowers. The three are assumed to have died within 24 hours of each other, but as their skeletons hold no apparent trauma (they did not die violently) and they have been buried so elaborately—which would be unlikely if they had died of a plague—the cause of their deaths is a mystery.

== Language ==
Tenerians may have been Nilo-Saharan speakers who descended from the Kiffians, or been proto-Afroasiatic speakers.

== Decline ==
Approximately 4500 years ago, the region became dry again. The Tenerian culture vanished, with its makers possibly seeking new pasturage elsewhere.

== See also ==
- Archaeology of Africa
- Aterian
- Historic desertification
- Ifri n'Amr or Moussa
- Kelif el Boroud
- Neolithic Revolution
- Tadrart Acacus
