= African Archaeological Review =

African studies journal

- Discipline: Africa, archaeology, prehistory
- Language: English
- Edited by: J. Cameron Monroe

Publication details
- History: 1983–present
- Publisher: Springer (United States)
- Impact factor: 1.620 (2020)

Standard abbreviations
- ISO 4: Afr. Archaeol. Rev.

Indexing
- ISSN: 0263-0338 (print); 1572-9842 (web)

Links
- Journal homepage

The African Archaeological Review is a peer-reviewed journal focusing on current African archaeology. Contents included in the journal range from the evolution of modern humans, advancements of human culture, and basic African contributions to the field of archaeology. The journal's first edition was released in 1983, and has been published continuously every year since then. Although new editions are typically released quarterly every year, there have been triannual and biannual releases of the journal. Its primary publisher is Springer Science and Business Media B.V. based in the United States.
