= Dotted wavy line and wavy line pottery =

Type of ancient pottery discovered in Africa

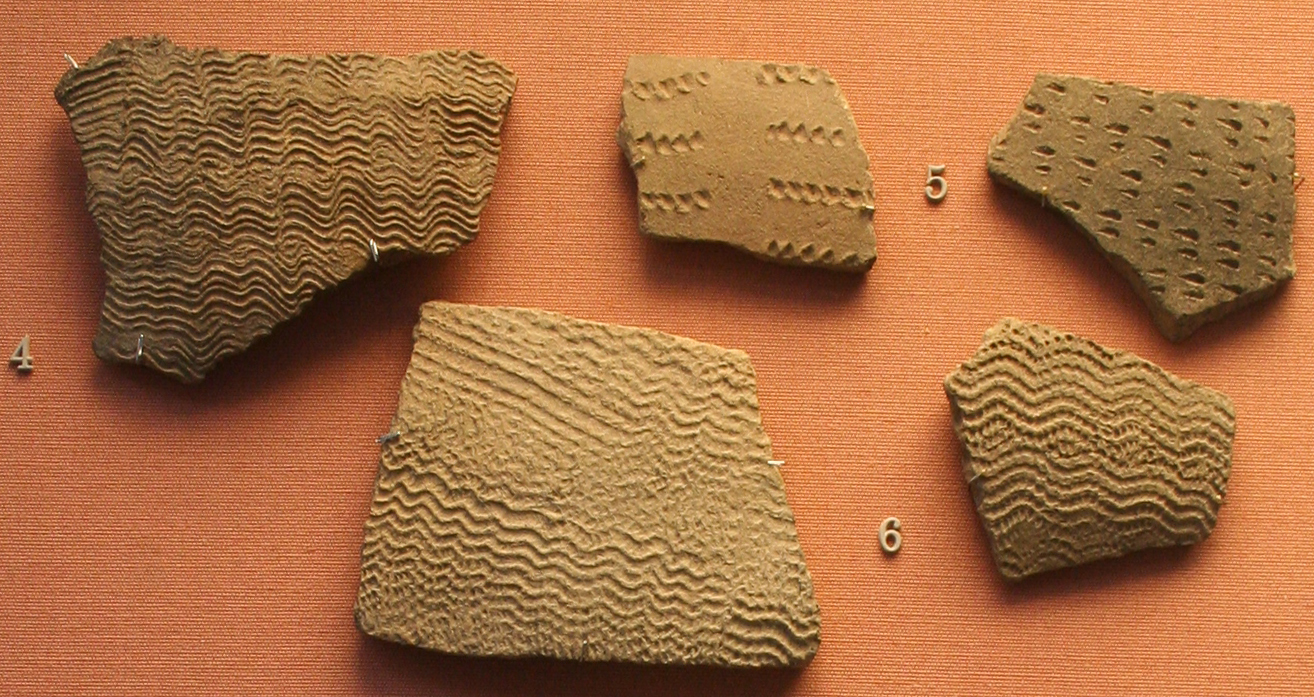

Dotted wavy line and wavy line pottery has been discovered in archaeological sites across North and Eastern Africa. These pieces are some of the oldest examples of pottery, made by hunter-fisher-gatherers between five and ten thousand years ago. The pieces of pottery are characterized by their namesake solid wavy lines and dotted wavy lines.

== Background ==
In the later Holocene, fishers and hunter-gatherers in Northern Africa created pottery that was characterized by decorative incised and dotted wavy lines. These pieces were created between ten thousand and five thousand years ago, making them some of the oldest known pieces of African pottery. These people lived during the African humid period in semi-permanent and permanent settlements around the numerous bodies of water that existed in the now-arid regions of North and East Africa. These settlements are characterized by the discovery of wavy line pottery found in conjunction with barbed bone points, which are adaptations for an "aqualithic" lifestyle, that is, a lifestyle dependent on bodies of water.

== Archaeology ==
Many pieces of wavy line and dotted wavy line pottery were discovered in the Khartoum Hospital and Shaheinab sites in the Nile Valley of Sudan. Khartoum was settled during the Mesolithic era. The Shaheinab site is just north of the Khartoum site on the west bank of the Nile River. Extensive excavations were done at these sites by archaeologist A. J. Arkell in the late 1940s and early 1950s. Although the majority of wavy line and dotted wavy line pottery examples come from these two sites, additional pieces have been discovered across the north and east of Africa. The oldest evidence comes from the sites of Tagalagal and Adrar Bous 10 in Niger where thermoluminescence dates hint to c. 10,000 BC, while the oldest more reliable C14 date—from Temet in Niger—proofs that pottery production was invented independently in Africa at latest around 8600 BC.

== Decorating motifs and implements ==
=== Decorating motifs ===
Arkell used the term "wavy line" to cover a broad range of decorating motifs, including incised wavy lines, which are more cohesive, and dotted wavy lines, which are wavy lines made of small dots. Incised wavy line pottery includes arch-shaped motifs and waves. Dotted wavy line pottery includes short and long waves, as well as arch-shaped motifs.

=== Implements ===
Many different tools were used to create the decorations. These tools included combs, pronged instruments, and spatulas made of animal products, such as bone or mollusk shell, plants and wood, or clay. Essentially any tool with a serrated edge could be used for decoration.

== Regional pottery ==
There are slight regional differences in the decorating motifs, implements used to make the decorations, and the tempers used in the pottery. The reason for these differences has not been studied extensively, but the availability of resources in different regions may be a factor.

=== Northeast Africa ===
Each decorating motif appears to pertain to a specific region. Pottery with smaller waves was more common in the central Sahara and Northern Chad, while pottery with longer waves was mostly in the Eastern Sahara and Nile Valley. Dotted wavy line pottery has been discovered in the northernmost part of the continent across the Sahara; however, the dotted wavy line pottery with small waves was concentrated in the central Sahara, and was rarely found in the Khartoum area. Additionally, incised wavy line pottery, a subcategory of the dotted wavy line pottery, was mostly discovered in an area between Chad and the Red Sea, with most of the sites containing this decorating motif concentrated between Khartoum and Atbara.

=== Lake Turkana ===
Similar pottery, also characterized by incised and dotted wavy lines, along with barbed bone points, was discovered in the Lake Turkana Basin of Kenya. This pottery is much like that of Northeast Africa, especially the Khartoum pottery, but there are some regional differences in the decorating motifs, implements, and tempers used in the pottery. It is hypothesized that this pottery was adopted from Northeast Africa, but there are no comparative analyses of the lifestyles and material cultures (including pottery) of the people of East and Northeast Africa.

== Early and late Mesolithic pottery ==
Arkell observed that the wavy line pottery was characteristic of the early Mesolithic, while the dotted wavy line pottery was characteristic of the late Mesolithic. These two series of pottery differ slightly in aspects besides decorating motifs; the potters from these different periods used distinct implements, or tools, to create the decoration, as well as separate materials to temper the clay. In general, the earlier pottery was tempered with quartz or sand, while later potters used organic tempers, such as chaff, shell, or bone.

== See also ==
- Ancient Egyptian pottery
- Esh Shaheinab
