= Mechta-Afalou =

Prehistoric North African population

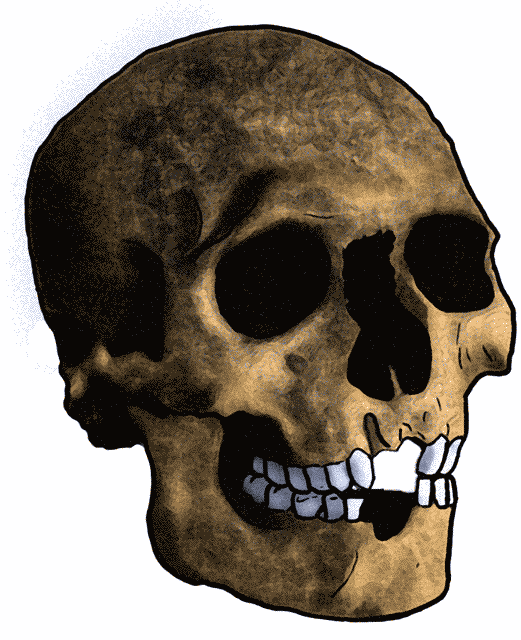
Mechta skull excavated at Constantine, Algeria

Mechta-Afalou, also known as Mechtoid or Paleo-Berber, are a population that inhabited parts of North Africa during the late Paleolithic and Mesolithic. They are associated with the Iberomaurusian archaeological culture. The name Mechta-Afalou comes from the large number of skeletons found in the Afalou bou Rhummel site in Béjaïa in Algeria.

== Bioanthropology ==
Mechtoids are believed to have been assimilated during the Neolithic and early Bronze Age by the makers of the ensuing Capsian culture. In 1999, the anthropologists Colin Groves & Alan Thorne in studying three Northern African samples from the Pleistocene/Holocene, found Taforalt was morphologically "Caucasoid" and resembled late Pleistocene Europeans, while Afalou was more intermediate in traits. In contrast to both, the Sudanese remains from Jebel Sahaba included in the study was described as "Negroid". The populations of Taforalt and Afalou were tall (176 - 179 cm), very facially robust, had large craniums, and showed strong sexual dimorphism. Moreover, in contrast to Upper Paleolithic relationships of Natufians in the Levant, the North African remains indicated a possible sub-Saharan African influence, likely from the earlier Aterian industries. The similarity between Iberomaurusians and Upper Paleolithic European crania could be interpreted as a retention of a morphology from early modern humans in the circum-Mediterranean, or contacts between the Maghreb and Southern Europe.

A craniometric analysis by Sereno et al. (2008) indicates that Iberomaurusians were closely related to the early Holocene Capsians of the North West Africa, as well as to the early Holocene Kiffians of the Sahara.

== Genetics ==
Iberomaurusian fossils excavated at the Afalou site were found to carry the Eurasian mtDNA haplogroups H or U (3/9; 33%), J (2/9; 22%), H103 (1/9; 11%), H14b1 or JT (1/9; 11%), R0a1a (1/9; 11%), and T2b (1/9; 11%).

Iberomaurusian fossils excavated at the Taforalt site were found to carry the African Y-DNA haplogroups E-M78* (4/6; 66%), E-L618* (1/6; 16%), and E-M35 (1/6; 16%). Majority of individuals carried the mtDNA haplogroups U6 (6/7; 85%), while one carried M1 (1/7; 14%).

Loosdrecht et al. (2018) analysed genome-wide data from seven ancient individuals from the Iberomaurusian Grotte des Pigeons site near Taforalt in north-eastern Morocco. The fossils were directly dated to between 15,100 and 13,900 calibrated years before present. The scientists found that all males belonged to haplogroup E1b1b, common among Afroasiatic males. The male specimens with sufficient nuclear DNA preservation belonged to the paternal haplogroup E1b1b1a1 (M78), with one skeleton bearing the E1b1b1a1b1 parent lineage to E-V13, one male specimen belonged to E1b1b (M215*). These Y-DNA clades, 24,000 years BP, had a common ancestor with the Berbers and the E1b1b1b (M123) subhaplogroup that has been observed in skeletal remains belonging to the Epipaleolithic Natufian and Pre-Pottery Neolithic cultures of the Levant. Maternally, the Taforalt remains bore the Eurasian markers U6a and M1b mtDNA haplogroups, which are common among modern Afroasiatic-speaking populations in Africa. A two-way admixture scenario using Natufian and modern sub-Saharan samples (including West African and East African samples) as reference populations inferred that the seven Taforalt individuals are modeled genetically as of 63.5% West Eurasian (Natufian-related) and 36.5% "sub-Saharan" African ancestry (with the latter having both West African-like and East African-like affinities), with no apparent gene flow from the Epigravettian culture of Paleolithic southern Europe. The scientists indicated that further ancient DNA testing at other Iberomaurusian archaeological sites would be necessary to determine whether the Taforalt samples were representative of the broader Iberomaurusian gene pool. The Sub-Saharan African DNA in Taforalt individuals was not found to have a good proxy in any present-day or ancient Holocene African groups. Jeong (2020) indicated that the Sub-Saharan African DNA of the Taforalt population has similarity with the remnant of a more basal Sub-Saharan African lineage (e.g., a basal West African lineage shared between Yoruba and Mende peoples).

Iosif Lazaridis et al. (2018), as summarized by Rosa Fregel (2021), contested the conclusion of Loosdrecht (2018) and argued instead that the Iberomaurusian population of Upper Paleolithic North Africa, represented by the Taforalt sample, can be better modeled as an admixture between a Dzudzuana-like [West-Eurasian] component and an "Ancient North African" component, "that may represent an even earlier split than the Basal Eurasians." Iosif Lazaridis et al. (2018) also argued that an Iberomaurusian/Taforalt-like population contributed to the genetic composition of Natufians "and not the other way around", and that this Iberomaurusian/Taforalt lineage also contributed around 13% ancestry to modern West Africans "rather than Taforalt having ancestry from an unknown Sub-Saharan African source". Fregel (2021) summarized: "More evidence will be needed to determine the specific origin of the North African Upper Paleolithic populations."

Martiniano et al. (2022) later reassigned all the Taforalt samples to haplogroup E-M78 and none to E-L618, the predecessor to EV13.

D'Atanasio et al. (2023) found that Iberomaurusian-like ancestry was characterizing for the unsampled "ancient Green Saharan" population about 12,000-5,000 years ago, and that modern-day Fula people derive around 30% of their ancestry from this ancient Saharan population, which was "modeled as a sister group of ancient Northern Africans, or alternatively, as an outgroup of all the "Eurasian-ancestry" enriched groups".

== Language ==
MacDonald (2003) states: "When one considers the African populations of the Terminal Pleistocene, the seemingly unified physical type of those dwelling in North African refugia (i.e. Mechtoids) and their eventual cultural assimilation of contemporary populations living in West African coast refugia, then language homelands for Niger-Congo and Nilo-Saharan between the Maghreb and the Nile Valley are strongly suggested. Further, in light of the Niger-Saharan macro-phylum hypothesis (Blench, Volume III and 1995c), a sort of unity for Niger-Saharan speakers would seem likely during the Late and Terminal Pleistocene (c. 20,000–12,000 BP)…In essence, a 'Niger-Saharan' model, from an archaeological perspective, would progress as follows. Proto-Niger-Saharan speakers may be represented by the post-Aterian, Mechtoid refuge populations of the North African littoral and highlands (c. 20,000 BP). Language diversification would have accelerated when populations began to expand into the Sahara from North African refugia at the beginning of the Holocene (12,000–10,000 BP)."

Blench (2019) states: "The linguistic affiliation of the North African forager populations who came south is difficult to establish as they probably represented a language phylum or phyla now vanished…These populations are called 'Paleoberber' in the literature, but there is no evidence they spoke a language in any way connected with modern Berber…Prior to the expansion of Berber and then Arabic, unknown but distinct languages would have been spoken in both the Sahara and along the North African coast…these languages can be referred to as 'Old North African' (ONA) with no presuppositions as to their genetic affiliation(s). It is possible they were related to the former languages of the Iberian Peninsula, such as Tartessian. Archaeologically, these must be identified with the Capsian and its predecessors, although the languages spoken in the first period of the Neolithic in the Maghrib would also have been ONA. But the completeness with which Berber eliminated ONA means little can be said about it. The Berber roots which are not of Afroasiatic origin may reflect these languages, or simply the long period of differentiation from the mainstream of the Afroasiatic lexicon."

== See also ==
- Tenerian culture
