= Bosutswe =

Archaeological site in Botswana

- Bosutswe
- 21.9525°S 26.6108°E
- Location: Botswana

Bosutswe is an archaeological site at the edge of the Kalahari Desert in Botswana on top of Bosutswe Hill. The site can be dated back to around 700 AD. The location of Bosutswe makes it easy for archaeologists to study as the record of the site is continuous. It is believed that the area was occupied consistently for around 1000 years. It was known for its advanced metalworking which first appeared around 1300 AD, which is known as the Lose Period. The Lose Period is named after the elite class that can be found in the area.

The early history of Bosutswe is marked with evidence of an animal-based economy. There is evidence of cattle, sheep, and goats. Once metalworking was introduced, it appears that wealth began to grow increasingly prominent among those who lived there. Throughout Bosutswe's history, the evolution of its culture can be seen through the type of buildings its residents have and the different ceramics. Evidence for trade with other sites can be demonstrated through the ceramics as well as the discovery of objections that can be traced to the Indian Ocean.

Metalworking was very important to the history of the site. Smithing can be traced back to Bosutswe during the Early Lose Period. There are no physical pieces of iron to be found from this same time period because the material is not well preserved in the soil of Bosutswe Hill.

== Continuous occupation ==
Bosutswe is unique because there is an almost uninterrupted record of the site for a millennium. There is currently no claim from any group in Botswana of kinship to those who used to live there. The name for the site, coming from the Tswana term, has spiritual meaning, dictating the importance of the site and why it might have been settled for so long. Some bones from a human hand have been thought to be used in a ritual sense. The site has been abandoned for almost three centuries. The Central Prescient is a small area found in Bosutswe with the densest amount of material that dates from almost the entire occupation of the site. The stratigraphy of the site demonstrates how the society evolved during its long occupation. It is likely the longest continuously occupied site in that part of Africa. Bosutswe's ability to adapt to changes occurring led to its long history of occupation. The idea that this place has some sort of spiritual meaning behind continues today as it is customary to leave gifts or offerings behind.

== Location ==
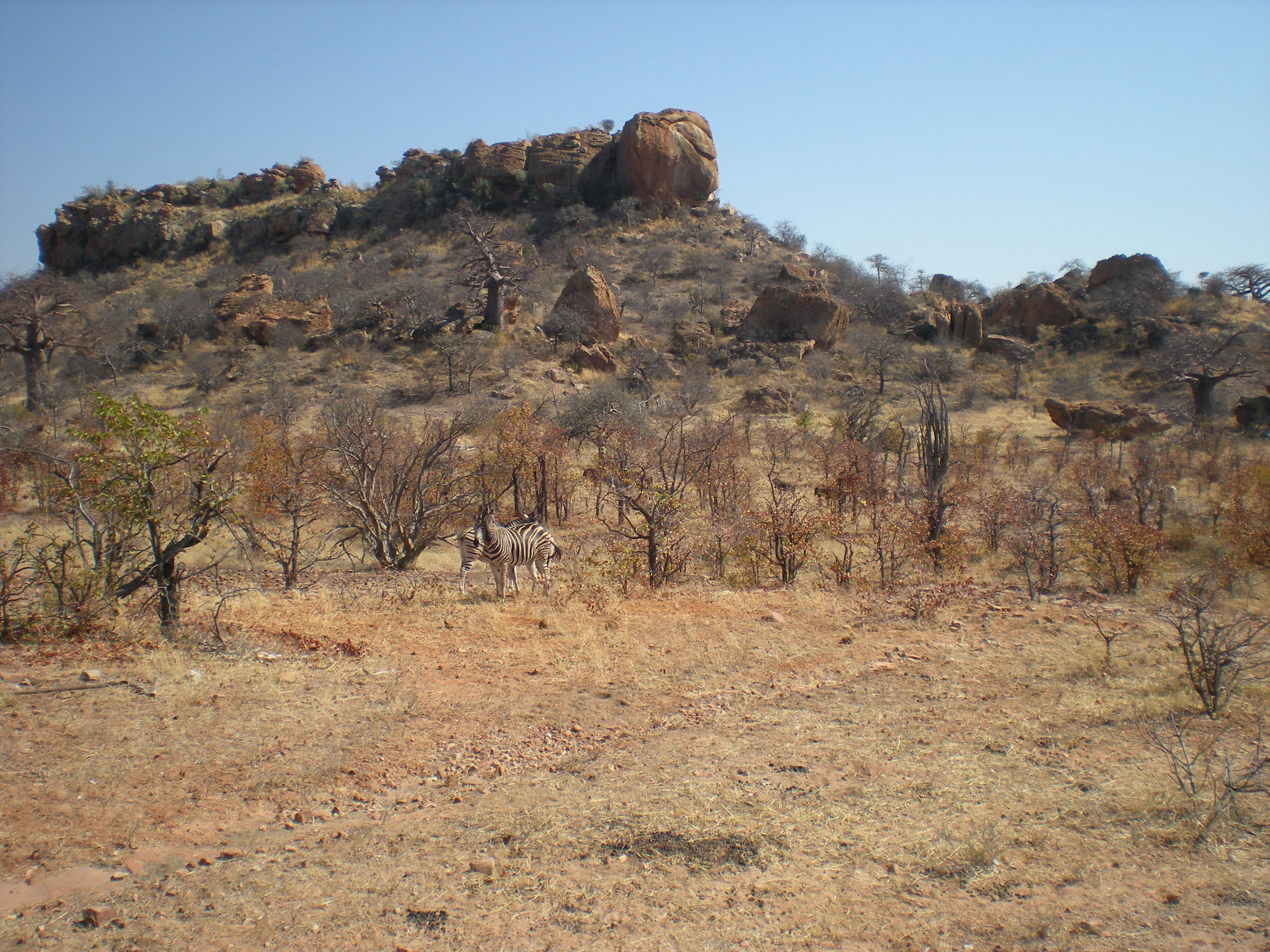

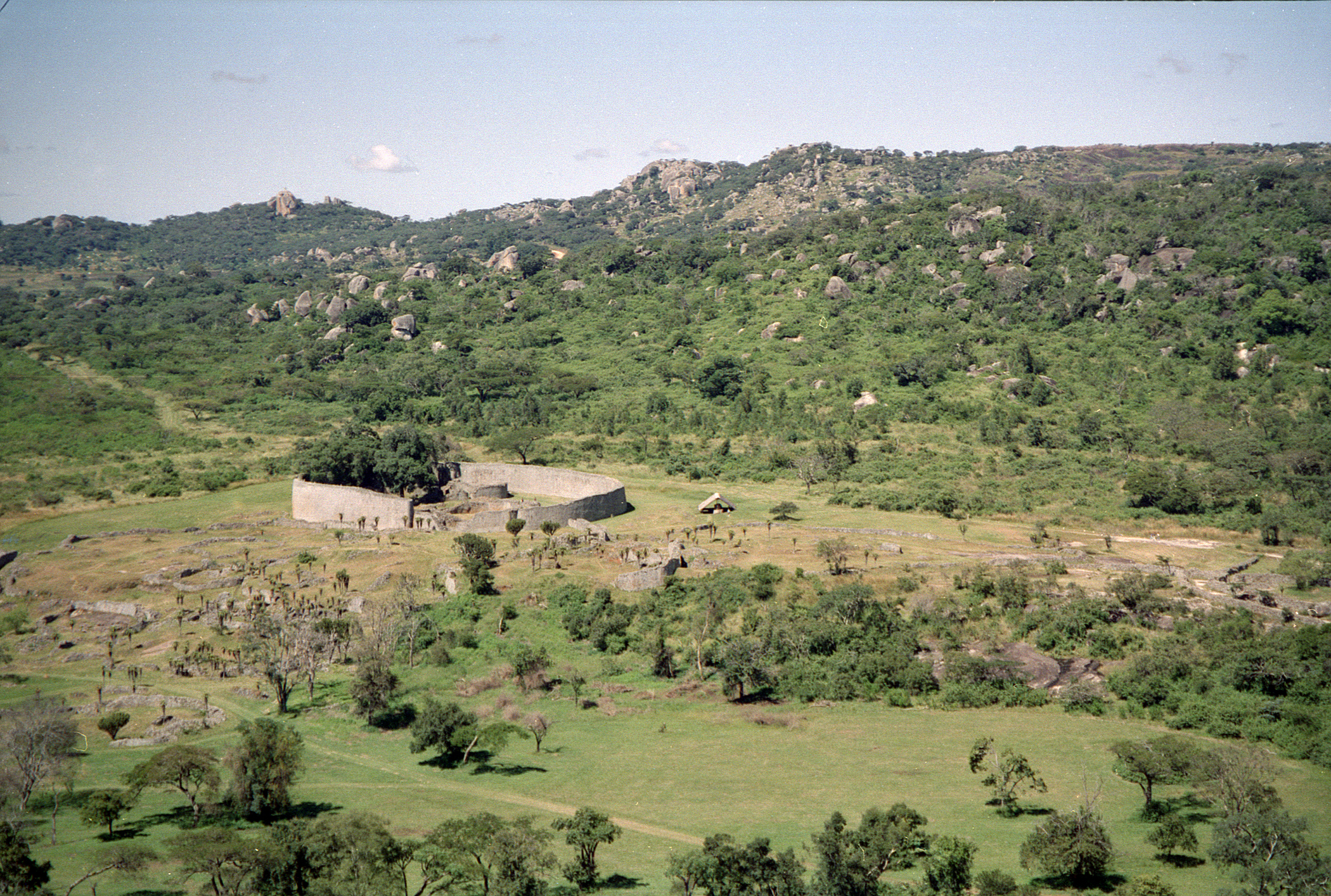
Both Mapungubwe (top) and Great Zimbabwe (bottom) were essential trading partners.

Bosutswe's location has it sitting between two different ecosystems, desert and farmland on a hill. The fact that Bosutswe is on a hill may have something to do with how important it was compared to the sites found nearby. Wells were dug to collect a sufficient amount of water for the settlement as well as dykes and a spring that has since disappeared. The location had key access to both grasslands and black cotton soils which would both be used for the benefit of the society. There was enough rainfall to support both agriculture and the raising of many different types of animals, especially during the Lose occupation. It also allowed for decent hunting of wild animals and there is also evidence of some nearby fishing. The dense foliage that currently sits at the site makes surveying difficult using satellites and has taken quite a bit of time.

Bosutswe is located quite close to its more well known influences and trade partners, Mapungubwe and Great Zimbabwe. Its location puts it right in the center of the continent and allows for access to both oceans and rivers are used for access to other sites. Smaller sites began appearing outside the main settlement site as semi-temporary lodgings for those who were part of the agriculture and livestock sector of the economy for only a few generations of people to live in. These smaller sites regulated the issues that affected that specific sector.

The area was first mapped in the early 1990s with excavations also taking place which continued into the early 2000s.

== Society ==
=== Phases of occupation ===
There are many phases to the occupation of Bosutswe, though there are some overlaps between the phases and there are no definite dates for how long each phase lasted. The initial occupation of the site was by the Taukome which only last around a century. The Taukome phase was mainly marked by the raising of animals. The Toutswe followed the Taukome and lasted until around the 13th century. Right after the transition away from the Toutswe, there was likely a large fire that destroyed much of the ceramics left behind by these people. Here, early trade begins with nearby sites.

Later society in Bosutswe was ruled by the elite class, the Lose. Initially, that meant having the most productive animals, then there was a shift in the region based on the products produced. Trade was key in determining who would be part of the elite class as it was based on the material goods that were traded. The Lose controlled the trade, so they remained in power. One did not actually have to own the desired goods but had to maintain the trade to be part of the higher class. Because it was tied closely with trade, that meant keeping up trade relations or else the elite risked their power. The more people a person knew that could improve something in the trade, the more likely they were to be part of the elite class.

Similarities between Bosutswe and the nearby site of Mapungubwe raise the question of whether the inhabitants were copying the other site or if a migration had occurred. The Lose is often split into the Mapungubwe and the Zimbabwe periods based on the influence from those respective sites. The Early Lose period ends with a fire that has no known cause but many possible theories to explain if it was set intentionally or only an accident. This also happened at around the same time the trade between Bosutswe and Mapungubwe's trade relationship fell apart. One theory has to do with instability caused by the fall of Mapungubwe leading to Bosutswe losing some of its control over the trade in the area. Another theory is that outside parties burned the site down.

=== Living conditions ===
Different types of housing have been found here. There is evidence of both permanent and temporary settlements. The Toutswe period seems to appear as a more temporary option with the Lose having more permanent lodging. Even within each period there are multiple types of housing options. The Lose period housing resembles those at Mapungubwe and are based more on social status than those of the Taukome or Toutswe periods. These elite houses could be picked out from the rest due to them containing house rats, meaning they were living somewhat grander lives than of others in their community though there is some debate based on this because house rats can be found in all phases. Rats also help keep the early dates of trade intact because they likely came from the African coast.

The elite lodgings during the Lose period could also be identified through the use of vibrant colors to adorn them. The luxury goods that were found in the trade that gave the elites their power were not required to have the power, but were common in their homes. No stone walls were built during the Iron Age here unlike some smaller nearby sites. Clothing was also used to help distinguish those in power.

=== Agriculture and livestock ===
The inhabitants made use of the land by engaging in agriculture, while also raising animals. Larger animals were hunted for game. The game would then be used in trade with other areas. It is likely that cattle was the main focus here after initially being about small stock in the Taukome or Toutswe periods. There was evidence of some form pastoralism that also involved some sort of permeance as some people would stay to maintain the site. There are fluctuations with the amount of cattle, most likely due to environmental factors or societal changes. There is an overall increasing trend. Stability in the amount of cattle appeared during the Lose period. There is some indication the dispersal of cattle changed, likely becoming smaller and more spread out due to issues with environment not being able to support the amount of cattle that they had. It is likely that the diets were heavily based on the meat harvested from the animals they raised or the game that was killed. Evidence supports the idea that animals other than cattle, like sheep and goats, were slaughtered on a need be basis, with not much concern for the regulation of the size of the herds. Cattle was more strictly managed because so much of the economy was also based on it. Fragments have been found supporting the use of bone tools made from the leftover bones of slaughtered animals in multiple phases of occupation. Those who took part in either agriculture or livestock aspect of society often had to face many issues that threatened not only their livelihoods, but the backbone of the entire settlement.

== Metalworking ==
Though there is some evidence supporting smithing in the Early Lose Period, most of the evidence can be traced to the Middle Lose Period. To master this skill has spiritual importance for the people of the region. It was also tied very close to the people. The furnaces used for metalworking physically resembled the people, specifically women, that were making the product, the child the woman would create. The furnaces would also be used in sacred ceremonies. It seems as though the metalworking at Bosutswe was tied heavily to the elite class.

Only one piece of gold has been recovered at the site. The nearby site of Mapungubwe is likely to be the source of this gold. This would prove that there was a link between Bosutswe and Mapungubwe which was a great trading center that was similar to Great Zimbabwe. Analysis of the gold fragment found at this site and other found in nearby sites show specifics of being produced locally compared to importing it.

There is evidence supporting the idea that the metalworking involved copper and bronze, while iron was done further away from the settlement. These items would then be used to trade and bring in other luxury items. Copper was hard to find so obtaining it was only something those in the elite class could do. The metals were often used to make metal beads that could be traded away during the Middle Lose Period. These metals were also used to make jewelry to adorn the inhabitants, specifically in a helix design. The presence of metal probably increased the power of Bosutswe compared to its neighbors.

== Trade ==
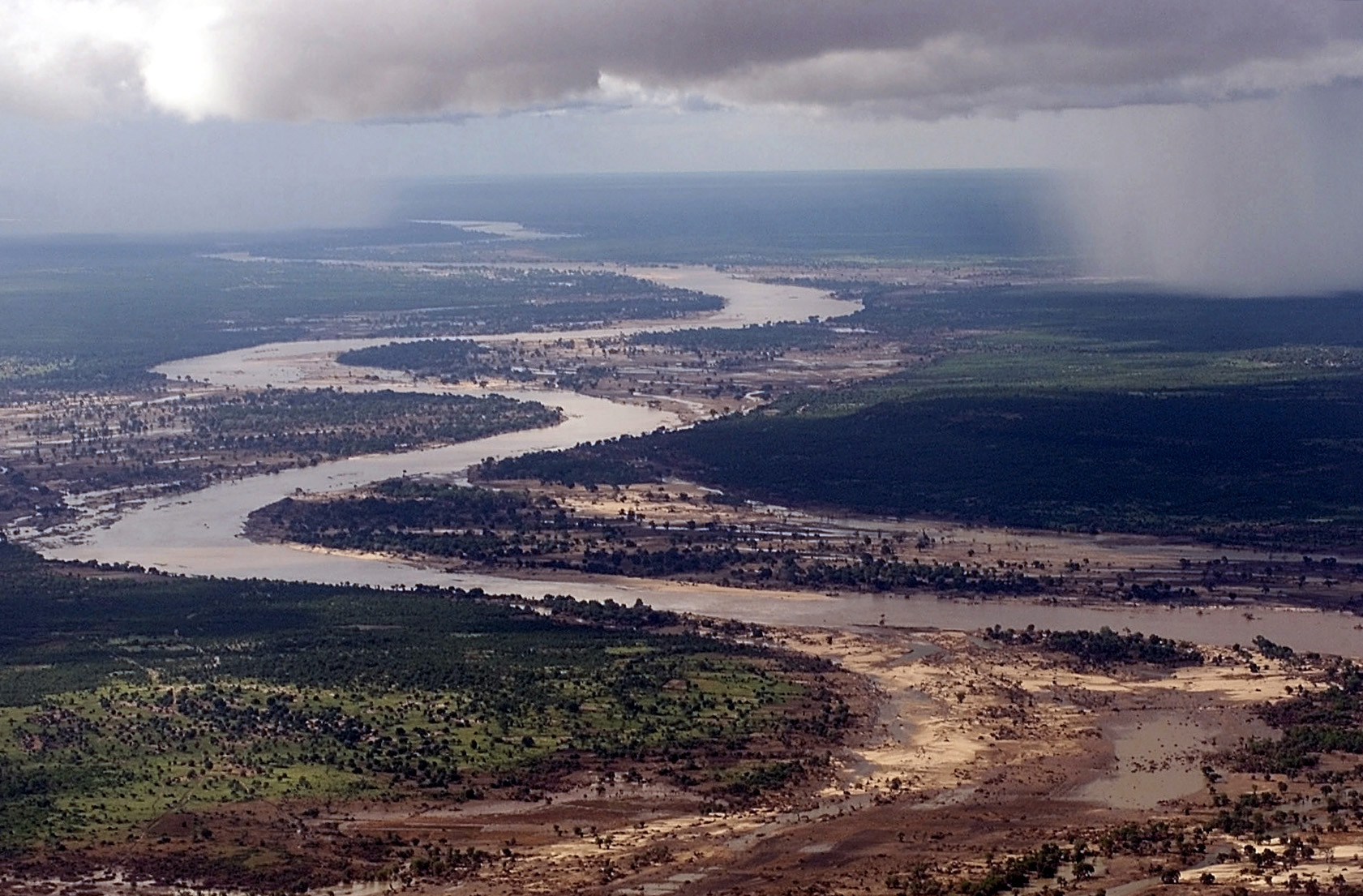
The Limpopo River was instrumental in establishing its power within the Indian Ocean trade system.

The rise of Bosutswe's power can be attributed to trade. It became the heart of their society and determined who held the power. It was seen as a primary stop before heading farther into Africa on either side. Access to the Limpopo River also meant access to the coast thus allowing for the inhabitants of Bosutswe to expand their trade network. Evidence to support Bosutswe's role in the Indian Ocean trade is glass beads. The glass beads were often found among the elite, which would visually confirm their status. The beads of various colors would be placed in one's home to mark the status. There is different materials used to make the beads showing evidence of evolution within the Indian Ocean trade system itself. It is possible that the people who lived here traded for the tin required as part of their metalworking. Tin is one of the two main materials used to make bronze so access to it was essential. Other products from animals such as skins were also used to trade. Ivory was another one of the commodities traded. Evidence is also found in the reverse. Distinctly African pieces are found in places like India.

There are strong trade bonds between the site of Khubu la Dintša as it contains many Lose items, though it could also mean it was a group of elites that chose to live farther away from the main settlement for livestock management reasons. If it was a separate settlement that was only a trade partner, it may have been a scramble to keep up trade relations as others fell through, such as losing access to the Indian Ocean trade system.

=== Ceramics ===
==== Toutswe ====
Different types of ceramics are found in Bosutswe from specific occupations and are made with different materials, but with one main material, basalt, and the difference being the other materials mixed with the basalt. Ceramics were one of the main items traded as evidenced by pots with distinct designs being found during the Toutswe occupation. Jars and shallow bowls are commonly found here. Some of this pottery was found to the northwest, proving that there was trade skirting around the edge of the Kalahari desert. Trade with this area also links Bosutswe of the east coast of Africa to the Atlantic Ocean. The Toutswe pottery is categorized with thicker rims that have geometric designs.

==== Lose ====
There is a shift in the type of pottery in the transition from Toutswe to Lose leadership. The same type of later pottery can be found at sites like Mapungubwe. This pottery helped identify who might be a part of the elite class in Bosutswe. This pottery appears more than the earlier Toutswe pottery. There is evidence, though, of some overlap in the pottery styles that created many categories within the ceramics excavated. Specifically Lose pottery has been found at local sites that might tell archaeologists what Bosutswe's role in the political environment. Some pieces of Lose pottery were found to be undecorated while others incorporated graphite into the pottery-making. Later pieces were more ornately decorated when compared to earlier pieces, including the most common detail of using dots to decorate the bowls. It could mean either Bosutswe dominated other societies or matched their power. Some pottery has been found with designs incorporating water. The facts that pottery made out of the same materials were discovered in other sites throughout Botswana signifies there also more localized trade it sites like Kaitshàa. It could also signify the mixing of people within Botswana.
