= Historic desertification =

Historic desertification is the study of the desert-forming process from a historic perspective. It was presumed in the past that the main causes of desertification lay in overuse of the land resulting in impoverishment of the soil, reduced vegetation cover, increased risk of drought and the resulting wind erosion. However recent projects to regreen deserts have not met with the success envisaged, and cast doubts on this theory. Research suggests that it is extreme events rather than drought caused by low annual precipitation, that do the most damage. Heavy downpours resulting in flash floods wash away sediment and there seems to have been an increased number of extreme events in the Levant at the end of the Byzantine period. The decline of settlements in the desert belt at this time may have been caused by these extreme events rather than a reduction in annual precipitation.

== Causes of desertification ==
The Mediterranean and its transition zones to the deserts are characterized by impressive Roman and Byzantine ruins, which are subject of discussion as to how these cities came to be deserted. It was assumed that population growth or conquest by nomadic tribes led to over-exploitation of the land, leading to soil erosion and irreversible degradation. Reduced soil and vegetation cover led to reduced precipitation and advancing deserts.

However, failure of development aid projects raised doubts about the validity of the historic desertification issue. For example, a project aiming to reduce sedimentation and erosion at the King-Talal-dam close to Jerash in Jordan could not achieve its goals, which became clear when a heavy rainstorm led to massive sedimentation into the dam despite the newly constructed soil conservation devices. As well, the expected positive effects of the reforestation could not be observed. On the contrary, a high fire risk emerged since pine trees are easily flammable, and the grazing pressure was moved towards more sensitive areas in the desert belt. The evergreen trees also reduced groundwater recharge.

== Research ==
A number of running research projects in Jordan found that the erosion of the main agricultural soil, the Terra Rossa, took place at the end of the last ice age and during the Younger Dryas. It seems therefore that erosion of today's intensively used soils was limited during historical periods, and not connected with desertification.

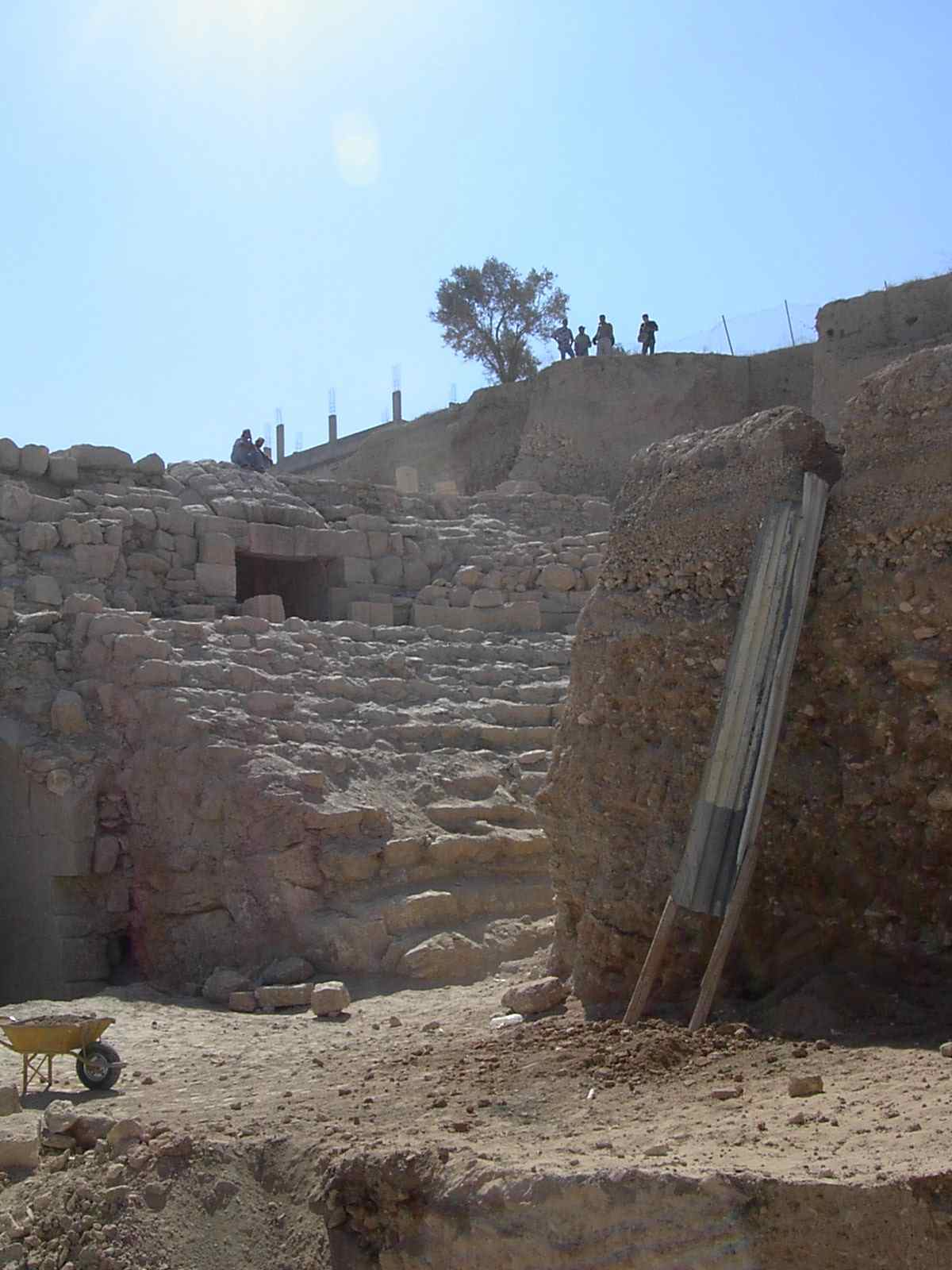
Sediments covering the theatre of Beit Ras (Capitolias)

The discussion about the impact of climate change on desertification focuses on drought. While some authors argue that periods of decline in the Levant were synchronous with reduced rainfall, others point to the non-linear development of settlement. However, a focus on annual precipitation allows only for limited conclusions about the productivity of agriculture. In this context, soils and colluvia point to an increased frequency of extreme rainfall events in the Levant at the end of the Byzantine period. As far as such events could be observed today, their associated damage was always enormous and could have had much more serious consequences than drought. The decline of settlement in the desert belt at the end of antiquity could be connected with an increase in extreme events.
