= Kiffian culture =

African Neolithic culture

- Period: Subneolithic
- Dates: c. 7700 BC – 6200 BC
- Preceded by: Capsian culture
- Followed by: Tenerian culture

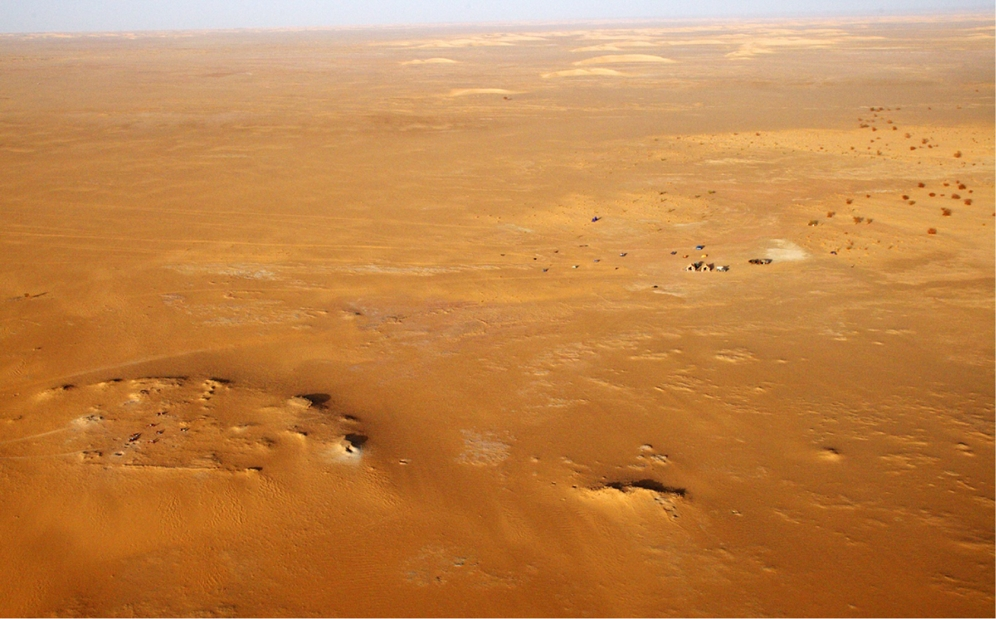
Aerial view of Gobero archaeological site in Niger from Holocene.

The Kiffian culture is a prehistoric industry, or domain, that existed between approximately 8,000 BC and 6,000 BC in the Sahara Desert, during the African humid period referred to as the Neolithic Subpluvial. Human remains from this culture were found in 2000 AD at a site known as Gobero, located in Niger in the Ténéré Desert. The site is known as the largest and earliest burial place of Stone Age people in the Sahara desert.

== Characteristics ==
The Kiffians were skilled hunters. Bones of many large savannah animals that were discovered in the same area suggest that they lived on the shores of a lake that was present during the Holocene Wet Phase, a period when the Sahara desert was verdant and wet.

A craniometric analysis by Sereno et al. suggests that this early Holocene population was related to the Late Pleistocene Iberomaurusians and early Holocene Capsians of the Maghreb, as well as mid-Holocene Mechta groups.

Based on dental evidence, Joel D. Irish of Liverpool John Moores University suggests sub-Saharan West African affinities for the Kiffians, in turn suggesting that the common ancestors of West African and Proto-Bantu peoples may have originated in the southwestern region of the Sahara amid the Kiffian period at Gobero, and may have migrated southward from the Sahara into various parts of West Africa (e.g., Benin, Cameroon, Ghana, Nigeria, Togo) as a result of desertification of the Green Sahara in 7000 BCE. From parts of southeast Nigeria and Cameroon, agricultural Proto-Bantu peoples began to migrate, and amid migration, diverged into East Bantu peoples (e.g., Democratic Republic of Congo) and West Bantu peoples (e.g., Congo, Gabon) between 2500 BCE and 1200 BCE.

=== Language ===
Kiffians may have been Nilo-Saharan or Niger-Congo speakers.

== Decline ==
Traces of the Kiffian culture do not exist after 6,000 BC, as the Sahara went through a dry period for the next thousand years. After this time, the Tenerian culture colonized the area.

== See also ==
- Aterian
- Ifri n'Amr or Moussa
- Kelif el Boroud
