= Gobero =

Archaeological site in Niger

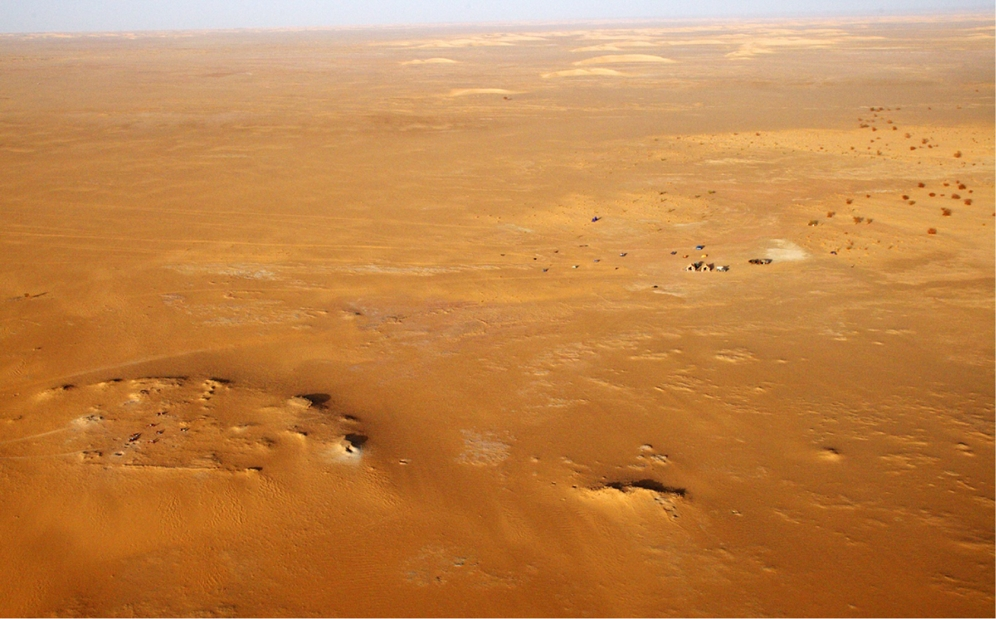
- Aerial view of Gobero

- Location in Niger
- 17°5′N 9°31′E
- Periods: Holocene
- Cultures: Kiffian, Tenerian
- Location: Agadez, Niger

History
- Built: c. 8000 BCE
- Abandoned: c. 3000 BCE

Site notes
- Archaeologists: Paul Sereno
- Discovered: 13 October 2000 by Mike Hettwer

The Gobero archaeological site, dating to around 8000 BCE, is the oldest known cemetery in the Sahara Desert. The site contains important information for archaeologists on how early humans adapted to a constantly changing environment. Gobero is located in the Ténéré desert of Niger, and is named after the Tuareg name for the region. It is the type site of the Holocene era Kiffian culture and Tenerian culture.

== Site ==
The area was once the location of a freshwater lake named Lake Gobero, around 3 km in diameter and 3 m in depth. There are eight sites that make up Gobero: G1, G2, G3, G4, G5, G6, G7, and G8, five of which (G1, G2, G3, G5, and G8) have funerary and habitation remains.

Site G1 is a dune that rises from the lake basin to an elevation of 56.035 metres (183.84 ft) above sea level and extends from east to west. It contains 19 excavated burials, 20 individuals in total. Site G2 is a hill between Site G1 and 3 that contains four burials. G3 is 300 metres (980 ft) northwest of G1 and contains 48 burials with 51 individuals total. Site G8 is 6.5 kilometres (4.0 mi) west of G3 and contains some human burials as well as lithic artifacts and pottery. The time frame of the site has been divided into four phases: Phase I dates from around 14,000-7700 BCE and is characterized by weakening monsoons and the aridification of the area, which created the earliest paleodunes at the site. Phase II dates from 7700-6200 BCE and is characterized by a wet climate and the first evidence of occupation by a fisher-gatherer group known as the Kiffians. The next phase is an interruption in the occupation of the site from 6200–5200 BCE due to the return of dry and arid conditions making the site uninhabitable. Phase III dates from 5200 BCE to 2200 BCE and is characterized by the second main occupation of the site at Gobero by a group known as the Tenerians. The final Phase, Phase IV, dates from 2500 BCE to 300 BCE and is the period in which the Sahara dries out once more, ending any occupation.

A wealth of lithic artifacts were recovered from sites G1 and G3, though most came from the surface. A total of 4,685 artifacts came from G1 and 11,503 came from G3. These included cores, blanks, endscrapers, perforators, burins, backed tools, notches, denticulates, truncations, geometric tools, sidescrapers, arrowheads, tenerian disks, bifacial tools, axes and adzes, grinding stones and polished axes and other retouched tools.

4,646 potsherds were collected during excavations in 2005-2006, all from G1 and G3. Vessel shapes were open and closed bowls and jars. Types of decorative techniques for the pots included rocker stamping, mainly found at site G1, decorations with cord-wrapped tools, and decorations made with combs. Some decoration styles included plain zigzags, straight zigzags, curved zigzags, zigzags that form fishnet patterns, and dotted zigzags.

== Excavations ==
The site was discovered by photographer Mike Hettwer on 13 October 2000, part of a team led by University of Chicago paleontologist and geologist Paul Sereno. His previous expeditions to the region had uncovered numerous fossils, including those of the formerly unknown dinosaur Nigersaurus and the crocodylomorph Sarcosuchus.

The sheer size and scope of the find, including traces of pottery, human remains, and quantities of aquatic-environment animal bones, suggested the site dated to the early- to mid-Holocene, or "Green Sahara" period (7500–3500 BCE).

In 2005, Sereno organized an international team of archaeologists to explore the site. These archaeologists discovered that Gobero had been almost continually inhabited for 5,000 years, beginning around 8000 BCE onwards when the area fronted a large lake. The 2007 and 2008 expeditions had to be canceled due to hostilities between Nigerian government forces and Tuareg tribesmen. The first comprehensive report on Gobero was published by Sereno in August 2008, and he returned again to the region in 2011.

== Human occupation ==
=== Kiffian culture ===
Evidence of human occupation at Gobero started during the Early Holocene, dating around 7550 BCE to 6250 BCE (9500 to 8200 BP). The Early Holocene occupation is associated with the Kiffian culture: they were tall (as much as 6-foot 8-inches). According to Sereno (2008), "Their crania were long and low and are characterized by a distinct occipital bun, flattened sagittal profile, pentagonal posterior outline, broad proportions across the zygoma and interorbital region, broad nasal aperture, and negligible alveolar prognathism". They were heavily muscled hunter-fishers, they left a distinctive pottery with wavy lines and probably remained in the region until around 6000 BCE. A radiogenic strontium isotopic analysis done on the burials at the G3 area of the site show limited variability in the mobility of the group: people stayed and lived in the area for most of their lives, and it was only towards the end of this occupation that evidence indicating possible mobility started appearing. Artifacts associated with this occupation at the Gobero site include microliths, bone harpoons and hooks, dotted wavy-line pottery, and zigzag impressed motifs.

=== Tenerian culture ===
The Middle Holocene occupation is associated with the Ténérians, who settled the area 1,000 or more years after the Kiffians, 6250 BCE to 2550 BCE (8200 to 4500 BP). According to Sereno, "Their crania are long, high and narrow, and their faces are taller with considerable alveolar prognathism". This was a nomadic herding culture. Artifacts found in association include bones and tusks from fauna, projectile points, ceramics, ivory, bone and shell ornaments. There are also middens with remains of catfish, tilapia, hippos, antelope, soft shell turtles, crocodile, and domesticated cattle.

== Burials ==
At least 182 burial sites were found at Gobero. Of these, 67 have been excavated, and some were found to have pottery and other artifacts located around them. Earlier burials, usually those associated with the early occupation, have bones that are very dark in color which was most likely caused by their submersion when the lake levels rose. The early burials had tight constriction of the legs, which were usually pulled towards the torso, and arms. This suggests that their bodies might have been wrapped or bound with animal skin, ligament or basketry binding.

According to Sereno (2008), the later burials are "most commonly in semi-flexed postures on either left or right sides". Some of the remains uncovered at the area were decorated with jewelry, including a young girl wearing a bracelet made from the tusk of a hippo, and a man buried with the carapace of a turtle. A likely family grave was also found, with a woman and two children buried on their sides, facing each other and with hands entwined. They were buried with four hollow based points, and there was pollen evidence found at the probable family burial, suggesting that flowers decorated the grave.
