= A. J. Arkell =

British archaeologist and colonial administrator

- Born: 29 July 1898; Hinxhill, Kent, England
- Died: 26 February 1980 (aged 81); Chelmsford, England
- Scientific career
- Fields: Archaeology, foreign service (colonial administration)

Anthony John Arkell MBE MC FSA (29 July 1898 – 26 February 1980), known as A. J. Arkell, was a British archaeologist and colonial administrator noted for his work in the Sudan and Egypt.

== Biography ==
Anthony John Arkell was born at Hinxhill Rectory, Hinxhill, Kent, England. He was the son of Reverend John Norris and Jessie Arkell (née Bunting). He won a scholarship to Bradfield College, where he was head boy. He next won the Jordell Scholarship in Classics to The Queen's College, Oxford.

Arkell joined the Royal Flying Corps in 1916 and served with the 39th Squadron, now the Royal Air Force in World War I. On 20 March 1918, while on a night patrol with his gunner-observer First Air Mechanic Albert Stagg, the pair shot down a Gotha G.V bomber in their Bristol F.2 Fighter 'Devil-in-the-Dark'. The bomber came down in a bean field off Roman Road, 200 yards from Albert Dock, East Ham, near the north bank of the Thames. The then-nineteen year old collected several souvenirs from the wreckage – a piece blue camouflage canvas, charred wood, a cartridge case, and a plywood ammunition box. He later obtained a propeller. Arkell received the Military Cross and Stagg received the Military Medal for their actions.

He joined the Sudan Political Service in 1920 and was appointed Assistant District Commissioner for Darfur in Sudan in 1921. In 1925 he moved to Dar Masalit, and was appointed District Commissioner at Kosti from 1926-9 and later at Sennar. During his time in Kosti, Arkell was instrumental in ending the slave trade between the Sudan and Ethiopia, arresting dealers and establishing villages for the freed slaves, who named themselves 'Beni Arkell', the "Sons of Arkell". It was for this humanitarian service that he was awarded the MBE in 1928, and the Order of the Nile (4th class) in 1931. He was acting governor of the province of Darfur from 1932 to 1937. While District Commissioner and Governor, he published articles in the Sudan Notes and Records on many topics, including archaeology, anthropology, geography, and science. While on leave he learnt excavation techniques on British sites under Sir Mortimer Wheeler. In 1938 he was appointed the first Commissioner for Archaeology and Anthropology for the Sudan. He was instrumental in the creation in the National Museum of Antiquities in Khartoum. He encouraged Sudanese students and others to take an interest in their own history and archaeology, appointing them to the Antiquities Service as regional inspectors. Systematic mapping and recording of sites and finds was also implemented; this work later aided in the UNESCO campaign to salvage monuments from the rising Lake Nasser. The work was interrupted by World War II during which he served as Chief Transport Officer in the Sudan from 1940–4. As soon as he returned to his post, the first official excavations carried out by the Antiquities Service began on a prehistoric site near the Khartoum civil hospital, and later at Shaheinab in 1949, revealing information about Sudanese prehistory for the first time. The excavations at Khartoum revealed the existence of a pottery-producing culture that utilised stone tools, described as 'Mesolithic' who lived in a period when the climate was much wetter. During the post-war years he edited the Sudan Notes and Records and became president of the Philosophical Society of the Sudan in 1947; he became a Life Member in 1949. Over the course of his career, Arkell was able to conduct several surveys, documenting among other things the existence of massive iron works in Meroe and the extensive predynastic culture of Egypt, notably the Badarians. He retired as Commissioner in 1949 and returned to England.

Upon his retirement from the Sudan he accepted the post of lecturer in Egyptian archaeology at University College London and became Honorary Curator of the Petrie Collection. Here he undertook the challenging task of unpacking the 800 crates into which the collection had been hurriedly packed in the early days of the war. Over the next 14 years he unpacked and stored the collection, cataloging at least a third of it himself. During this time he gained a deeper understanding for the history of Egypt, particularly the Predynastic period and in collaboration with his student P. J. Ucko published Review of Predynastic Development in the Nile Valley in Current Anthropology in 1965. He was promoted to Reader in Egyptian Archaeology in 1953 and retired in 1963. He had earlier published A History of the Sudan from the Earliest Times to 1821 in 1951. He had become an Honorary Member of the German Archaeological Institute in 1953. In 1955 he presented a history of the Darfur Province for the award of the degree of Bachelor of Letters from the University of Oxford. He was a Committee member of the Egypt Exploration Society for many years, and member of the Council of the Society of Antiquaries from 1956–7. In 1960, after a short course at Cuddesdon College, he had been ordained into Holy Orders. He served as curate at Great Missenden, where he lived from 1960–63. On his retirement he became vicar of Cuddington with Diton in Buckinghamshire. He died on 26 February 1980 in Chelmsford, Essex.

== Personal life ==
A. J. Arkell was married twice, first to Dorothy Davidson, with whom he had two children, and second to Joan Margaret Andrews. Arkell retired in 1963 and was ordained a minister. He had always wished to enter the church at the end of his life and so follow his father who, together with his mother, he spoke of with great respect. He died in Chelmsford on 26 February 1980, at the age of eighty-one.

== See also ==
- Neolithic Subpluvial
