= Proto-Afroasiatic =

Proto-Afroasiatic may refer to

- Proto-Afroasiatic language, the reconstructed common ancestor of the Afroasiatic languages
- Proto-Afroasiatic homeland, theories concerning the original homeland of Afroasiatic people
