= Iberomaurusian =

Archaeological culture in North Africa

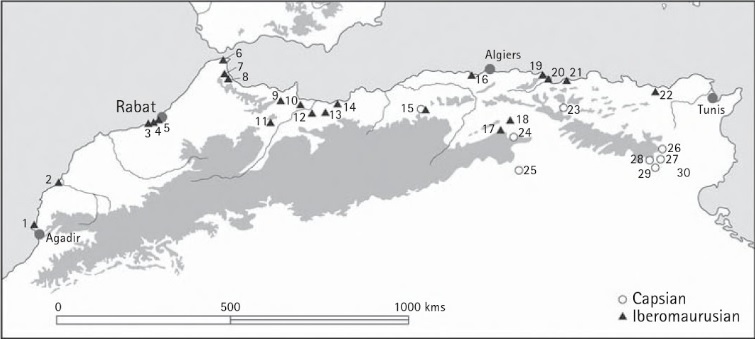
- Major Iberomaurusian and Capsian sites in Northwest Africa.
- Geographical range: Morocco, Algeria, Tunisia, and Libya (not shown on map)
- Period: Later Stone Age, Epipalaeolithic, or Upper Paleolithic
- Dates: c. 25/23,000 – c. 11,000 cal BP
- Type site: La Mouillah
- Major sites: Taforalt, Afalou bou Rhummel, Haua Fteah, Tamar Hat, Columnata
- Preceded by: Aterian
- Followed by: Mushabian, Cardium pottery, Capsian

The Iberomaurusian is a backed bladelet lithic industry found near the coasts of Morocco, Algeria, and Tunisia. It is also known from a single major site in Libya, the Haua Fteah, where the industry is known as the Eastern Oranian. (Note: The "Western Oranian" would refer to the Iberomaurusian in Morocco, Algeria, and Tunisia, but this expression is seldom used.) The Iberomaurusian seems to have appeared around the time of the Last Glacial Maximum (LGM), somewhere between c. 25,000 and 23,000 cal BP. It would have lasted until the early Holocene, c. 11,000 cal BP.

The name "Iberomaurusian" means "of Iberia and Mauretania", the latter being a Latin name for northwest Africa. Paul Maurice Pallary (1909) coined this term to describe assemblages from the site of La Mouillah in the belief that the industry extended over the strait of Gibraltar into the Iberian Peninsula. This theory is now generally discounted (Garrod 1938), but the name has persisted.

In Algeria, Tunisia, and Libya, but not in Morocco, the industry is succeeded by the Capsian industry, whose origins are unclear. The Capsian is believed either to have spread into north Africa from the Near East or to have evolved from the Iberomaurusian. In Morocco and western Algeria, the Iberomaurusian is succeeded by the Cardial culture after a long hiatus.

== Definition ==
Mr. Luis Siret had already noticed in Southeastern Spain a Palaeolithic industry that included a microlithic toolkit: small and narrow instruments, variously retouched and with these, colouring substances, grinding tools, and hammerstones. However, this very industry, we have noticed it in the La Mouillah shelters, close to Marnia [western Algeria]: it includes hammerstones, cores, simple and backed [à bord retaillés] blades, notched blades, an excessive profusion of very small blades with retouch on their backs and very sharp points [très petites lames à dos retouché et à pointe très aigüe [sic]], circular endscrapers, disks, alterative flake pebbles, and a whole set of tools for grinding colours: pebbles in greenish rock, sandstone wheels, pebbles with median depressions, still impregnated with red colour, and as colouring substances, hematites, ocre, oligist iron. Finally, some boring tools in polished bone and objects of adornment: ellongated pebbles and shells pierced for suspension. But nothing in the way of polished stone or pottery.

[...]

What clearly distinguishes this industry is the smallness of the toolkit, especially the crescent-shaped backed blades of which one finds thousands of examples. True geometric pieces (in the shape of trapeziums) are excessively rare, barely three parts per thousand, whereas in the ancient Neolithic with pottery and polished stone, small pieces of flint with geometric shapes are very common.

I named Ibero-Maurusian the period that characterises this industry.

— Paul Pallary, Instructions pour les recherches préhistoriques dans le nord-ouest de l'Afrique (1909, pp. 45-46, translation)

== Alternative names ==
Because the name of the Iberomaurusian implies Afro-European cultural contact now generally discounted, researchers have proposed other names:

- Mouillian or Mouillan, based on the site of La Mouillah (Goetz 1945–6).
- The Oranian, based on the Algerian region of Oran (Breuil 1930, Gobert et al. 1932, McBurney 1967, Barker et al. 2012).
- The Late Upper Palaeolithic (of Northwest African facies, Barton et al. 2005).

== Timeline of sites ==
What follows is a timeline of all published radiocarbon dates from reliably Iberomaurusian contexts, excluding a number of dates produced in the 1960s and 1970s considered "highly doubtful" (Barton et al. 2013). All dates, calibrated and Before Present, are according to Hogue and Barton (2016). The Tamar Hat date beyond 25,000 cal BP is tentative.

== Genetics ==
In 2005, the Mitochondrial DNA of 31 prehistoric skeletons dated from the site of Taforalt, Morocco in a cave called 'Grotte des pigeons' was analyzed by the Tunisian geneticist Rym Kefi (Pasteur Institute of Tunis) and her team. The remains at Taforalt were dated between 23,000 YBP and 10,800 YBP (Ferembach 1985). Later analysis of bones and charcoals using a high precision radiocarbon chronology showed that the Iberomaurusian industry appeared in TAF at least 22,093–21,420 Cal BP (calibrated YBP) (Barton et al. 2013). In 2016 she updated the research and wrote a new article which also included 8 skeletons from the Algerian Iberomaurusian site called 'Afalou'. The Afalou site is dated from 15,000 to 11,000 YBP. 23 individuals from the original 2005 Taforalt sample were determined in Kefi's 2016 article to be of the maternal genetic lineage U6 and of Eurasian haplogroups H, U, R0 and at the Algerian Afalou site maternal groups were JT, J, T, H, R0a1 and U. This suggests genetic flow between North Africa and southern Mediterranean littoral since the Epipaleolithic.

In an article entitled 'Pleistocene North African genomes link Near Eastern and sub-Saharan African human populations', Marieke Van de Loosdrecht et al. (2018) did a full genome-wide analysis including Y-DNA from seven ancient individuals from the Taforalt site. The fossils were directly dated to between 15,100 and 13,900 calibrated years before present. All males at Taforalt belonged to haplogroup E1b1b1a1 (M-78). This haplogroup occurs most frequently in present-day North and East African populations. The closely related E1b1b1b (M-123) haplogroup has been reported for Epipaleolithic Natufians and Pre-Pottery Neolithic Levantines. Loosdrecht states: "Present-day North Africans share a majority of their ancestry with present-day Near Easterners, but not with sub-Saharan Africans", although the predominant Y-DNA of the Maghreb is E-M81 (see Haplogroup E-Z827). Maternally, six individuals of the Taforalt remains bore the U6a haplogroup and one individual was of the M1b haplogroup, these Eurasian haplogroups proposed as markers for autochthonous Maghreb ancestry which might have been originally introduced into this region by a back-to-Africa migration from West Asia. A two-way admixture scenario using Natufian and modern sub-Saharan samples (including West Africans and the Tanzanian Hadza) as reference populations, inferred that the seven Taforalt individuals are best modeled genetically as 63.5% West-Eurasian-related and 36.5% sub-Saharan ancestry (with the latter having both West African-like and Hadza-like affinities), with no apparent gene flow from the Epigravettian culture of Paleolithic southern Europe. However, the Sub-Saharan African DNA in Taforalt individuals was not found to have a good proxy in any present-day or ancient Holocene African groups. It was also found that if Iberomaurusians harbor sub-Saharan African-like ancestry, they would fail as a possible contributing source for Natufians or other Middle Eastern groups, except if the sub-Saharan African geneflow postdated Iberomaurusian geneflow into the Levant, or was a locally confined phenomenon. Jeong (2020) indicated that the Sub-Saharan African DNA of the Taforalt population has similarity with the remnant of a more basal African lineage (e.g. a basal Eurasian and/or basal West African lineage).

Iosif Lazaridis et al. (2018), as summarized by Rosa Fregel (2021), contested the conclusion of Loosdrecht (2018) and argued instead that the Iberomaurusian population of Upper Paleolithic North Africa, represented by the Taforalt sample, "can be better modeled as an admixture between a Dzudzuana [West Eurasian] component and a sub-Saharan African component" (or an "Ancient North African" component, "that may represent an even earlier split than the Basal Eurasians"). They are modeled as deriving 55% of their ancestry from the Dzudzuana-like group and 45% from the African group. Iosif Lazaridis et al. (2018) also argued that an Iberomaurusian/Taforalt-like population contributed to the genetic composition of Natufians "and not the other way around", and that this Iberomaurusian/Taforalt lineage also contributed around 13% ancestry to modern West Africans "rather than Taforalt having ancestry from an unknown Sub-Saharan African source". Fregel (2021) summarized: "More evidence will be needed to determine the specific origin of the North African Upper Paleolithic populations." Later, Iosif Lazardis documented that the Natufians had a total of 9.1% non-Eurasian ancestry, and the explanation by the geneticist was because of their partial descent from the Paleolithic Iberomaurusians, whose contributions were estimated at 22% in Natufians. In fact, a total of 41.4% non-Eurasian ancestry is present in Taforalt from Morocco.

Martiniano et al. (2022) later reassigned all the Taforalt samples to haplogroup E-M78 and none to E-L618, the predecessor to E-V13.

D'Atanasio et al. (2023) found that Iberomaurusian-like ancestry was characterizing for the unsampled "ancient Green Saharan" population about 12,000-5,000 years ago, and that modern-day Fula people derive around 30% of their ancestry from this ancient Saharan population, which was "modeled as a sister group of ancient Northern Africans, or alternatively, as an outgroup of all the "Eurasian-ancestry" enriched groups".

A study in 2025 by researchers from the Max Planck Institute for Evolutionary Anthropology in Leipzig sequenced two individuals from Takarkori (7,000 YBP), and discovered that most of their ancestry was from an unknown ancestral North African lineage, related to the non-Eurasian admixture component found in Iberomaurusians. However, in contrast to the Iberomaurusian Taforalt remains who showed roughly half as many Neanderthal variants and ancestry as Eurasians (and are modeled as roughly half Western Eurasian in ancestry), Takarkori samples had much less admixture from Neanderthals, but more than contemporary Sub-Saharan Africans. The study concluded that the Takarkori people represented/mostly derive from an extinct population native to North Africa that diverged there before the Out-of-Africa migration that gave rise to Eurasians, but never left Africa and became mostly isolated (both from sub-Saharan African and Eurasian groups). The Tarkakori people were modeled as deriving 93% of their ancestry from this unknown African group and 7% from a Natufian-like population from the Middle East. The study also suggests "that the Taforalt ancestry is composed of a 60% contribution from a Natufian-like Levantine population, with the remaining 40% derived from a Takarkori-like ancestral North African population". According to the study, the Takarkori people were distinct, both from contemporary sub-Saharan Africans and from non-Africans/Eurasians, and had "only a minor component of non-African ancestry" but did "not carry sub-Saharan African ancestry, suggesting that, contrary to previous interpretations, the Green Sahara was not a corridor connecting Northern and sub-Saharan Africa." As per Johannes Krause of the Max Planck Institute, one of the authors of the study "The Takarkori lineage likely represents a remnant of the genetic diversity present in northern Africa between 50,000 and 20,000 years ago."

=== European and Levantine admixtures (c.5500 BC) ===
According to a 2023 genetic study, the Taforalt groups progressively mixed with European and Levantine migrations during the Neolithic from circa 5500 BC, forming two additional major genetic groups in northwestern Africa:

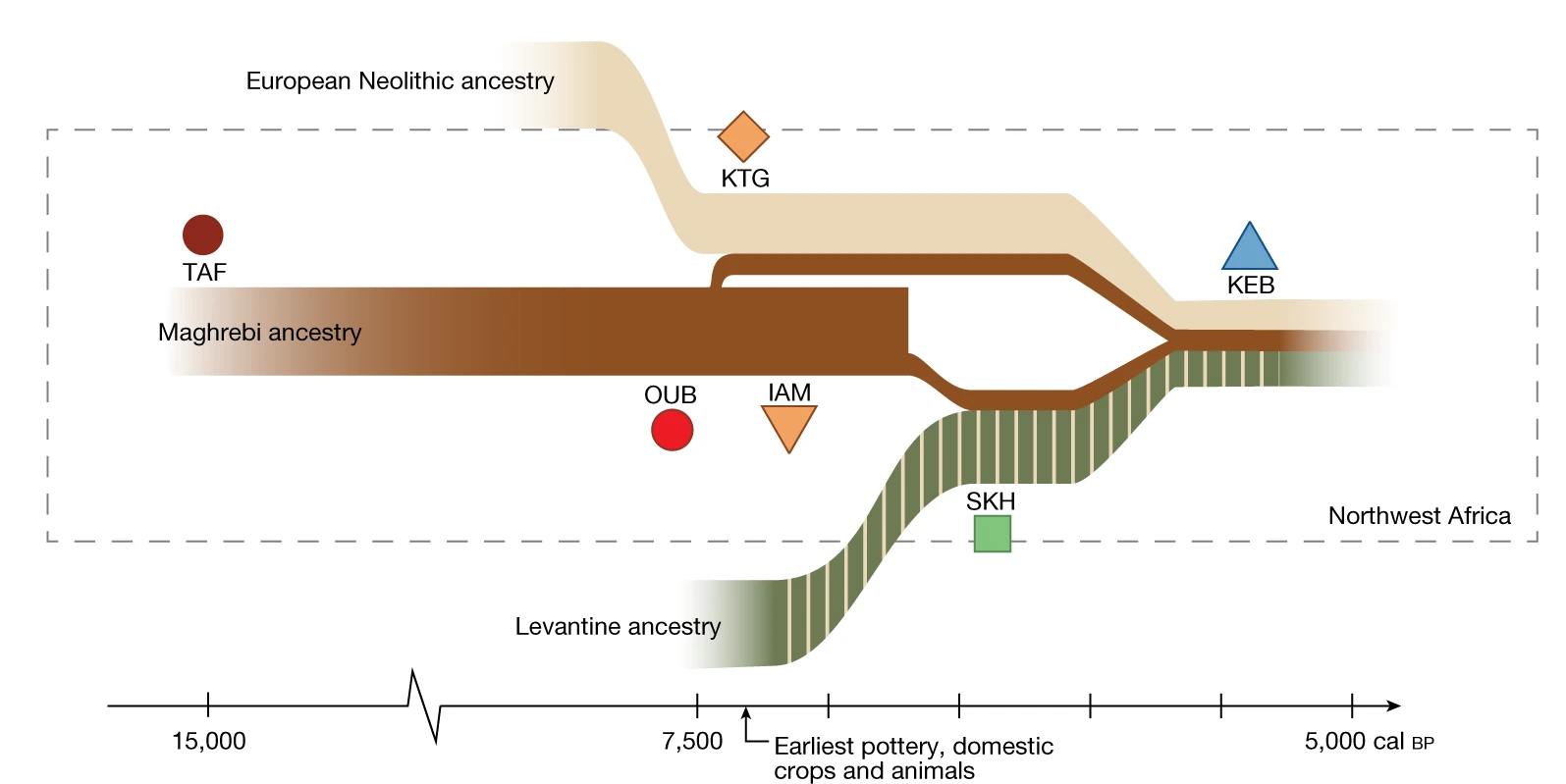
Summary of inferred population history of the Stone Age Maghreb. The Skhirat-Rouazi (SKH) branch represents a wave a Levantine migration circa 5000 BCE (■), with some local admixture (■).

- 1) The first group (■) named Kaf Taht el-Ghar (KTG, dated 5400–4900 BCE) consists of Neolithic European agriculturists who crossed the Strait of Gibraltar and settled in North Africa around 5,500 BCE, bringing a Neolithic way of life and Cardium pottery, and marginally interbreeding with the Taforalt (TAF) component (their genetic makeup is modelled at 72% Anatolian Neolithic, since Neolithic Europeans are the result of the demic expansion from Anatolia that accompanied the introduction of agriculture in Europe, 10% WHG and 18% Taforalt Maghrebi).
- 2) The second group (■) is Skhirat-Rouazi (SKH, dated 4,700–4,100 BCE), a population whose principal ancestry was introduced to Northwestern Africa during the Middle Neolithic through a westward expansion of pastoralists originating in the Levant, who entered Northeast Africa via the Sinai around 6,000 BCE, and who, around 5000 BCE, introduced animal husbandry and a distinct pottery style to Northwest Africa. This group correlates closely with the introduction of southwest Asian domesticates such as sheep, goats, and cattle, coinciding with the rise of Saharan cattle pastoralism and the appearance of Ashakar Ware pottery in the Maghreb, and may have contributed to the early dispersal of Afro-Asiatic languages across North Africa. They also admixed with local Maghrebi groups (their genetic makeup is modelled at 76% Levant Neolithic and 24% Taforalt Maghrebi). This genetic group was identified as the main ancestry of an ancient Egyptian, Old Kingdom individual (NUE001), dated to 2855–2570 BC.

These three distinct genetic groups progressively blended towards the end of the Neolithic.

== Food consumption ==
Despite researchers thinking they ate mostly game meat being hunter-gatherers, further study has indicated that their diet included a substantial incorporation of plant-based foods. This evidence challenges the prevailing notion of solely a high reliance on animal proteins in pre-agricultural human societies.

== See also ==
- Afroasiatic Urheimat
- Aterian
- Mushabian
- Taforalt
- Ifri N'Ammar
- Mechta-Afalou
- Haua Fteah

== Sources ==
- Morez Jacobs, Adeline; Irish, Joel D.; Cooke, Ashley; Anastasiadou, Kyriaki; Barrington, Christopher; Gilardet, Alexandre; Kelly, Monica; Silva, Marina; Speidel, Leo; Tait, Frankie; Williams, Mia; Brucato, Nicolas; Ricaut, Francois-Xavier; Wilkinson, Caroline; Madgwick, Richard; Holt, Emily; Nederbragt, Alexandra J.; Inglis, Edward; Hajdinjak, Mateja; Skoglund, Pontus; Girdland-Flink, Linus (2 July 2025). "Whole-genome ancestry of an Old Kingdom Egyptian". Nature. 644 (8077): 714–721. Bibcode:2025Natur.644..714M. doi:10.1038/s41586-025-09195-5. ISSN 1476-4687. PMC 12367555. PMID 40604286.
- Simões, Luciana G.; Günther, Torsten; Martínez-Sánchez, Rafael M.; Vera-Rodríguez, Juan Carlos; Iriarte, Eneko; Rodríguez-Varela, Ricardo; Bokbot, Youssef; Valdiosera, Cristina; Jakobsson, Mattias (June 2023). "Northwest African Neolithic initiated by migrants from Iberia and Levant". Nature. 618 (7965): 550–556. Bibcode:2023Natur.618..550S. doi:10.1038/s41586-023-06166-6. ISSN 1476-4687. PMC 10266975. PMID 37286608.
