= Taforalt =

Cave and archaeological site in Morocco

- Grotte des Pigeons
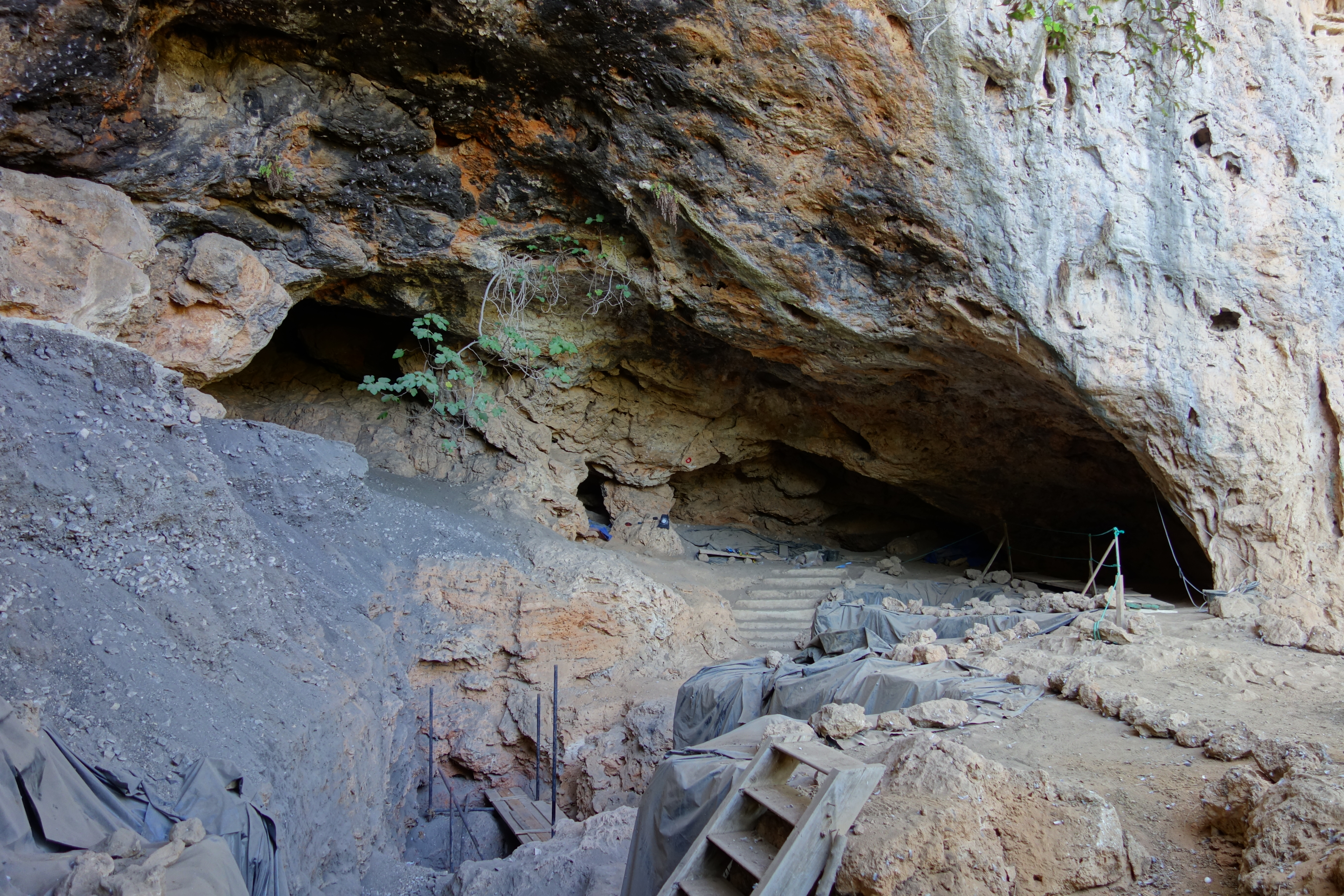
- The cave in September 2017

- location in Morocco
- 34°48′38″N 2°24′30″W
- Periods: Middle Paleolithic, Epipalaeolithic
- Cultures: pre-Mousterian, Aterian, Iberomaurusian
- Location: near Tafoughalt village, Iznasen mountains
- Region: Morocco

Site notes
- Excavation dates: 1944–1947, 1950–1955, 1969-1977, 2003-2018, 2022
- Archaeologists: Ruhlmann, Roche, Bouzouggar, Barton, Humphrey
- Public access: No

Taforalt, or Grotte des Pigeons, is a cave in the province of Berkane, Aït Iznasen region, Morocco, possibly the oldest cemetery in North Africa. It contained at least 34 Iberomaurusian adolescent and adult human skeletons, as well as younger ones, from the Upper Palaeolithic between 15,100 and 14,000 calendar years ago. There is archaeological evidence for Iberomaurusian occupation at the site between 23,200 and 12,600 calendar years ago, as well as evidence for Aterian occupation as old as 85,000 years.

== Site description ==
La Grotte des Pigeons is a cave in eastern Morocco near the village of Tafoughalt. Human occupation and natural processes in the cave have produced a 10 m (32.8 ft) thick sequence of archaeological layers dating between at least 85,000 and 10,000 years ago. These occupation layers include pre-Mousterian, Aterian, and Iberomaurusian lithic industries, plus an unusual non-Levallois industry between the Aterian and the Iberomaurusian dating to c. 24,500 cal BP. These industries date from the Middle Stone Age and the Later Stone Age. Excavations of the Iberomaurusian layers dating from 15,100 to 14,000 years ago have recovered dozens of burials with some showing evidence of postmortem processing. Some burials suggest potential ritualistic practices, as evidenced by the inclusion of animal remains such as horns, mandibles, a hoof, and a tooth, alongside plant macro-remains like Ephedra, acorns (Quercus), and pine nuts (Pinus pinaster). Ephedra, known for its extensive use in traditional medicine, may have held significant importance in the burial rituals, potentially serving both symbolic and practical purposes during these activities. The deep and highly stratified cave floor has yielded hearths, lithics, and shell beads, among a variety of artefacts of varying ages. The dryness of the cave has contributed to the notable level of preservation found among the remains and artefacts.

== Geography ==
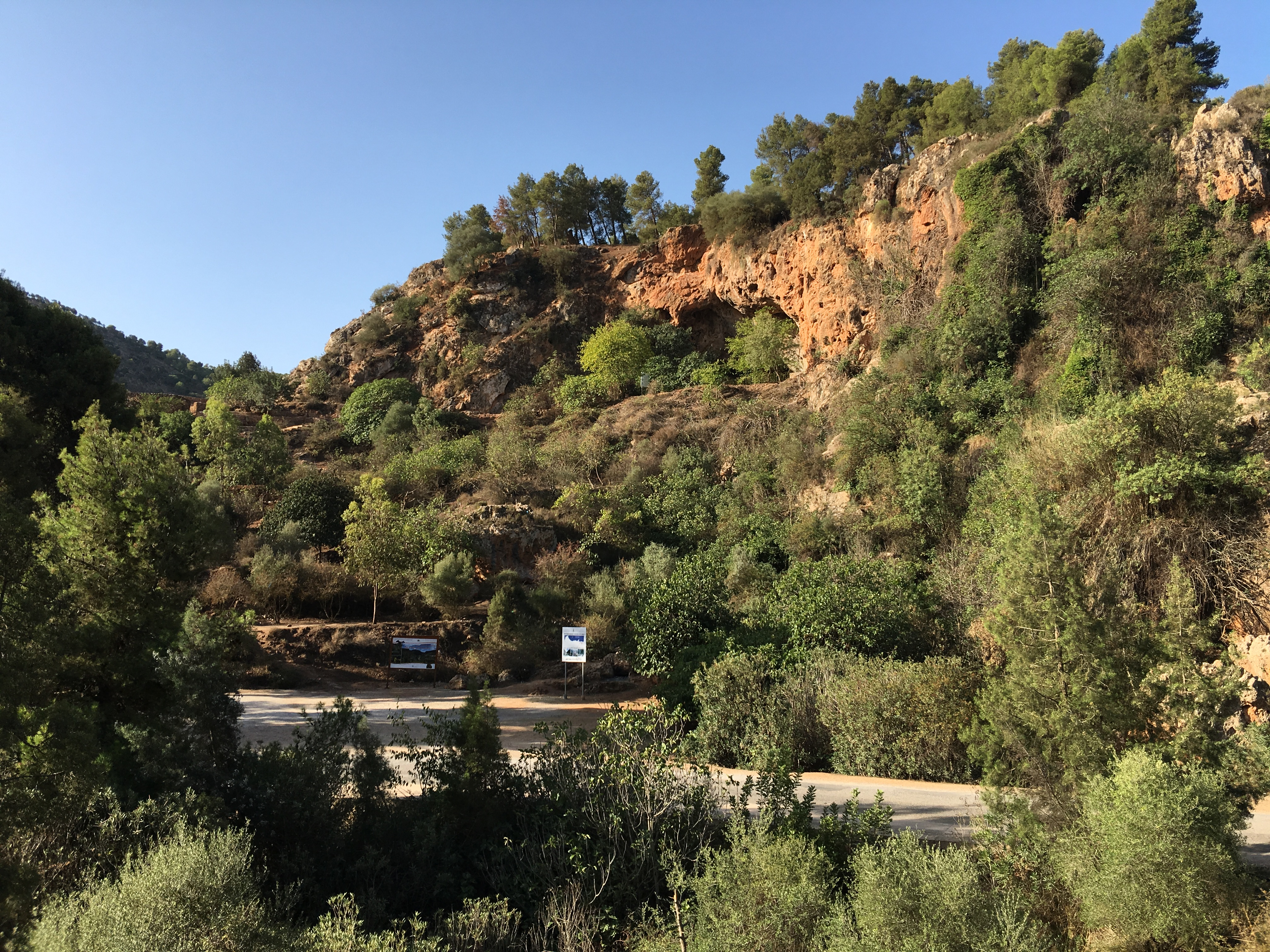
The cave, seen from below

The site is located around steep hills, rocky mountains, and the natural vegetation of the thermo-Mediterranean biozone including Tetraclinis articulate and Pinus halenpensis. The area itself is located in the Eastern part of Morocco near the community of Taforalt (Tafoughalt) at (34°48′38″ N, 2°24′30″ W). The large mouth of the cave opens to the northeast and has an area > 400 m^{2} (4,305.6 sq ft). Today the site lies around 40 km (24.9 mi) from the Mediterranean coast and at an altitude of 720 m (2,362.2 ft) above sea level.

== Culture ==
The earliest layers of human habitation in the cave, dating from 85,000 to 82,000 years ago, contain evidence of a pre-Mousterian industry where no evidence of the Levallois lithic technology is apparent. The following (newer) layers contain side scrapers, small radial Levallois cores, and thin, bifacially worked foliate points typical of the Aterian technological industries. These Aterian layers were dated to come from approximately 32,000 to >40,000 years ago, though other research has found a non-Levallois industry continuing at the site until 25,000 years ago. By about 21,000 years ago, the Iberomaurusian industry marked by microlithic backed bladelets became the dominant archaeological material, which has been found at the site. These Iberomaurusian layers contain microlithics, ostrich egg shells, potentially ritualized primary and secondary burials, and a notable increase in land snail remains indicating a shift in dietary practices.

== Excavation history ==
The cave was discovered in 1908 and was excavated in 1944–1947, 1950–1955, 1969–1977, and 2003–2018. Much of the field records from the early excavations have been lost. In 1951, Roche's team discovered human remains associated with the Iberomaurusian. The Roche excavation encountered 10 metres of archaeological deposits with the Iberomaurusian occupying the top 2 to 3 m (6.6 to 9.8 ft). This same stratification has been encountered in the subsequent excavations in other parts of the cave. Because of the dozens of skeletons located by Roche in the 1950s and the burials located during the Bouzouggar, Barton, and Humphrey excavations taking place since 2003, Grotte des Pigeons represents what is likely the earliest and most extensively used known prehistoric cemetery in North Africa.

== Stratigraphy ==
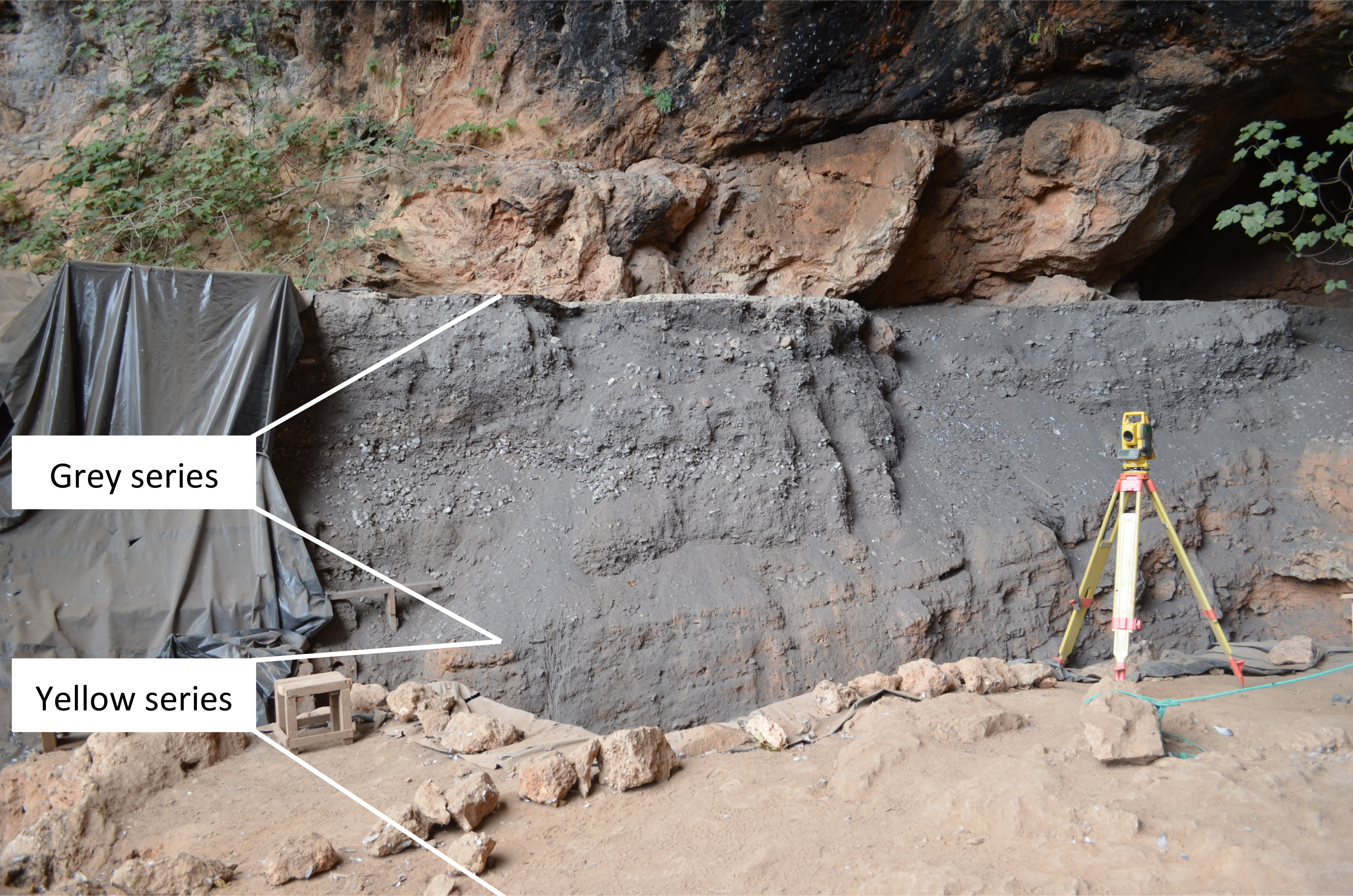
Taforalt's stratigraphy in Sector 8. The yellow series appears grey because some of the overlying grey sediment has trickled onto it.

The stratigraphy in Grotte des Pigeons, going as deep as 10 m (32.8 ft) as in the case of Roche's excavations, differs slightly throughout the cave but follows a simple pattern based on their colour: the Grey Series overlies the Yellow Series. The Yellow series goes from the beginning of the occupation of the cave about 85,000 years ago to c. 15,000 cal BP. The overlying Grey Series dates from c. 15,000 to 12,500 cal BP ago, and hence accumulated rapidly in some 2500 years. The Grey Series, associated with the later Iberomaurusian, is characterized by extensive hearths and charcoal deposits (hence its colour), along with all of the site's burials. The Yellow Series is associated with the earlier Iberomaurusian, as well as with Levallois artefacts of the Aterian industry. The increased density of artefacts and evidence of food production in the Grey Series is seen as a sign of year-round occupation at the site whereas the Yellow Series is seen as evidence of seasonal habitation with occasional periods without humans. There is a theorized 2,000 year gap of habitation between 18,000 and 20,000 uncal BP with this sterile layer being noted in Sector 8 of Barton's excavations, though other excavations near the mouth of the cave challenge this finding.

== Dating ==
With 67 radiocarbon dates, Taforalt is the most extensively dated site of the North African Later Stone Age. Starting in the 1960s, it has been dated with both conventional and AMS radiocarbon dating, OSL, TL, and U-series. Looking at all dates recovered from excavations, the habitation dates in this cave stretch from 12,500 cal BP ago to 85,000 years ago with a shift to sedentary habitation about 15,000 cal BP. The local environmental data helps establish the seasonality of the site as much of the modern vegetation was utilized by the prehistoric population and follows a set seasonal process of food production. The presence of plant remains that would have been harvested in spring indicate that the cave or nearby environs were inhabited during that season. Proxies for environmental conditions during the phases of cave occupation are available from both wood charcoal and small mammal evidence. A feature of considerable interest in the charcoal record concerns the fluctuating presence of cedar in the C–F sequence. Cedrus currently grows in Morocco only from ≈1,300–2,600 m in the Rif, the Middle Atlas, and Eastern High Atlas, and its presence throughout the Taforalt record highlights a significant vegetation shift since the Holocene. In particular, the vegetation excavated by Barton in Group E is dominated by the presence of Cedrus atlantica and deciduous Quercus, with the latter declining at the expense of Cedrus.^{Needs clarification} This is consistent with environmental cooling and drying that comes with a change to a montane climate. This climatic shift coincides with the dates recovered from Group E and validates the dates recovered there.

== Archaeological finds ==
=== Artefacts ===
The lithic collections recovered from the excavations at Grotte des Pigeons reflect a wide range of technologies and include unretouched and retouched flakes and bladelets, single and opposed platform bladelet cores, river cobbles, microburins, La Mouillah points, backed bladelets, Ouchtata bladelets, obtuse-ended backed bladelets, side scrapers, large bifacial tools, shell beads associated with bifacial foliates and tanged tools associated with the Aterian culture, and potential rock palettes.

=== Faunal remains ===
Animal remains found at the site largely appear to be food waste though excavations in the 1950s and 2000s, 2010s have revealed burials associated with antelope horns, bovine horns, and at least one horse tooth. The more sedentary Grey Series phase includes a substantial amount of land Mollusca remains in conjunction with hearths indicating extensive land snail collection and cooking. The earliest layers from approximately 80,000 years ago contain shell beads of the N. gibbosulus however analysis of these shells indicate that they were collected along the Mediterranean shore after they had been dead. Ash lenses from the Aterian levels around 80,000 BP contain large Otala punctate indicating small scale exploitation of land snails prior to the Grey Series.

=== Floral remains ===
The vegetation species found inside the cave provide an idea what the environment was like during periods of human habitation with the charred remains of holm oak (Quercus ilex L.) acorns, Maritime pine (Pinus pinaster Aiton) pine nuts, Juniper (Juniperus phoenicea L.), Terebinth pistachio (Pistacia terebinthus L.), and wild oat (Avena sp.) being recovered after likely being collected and processed by the previous inhabitants.

=== Human remains ===
Sector 10, excavated by Humphrey, and the burial deposits excavated by Roche in the 1950s, form a contiguous and spatially demarcated collective burial area with dozens of closely spaced burials. The presence of both articulated and disarticulated bones indicates extensive use and reuse of the burial area with evidence of secondary burial and selective bone removal being practiced, often disturbing or truncating earlier burials. Some burials were covered by large stones preventing future disturbances by burials. The Roche excavations originally estimated that they had recovered the remains of approximately 180 individuals, but subsequent research adjusted this estimate to between 35 and 40 individuals. These remains were not directly dated by Roche but based on the stratigraphy they were from a greater depth, and therefore greater age, than those in Sector 10. The recent excavations taking place in Sector 10 have recovered thirteen partially articulated skeletons along with a sample of disarticulated bones. Seven bone samples from Sector 10 yielded age estimates between approximately 15,077 and 13,892 years ago, corresponding to the base of the Grey Series deposits seen in Sector 8 excavations. Burials situated toward the front of the cave and those higher within the deposits are likely to be progressively younger, and hence contemporary with higher levels in the Grey Series deposits recorded in Sector 8. A range of funerary practices is apparent based on the grave excavations that have taken place. Some remains appear to have been primary inhumations while others appear to have sustained secondary inhumation after removal for potentially ritual practices. Evidence of deliberate post-mortem modification include cut marks that are not indicative of cannibalism and extensive ochre colouring with one grave, Grave XII, containing Individual 1 with both cut marks and ochre colouring present on the majority of the nearly intact skeleton. Roche's excavations in the 1950s yielded a single mandible from the Aterian levels.

A 2003 analysis of masticatory and non-masticatory dental modifications among the remains recovered in the 1950s reflected a very high rate (90%) of avulsion of the upper central incisors which subsequently led to increased usage of the proximal teeth. Ritual tooth removal is known elsewhere in this region at other points in prehistory and history and likely took place during the entrance to adulthood. The food processing tasks of the teeth are reflected in the heavy chipping, perhaps indicative of a gritty diet involving bone and shell. Half of the surviving teeth (51.2%) exhibited carious lesions while archaeological hunter-gatherers are expected to range between 0% – 14.3% and agriculturalists range between 2.2% - 48.1%. These numbers are likely a result of the acorns and pine nuts which would have been collected and processed, resulting in fermentable carbohydrates. The women in the population do not reflect the same proximal tooth wear as their upper central incisors were typically not removed.

A 2000 analysis of non-metric dental traits indicated genetic continuity from the terminal Pleistocene onward in the Iberomaurusian and Capsian areas. Based on dentition, Joel D. Irish found a relationship between the Iberomaurusians, particularly those from Taforalt, and later Maghreb and other North African samples. Thus, some measure of long-term population continuity in the Maghreb and surrounding region is supported, whereas greater North African population heterogeneity during the Late Pleistocene is implied with strong differences with Jebel Sahaba, but similarities between Taforalt and Afalou.

In 1999, Colin Groves and Alan Thorne, in studying three Northern African samples from the Pleistocene/Holocene, Taforalt was described as "Caucasoid" and resembled late Pleistocene Europeans, while Afalou was Intermediate. In contrast, the Sudanese remains from Jebel Sahaba included was described as "Negroid".

== Occupation site utility ==
The inhabitants of Grotte des Pigeons were hunter-gatherers equipped with the knowledge of harvesting plants and animals as the archaeological context suggests some of the burials contained evidence of baskets and grind stones which were used for food preparation. Some of the foods harvested from their local environment included acorns, pine nuts, and land molluscs. The site exhibits evidence that the people that lived in this area used the cave year round by the Grey Series while staying there seasonally during the Yellow Series. The perforated marine shells present from the 85,000 – 82,000 year old level at Grotte des Pigeons and other sites in the nearby Maghreb dated from that period reflect an exchange network that likely existed in order to provide shells to communities 40 km from the coast (Taforalt) and further. While the meaning behind the beads cannot be discerned, the presence of an apparently widespread exchange network to facilitate their transport as well as their being worked for apparent ornamentation indicate some significance behind them.

== World Heritage status ==
This site was added to the UNESCO World Heritage Tentative List on 1 July 1995, in the Cultural category under the name "Grotte de Taforalt".

== Ancient DNA ==
In an article in 2005, the mitochondrial (female side) DNA of 31 skeletons from the site of Taforalt in the 'Grotte des pigeons' cave was analyzed by the Tunisian geneticist Rym Kefi (Pasteur Institute of Tunis) In 2016, Kefi wrote a follow up article: On the Origin of Iberomaurusians: New Data based on Ancient mitochondrial DNA and phylogenetic analysis of Afalou and Taforalt populations. With additional new data, the mitochondrial DNA of 23 individuals at Taforalt dated 23,000–10,800 YBP and 7 individuals at the similar Afalou site Mechta-Afalou in Algeria dated 15,000–11,000 YBP were analyzed. 19 of the 21 individuals at Taforalt are classified of Eurasian haplogroups H, U, JT, V. Two of the remaining individuals belong to the North African haplogroup U6. In 2018, van de Loosdrecht et al. performed the first genome-wide analysis on 7 individuals: 6 males and one female at Taforalt dated to between 15,100 and 13,900 cal BP. The Taforalt samples are the oldest human DNA samples from Africa yet recovered. Only five of the individuals, including four of the males, with higher coverage genomes were used in the nuclear DNA analysis. Nuclear DNA analysis showed that these Taforalt individuals were all closely related to each other, suggesting a population bottleneck event in their past." Loosdrecht found the Taforalt to be composed of three major components: a Holocene West-Eurasian/Levantine component, a Hadza hunter-gatherer component from Tanzania, and a West African component. According to Loosdrecht, the West-Eurasian component shows the relative closest genetic affinity for ancient Epipaleolithic Natufian individuals, with slightly greater affinity for the Natufians than later Neolithic Levantines. A two-way admixture scenario using Holocene Levantines and modern West African samples as reference populations inferred that the Taforalt individuals bore 63.5% Levantine-related and 36.5% Sub-Saharan African-related ancestries, with no evidence for additional gene flow from the Epigravettian culture of Upper Paleolithic Europe. The Taforalt individuals also show evidence of limited Neanderthal ancestry.

When compared against modern populations, the Taforalt individuals form a distinct cluster and do not cluster genetically with any modern population; however, they were found to cluster between Middle Easterners or modern North Africans and West/East Africans. The Taforalt individuals also exhibited higher levels of indigenous African ("Sub-Saharan African") ancestry than do modern North Africans. The Sub-Saharan African DNA in Taforalt individuals has the closest affinity, most of all, to that of modern West Africans (e.g. Yoruba, or Mende). In addition to having similarity with the remnant of a more basal Sub-Saharan African lineage (e.g., a basal West African lineage shared between Yoruba and Mende peoples), the Sub-Saharan African DNA in the Taforalt individuals of the Iberomaurusian culture may be best represented by modern West Africans. Aizpurua-Iraola, Julen et al. (2023) stated that none of the present-day (Hadza/East/West) or ancient Holocene African groups were found to be a suitable proxy population for the source of this component.

mtDNA and Y-DNA results (Loosdrecht et al. 2018)
Sample ID	mtDNA	Y-DNA
TAF009	U6a6b	E1b1b1a1b1
TAF010	U6a7b	E1b1b1a1
TAF011	U6a7	E1b1b1a1
TAF012	U6a7	N/A
TAF013	U6a7b	E1b1b1a1
TAF014	M1b	E1b1b1a1
TAF015	U6a1b	E1b1b

Taforalt individuals in Loosdrecht's study belonged to the mtDNA haplogroups U6a and M1b, as well as to the Y-DNA haplogroup E1b1b1a1 (M78), which is closely related to the E1b1b1b (M123) sublineage that has been observed in skeletal remains belonging to the Epipaleolithic Natufian and Pre-Pottery Neolithic cultures of the Levant, possibly suggesting geneflow.

According to Loosdrecht, since the Natufian samples, which are chronologically younger than the Taforalt samples by several thousands of years, were inferred to lack substantial African ancestry, the researchers also hypothesized that a Maghreb center of evolution for the Natufian-related ancestry could only be plausible if the admixture that was inferred for the Taforalt individuals either occurred after the population ancestral to the Natufians had moved into the Levant or if that admixture event was a locally confined phenomenon at Taforalt.

Iosif Lazaridis et al. (2018), as summarized by Rosa Fregel (2021), contested the conclusion of Loosdrecht (2018) and argued instead that the Iberomaurusian population of Upper Paleolithic North Africa, represented by the Taforalt sample, can be better modeled as an admixture between a Dzudzuana-like [West-Eurasian] component and an "Ancient North African" component, "that may represent an even earlier split than the Basal Eurasians." Iosif Lazaridis et al. (2018) also argued that an Iberomaurusian/Taforalt-like population contributed to the genetic composition of Natufians "and not the other way around", and that this Iberomaurusian/Taforalt lineage also contributed around 13% ancestry to modern West Africans "rather than Taforalt having ancestry from an unknown Sub-Saharan African source". Fregel (2021) summarized: "More evidence will be needed to determine the specific origin of the North African Upper Paleolithic populations."

Phenotypic analysis was performed on four of the Taforalt individuals with higher genomic coverage. The Taforalt individuals tested did not carry either of the derived SLC24A5 alleles associated with lighter skin color, the derived OCA2 allele associated with blue eye color, or the derived MCM6 allele associated with lactase persistence. However, they were found to carry the ancestral SLC24A4 allele associated with dark eye color, suggesting that the West-Eurasian migrant group may not have evolved light skin yet.

A 2025 study published in Nature by researchers from the Max Planck Institute for Evolutionary Anthropology in Leipzig sequenced two 7,000-year-old mummies from Libya's Takarkori rock shelter, and discovered that most of their ancestry was from a previously unknown, long-isolated ancestral North African lineage, related to the non Eurasian admixture component found in Iberomaurusians. The Tarkakori people were modeled as 93% from an unknown indigenous North African lineage that diverged prior to Out-of-Africa migration that gave rise to Eurasians, but never left Africa and became mostly isolated (both from sub-Saharan African and Eurasian groups), plus 7% from a Natufian-like population from the Middle East, and consequently, the Taforalt (Iberomaurusian) ancestry was modelled as a mix of 60% Natufian-like and 40% Takarkori-like ancestral North African components. This ancient North African population was genetically distinct from both modern sub-Saharan Africans and Eurasians, and had "only a minor component of non-African ancestry," but "had no sub-Saharan ancestry, suggesting that, contrary to previous interpretations, the Green Sahara was not a corridor connecting North and sub-Saharan Africa". Instead, their deep lineage shared closer ancient affinities to early Upper Paleolithic individuals like Zlatý kůň, who serve as a proxy for deep, pre-divergence Out-of-Africa ancestries. The Takarkori individuals also possessed a very small fraction of Neandertal DNA—roughly ten times less than Eurasians, but slightly more than contemporary sub-Saharan African populations.

David Schoenbrun, Christopher Ehret, Steven A. Brandt and Shomarka Keita (2025) have highlighted the problematic categorisation of genetic haplogroups characterised as ‘African’ and ‘Eurasian' in North African genome studies. In reference to the van de Loosdrecht et al. 2018 study on the epipalaeolithic Taforalt remains from Morocco, which identified the EM35 (primarily EM78) common in north-eastern Africa but characterised the mtDNA (female lineage haplogroups) of U6 and M1 as 'Eurasian', the authors questioned the classification of these maternal haplogroups despite their localised and long-established presence in ancient African populations. In their view, identifying a range of African populations may still remain an issue "since the idea of ‘African’ still gets stereotyped or restricted. (Accepting the southwestern Asian/Levantine geographical continuity with Africa eliminates a conceptual barrier related to racio-typological thinking permitting an Africasian construct analogous to Eurasian.)"

=== European and Levantine admixtures (c.5500 BC) ===
According to a 2023 genetic study, the Taforalt groups progressively mixed with European and Levantine migrations during the Neolithic from circa 5500 BC, forming two additional major genetic groups in northwestern Africa:

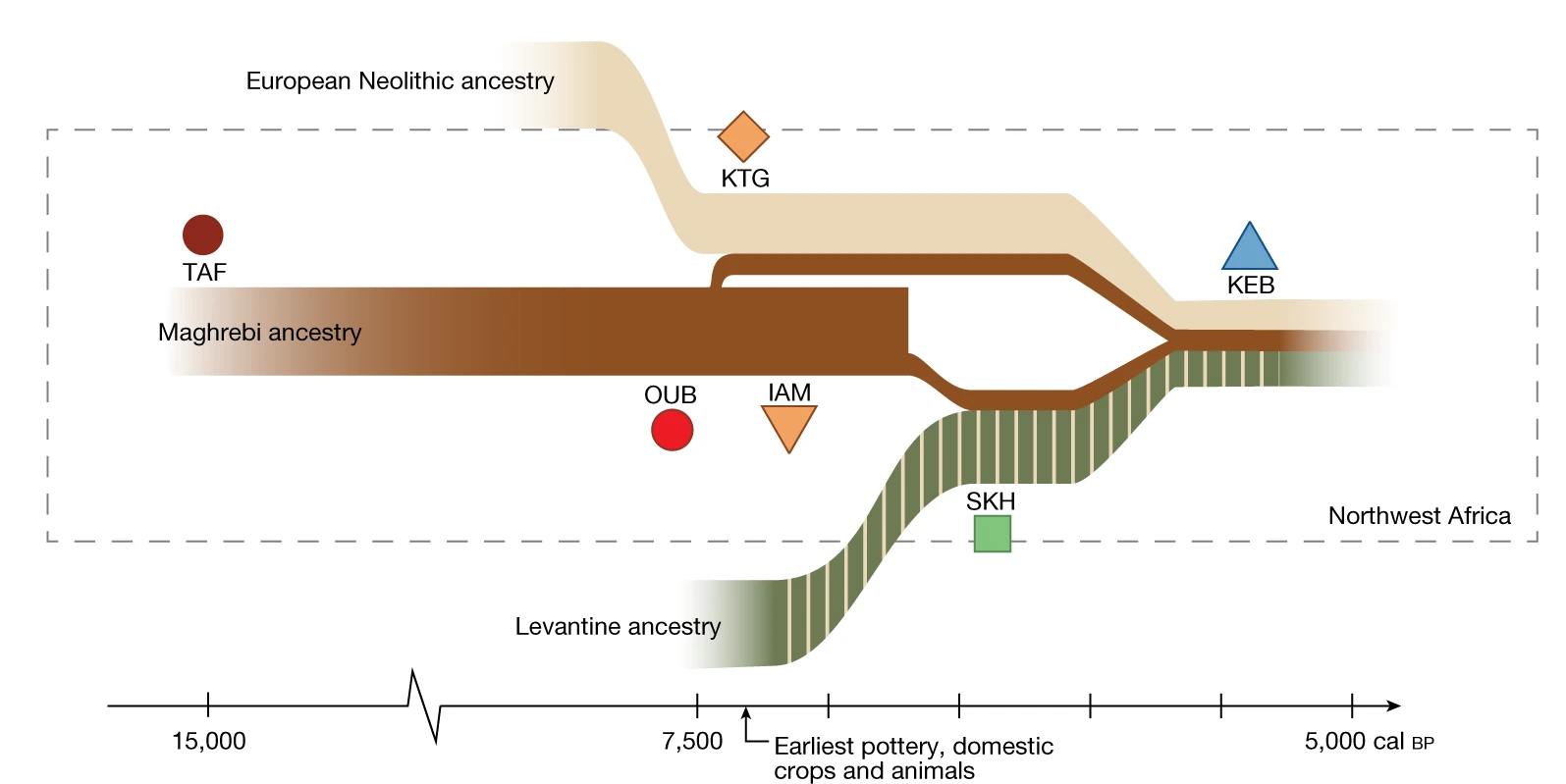
Summary of inferred population history of the Stone Age Maghreb. The Skhirat-Rouazi (SKH) branch represents a wave a Levantine migration circa 5000 BCE (■), with some local admixture (■).

- 1) The first group (■) named Kaf Taht el-Ghar (KTG, dated 5400–4900 BCE) consists of Neolithic European agriculturists who crossed the Strait of Gibraltar and settled in North Africa around 5,500 BCE, bringing a Neolithic way of life and Cardium pottery, and marginally interbreeding with the Taforalt (TAF) component (their genetic makeup is modelled at 72% Anatolian Neolithic, since Neolithic Europeans are the result of the demic expansion from Anatolia that accompanied the introduction of agriculture in Europe, 10% WHG and 18% Taforalt Maghrebi).
- 2) The second group (■) is Skhirat-Rouazi (SKH, dated 4,700–4,100 BCE), a population whose principal ancestry was introduced to Northwestern Africa during the Middle Neolithic through a westward expansion of pastoralists originating in the Levant, who entered Northeast Africa via the Sinai around 6,000 BCE, and who, around 5000 BCE, introduced animal husbandry and a distinct pottery style to Northwest Africa. This group correlates closely with the introduction of southwest Asian domesticates such as sheep, goats, and cattle, coinciding with the rise of Saharan cattle pastoralism and the appearance of Ashakar Ware pottery in the Maghreb, and may have contributed to the early dispersal of Afro-Asiatic languages across North Africa. They also admixed with local Maghrebi groups (their genetic makeup is modelled at 76% Levant Neolithic and 24% Taforalt Maghrebi). This genetic group was identified as the main ancestry of an ancient Egyptian, Old Kingdom individual (NUE001), dated to 2855–2570 BC.

These three distinct genetic groups progressively blended towards the end of the Neolithic.

== See also ==
- Ifri n'Ammar
- Kelif el Boroud
- Mechta-Afalou

== Sources ==
- Morez Jacobs, Adeline; Irish, Joel D.; Cooke, Ashley; Anastasiadou, Kyriaki; Barrington, Christopher; Gilardet, Alexandre; Kelly, Monica; Silva, Marina; Speidel, Leo; Tait, Frankie; Williams, Mia; Brucato, Nicolas; Ricaut, Francois-Xavier; Wilkinson, Caroline; Madgwick, Richard; Holt, Emily; Nederbragt, Alexandra J.; Inglis, Edward; Hajdinjak, Mateja; Skoglund, Pontus; Girdland-Flink, Linus (2 July 2025). "Whole-genome ancestry of an Old Kingdom Egyptian". Nature. 644 (8077): 714–721. Bibcode:2025Natur.644..714M. doi:10.1038/s41586-025-09195-5. ISSN 1476-4687. PMC 12367555. PMID 40604286.
- Simões, Luciana G.; Günther, Torsten; Martínez-Sánchez, Rafael M.; Vera-Rodríguez, Juan Carlos; Iriarte, Eneko; Rodríguez-Varela, Ricardo; Bokbot, Youssef; Valdiosera, Cristina; Jakobsson, Mattias (June 2023). "Northwest African Neolithic initiated by migrants from Iberia and Levant". Nature. 618 (7965): 550–556. Bibcode:2023Natur.618..550S. doi:10.1038/s41586-023-06166-6. ISSN 1476-4687. PMC 10266975. PMID 37286608.
