= Proto-Afroasiatic homeland =

Hypothetical linguistic homeland

The Afroasiatic languages, as they are distributed today

The Proto-Afroasiatic homeland is the hypothetical place where speakers of the Proto-Afroasiatic language lived in a single linguistic community, or complex of communities, before this original language dispersed geographically and divided into separate distinct languages. Afroasiatic languages are today mostly distributed in parts of Western Asia and North Africa.

The contemporary Afroasiatic languages are spoken in West Asia, North Africa, the Horn of Africa, parts of the Sahara and Sahel, and Malta in Europe. The various hypotheses for the Afroasiatic homeland are distributed throughout this territory; that is, it is generally assumed that Proto-Afroasiatic was spoken in some region where Afroasiatic languages are still spoken today, although this is not unanimous. However, there is disagreement as to which part of the contemporary Afroasiatic speaking areas corresponds with the original homeland. The majority of scholars today contend that Afroasiatic languages arose somewhere in Northeast Africa or Western Asia.

== Date of Proto-Afroasiatic ==
There is no consensus as to when Proto-Afroasiatic was spoken. The absolute latest date for when Proto-Afroasiatic could have been extant is c. 4000 BC, after which Egyptian and the Semitic languages are firmly attested. However, in all likelihood these languages began to diverge well before this hard boundary. The estimations offered by scholars as to when Proto-Afroasiatic was spoken vary widely, ranging from 18,000 BC to 8,000 BC. According to Igor M. Diakonoff (1988: 33n), Proto-Afroasiatic was spoken c. 10,000 BC. According to Christopher Ehret (2002: 35–36), Proto-Afroasiatic was spoken c. 11,000 BC at the latest, and possibly as early as c. 16,000 BC. These dates are older than dates associated with most other proto-languages. An estimate at the youngest end of this range still makes Afroasiatic the oldest proven language family. Contrasting proposals of an early emergence, Tom Güldemann has argued that less time may have been required for the divergence than is usually assumed, as it is possible for a language to rapidly restructure due to areal contact, with the evolution of Chadic (and likely also Omotic) serving as pertinent examples.

== Urheimat hypotheses ==
No consensus exists as to where Proto-Afroasiatic originated. Scholars have proposed locations for the Afroasiatic homeland across parts of Africa and western Asia. A complicating factor is the lack of agreement on the subgroupings of Afroasiatic (see Further subdivisions) – this makes associating archaeological evidence with the spread of Afroasiatic particularly difficult. Nevertheless, there is a long-accepted link between the speakers of Proto-Southern Cushitic languages and the East African Savanna Pastoral Neolithic (3000 BC), and archaeological evidence associates the Proto-Cushitic speakers with economic transformations in the Sahara dating c. 8,500 years ago, as well as the speakers of the Proto-Zenati variety of the Berber languages with an expansion across the Maghreb in the 5th century AD. More hypothetical links associate the proto-Afroasiatic-speakers with the Kebaran and the Mushabian culture, while others argue for a possible affiliation between proto-Afroasiatic and the Natufian culture.

The linguistic view on the location of the homeland of Afroasiatic languages is largely divided into proponents for a homeland within Northeast Africa, and proponents for a homeland in Western Asia. A homeland within Northeast Africa is favored by some scholars, while other scholars support a homeland in western Asia.

Pagani and Crevecoeur (2019) argue that, given the still open debate on the origin of Afroasiatic, the consensus will probably settle on an intermediate "across-the-Sinai" solution. They also note that the very early interactions between North African and Eurasian cultures, point "to a geographical shrinking of what can currently be defined as 'strictly African' in a long term perspective."

=== Western Asian homeland theory ===
==== Levant agriculturalists ====
Supporters of a western Asian origin for Afroasiatic are particularly common among those with a background in Semitic or Egyptological studies, and amongst archaeological proponents of the "farming/language dispersal hypothesis" according to which major language groups dispersed with early farming technology in the Neolithic, the birthplace of the Neolithic Revolution being in West Asia. The leading linguistic proponent of this idea in recent times is Alexander Militarev, who argues that Proto-Afroasiatic was spoken by early agriculturalists in the Levant, Mesopotamia and Anatolia and subsequently spread to North Africa and Horn of Africa. Militarev associates the speakers of Proto-Afroasiatic with the Levantine Post-Natufian Culture, arguing that the reconstructed lexicon of flora and fauna, as well as farming and pastoralist vocabulary indicates that Proto-AA must have been spoken in this area. Scholar Jared Diamond and archaeologist Peter Bellwood have taken up Militarev's arguments as part of their general argument that the spread of linguistic macrofamilies (such as Afroasiatic, Bantu, and Austroasiatic) can be associated with the development of agriculture; they argue that there is clear archaeological support for farming and associated tools and domesticated animals spreading from the Levant into Africa via the Nile valley.

Militarev, who linked proto-Afroasiatic to the Levantine Natufian culture, that preceded the spread of farming technology, believes the language family to be about 10,000 years old. He wrote (Militarev 2002, p. 135) that the "Proto-Afrasian language, on the verge of a split into daughter languages", meaning, in his scenario, into "Cushitic, Omotic, Egyptian, Semitic and Chadic-Berber", "should be roughly dated to the ninth millennium BC". Support for the migration of agricultural populations, according to linguists, are the word for dog (an Asian domesticate) reconstructed to Proto-Afroasiatic as well as words for bow and arrow, which according to some archaeologists spread rapidly across North Africa once they were introduced to North Africa from the Near East, viz. Ounan points.

Lexicon linked to a pastoralist society (cattle-breeding) reconstructed for proto-Afroasiatic also support a western Asian homeland, possibly indicating an earlier pastoralist migration.

=== Northeast African homeland theory ===
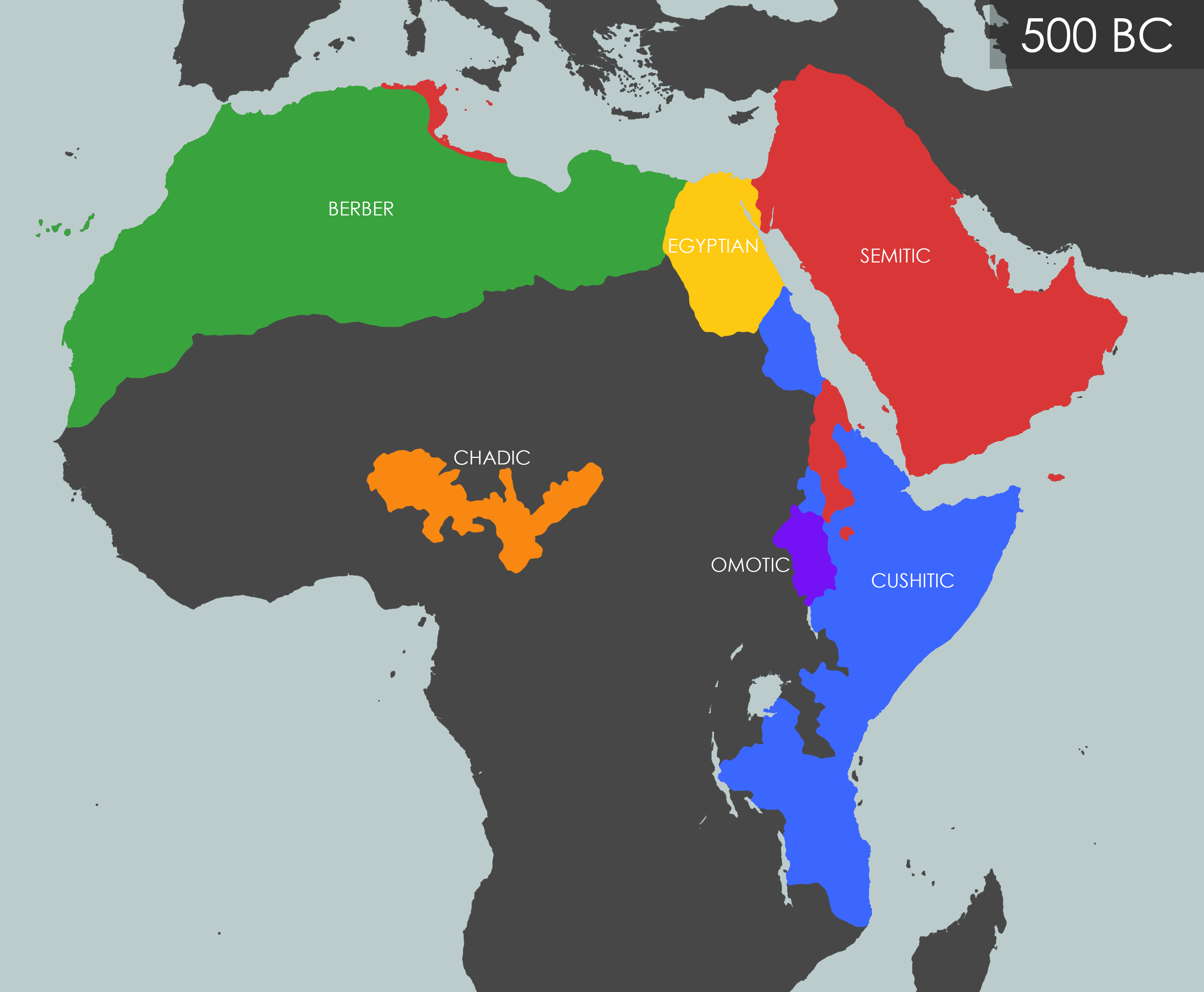
Possible reconstruction of Afroasiatic languages ca. 500 BC

A Northeast African homeland has been proposed by linguists as the origin of the language group largely because it includes the geographic center of its present distribution and the majority of the diversity observed among the Afroasiatic language family, sometimes considered a telltale sign for a linguistic geographic origin. Within this hypothesis there are a number of competing variants:

==== Red Sea coast ====
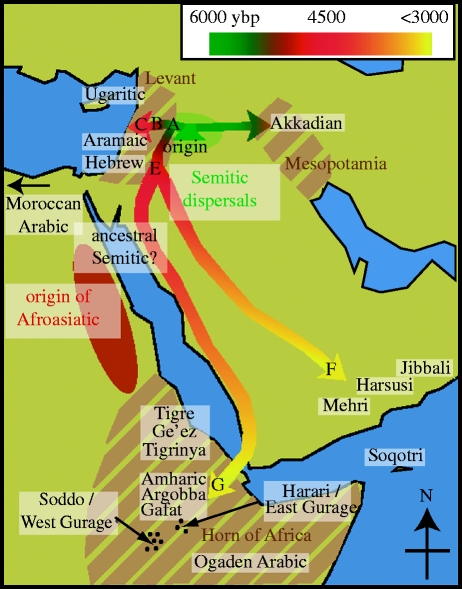
Proposed homeland of the Afroasiatic languages and subsequent migration of the Semitic branch into the Levant

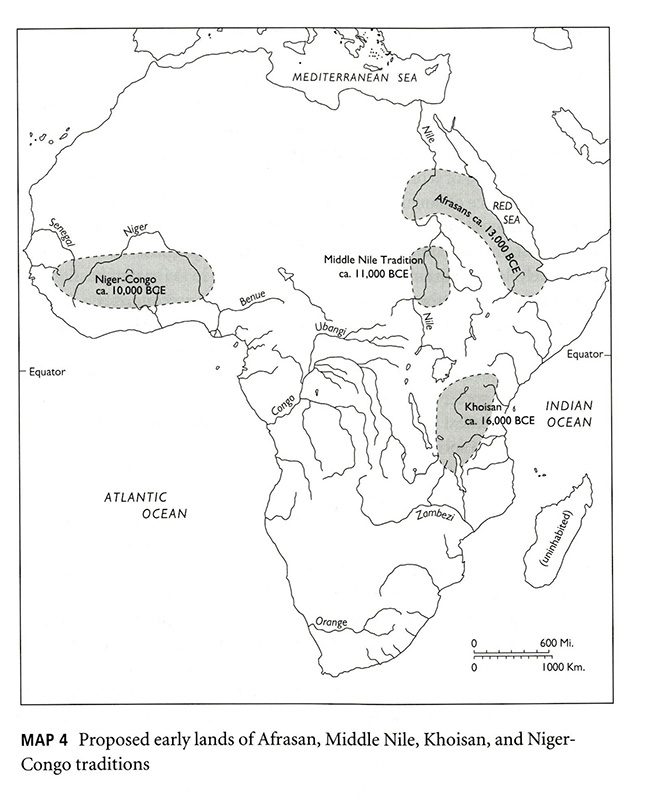
African languages and their place of origin according to Christopher Ehret; "Afrasan" is Ehret's preferred term for Afroasiatic.

Christopher Ehret has proposed the western Red Sea coast from Eritrea to southeastern Egypt. While Ehret disputes Militarev's proposal that Proto-Afroasiatic shows signs of a common farming lexicon, he suggests that early Afroasiatic languages were involved in the even earlier development of intensive food collection in the areas of Ethiopia and Sudan. In other words, he proposes an even older age for Afroasiatic than Militarev, at least 11,000 years old, and believes farming lexicon can only be reconstructed for branches of Afroasiatic. Ehret argues that Proto-Afroasiatic speakers in Northeast Africa developed subsistence patterns of intensive plant collection and pastoralism, giving the population an economic advantage which impelled the expansion of the Afroasiatic languages. He suggests that a Proto-Semitic or Proto-Semito-Berber-speaking population migrated from Northeast Africa to the Levant during the late Paleolithic.

In the next phase, unlike many other authors Ehret proposed an initial split between northern, southern and Omotic. The northern group includes Semitic, Egyptian and Berber (agreeing with others such as Diakonoff). He proposed that Chadic stems from Berber (some other authors group it with southern Afroasiatic languages such as Cushitic ones).

==== Ethiopia ====
Roger Blench has proposed a region in the adjacent Horn of Africa, specifically in modern day Ethiopia, arguing that Omotic represents the most basal branch and displays high diversity. Others have however pointed out that Omotic displays strong signs of contact with non-Afroasiatic languages, with some arguing that Omotic should be regarded as an independent language family. Like Ehret, Blench accepts that Omotic is part of the Afroasiatic grouping and sees the split of northern languages from Omotic as an important early development. Güldemann (2018) does not accept Omotic as unified group, but argues for at least four distinct groupings.

==== Sahel/Sahara ====
The Sahara highlighted in light orange and the Sahel highlighted in dark orange

Igor Diakonoff proposed the Eastern Saharan region, specifically the southern fringe of the Sahara as possible location of the Afroasiatic homeland. Lionel Bender proposed the area near Khartoum, Sudan, at the confluence of the Blue Nile and White Nile. The details of his theory are widely cited but controversial, as it involves the proposal that Semitic originated in Ethiopia and crossed to Asia directly from there over the Red Sea.

== Evidence from population genetics ==
=== Autosomal DNA ===
Scholars, such as Hodgson et al., present archaeogenetic evidence in favor for a place of dispersion within Africa, but argue that the speakers of Proto-Afroasiatic can ultimately be linked to a Paleolithic and pre-agricultural migration wave into Africa from Western Asia, and that the Semitic branch represents a later back-migration to the Levant.

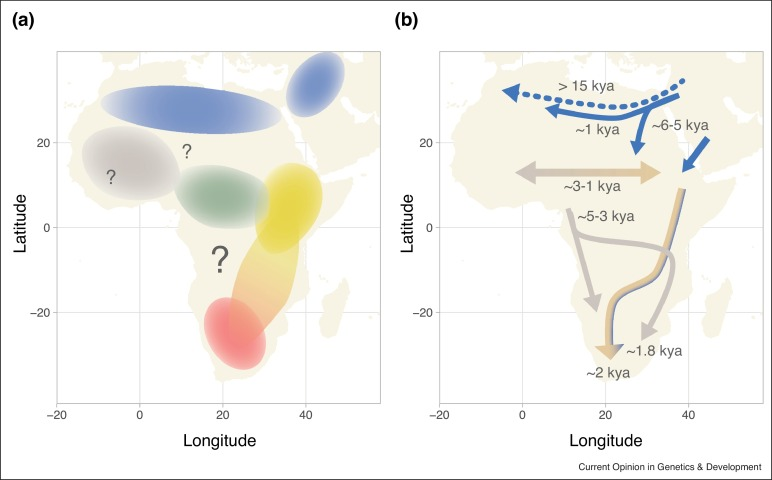
Pre-Neolithic and Neolithic migration events in Africa.

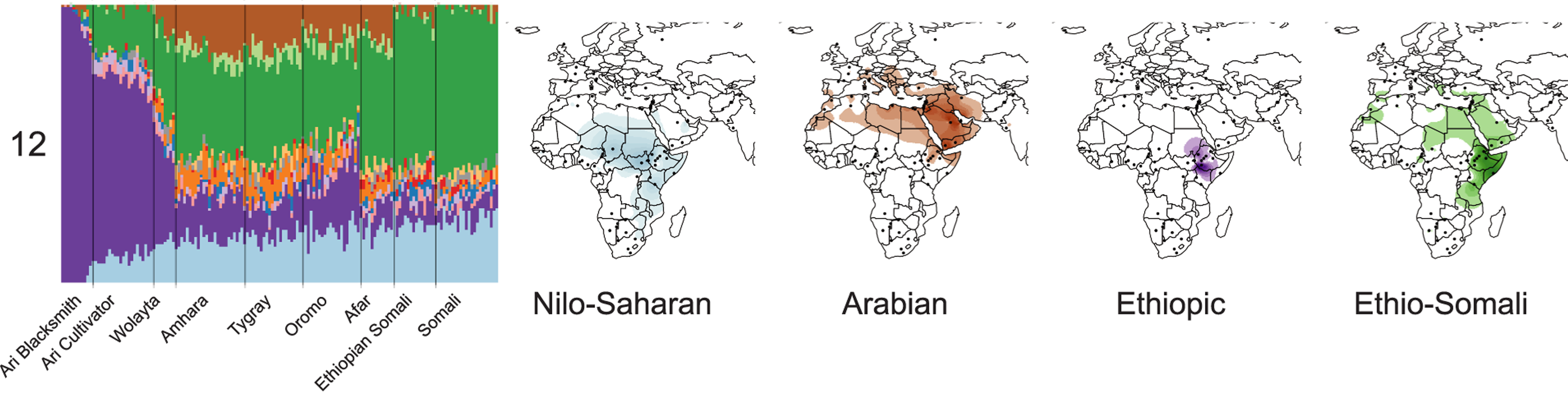
The "Ethio-Somali" genetic component labelled in green.

According to an autosomal DNA research in 2014 on ancient and modern populations, the Afroasiatic languages likely spread across Africa and the Near East by an ancestral population(s) carrying a newly identified "non-African" (Western Eurasian) genetic component, which the researchers dub the "Ethio-Somali" component. This genetic component is most closely related to the "Maghrebi" component and is believed to have diverged from other "non-African" (Western Eurasian) ancestries at least 23,000 years ago. The "Ethio-Somali" genetic component is prevalent among modern Afroasiatic-speaking populations, and found at its highest levels among Cushitic peoples in the Horn of Africa. On this basis, the researchers suggest that the original Ethio-Somali carrying population(s) probably arrived in the pre-agricultural period (12–23 ka) from the Near East, having crossed over into northeast Africa via the Sinai Peninsula and then split into two, with one branch continuing west across North Africa and the other heading south into the Horn of Africa. They suggest that a descendant population migrated back to the Levant prior to 4000 BC and developed the Semitic branch of Afroasiatic. Later migration from Arabia into the Horn of Africa beginning around 3 ka would explain the origin of the Ethio-Semitic languages at this time. A similar view has already been proposed earlier, suggesting that the ancestors of Afroasiatic speakers could have been a population originating in the Near East that migrated to Northeast Africa during the Late Palaeolithic with a subset later moving back to the Near East.

Subsequent archaeogenetic studies have corroborated the migrations of Western Eurasian ancestry during the Paleolithic into Africa, becoming the dominant component of Northern Africa since at least 15,000 BC. The "Maghrebi" component, which gave rise to the Iberomaurusian culture, is described as autochthonous to Northern Africa, related to the Paleolithic Eurasian migration wave, and the characteristic ancestry components of modern Northern Africans along a West-to-East cline, with Northeastern Africans having an additionally higher frequency of a Neolithic Western Asian component associated with the Neolithic expansion.

Genetic research on Afroasiatic-speaking populations revealed strong correlation between the distribution of Afroasiatic languages and the frequency of Northern African/Natufian/Arabian-like ancestry. In contrast, Omotic speakers display ancestry mostly distinct from other Afroasiatic-speakers, indicating language shift, or support for the exclusion of Omotic from the Afroasiatic group.

Genetic studies on a specimen of the Savanna Pastoral Neolithic excavated at the Luxmanda site in Tanzania, which has been associated with migrations of Cushitic-speaking peoples and the spread of pastoralism, found that the specimen carried a large proportion of ancestry related to the Pre-Pottery Neolithic culture of the Levant (Natufian), similar to that borne by modern Afroasiatic-speaking populations inhabiting the Horn of Africa. It is suggested that a population related to the Pre-Pottery Neolithic culture of the Levant contributed significantly to historical Eastern African populations represented by the c. 5,000 year old Luxmanda specimen, while modern Cushitic-speaking populations have additional contributions from Dinka-related and "Neolithic Iranian-related" sources. This type of ancestry was later partially replaced by following migration events associated with the Bantu expansion, with Bantu-speaking Eastern Africans having only little ancestry associated with the Pre-Pottery Neolithic culture of the Levant.

=== Y-chromosome evidence ===
Keita (2008) examined a published Y-chromosome dataset on Afro-Asiatic populations and found that a key lineage E-M35/E-M78, sub-clade of haplogroup E, was shared between the populations in the locale of Egyptian and Libyan speakers and modern Cushitic speakers from the Horn. These lineages are present in Egyptians, Berbers, Cushitic speakers from the Horn of Africa, and Semitic speakers in the Near-East. He noted that variants are also found in the Aegean and Balkans, but the origin of the M35 subclade was in Egypt or Libya, and its clades were dominant in a core portion of Afro-Asiatic speaking populations which included Cushitic, Egyptian and Berber groups, in contrast Semitic speakers showed a decline in frequency going west to east in the Levantine-Syria region. Keita identified high frequencies of M35 (>50%) among Omotic populations, but stated that this derived from a small, published sample of 12. Keita also wrote that the PN2 mutation was shared by M35 and M2 lineages and this paternal clade originated from East Africa. He concluded that "the genetic data give population profiles that clearly indicate males of African origin, as opposed to being of Asian or European descent" but acknowledged that the biodiversity does not indicate any specific set of skin colors or facial features as populations were subject to microevolutionary pressures.

Fregel summarized that the Y-chromosome diversity of North Africans was compatible with a demic expansion from the Middle East, because the age of common lineages in North Africa (E-M78 and J-304) were relatively recent. The North African pattern of Y-chromosome variation was mostly shaped during the Neolithic period.

Ehret cited genetic evidence which had identified the Horn of Africa as a source of a genetic marker "M35/215" Y-chromosome lineage for a significant population component which moved north from that region into Egypt and the Levant. Ehret argued that this genetic distribution paralleled the spread of the Afrasian language family with the movement of people from the Horn of Africa into Egypt and added a new demic component to the existing population of Egypt 17,000 years ago.

== See also ==
- Languages of Africa
- Afroasiatic languages
- Languages of Asia
- Proto-Afroasiatic language
- Proto-Indo-European homeland
- History of the Middle East
- Prehistoric North Africa
- Qadan culture

== Bibliography ==
- Barnett, William and John Hoopes (editors). 1995. The Emergence of Pottery. Washington, DC: Smithsonian Institution Press. ISBN 1-56098-517-8
- Bender, Marvin Lionel; Takács, Gábor; Appleyard, David L. (2003). Selected Comparative-historical Afrasian Linguistic Studies: In Memory of Igor M. Diakonoff. Lincom. ISBN 978-3-89586-857-3.
- Diakonoff, Igor M. (1996). "Some reflections on the Afrasian linguistic macrofamily". Journal of Near Eastern Studies. 55 (4): 293. doi:10.1086/373865. S2CID 162100534.
- Diakonoff, Igor M. (1998). "The earliest Semitic society: Linguistic data". Journal of Semitic Studies. 43 (2): 209. doi:10.1093/jss/43.2.209.
- Dimmendaal, Gerrit, and Erhard Voeltz. 2007. "Africa". In Christopher Moseley, ed., Encyclopedia of the world's endangered languages.
- Ehret, Christopher. 1997. Abstract Archived 2012-03-19 at the Wayback Machine of "The lessons of deep-time historical-comparative reconstruction in Afroasiatic: reflections on Reconstructing Proto-Afroasiatic: Vowels, Tone, Consonants, and Vocabulary (U.C. Press, 1995)", paper delivered at the Twenty-fifth Annual Meeting of the North American Conference on Afro-Asiatic Linguistics, held in Miami, Florida on March 21–23, 1997.
- Finnegan, Ruth H. 1970. "Afro-Asiatic languages West Africa". Oral Literature in Africa, p. 558.
- Fleming, Harold C. 2006. Ongota: A Decisive Language in African Prehistory. Wiesbaden: Otto Harrassowitz.
- Greenberg, Joseph H. (1950). "Studies in African linguistic classification: IV. Hamito-Semitic". Southwestern Journal of Anthropology. 6 (1): 47–63. doi:10.1086/soutjanth.6.1.3628690. JSTOR 3628690. S2CID 163617689.
- Greenberg, Joseph H. 1955. Studies in African Linguistic Classification. New Haven: Compass Publishing Company. (Photo-offset reprint of the SJA articles with minor corrections.)
- Greenberg, Joseph H. 1963. The Languages of Africa. Bloomington: Indiana University. (Heavily revised version of Greenberg 1955.)
- Greenberg, Joseph H. 1966. The Languages of Africa (2nd ed. with additions and corrections). Bloomington: Indiana University.
- Greenberg, Joseph H. 1981. "African linguistic classification." General History of Africa, Volume 1: Methodology and African Prehistory, edited by Joseph Ki-Zerbo, 292–308. Berkeley and Los Angeles: University of California Press.
- Greenberg, Joseph H. 2000–2002. Indo-European and Its Closest Relatives: The Eurasiatic Language Family, Volume 1: Grammar, Volume 2: Lexicon. Stanford: Stanford University Press.
- Hayward, R. J. 1995. "The challenge of Omotic: an inaugural lecture delivered on 17 February 1994". London: School of Oriental and African Studies, University of London.
- Heine, Bernd and Derek Nurse. 2000. African Languages, Chapter 4. Cambridge University Press.
- Hodge, Carleton T. (editor). 1971. Afroasiatic: A Survey. The Hague – Paris: Mouton.
- Hodge, Carleton T. 1991. "Indo-European and Afro-Asiatic." In Sydney M. Lamb and E. Douglas Mitchell (editors), Sprung from Some Common Source: Investigations into the Prehistory of Languages, Stanford, California: Stanford University Press, 141–165.
- Huehnergard, John. 2004. "Afro-Asiatic." In R.D. Woodard (editor), The Cambridge Encyclopedia of the World's Ancient Languages, Cambridge – New York, 2004, 138–159.
- Militarev, Alexander. "Towards the genetic affiliation of Ongota, a nearly-extinct language of Ethiopia," 60 pp. In Orientalia et Classica: Papers of the Institute of Oriental and Classical Studies, Issue 5. Moscow. (Forthcoming.)
- Newman, Paul. 1980. The Classification of Chadic within Afroasiatic. Leiden: Universitaire Pers Leiden.
- Ruhlen, Merritt. 1991. A Guide to the World's Languages. Stanford, California: Stanford University Press.
- Sands, Bonny (2009). "Africa's Linguistic Diversity". Language and Linguistics Compass. 3 (2): 559–580. doi:10.1111/j.1749-818x.2008.00124.x. S2CID 17658013.
- Theil, R. 2006. Is Omotic Afro-Asiatic? Archived 2021-02-24 at the Wayback Machine Proceedings from the David Dwyer retirement symposium, Michigan State University, East Lansing, 21 October 2006.
