= Haplogroup U =

Human mitochondrial DNA haplogroup

- Possible time of origin: 46,500 ± 3,300 years ago
- Possible place of origin: West Asia
- Ancestor: R
- Descendants: U1, U5, U6, U2'3'4'7'8'9
- Defining mutations: 11467, 12308, 12372

Haplogroup U is a human mitochondrial DNA haplogroup (mtDNA). The clade arose from haplogroup R, likely during the early Upper Paleolithic. Its various subclades (labelled U1–U9, diverging over the course of the Upper Paleolithic) are found widely distributed across Northern and Eastern Europe, Central, Western and South Asia, as well as North Africa, the Horn of Africa, and the Canary Islands.

== Origins ==
Haplogroup U descends from the haplogroup R mtDNA branch of the phylogenetic tree. The defining mutations (A11467G, A12308G, G12372A) are estimated to have arisen between 43,000 and 50,000 years ago, in the early Upper Paleolithic (around 46,530 ± 3,290 years before present, with a 95% confidence interval per Behar et al., 2012).

Ancient DNA classified as belonging to the U* mitochondrial haplogroup has been recovered from human skeletal remains found in Western Siberia, which have been dated to c. 45,000 years ago. The mitogenome (33-fold coverage) of the Peştera Muierii 1 individual (PM1) from Romania (35 ky cal BP) has been identified as the basal haplogroup U6* not previously found in any ancient or present-day humans.

Haplogroup U has been found among Iberomaurusian specimens dating from the Epipaleolithic at the Taforalt and Afalou prehistoric sites. Among the Taforalt individuals, around 13% of the observed haplotypes belonged to various U subclades, including U4a2b (1/24; 4%), U4c1 (1/24; 4%), and U6d3 (1/24; 4%). A further 41% of the analysed haplotypes could be assigned to either haplogroup U or haplogroup H. Among the Afalou individuals, 44% of the analysed haplotypes could be assigned to either haplogroup U or haplogroup H (3/9; 33%).

Haplogroup U has also been observed among ancient Egyptian mummies excavated at the Abusir el-Meleq archaeological site in Middle Egypt, dated to the 1st millennium BC, 13 of the 90 mummies bearing haplogroup U (U carriers all of the late period) and various subclades of it, U, U1, U3, U5, U6, U7 and U8. and in a separate study, DNA extracted from a tooth the mummified head of a much older mummy of about 4,000 years ago Djehutynakht of the very end of the 11th or early 12th Dynasty who belonged to mtDNA haplogroup U5b2b5 (with no exact matches found in a modern population of U5 carriers) from a 2018 article by Odile Loreille et al.

The first European lineage of haplogroup U in Iron Age Central China is represented by Chieftain Yu Hong (North China, 533–592 AD).

Additionally, haplogroup U has been observed in ancient Guanche fossils excavated in Gran Canaria and Tenerife on the Canary Islands, which have been radiocarbon-dated to between the 7th and 11th centuries CE. All of the clade-bearing individuals were inhumed at the Tenerife site, with these specimens found to belong to the U6b1a (4/7; 57%) and U6b (1/7; 14%) subclades.

== Distribution ==
Haplogroup U is found in 15% of Indian caste and 8% of Indian tribal populations. Haplogroup U is found in approximately 11% of native Europeans and is held as the oldest maternal haplogroup found in that region. In a 2013 study, all but one of the ancient modern human sequences from Europe belonged to maternal haplogroup U, thus confirming previous findings that haplogroup U was the dominant type of mitochondrial DNA (mtDNA) in Europe before the spread of agriculture into Europe from the Near East.

Haplogroup U has various subclades numbered U1 to U9. Haplogroup K is a subclade of U8. The old age has led to a wide distribution of the descendant subgroups across Western Eurasia, North Africa, and South Asia. Some subclades of haplogroup U have a more specific geographic range.

== Subclades ==
Subclades are labelled U1–U9; Haplogroup K is a subclade of U8.

Van Oven and Kayser (2009) proposed subclades "U2'3'4'7'8" and "U4'9". Behar et al. (2012) amended this by grouping "U4'9" as subordinate to "U2'3'4'7'8" for a new intermediate subclade "U2'3'4'7'8'9".

=== Haplogroup U ===
Basal U was found in the 26,000 years old remains of Ancient North Eurasian, Mal'ta boy (MA1).

=== Haplogroup U1 ===
The U1 subclades are: U1a (with deep-subclades U1a1, U1a1a, U1a1a1, U1a1b) and U1b.

Haplogroup U1 estimated to have arisen between 26,000 and 37,000 years ago. It is found at very low frequency throughout Europe. It is more often observed in eastern Europe, Anatolia and the Near East. It is also found at low frequencies in India. U1 is found in the Svanetia region of Georgia at 4.2%. Subclade U1a is found from India to Europe, but is extremely rare among the northern and Atlantic fringes of Europe including the British Isles and Scandinavia. In India, U1a has been found in the Kerala region. U1b has a similar spread but is rarer than U1a. A variety of subclade U1b1 with the mutations G14070A! and A3426G is found in Ashkenazi Jews. Subclades U1a and U1b appear in equal frequency in eastern Europe.

The rare U1 clade is also found among Algerians in Oran (0.83%-1.08%) and the Reguibat tribe of the Sahrawi (0.93%).

The U1a1a subclade has been observed in an ancient individual excavated at the Kellis 2 cemetery in the Dakleh Oasis, located in the southwestern desert of Egypt. 21 of the Kellis burials have been radiocarbon-dated to around 80-445 AD, a timeframe within the Romano-Christian period. Haplogroup U1 has also been found among specimens at the mainland cemetery in Kulubnarti, Sudan, which date from the Early Christian period (AD 550-800).

DNA analysis of excavated remains now located at ruins of the Church of St. Augustine in Goa, India have also revealed the unique mtDNA subclade U1b. This sublineage is absent in India, but present in Georgia and surrounding regions. Since the genetic analysis corroborates archaeological and literary evidence, it is believed that the excavated remains belong to Ketevan the Martyr, queen of Georgia.

- U1
  - U1a
    - U1a1
      - U1a1a
        - U1a1a1
          - U1a1a1a
        - U1a1a2
        - U1a1a-G16129A!
          - U1a1a3
      - U1a1b
      - U1a1c
        - U1a1c1
          - U1a1c1a
          - U1a1c1b
          - U1a1c1c
            - U1a1c1c1
          - U1a1c1d
            - U1a1c1d1
      - U1a1d
    - U1a2
    - U1a3
  - U1b
    - U1b1
    - U1b2
    - U1b3

=== Haplogroup U5 ===
The age of U5 is estimated at between 25,000 and 35,000 years old, roughly corresponding to the Gravettian culture. Approximately 11% of Europeans (10% of European-Americans) have some variant of haplogroup U5. The haplogroup most likely originated in Europe.

U5 was the predominant mtDNA of mesolithic Western Hunter Gatherers (WHG).

U5 has been found in human remains dating from the Mesolithic in England, Germany, Lithuania, Poland, Portugal, Russia, Sweden, France and Spain. Neolithic skeletons (~7,000 years old) that were excavated from the Avellaner cave in Catalonia, northeastern Spain included a specimen carrying haplogroup U5.

Haplogroup U5 and its subclades U5a and U5b today form the highest population concentrations in the far north, among Sami, Finns, and Estonians. However, it is spread widely at lower levels throughout Europe. This distribution, and the age of the haplogroup, indicate individuals belonging to this clade were part of the initial expansion tracking the retreat of ice sheets from Europe around 10,000 years ago.

The modern Basques and Cantabrians possess almost exclusively U5b lineages (U5b1f, U5b1c1, U5b2).

Additionally, haplogroup U5 is found in small frequencies and at much lower diversity in the Near East and parts of northern Africa (areas with sizable U6 concentrations), suggesting back-migration of people from Europe toward the south.

Mitochondrial haplogroup U5a has also been associated with HIV infected individuals displaying accelerated progression to AIDS and death.

U5 was the main haplogroup of Mesolithic European hunter gatherers. U haplogroups were present at 83% in European hunter gatherers before influx of Middle Eastern farmer and steppe Indo-European ancestry decreased its frequency to less than 21%.

- U5
  - U5a'b
    - U5a arose around 17,000 and 27,000 years ago
      - U5a1 arose between 14,000 and 20,000 years ago. Found in an Etruscan individual (700-600 B.C.) from southern Etruria, Italy.
        - U5a1-T16192C!
          - U5a1a arose between 8,000 and 16,000 years ago
            - U5a1a1 arose between 3,000 and 11,000 years ago
              - U5a1a1-T152C!
                - U5a1a1a arose less than 6,000 years ago
                - U5a1a1b arose around between 600 and 6,000 years ago
                - U5a1a1h
              - U5a1a1c
              - U5a1a1-T16362C
                - U5a1a1d arose less than 4,300 years ago
                  - U5a1a1d1
              - U5a1a1e
              - U5a1a1g
              - U5a1a1i
            - U5a1a2 arose between 7,000 and 14,000 years ago
              - U5a1a2a arose less than 5,400 years ago
                - U5a1a2a1 arose less than 3,400 years ago
                  - U5a1a2a1a
              - U5a1a2b
                - U5a1a2b1
          - U5a1g
            - U5a1g1
            - U5a1g2
              - U5a1b arose between 6,000 and 11,000 years ago
                - U5a1b1 arose between 5,000 and 9,000 years ago
                  - U5a1b1a arose between 2,500 and 7,500 years ago
                    - U5a1b1a1 arose less than 4,000 years ago
                    - U5a1b1a2
                    - U5a1b1a1
                  - U5a1b1b arose less than 8,000 years ago
                    - U5a1b1b1
                  - U5a1b1c arose between 3,000 and 7,000 years ago
                    - U5a1b1c1 arose less than 5,000 years ago
                    - U5a1b1c2 arose less than 5,000 years ago
                  - U5a1b1d
                    - U5a1b1d-T16093C
                      - U5a1b1d1
                  - U5a1b1e
                  - U5a1b1f
                  - U5a1b1g
                  - U5a1b1h
                - U5a1b2
                - U5a1b-T16362C
                  - U5a1b3
                    - U5a1b3a
                      - U5a1b3a1
                  - U5a1b4
        - U5a1c
          - U5a1c1
            - U5a1c1a
          - U5a1c2
            - U5a1c2a
              - U5a1c2a1
        - U5a1d arose around 19000 years ago
          - U5a1d1
          - U5a1d2
            - U5a1d2a
              - U5a1d2a1
            - U5a1d2b
        - U5a1e
        - U5a1f
          - U5a1f1
            - U5a1f1a
              - U5a1f1a1
          - U5a1f2
        - U5a1h
        - U5a1i
          - U5a1i1
        - U5a1j
      - U5a2 arose around 14000 years ago
        - U5a2-C16294T
          - U5a2a arose around 6000 years ago. It has been found in an ancient Mesolithic sample (6000-5000 cal BCE) from the Cave of Santimamiñe in the Basque Country, Spain.
            - U5a2a1
              - U5a2a1a
              - U5a2a1b
                - U5a2a1b1
              - U5a2a1c
              - U5a2a1d
              - U5a2a1-T152C!
                - U5a2a1e
            - U5a2a2
              - U5a2a2a
        - U5a2b arose around 8000 years ago. It has been found in a Proto-Villanovan female (930 BC and 839 BC) buried in Martinsicuro, Italy.
          - U5a2b1
            - U5a2b1a
            - U5a2b1b
            - U5a2b1c
            - U5a2b1d
          - U5a2b2
            - U5a2b2a
              - U5a2b2a1
          - U5a2b3
            - U5a2b3a
              - U5a2b3a1
          - U5a2b4
            - U5a2b4a
          - U5a2b5
        - U5a2c arose around 13000 years ago
          - U5a2c1
          - U5a2c2
          - U5a2c3
            - U5a2c3a
          - U5a2c4
        - U5a2d found at the Mesolithic Huseby Klev site in western Sweden
          - U5a2d1
            - U5a2d1a
        - U5a2-T16362C
          - U5a2e
    - U5b arose between 19,000 and 26,000 years ago and has polymorphisms in 150 7768 14182 ( + U5 polymorphisms). Found among Siwa Berbers of the Siwa Oasis.
      - U5b1 arose between 11,000 and 20,000 years ago. The Cheddar Man from Great Britain is a well known specimen.
        - U5b1a
        - U5b1-T16189C!
          - U5b1b has been found in Saami of Scandinavia, Finnish and the Berbers of North Africa, which were found to share an extremely young branch, aged merely ~9,000 years. U5b1b was also found in Fulbe and Papel people in Guinea-Bissau and Yakuts people of northeastern Siberia. It arose around 11000 years ago.
            - U5b1b1
              - U5b1b1-T16192C!
                - U5b1b1a
                  - U5b1b1a1
                    - U5b1b1a1a
                      - U5b1b1a1a1
                    - U5b1b1a1b
                  - U5b1b1a2
                  - U5b1b1a3
                - U5b1b1b A principal element in the maternal western eurasian lineages in Puerto Rico, matching with samples from Senegambia and northern Cameroon indicating its presence as a product of early colonization and enslavement of Senegambians.
                - U5b1b1-T152C!
                  - U5b1b1e
                - U5b1b1g
                  - U5b1b1g1
                    - U5b1b1g1a
            - U5b1b2
              - U5b1b2a
              - U5b1b2b
        - U5b1c arose about 13,000 years ago
          - U5b1c1
            - U5b1c1a
              - U5b1c1a1
          - U5b1c2
            - U5b1c2a
            - U5b1c2b
        - U5b1-T16189C!-T16192C!
          - U5b1e arose about 6600 years ago. U5b1e is mainly seen in central Europe among Czechs, Slovaks, Hungarians and southern Russians.
            - U5b1e1
              - U5b1e1a
          - U5b1h
        - U5b1d
          - U5b1d1
            - U5b1d1a
            - U5b1d1b
            - U5b1d1c
          - U5b1d2
        - U5b1f
          - U5b1f1
            - U5b1f1a
        - U5b1g
        - U5b1i
      - U5b2 arose between 17,000 and 23,000 years ago and has polymorphisms in 1721 13637( + U5b polymorphisms). The clade has been found in remains dating from prehistoric times in Europe, such as the subclade U5b2c1 of La Braña man (found at the La Braña site in Spain). U5b2 is rare among French Basques (2.5%) and more frequent in the Spanish Basques.
        - U5b2a between 12,000 and 19,000 years ago, prevalent in Central Europe.
          - U5b2a1 between 9,000 and 18,000 years ago
            - U5b2a1a
              - U5b2a1a-T16311C!
                - U5b2a1a1
                  - U5b2a1a1a
                  - U5b2a1a1b
                  - U5b2a1a1d
              - U5b2a1a2
            - U5b2a1b
          - U5b2a2 between 7,000 and 14,000 years ago
            - U5b2a2a
              - U5b2a2a1
              - U5b2a2a2
            - U5b2a2b
              - U5b2a2b1
            - U5b2a2c
          - U5b2a3 between 3,000 and 14,000 years ago
            - U5b2a3a
          - U5b2a-T16192C!
            - U5b2a4 between 1,000 and 10,000 years ago
              - U5b2a4a
            - U5b2a5 less than 2,600 years ago
              - U5b2a5a
            - U5b2a6 less than 12,000 years ago
        - U5b2b between 12,000 and 17,000 years ago. The clade was notably linked to Neve, who, at the time of her discovery, was the oldest identified female infant burial in Europe, carbon-dated to around 10,000 years ago.
          - U5b2b1
            - U5b2b1a
              - U5b2b1a1
              - U5b2b1a2
            - U5b2b1b
          - U5b2b2
          - U5b2b3
            - U5b2b3a
              - U5b2b3a1
                - U5b2b3a1a
            - U5b2b3b
          - U5b2b4
            - U5b2b4a
          - U5b2b5
        - U5b2c between 7,000 and 18,000 years ago.
          - U5b2c1 less than 8,000 years ago. Found in a Phoenician individual from a Carthage tomb in Byrsa, Tunisia.
          - U5b2c2 less than 3,000 years ago. Has the main relationship with the young phoenician man of Byrsa.
            - U5b2c2a
            - U5b2c2b
          - U5b2c3 less than 3,350 years ago. Has the main relationship with the young phoenician man of Byrsa. U5b2c3 is frequent in Aragon, Spain.
            - U5b2c3a less than 3,300 years ago.
      - U5b3 The subclade likely originates in the Italian peninsula; it is at its highest distribution in southwestern Europe, peaking amongst Sardinians (3.84%), followed by Balearic people (1.56%) and northern mainland Portuguese (1.09%). According to another study, U5b3 occurs at a frequency of 2.53% amongst Mallorcans and 0.96% amongst Sephardi Chuetas.
        - U5b3a
          - U5b3a1
            - U5b3a1a
            - U5b3a1b
          - U5b3a2
        - U5b3b this subclade is likely similarly western Mediterranean/Ibero-Italic in origin but spread to parts of northwestern and middle Europe through Roman expansion, with samples found in Crete (Greece), Spain, Central Italy, England, the German Palatinate, and Bohemia.
          - U5b3b1
          - U5b3b2
        - U5b3c
        - U5b3d
        - U5b3e
        - U5b3f
        - U5b3g
        - U5b3h

=== Haplogroup U6 ===
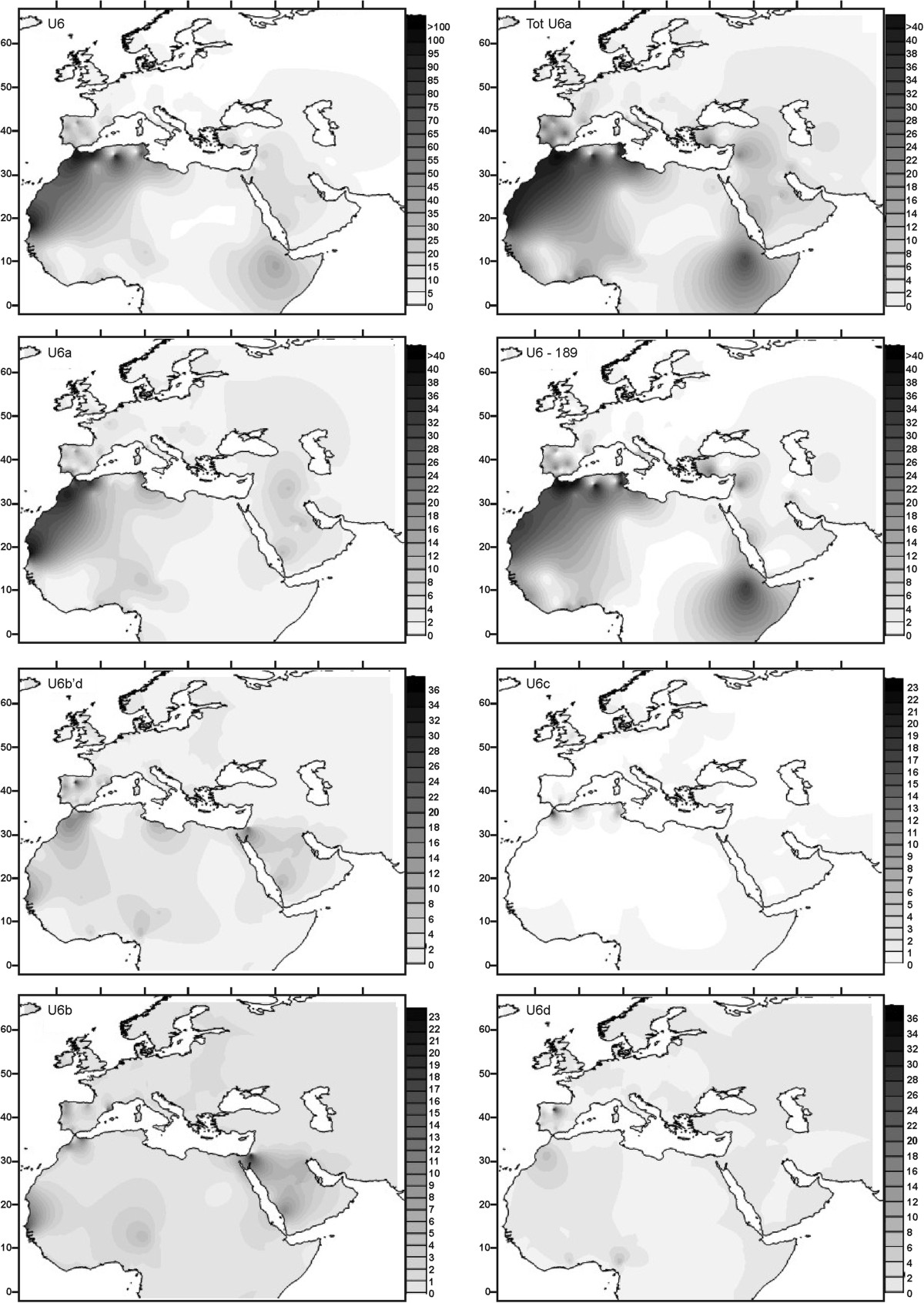
Projected frequencies for haplogroup U6 (top left) and several subclades.

Haplogroup U6 was dated to between 31,000 and 43,000 years ago by Behar et al. (2012). Basal U6* was found in a Romanian specimen of ancient DNA (Peștera Muierilor) dated to 35,000 years ago. Hervella et al. (2016) take this find as evidence for Paleolithic back-migration of Homo sapiens from Eurasia into Africa. The discovery of basal U6* in ancient DNA contributed to setting back the estimated age of U6 to around 46,000 years ago.

Usually U6 genetic history is envisioned as a migration from southwest Asia through North Africa. This hypothesis is based on the general origin of haplogroup U sub-clades in Southwest Asia, which is also the center of the geographical distribution of U sub-clades: Europe, India, Central Asia, East Africa and North Africa. Two possible scenarios for the first U6 haplotype (bearing mutations 3348 and 16172) can be advanced: i) these mutations aroused in the founder region but did not leave any genetic legacy in current human populations there; ii) they originated probably somewhere in North Africa, after the arrival of the U6 founder haplotype. Within North Africa U6 is only significantly frequent at its western edge (as well as in South-western Europe). More importantly, all the most basal branches are virtually restricted to that region (U6b, U6c and U6d), what could indicate its western origin. Nevertheless, it cannot be excluded the major sub-clade U6a, which shows a richness of sub-clades in Northwest Africa although a few of derivative branches also include sequences from East African and the Middle Eastern populations (e.g. U6a2).

Haplogroup U6 is common (with a prevalence of around 10%) in Northwest Africa (with a maximum of 29% in an Algerian Mozabites) and the Canary Islands (18% on average with a peak frequency of 50.1% in La Gomera). It is also found in the Iberian peninsula, where it has the highest diversity (10 out of 19 sublineages are only found in this region and not in Africa), Northeast Africa and occasionally in other locations. U6 is also found at low frequencies in the Chad Basin, including the rare Canarian branch. This suggests that the ancient U6 clade bearers may have inhabited or passed through the Chad Basin on their way westward toward the Canary Islands.

U6 is thought to have entered North Africa from the Near East around 30,000 years ago. It has been found among Iberomaurusian specimens dating from the Epipaleolithic at the Taforalt prehistoric site. In spite of the highest diversity of Iberian U6, Maca-Meyer argues for a Near East origin of this clade based on the highest diversity of subclade U6a in that region, where it would have arrived from West Asia, with the Iberian incidence primarily representing migration from the Maghreb and not persistence of a European root population.

According to Hernández et al. 2015 "the estimated entrance of the North African U6 lineages into Iberia at 10 ky correlates well with other L African clades, indicating that U6 and some L lineages moved together from Africa to Iberia in the Early Holocene."

U6 has two main subclades:

Subgroup U6a reflects the first African expansion from the Maghreb returning to the east. Derivative clade U6a1 signals a posterior movement from East Africa back to the Maghreb and the Near East. This migration coincides with the probable Afroasiatic linguistic expansion. U6b and U6c clades, restricted to West Africa, had more localized expansions. U6b probably reached the Iberian Peninsula during the Capsian diffusion in North Africa. Two autochthonous derivatives of these clades (U6b1 and U6c1) indicate the arrival of North African settlers to the Canarian Archipelago in prehistoric times, most probably due to the Saharan desiccation. The absence of these Canarian lineages nowadays in Africa suggests important demographic movements in the western area of this Continent.

— Maca-Meyer 2003

- U6a'b'd
  - U6a subclade is the most widespread, stretching from the Canary Islands and Iberian Peninsula to the Horn of Africa and Near East. The subhaplogroup has its highest diversity in Northeast Africa. Ancient DNA analysis of Iberomaurusian skeletal remains at the Taforalt site in Morocco, which have been dated to the Later Stone Age between 15,100 and 13,900 ybp, observed the U6a subclade among most of the fossils (6/7; ~86%). Fossils at the Early Neolithic site of Ifri n'Amr or Moussa in Morocco, which have been dated to around 5,000 BCE, have also been found to carry the U6a subhaplogroup. These ancient individuals bore an autochthonous Northwest African genomic component that peaks among modern Berbers, indicating that they were ancestral to populations in the area. U6a's estimated age is 24-27,500 BP. It has six major subclades:
    - U6a1 similar distribution to U6a parent clade; found particularly among Copts (27.6%) and Beja (10.4%). Estimated age: 15-20,000 BP.
      - U6a1a
        - U6a1a1
        - U6a1a2
      - U6a1b
        - U6a1b1
          - U6a1b1a
          - U6a1b1b
        - U6a1b2
        - U6a1b3
        - U6a1b4
    - U6a-T16189C!
      - U6a-T16189C!-x
        - U6a2
          - U6a2a
            - U6a2a1
            - U6a2a2
              - U6a2a2a
          - U6a2b
            - U6a2b1
          - U6a2-T195C!
            - U6a2c
        - U6a8
          - U6a8a
          - U6a8b
      - U6a3
        - U6a3a
          - U6a3a1
            - U6a3a1a
          - U6a3a2
            - U6a3a2a
        - U6a3-G185A
          - U6a3b
            - U6a3b1
          - U6a3e
          - U6a3f
            - U6a3f1
            - U6a3f2
        - U6a3c
        - U6a3d
          - U6a3d1
            - U6a3d1a
    - U6a4
    - U6a5
      - U6a5a
        - U6a5a1
      - U6a5b
      - U6a5c
    - U6a6
      - U6a6a
        - U6a6a1
      - U6a6b
        - U6a6b1
        - U6a6b2
    - U6a7
      - U6a7a
        - U6a7a1
          - U6a7a1a
          - U6a7a1b
          - U6a7a1-C152T!!
            - U6a7a1c
        - U6a7a2
          - U6a7a2a
      - U6a7b
        - U6a7b1
      - U6a7c
        - U6a7c1
  - U6a'b'd-T16311C!
    - U6b shows a more patched and western distribution. In the Iberian peninsula, U6b is more frequent in the north, whereas U6a is more common in the south. It has also been found at low frequencies in Morocco, Algeria, Senegal and Nigeria. Estimated age: 8,500-24,500 BP. It has one subclade:
      - U6b1 found only in the Canary Islands and in the Iberian peninsula. Estimated age: c. 6000 BP.
        - U6b1a
          - U6b1a1
        - U6b1b
      - U6b2
      - U6b3
        - U6b3a
    - U6d most closely related to U6b. Localized in the Maghreb, with a presence in Europe. It arose between 10,000 and 13,000 BP.
      - U6d1
        - U6d1a
        - U6d1b
      - U6d2
      - U6d3
        - U6d3a
- U6c only found in Morocco and Canary Islands. Estimated age: 6,000-17,500 BP.
  - U6c1
  - U6c2

U6a, U6b and U6d share a common basal mutation (16219) that is not present in U6c, whereas U6c has 11 unique mutations. U6b and U6d share a mutation (16311) not shared by U6a, which has three unique mutations.

=== U2'3'4'7'8'9 ===
Subclades U2, U3, U4, U7, U8 and U9 are now thought to be monophyletic, their common ancestor "U2'3'4'7'8'9" defined by mutation A1811G, arising between about 42,000 and 48,000 years ago (Behar et al., 2012). Within U2'3'4'7'8'9, U4 and U9 may be monophyletic, as "U4'9" (mutations T195C!, G499A, T5999C) arising between 31,000 and 43,000 years ago (Behar et al., 2012).

U2'3'4'7'8'9 was found in the remains of two 32,000 years old Ancient North Siberians (ANS) from the Yana RHS Site on river Yana.

==== Haplogroup U2 ====
Haplogroup U2 is most common in South Asia but is also found in low frequency in Central and West Asia, as well as in Europe as U2e (the European variety of U2 is named U2e). The overall frequency of U2 in South Asia is largely accounted for by the group U2i in India whereas haplogroup U2e, common in Europe, is rare; given that these lineages diverged approximately 50,000-years-ago, these data have been interpreted as indicating very low maternal-line gene-flow between South Asia and Europe throughout this period. Approximately one half of the U mtDNAs in India belong to the Indian-specific branches of haplogroup U2 (U2i: U2a, U2b and U2c). Haplogroup U2b2 has been found in the remains of a 4500 year old female excavated from the Rakhigarhi site of Indus Valley civilisation, in present day state of Haryana, India. While U2 is typically found in India, it is also present in the Nogais, descendants of various Mongolic and Turkic tribes, who formed the Nogai Horde. Both U2 and U4 are found in the Ket and Nganasan peoples, the indigenous inhabitants of the Yenisei River basin and the Taymyr Peninsula.

The U2 subclades are: U2a, U2b, U2c, U2d, and U2e. With the India-specific subclades U2a, U2b, and U2c collectively referred to as U2i, the Eurasian haplogroup U2d appears to be a sister clade with the Indian haplogroup U2c, while U2e is considered a European-specific subclade but also found in South India.

Haplogroup U2 has been found in the remains of a 37,000 and 30,000-year-old hunter-gatherer from the Kostyonki, Voronezh Oblast in Central-South European Russia., in 4800 to 4000-year-old human remains from a Beaker culture site of the Late Neolithic in Kromsdorf Germany, and in 2,000-year-old human remains from Bøgebjerggård in Southern Denmark. However, haplogroup U2 is rare in present-day Scandinavians. The remains of a 2,000-year-old West Eurasian male of haplogroup U2e1 was found in the Xiongnu Cemetery of Northeast Mongolia.

- U2
  - U2a
    - U2a1
      - U2a1a
      - U2a1b
    - U2a2
  - U2b
    - U2b1
      - U2b1a
    - U2b2
  - U2-T152C!
    - U2c'd
      - U2c
        - U2c1
          - U2c1a
          - U2c1b
      - U2d
        - U2d1
        - U2d2
          - U2d2a
        - U2d3
    - U2e
      - U2e1'2'3
        - U2e1
          - U2e1a
            - U2e1a1
              - U2e1a1a
              - U2e1a1b
              - U2e1a1c
          - U2e1b
            - U2e1b1
            - U2e1b2
          - U2e1c
            - U2e1c1
          - U2e1d
          - U2e1e
          - U2e1f
            - U2e1f1
          - U2e1g
          - U2e1h
        - U2e2
          - U2e2a
            - U2e2a1
              - U2e2a1a
                - U2e2a1a1
                - U2e2a1a2
              - U2e2a1b
              - U2e2a1c
              - U2e2a1d
        - U2e3
          - U2e3a
          - U2e3b

==== Haplogroup U3 ====
Haplogroup U3 falls into two subclades:: U3a and U3b.

Coalescence age for U3a is estimated as 18,000 to 26,000-years-ago while the coalescence age for U3b is estimated as 18,000 to 24,000-years-ago. U3a is found in Europe, the Near East, the Caucasus and North Africa. The almost-entirely European distributed subclade, U3a1, dated at 4000 to 7000-years-ago, suggests a relatively recent (late Holocene or later) expansion of these lineages in Europe. There is a minor U3c subclade (derived from U3a), represented by a single Azeri mtDNA from the Caucasus. U3b is widespread across the Middle East and the Caucasus, and it is found especially in Iran, Iraq and Yemen, with a minor European subclade, U3b1b, dated at 2000 to 3000-years-ago. Haplogroup U3 is defined by the HVR1 transition A16343G. It is found at low levels throughout Europe (about 1% of the population), the Near East (about 2.5% of the population), and Central Asia (about 1% of the population). U3 is present in the Svan population from the Svaneti region (about 4.2% of the population) and among Lithuanian Roma, Polish Roma, and Spanish Roma populations (36-56%)

The U3 clade is also found among Mozabite Berbers (10.59%), as well as Egyptians in the El-Hayez (2.9%) and Gurna oases (2.9%), and Algerians in Oran (1.08%-1.25%). The rare U3a subclade occurs among the Tuareg inhabiting Niger (3.23%) and among Somalis (1.6%).

Haplogroup U3 has been found in some of the 6400-year-old remains (U3a) discovered in the caves at Wadi El-Makkukh near Jericho associated with the Chalcolithic period. Haplogroup U3 was already present in the West Eurasian gene pool around 6,000-years-ago and probably also its subclade U3a as well.

- U3
  - U3a'c
    - U3a
      - U3a1
        - U3a1a
          - U3a1a1
        - U3a1b
        - U3a1c
          - U3a1c1
      - U3a2
        - U3a2a
          - U3a2a1
            - U3a2a1a
      - U3a3
    - U3c
  - U3b
    - U3b1
      - U3b1a
        - U3b1a1
      - U3b1b
    - U3b2
      - U3b2a
        - U3b2a1
          - U3b2a1a
      - U3b2b
      - U3b2c
    - U3b3

==== Haplogroup U4'9 ====
===== Haplogroup U4 =====
Haplogroup U4 has its origin between 21,000 and 14,000 years ago. Its distribution is associated with the population bottleneck due to the Last Glacial Maximum.

U4 has been found in ancient DNA, and it is relatively rare in modern populations, although it is found in substantial ratios in certain indigenous populations of Northern Asia and Northern Europe, being associated with the remnants of ancient European hunting-gatherers preserved in the indigenous populations of Siberia. U4 is found in the endangered Nganasan people of the Taymyr Peninsula, in the Mansi (16.3%), and in the Ket people (28.9%) of the Yenisei River. It is found in Europe with highest concentrations in Scandinavia and the Baltic states. and is found in the Sami population of the Scandinavian peninsula (although, U5b has a higher representation). U4 is also preserved in the Kalash people (current population size 3,700) a unique tribe among the Indo-Aryan peoples of Pakistan where U4 (subclade U4a1) attains its highest frequency of 34%.

The U4 subclades are: U4a, U4b, U4c, and U4d.

Haplogroup U4 is associated with ancient European hunter-gatherers and has been found in 7,200 to 6,000-year-old remains in Zealand, Denmark (late Kongemose culture or early Ertebølle culture) and in 4,200-year-old remains from a passage grave at Damsbo site (Jordløse Parish). Eight out of 19 remains from 4,800 to 4,000-year-old Pitted Ware burials in Swedish Gotland carried haplogroups H1b or U4, according to frequencies of HVS1 polymorphisms. Remains identified as subclade U4a2 are associated with the Corded Ware culture, which flourished 5200 to 4300 years ago in Eastern and Central Europe and encompassed most of continental northern Europe from the Volga River in the east to the Rhine in the west. Mitochondrial DNA recovered from 3,500 to 3,300-year-old remains at the Bredtoftegård site in Denmark associated with the Nordic Bronze Age include haplogroup U4 with 16179T in its HVR1 indicative of subclade U4c1. 2 out of 9 1700-year-old remains in the extreme southwest of Ivanovo Region were U4c1.

- U4
  - U4a
    - U4a1
      - U4a1a
        - U4a1a1
        - U4a1a2
        - U4a1a3
      - U4a1b
        - U4a1b1
          - U4a1b1a
        - U4a1b2
      - U4a1c
      - U4a1d
      - U4a1e
    - U4a2
      - U4a2a
        - U4a2a1
        - U4a2a2
        - U4a2a3
      - U4a2b
      - U4a2c
        - U4a2c1
      - U4a2d
      - U4a2e
      - U4a2f
      - U4a2g
      - U4a2h
        - U4a2h1
    - U4a3
      - U4a3a
  - U4b
    - U4b1
      - U4b1a
        - U4b1a1
          - U4b1a1a
            - U4b1a1a1
        - U4b1a2
          - U4b1a2a
          - U4b1a2b
        - U4b1a3
          - U4b1a3a
        - U4b1a4
      - U4b1-T146C!
        - U4b1b
          - U4b1b1
            - U4b1b1a
            - U4b1b1b
            - U4b1b1-T16311C!
              - U4b1b1c
            - U4b1b1d
          - U4b1b2
    - U4b2
      - U4b2a
        - U4b2a1
          - U4b2a1a
    - U4b3
  - U4c
    - U4c1
      - U4c1a
    - U4c2
      - U4c2a
  - U4d
    - U4d1
      - U4d1a
        - U4d1a1
          - U4d1a1a
      - U4d1b
    - U4d2
    - U4d3

===== Haplogroup U9 =====
Haplogroup U9 is a rare clade in mtDNA phylogeny, characterized only recently in a few populations of Pakistan (Quintana-Murci et al. 2004). Its presence in Ethiopia and Yemen, together with some Indian-specific M lineages in the Yemeni sample, points to gene flow along the coast of the Arabian Sea. Haplogroups U9 and U4 share two common mutations at the root of their phylogeny. It is interesting that, in Pakistan, U9 occurs frequently only among the so-called Makrani population. In this particular population, lineages specific to parts of Eastern Africa occur as frequently as 39%, which suggests that U9 lineages in Pakistan may have an African origin (Quintana-Murci et al. 2004). Regardless of which coast of the Arabian Sea may have been the origin of U9, its Ethiopian–southern Arabian–Indus Basin distribution hints that the subclade's diversification from U4 may have occurred in regions far away from the current area of the highest diversity and frequency of haplogroup U4—East Europe and western Siberia.

- U9
  - U9a
    - U9a1
  - U9b
    - U9b1

==== Haplogroup U7 ====
Haplogroup U7 is considered a West Eurasian–specific mtDNA haplogroup, believed to have originated in the Black Sea area approximately 30,000 years ago. In modern populations, U7 occurs at low frequency in the Caucasus, the western Siberian tribes, West Asia (about 4% in the Near East, while peaking with 10% in Iranians), South Asia (about 12% in Gujarat, the westernmost state of India, while for the whole of India its frequency stays around 2%, and 5% in Pakistan), and the Vedda people of Sri Lanka where it reaches it highest frequency of 13.33% (subclade U7a). One third of the West Eurasian-specific mtDNAs found in India are in haplogroups U7, R2 and W. It is speculated that large-scale immigration carried these mitochondrial haplogroups into India.

The U7 subclades are U7a (with deep-subclades U7a1, U7a2, U7a2a, U7a2b) and U7b.

Genetic analysis of individuals associated with the Late Hallstatt culture from Baden-Württemberg Germany considered to be examples of Iron Age "princely burials" included haplogroup U7. Haplogroup U7 was reported to have been found in 1200-year-old human remains (dating to around 834), in a woman believed to be from a royal clan who was buried with the Viking Oseberg Ship in Norway. Haplogroup U7 was found in 1000-year-old human remains (dating to around AD 1000-1250) in a Christian cemetery is Kongemarken Denmark. However, U7 is rare among present-day ethnic Scandinavians.

The U7a subclade is especially common among Saudis, constituting around 30% of maternal lineages in the Eastern Province.

- U7
  - U7a
    - U7a1
      - U7a1a
    - U7a2
      - U7a2a
    - U7a3
      - U7a3a
      - U7a3b
    - U7a4
      - U7a4a
        - U7a4a1
          - U7a4a1a
    - U7a5
  - U7b
    - U7b1
    - U7b2

==== Haplogroup U8 ====
Haplogroup U8a: The Basques have the most ancestral phylogeny in Europe for the mitochondrial haplogroup U8a. This is a rare subgroup of U8, placing the Basque origin of this lineage in the Upper Palaeolithic. The lack of U8a lineages in Africa suggests that their ancestors may have originated from West Asia.

Haplogroup U8b: This clade has been found in Italy and Jordan.

Haplogroup U8b'K: This clade may be synonymous with Haplogroup K and Haplogroup UK.

The haplogroup U8b's most common subclade is haplogroup K, which is estimated to date to between 30,000 and 22,000 years ago. Haplogroup K makes up a sizeable fraction of European and West Asian mtDNA lineages. It is now known it is actually a subclade of haplogroup U8b'K, and is believed to have first arisen in northeastern Italy. Haplogroup UK shows some evidence of being highly protective against AIDS progression.

- U8
  - U8a
    - U8a1
      - U8a1a
        - U8a1a1
          - U8a1a1a
            - U8a1a1a1
          - U8a1a1b
            - U8a1a1b1
        - U8a1a2
        - U8a1a3
        - U8a1a4
      - U8a1b
    - U8a2
  - U8b'c
    - U8b
      - U8b1
        - U8b1a
          - U8b1a1
          - U8b1a2
            - U8b1a2a
            - U8b1a2-T16311C!
              - U8b1a2b
        - U8b1b
          - U8b1b1
          - U8b1b2
      - K
    - U8c

== Famous members ==
- Dr. Sanjay Gupta carries haplogroup U2c.
- Political analyst Linda Chavez is a member of haplogroup U5a1a1.
- Genetic genealogist CeCe Moore belongs to haplogroup U5b1b2.

== See also ==
- Genealogical DNA test
- Genetic genealogy
- Human mitochondrial genetics
- Population genetics
- The Seven Daughters of Eve

Phylogenetic tree of human mitochondrial DNA (mtDNA) haplogroups

Mitochondrial Eve (L)

L0
L1–6

L1
L2

L3

L4
L5
L6
M
N

CZ
D
E
G
Q

O
A
S
R

I
W
X
Y
C
Z
B
F
R0

pre-JT

P

U
HV
JT
K
H
V
J
T
