= Ifri n'Ammar =

Neolithic archaeological site in Morocco

Ifri n'Ammar is an Aterian, Iberomaurusian, and Mediterranean Neolithic archaeological site in Morocco located on in the Oriental Rif commune of Afsou, about 50 km south of the city of Nador.

== See also ==
- Cardium pottery
- Iberomaurusian
- Ifri N'Amr Ou Moussa
- Kehf el Baroud
- Mechta-Afalou
- Taforalt
