= Haua Fteah =

Cave and archaeological site in Libya

- Location in Libya
- 32°53′59″N 22°03′05″E

Site notes
- Material: karst cave
- Elevation: 67 m (220 ft)
- Archaeologists: Charles McBurney, Graeme Barker

Haua Fteah (Arabic: هوا فطيح, romanized: Hawā Fṭiyaḥ) is a large karstic cave located in the Cyrenaica in northeastern Libya. This site has been of significance to research on African archaeological history and anatomically modern human prehistory because it was occupied during the Middle and Upper Paleolithic, the Mesolithic and the Neolithic. Evidence of modern human presence in the cave date back to 200,000 BP.

The term 'haua' describes a typical cave structure of the local coastal area, which has been formed in its present shape by erosion processes of the sea during the early stage of the Pleistocene.

== Location and environment ==
Haua Fteah is 1 kilometre (0.62 mi) from the coast and found near the northern side of the plateau at the base of the Jebel Akhdar (or Green Mountain). The entrance faces north towards the Mediterranean sea.

== Stratigraphy and layout ==
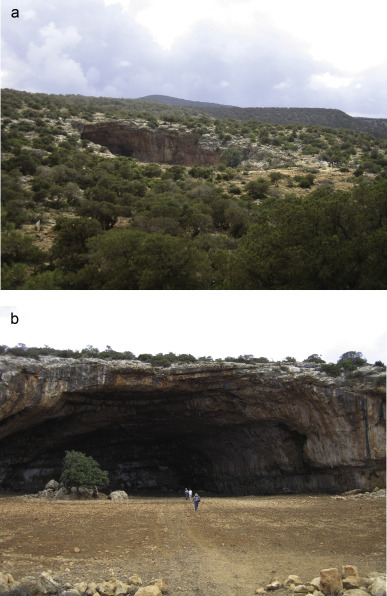
Haua Fteah cave

Haua Fteah is 50 metres (160 ft) high by 20 metres (66 ft) wide on the north entrance with an 80 metres (260 ft) span on the interior roofed portion of the cave. The horizontal stratigraphic layers are defined by the types of sediment contained in each layer and is supported by using radiocarbon dating techniques.

The geological time scale at Haua Fteah shows major climatic changes that occurred during the Pleistocene. During the final stage of the Riss-Wurm interglacial period the shoreline was six meters above the present sea level. The second major stage is that in which the sea level was twenty meters below current sea level.

== Discovered and research ==
Haua Fteah was first discovered in 1948 by Charles McBurney. McBurney and his team excavated the site from 1950 to 1955. Excavations were not done after 1955 until the most recent excavation in 2007. Since McBurney's excavations, there had been much erosion in this cave and heavy sedimentary layers had deposited over the original site as well.

A recent project called the Cyrenaica Prehistory Project (CPP), run by Graeme Barker of Cambridge, began in 2007. The goal of this program is to expand knowledge and understanding of the cave's sequence of use and the history of environmental changes and how humans had adapted to those changes. The CPP attempts to reconstruct the history of climate, environment, and human activity at Haua Fteah. The project plans on gaining insight to these areas through geomorphological, palaeoecological, and archaeological studies inside the cave and from the surrounding landscape. A few questions that the CPP aims to answer include, "When did anatomically modern humans first arrive on Africa's northern shores? How did they and earlier populations deal with the effects of profound and often abrupt climatic change? Was `behavioral modernity' critical to their successful colonization of North Africa? When, how, and why did farming develop in the Holocene?" as outlined by Cambridge University.

From 2007 through 2013 there has been 7 completed excavation seasons by the CPP.

== Account of excavations ==
The investigation of this site was started in 1951 in a sounding trench on the western side of the cave, which was 10 x 10 x 2 meters deep. In 1952, the second sounding trench was excavated horizontally atop the first trench that was 7 x 6 x 5.5 meters deep. Finally a deep sounding trench that was 3.8 X1.6 X 6.5 meters deep was excavated which gave the total excavation depth to be 14 meters deep.

The CPP extended these findings by recovering more tools similar to those mentioned by McBurney.

== Finds, artifacts and remains ==
There are seven distinct cultural phases determined by McBurney from these excavated layers. Cultural remnants of this site in the uppermost layer include hearths with shallow depressions that were most likely used for cooking fires and midden deposits.

The original carbon dates from McBurney's excavation were obtained from samples of wood charcoal and bone fragments. Many original samples from McBurney's excavation and material from the most recent excavations were evaluated and confirmed by using several recent dating techniques during the CPP. The first and earliest phase had the flake and blade artifacts which date back to 80 to 65,000 years ago (80-65 kya). The second phase from 19 to 28 feet deep contained the Levalloiso-Mousterian flints dated from 65 to 40 kya with current dating techniques suggest these finds are closely dated from 73 to 43 kya. At the depth of 23 feet a modern human mandible was discovered which date between 73 and 65 kya. Abundant evidence of the Levalloiso-Mousterian blade industry is found during the second stage of climatic change shows that there is no established tradition in blade making among these people during this time. There were small hearths, food and bone accumulations also found in this phase.

The fragment from the human mandible was found in August 1952. The fragments recovered were the left ascending ramus and a part of the condylar process with the second and third molars attached. The wisdom tooth had emerged but was not exposed for long, indicating that this specimen was in young adulthood, suggested from eighteen to twenty-five, at death. The middle of the bone is well intact but the lateral portion is partially destroyed. From the technical measurements of this fragment, it was thought that this specimen is closely linked to Neanderthals but more recent research, as determined the mandible fragments, are from a fully modern human or Homo sapiens.

Phase three, layers from 18 to 9 feet down contained 'Dabban' blades that are 40 to 15 kya. A Dabban is an early type of blade industry called a blade-and-burin industry. This type of blade is thought to be the oldest blade of the Upper Paleolithic and is only found in Haua Fteah and another nearby site. The origins of the Dabban is still unknown completely.

In phase 4, the 8 to 7 feet layers, a midden exists that mainly contains mammal bones and teeth, large amounts of limpet and cockle shells and land snails. This phase was also characterized by Later Stone Age microlithic tools dated to 14 to 10 kya.

Mesolithic microlithic tools that are between 10 and 7 kya were mainly found in phase five (7 to 6 feet down) and there was presence of ceramics.

Phase six (from 5 to 4 feet down) contained Neolithic pottery fragments and domesticated animal bones dated between 7 and 4.7 thousand years old. Flint fragments are found as well as finished tools, flake-scrapers, arrow-heads, a bifacial knife, trihedral pressure-flaked rods and drill heads. The presence of decorated ostrich eggs and pierced sea shells are also common in this phase. The piercing of these shells are thought to be for reasons of consumption and were carried out by small bladed tools.

The seventh and most recent phase, from 4 to 0 feet down contained structures dating back to the Roman era and animal keeping was indicated. Hearths can be identified and some pottery fragments of local and Roman origin were found.

== Discussion and implications ==
North African prehistory is often a subject of common debate in several areas including modern human dispersal, their adaptations to climate changes and agricultural developments. Haua Fteah lends tremendous information to such debates because of its continuous and long term occupation by humans. Although there were some excavations started by McBurney and now continued by the CPP, there are still many more excavations needed to clarify and support the current findings.
