= Mushabian culture =

Epipalaeolithic archaeological culture of the southern Levant

Mushabian
- Mushabian culture (Near East)
- Geographical range: Levant
- Period: Epipaleolithic
- Dates: c. 14,000 – c. 12,500 BP
- Type site: Wadi Mushabi
- Preceded by: Kebaran
- Followed by: Natufian culture

The Mushabian culture (alternately, Mushabi or Mushabaean) is an archaeological culture based in the Levant. Opinions vary regarding its origins; some archeologists argue that it originated among the Iberomaurusians in North Africa, while others contend it developed locally.

== Historical context ==
The culture is named after Wadi Mushabi and probably derives from the Nizzanim culture of the Negev.

According to Bar-Yosef and Emmanuel Anati, the Natufian culture had arisen as a result of the mixing of the local Kebarian culture of the Levant with the Mushabi culture.

== Archaeologists' opinions ==
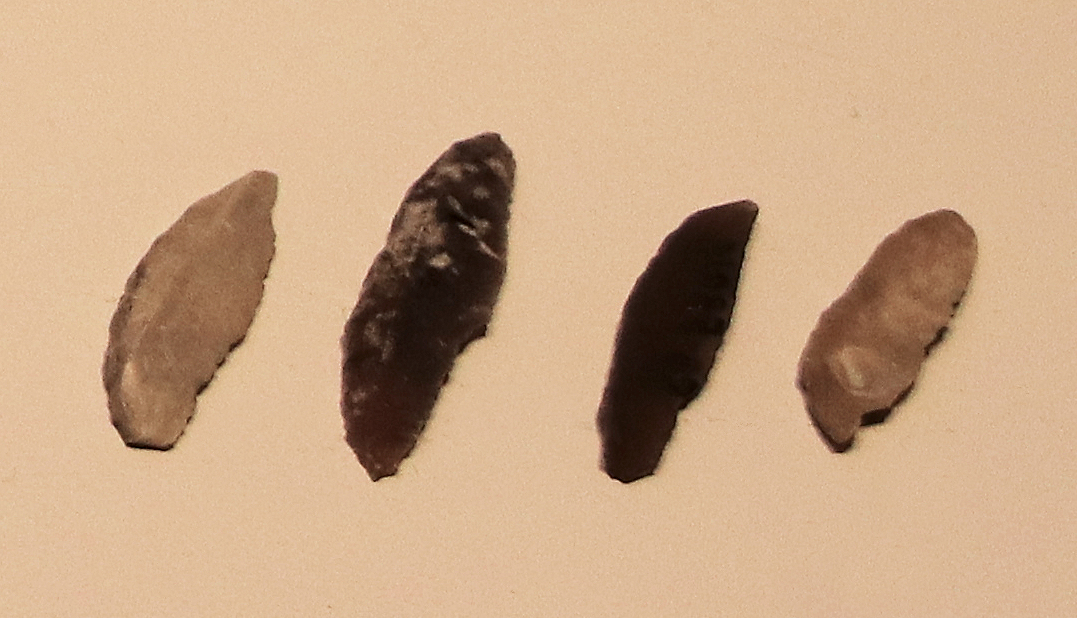
Mushabian culture microliths, Ramat Matred, circa 15500 BP

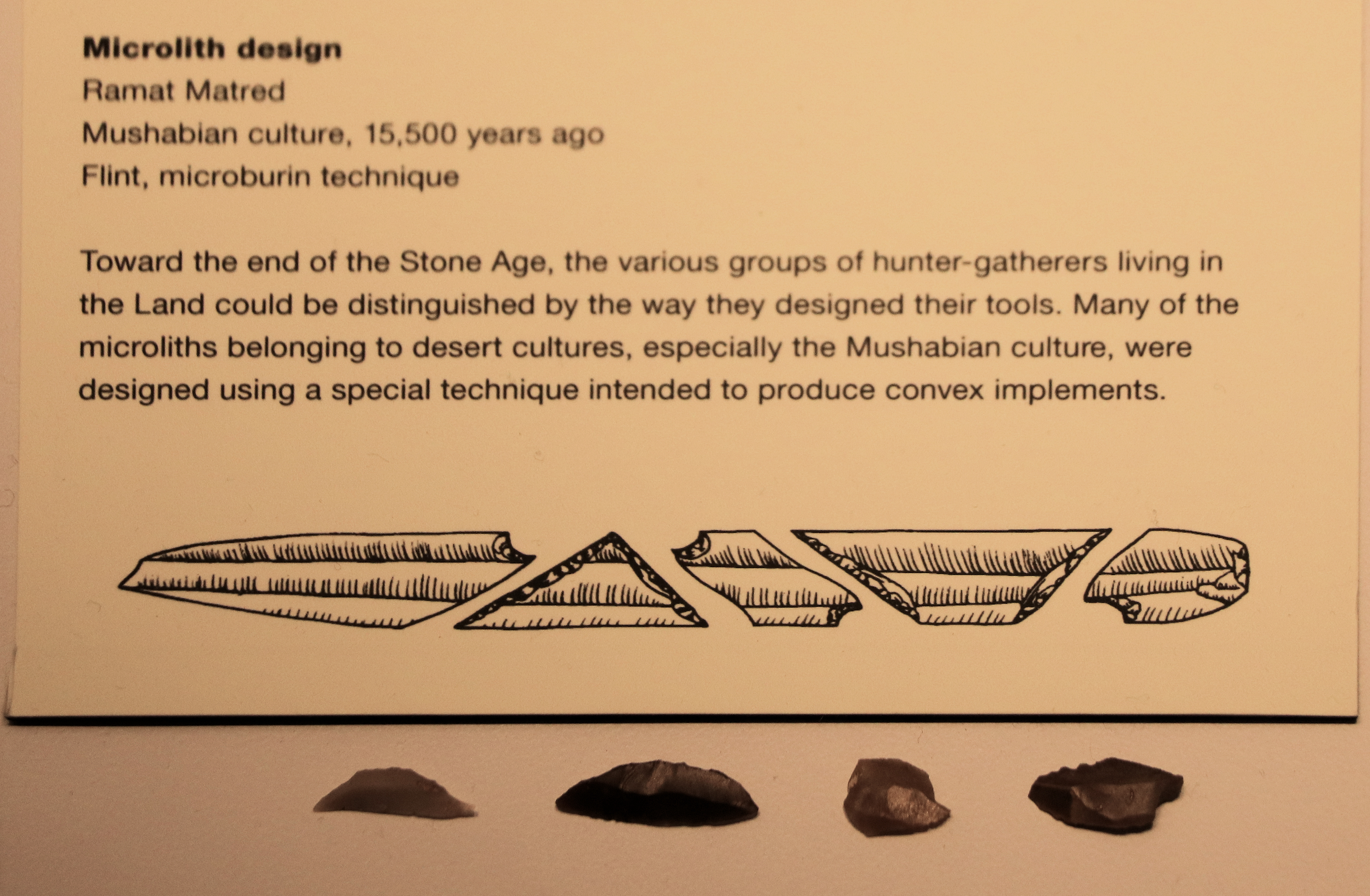
Flint Microliths, Mushabian culture, Israel Museum

According to Ofer Bar-Yosef :

"A contemporary desertic entity was labeled "Mushabian," and was considered to be, on the basis of the technotypological features of its lithics, of North African origin. The fieldwork done in recent years in northern Sinai and the Negev has shown that the forms of the Mushabian microliths (mainly curved and arched backed bladelets) and the intensive use of the microburin technique was a trait foreign to previous Levantine industries, but instead is closer to the Iberomaurusian."

According to Thomas Levy:

"The Mushabian is commonly considered to have originated in North Africa, largely on the basis of habitual of the microburin technique and general morphological similarities with some assemblages in Nubia (Phillips and Mintz 1977; Bar-Yosef and Vogel 1987.)"

According to Eric Delson:

"A different industry, the Mushabian, is marked by steeply arched microliths and the frequent use of the microburin technique. The Mushabian is found exclusively in the arid interior southern Levant (e.g., Sinai), suggesting it could represent an arid-land adaptation. Some researchers have noted stylistic continuities between the Mushabian and the Ibero-Maurusian of North Africa, suggesting the Mushabian may represent a migration of African groups into the southern Levant."

According to Deborah Olszewski:

"At the time that Henry and Garrard analyzed and published the Tor Hamar assemblage, it was commonly believed that microburin technique appeared relatively late in the Levantine Epipaleolithic sequence, perhaps being derived from microburin technique in Egypt. Since then, however, several Jordanian sites have produced evidence of microburin technique well in advance of the latter part of the Epipaleolithic sequence. These include Wadi Uwaynid 18 and Wadi Uwaynid 14 in the Azraq region of Jordan, with radiocarbon dates between 19 800 and 18 400 uncal. BP, Tor at-Tareeq in the Wadi al-Hasa area of Jordan, with radiocarbon dates between 16 900 and 15 580 uncal. BP, and Tor Sageer, also in the Wadi al-Hasa area, with radiocarbon dates between 22 590 and 20 330 BP. This new evidence clearly documents the use of the microburin technique in the inland Levant during the earliest phases of the Epipaleolithic. Thus, its presence at sites such as Wadi Madamagh and Tor Hamar cannot necessarily be used to link these sites to the Mushabian Complex, a fact also noted by Byrd".

According to Nigel Goring-Morris:

"Another technological shift is reflected in the approach to microlith fabrication, when backed microliths replaced finely retouched types, sometimes using the microburin technique. The introduction and systematic use of this technique in the Levant (i.e., Nebekian, Nizzanan, and later the Mushabian, Ramonian, and Natufian) are an endemic phenomenon, originating east of the Rift Valley".
