= Capsa (disambiguation) =

Capsa may refer to:

- Capsa (Roman colonia), an ancient Roman city
  - Gafsa, the modern city in Tunisia
- Capsa (software), a network protocol analyzer (packet sniffer) for Windows
- Capsa (see), a Roman Catholic titular see.
- Cap Sa/Capsa, another name for the card game Big Two
- Casa Capșa, a restaurant and hotel in Bucharest, Romania

== See also ==
- Capsule
- Capsian
