= Roman baths of Gafsa =

Structure in central Tunisia

Coordinates: 34°24′56″N 8°47′13″E

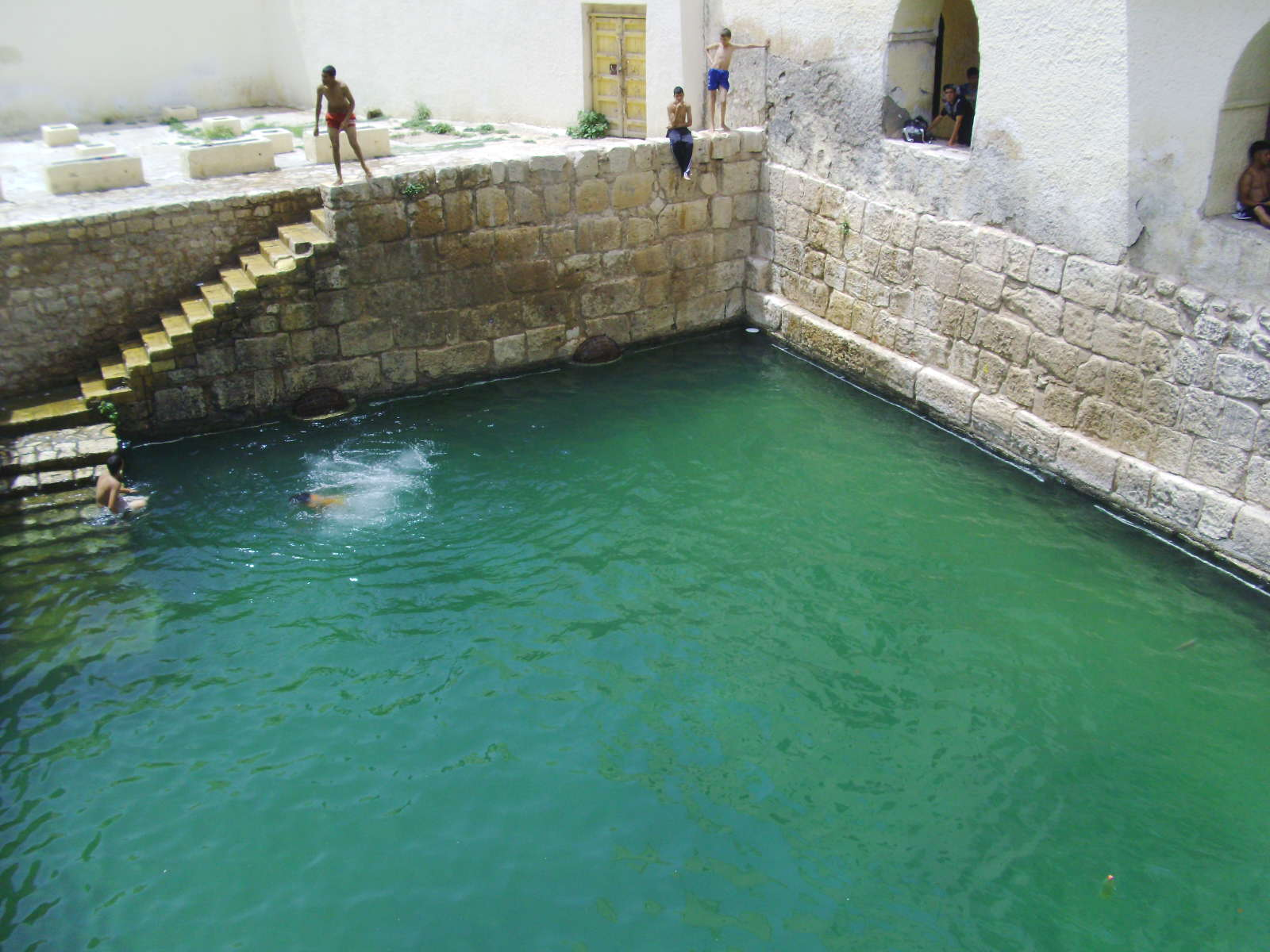
Roman pool in Gafsa

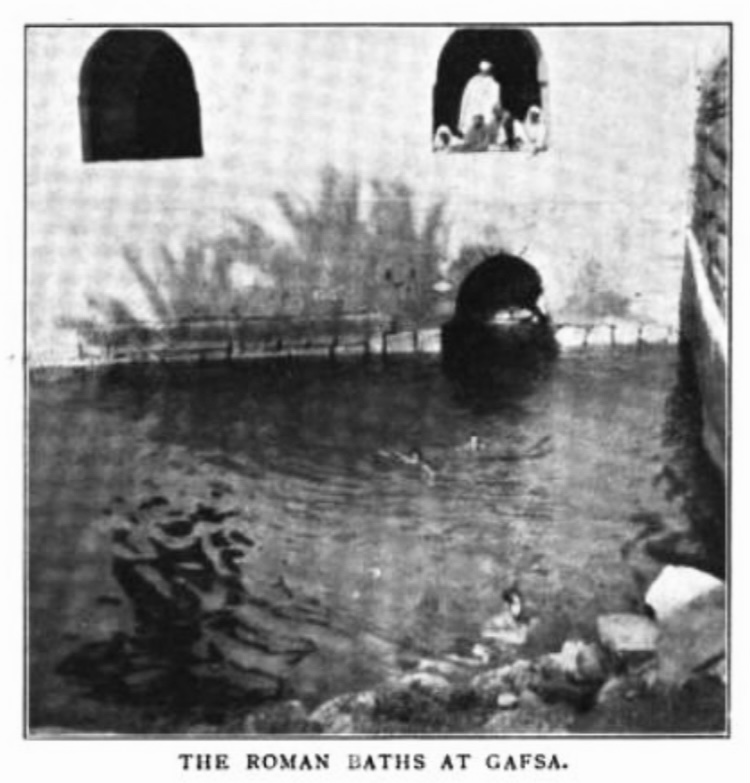
Roman baths at Gafsa Tunisia photographed 1905

The Roman baths of Gafsa (French: Piscines Romaines) are well-preserved remnants of the Limes Tripolitanus era of North African history, when Gafsa, Tunisia was called Capsa. According to a history of water in the Roman world, "there are two open-air central pools" in part because it was a Trajanic colony. The baths and the nearby Gafsa Oases were both established because of a local spring that emerges from the nearby mountains. Sallust mentioned the oasis/settlement existing circa 100 BC. A "Byzantine fortress" also remains.

The American 16th Infantry Regiment used the baths for a respite during the North African campaign of World War II.

== See also ==
- Aïn Doura Baths
- Licinian Baths
- List of Roman public baths
- List of Byzantine forts and other structures in the Maghreb
- Capsa
