= Ain-Djoukar =

Tunisia Map.

Ain-Djoukar also known as Jougar (Arabic: جوقار spelled when available with a special local character ڤ accounting for its [g] pronunciation) is a locality in Tunisia, located at 36° 14' 50" N, 9° 56' 24" E. It is 371 meters above sea level and at the head waters of the Oued Miliane wadi. The springs at this location near the Djebel Bargou mountains was recognised by the Romans as an important water source and a Roman aqueduct was constructed to Carthage.

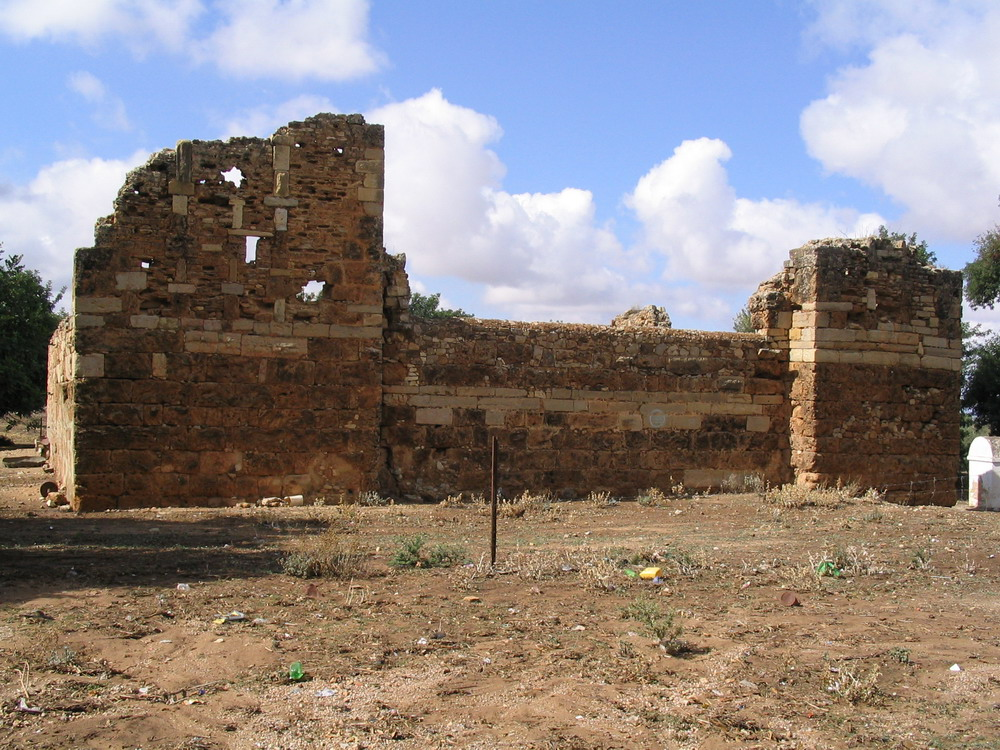
ruins at Ain-Djoukar.

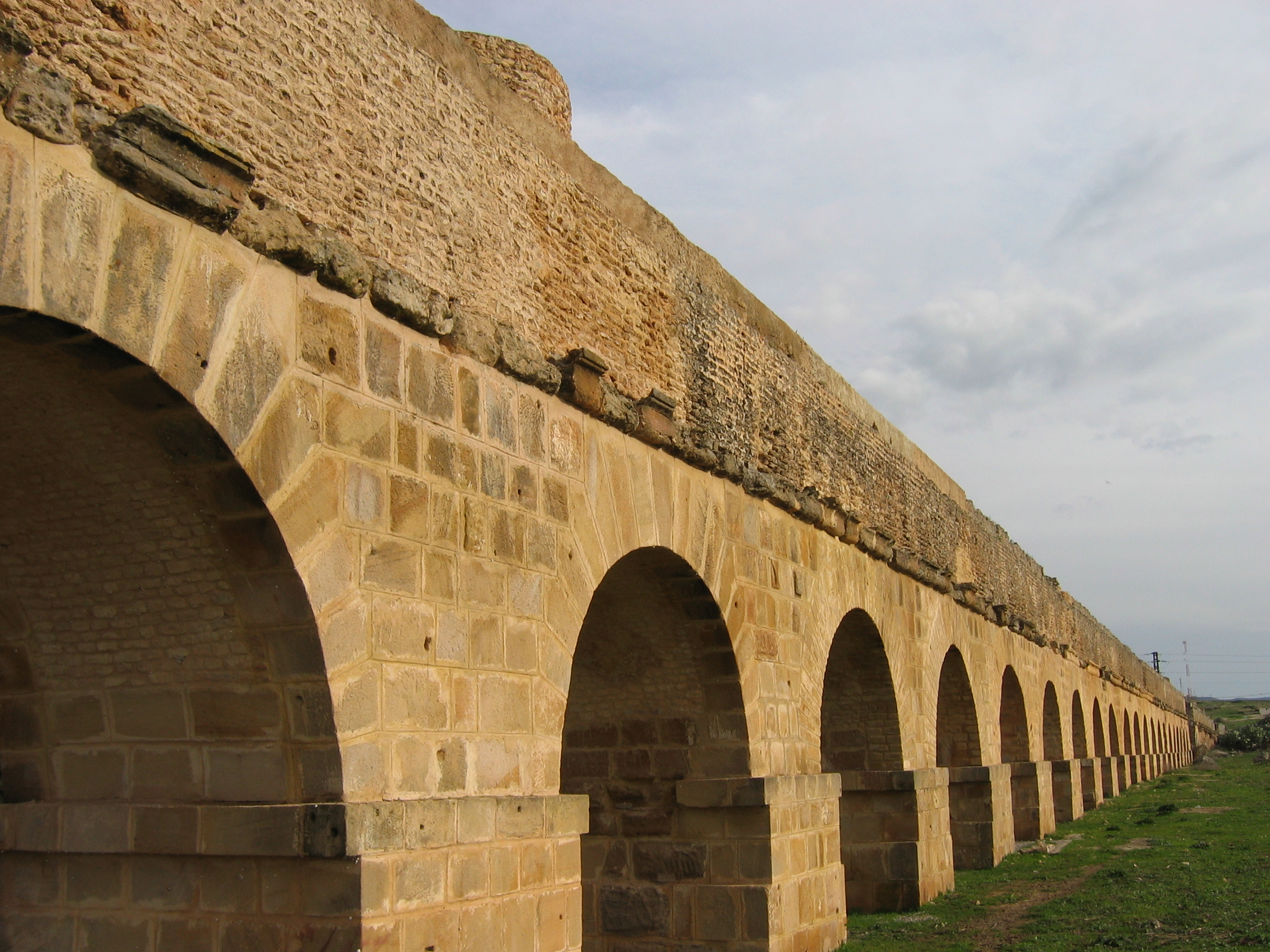
Zaghouan aqueduct

Remains of the aqueduct of Zaghouan can be seen today.

== See also ==
- Zaghouan Aqueduct
