= Capsa (Roman colonia) =

Gafsa, Tunisia historic era

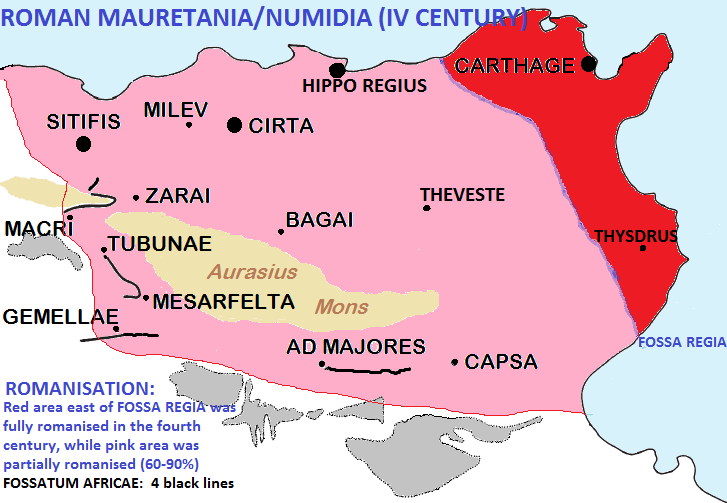
Capsa was near the Fossatum Africae, that marked the border between the Roman controlled Africa and the barbarian tribes. In the red areas there was a full Latinisation, while in the pink it was only partial

Capsa was a Roman colonia located in the south of modern-day Tunisia. Before Roman times Capsa was a center of the Capsian culture.

The Roman colonia was very important under the Roman emperors and reached 100,000 inhabitants at the end of the second century. Under the Byzantines the city was for some years the capital of the Byzantine province "Byzacena" and enjoyed a period of economic revival. General Solomon build in 540 AD a new city wall and named the city "Capsa-Justiniana".

After Roman centuries it was a center of the last Christian and romance speaking people in North Africa. The corresponding modern city is Gafsa.

== History ==
The modern city of Gafsa was called Capsa when was part of Roman Africa and was an important city near the Fossatum Africae.

The Roman city was conquered by the Vandals, but soon was independent: Capsa was the capital of a Romano-berber kingdom (called Kingdom of Capsus) in the sixth century until the Arab invasion.

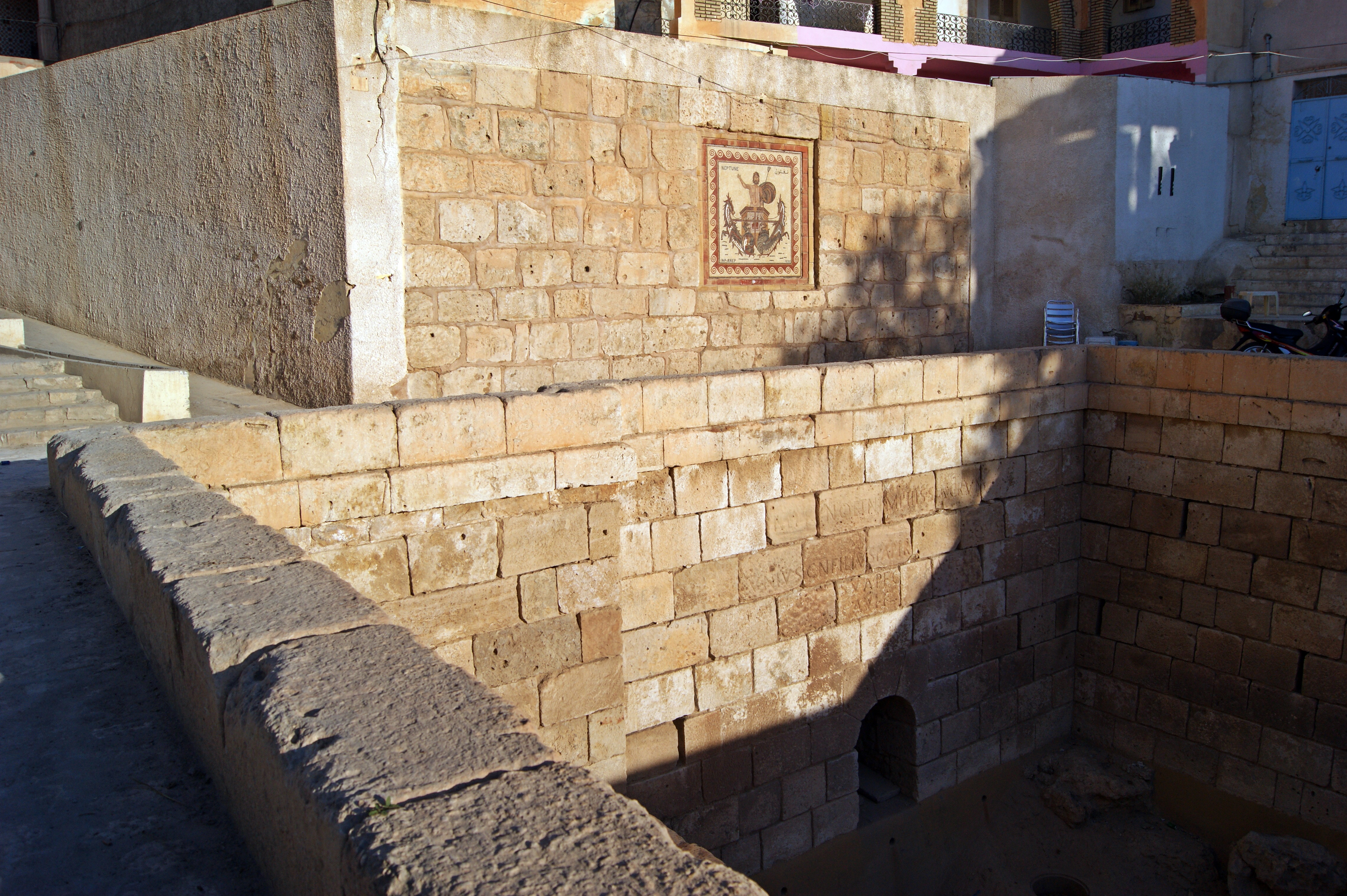
Roman mosaic over one of the pools

The "Roman pools" are three basins with high walls of reused ashlar. Set in the open air, around springs rising from the bottom of the pools, they are aligned E-W according to the direction of the outflow of the water and connected by underground channels. The W pool consists of two covered rooms. Princeton E.

What remains of Roman Capsa are two pools, the Roman baths of Gafsa dedicated to Neptune and the nymphs (these are the only visible monuments of Roman times and actually are a tourism attraction). Roman cisterns are still evident in the city ruins and still can be used. Indeed the pools consist of two 4 meter deep pools enclosed by high walls made of cut stone, that bear traces of inscriptions. The two pools communicate with each other through a dry-walled vault and are reinforced by small arches: they are fed by springs that gush out at the bottom of the tanks at a temperature of 31 °C.

Little remains of the ancient Gafsa, but can be still seen the wonderful Roman tanks, deep more than eight meters wide, seventeen and twenty-three long.

However a number of ancient finds have been made in the "casbah" area of actual Gafsa; for example, a large mosaic (4.7 x 3.4 m) was found 300 m E in an undetermined Roman monument of Capsa. Now at the Bardo Museum in Tunis, it depicts an amphitheater circus scene.

Capsa is considered, by historians like Camps and Laverde, the place in north Africa where the last speakers of the African Romance survived until the thirteenth century. Spoken Latin or Romance is surely attested in Capsa and Monastir by al-Idrisi in the 12th century.

During the Roman era the city was the seat of an ancient bishopric

Documents give the names of a few of the bishops of Capsa. Indeed in the 3rd century, Donatulus took part in the council that Saint Cyprian convoked in Carthage in 256 to discuss the problem of the "Lapsi".

In the 4th century, at the Council of Carthage (349 AD), Fortunatianus of Capsa was present, mentioned as the first among the bishops of Byzacena. A Donatist bishop of Capsa called Quintasius was at the council held at Cabarsussi in 393 AD by a breakaway group of Donatists led by Maximianus. In the 5th century, at the joint Council of Carthage (411 AD) presided by Marcellinus of Carthage and attended by Catholics and Donatists, Gams and Morcelli say Capsa was represented by the Donatist Donatianus, and that it had no Catholic bishop. According to the more recent Mesnage, Donatianus was instead the Donatist bishop of Capsus in Numidia, and Capsa in Byzacena was represented by the Catholic Fortunatus and the Donatist Celer, whom the earlier sources attributed to Capsus. All three sources agree in attributing to Capsa the Vindemialis who was one of the Catholic bishops whom Huneric summoned to Carthage in 484 AD and then exiled. However, the latest editions of the "Roman Martyrology", which commemorates Vindemialis on 2 May, call him bishop of Capsus in Numidia.

Capsa still had resident bishops at the end of the 9th century, being mentioned in a "Notitia Episcopatuum" of Leo VI the Wise (886–912), but a community may have lasted until the early 12th century (or even the early 13/14th century).

== The Romanization of Capsa ==
Capsa during Roman times has had an importance similar to the nearby Thysdrus in what is now central-southern Tunisia and as a colony of veterans from central Italy it was a center of Romance African language (and, in a minor level, of Christianity).

In other words, the presence of these veterans and their families created a kind of "Romanized stronghold" in the region, that survived for many centuries during the early Middle Ages.

Capsa became a municipium of veterans of the Legio III Augusta (based in Lambaesis) under Trajan and subsequently a colonia fully Romanized. It seems that in the early 4th century, Diocletian personally transferred the headquarters of the Legio III Augusta from Lambaesis to another, unknown base within the region that probably was Capsa.

Capsa grew in importance under Hadrian. Later, during the decades of Septimius Severus the town had more than 100,000 inhabitants and was a key important commercial center of the Roman limes in Africa.

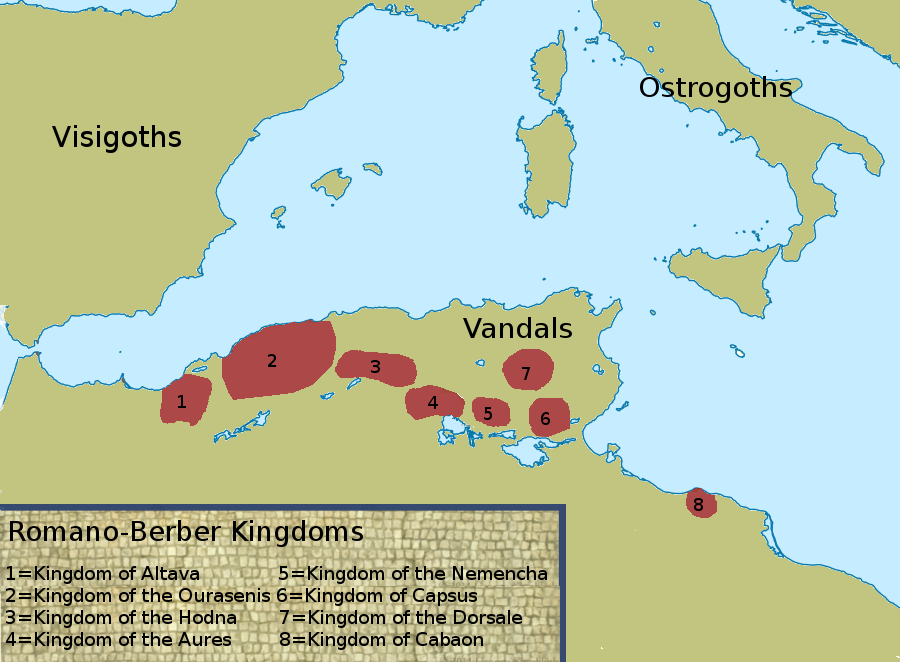
Map showing the Romanised Berber Kingdom of Capsus

Under the Byzantines, it was their main centre of defence against the Berber desert nomads of the region, with a fort built by Justinian's general Solomon. The Byzantines called the city Justiniana, endowed it with huge walls in 540 AD and amplified their work of Christianization.

In the next century the city was the capital of the Kingdom of Capsus, ruled by Romanised Berbers.

Successively, when the Arabs arrived in the late seventh century the city was partially destroyed and many of his inhabitants were sent as slaves toward Damascus in a long march through the north African coastal desert that decimated most of them. The historian Decret François wrote that this massacre was the beginning of the "extermination" of Christian Romanized Africa, one of the first ethnic cleansings in history (the Maghreb region actually is fully Muslim and Arab/Berber).

The strategic Roman road between Capsa and the port of Gabes, originally built by Tiberius in 14 BC, had to allow above all the III Legio Augusta to move with relative ease in that vast area and to prevent the tribes of the desert - the Getuli of the mountainous Numidia and the Garamantes of the Libyan desert - to attack the Roman cities and villas. Between Capsa and Gabes the Legion stopped for rest and created five stations.

== See also ==
- African Romance
- Fossatum Africae
- Capsian culture
- Kingdom of Capsus
- Thysdrus
- Gafsa Oases

== Bibliography ==
- Baradez, J. Fossatum Africae. Recherches Aériennes sur l'organisation des confins Sahariens a l'Epoque Romaine. Arts et Métiers Graphiques, Paris, 1949
- Gabriel Camp. Rex gentium Maurorum et Romanorum. Recherches sur les royaumes de Maurétanie des VIe et VIIe siècles. Antiquités africaines Année 1984 20 pp. 183-218 ()
- Lewicki, Tadeusz (1958). Une langue romaine oubliée de l'Afrique du Nord. Observations d'un arabisant (in French). Vol. (1951–1952) 17. (Rocznik Orient. XVII-1958), p. 415–480
- Rushworth, Alan. From Periphery to Core in Late Antique Mauretania. Theoretical Roman Archaeology Journal (1999): 90–103. doi:10.16995/TRAC1999_90_103.
- Saumagne, C. Capsa: les vestiges de la cité latine CahTun (1962) p. 519-31.
