= Kingdom of Capsus =

Romano-Berber kingdom in North Africa

- Map of the Romano-Berber Kingdoms, according to the French historian Christian Courtois.
- Capital: Capsa
- Common languages: Berber, African Romance

The Kingdom of Capsus is the name given to a postulated Romano-Berber kingdom located in North Africa and centered around Capsa. The existence of the kingdom was proposed by the French historian Christian Courtois in his 1955 book Les Vandales Et L'Afrique, based on a comment made by Victor Vitensis in his work Historia persecutionis Africanae Provinciae. Not much is known about this kingdom, and if it did exist, it was likely conquered by Belisarius during or after the Vandalic War, given that by the 6th century, the city of Capsa had become a Byzantine holding.
