= Decapsulation =

Decapsulation may refer to:

- Decapping, removing the protective cover of a microchip so that the contained die is revealed
- Decapsulation machinery, an example of equipment used to prepare samples for microscopy
- A step in the reproductive cycle of Synspermiata

== See also ==
- Encapsulation (disambiguation)
