= Sidi Mansour Mosque =

Mosque in Tunis, Tunisia

- جامع سيدي منصور
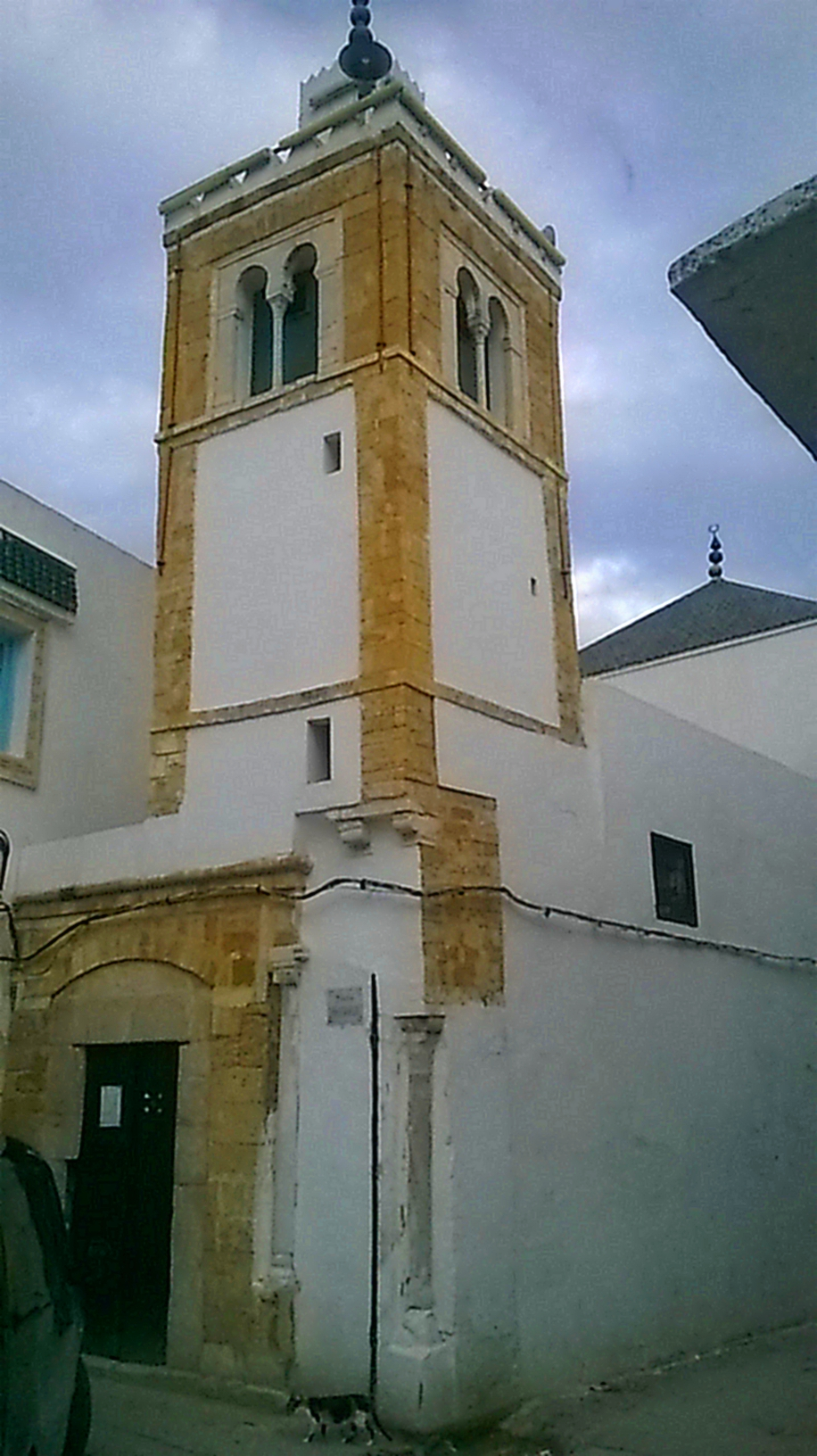

- Location within Tunisia

Location
- Interactive map of Sidi Mansour Mosque
- Coordinates: 36.790086°N 10.176666°E

Architecture
- Type: Mosque

Sidi Mansour Mosque (Arabic: جامع سيدي منصور) is a Tunisian mosque in El Hajjamine quarter, attached to the Bab El Jazira suburb in the south of the Medina of Tunis.

== Localization ==
The mosque can be found in Sidi Mansour Street, near Bab El Fellah, one of the gates of the medina.

== Etymology ==
The mosque was named after the saint Sidi Mansour Abou Daliah (Arabic: سيدي منصور أبودالية), attached to the Idrisid dynasty that ruled Morocco between 789 and 985. He was born in Fes and died in Gafsa in the 15th century.

== History ==
According to Hayet El Mejri, the kouttab of the mosque existed in 1875.

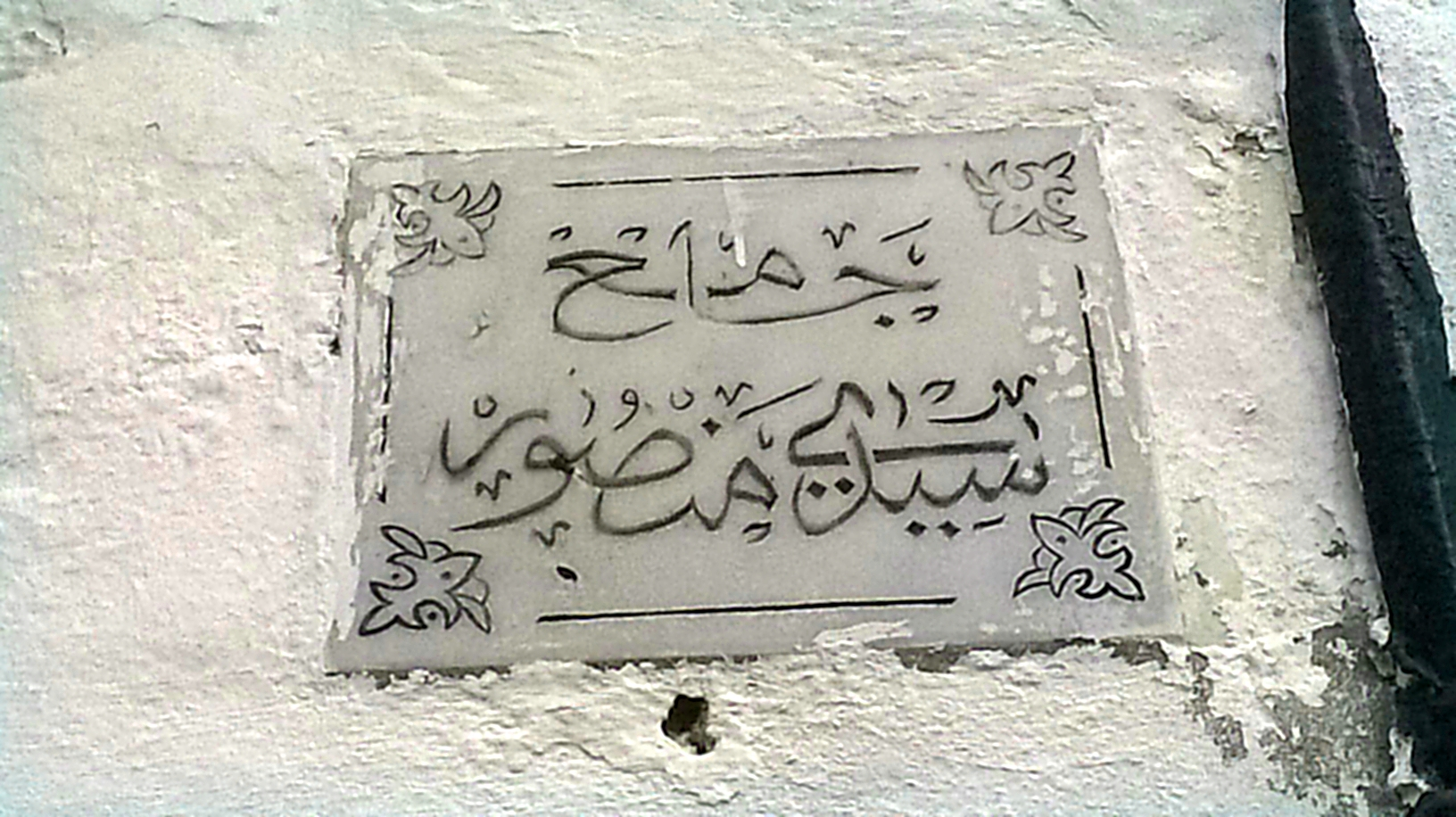
Marble panel with the name of the mosque

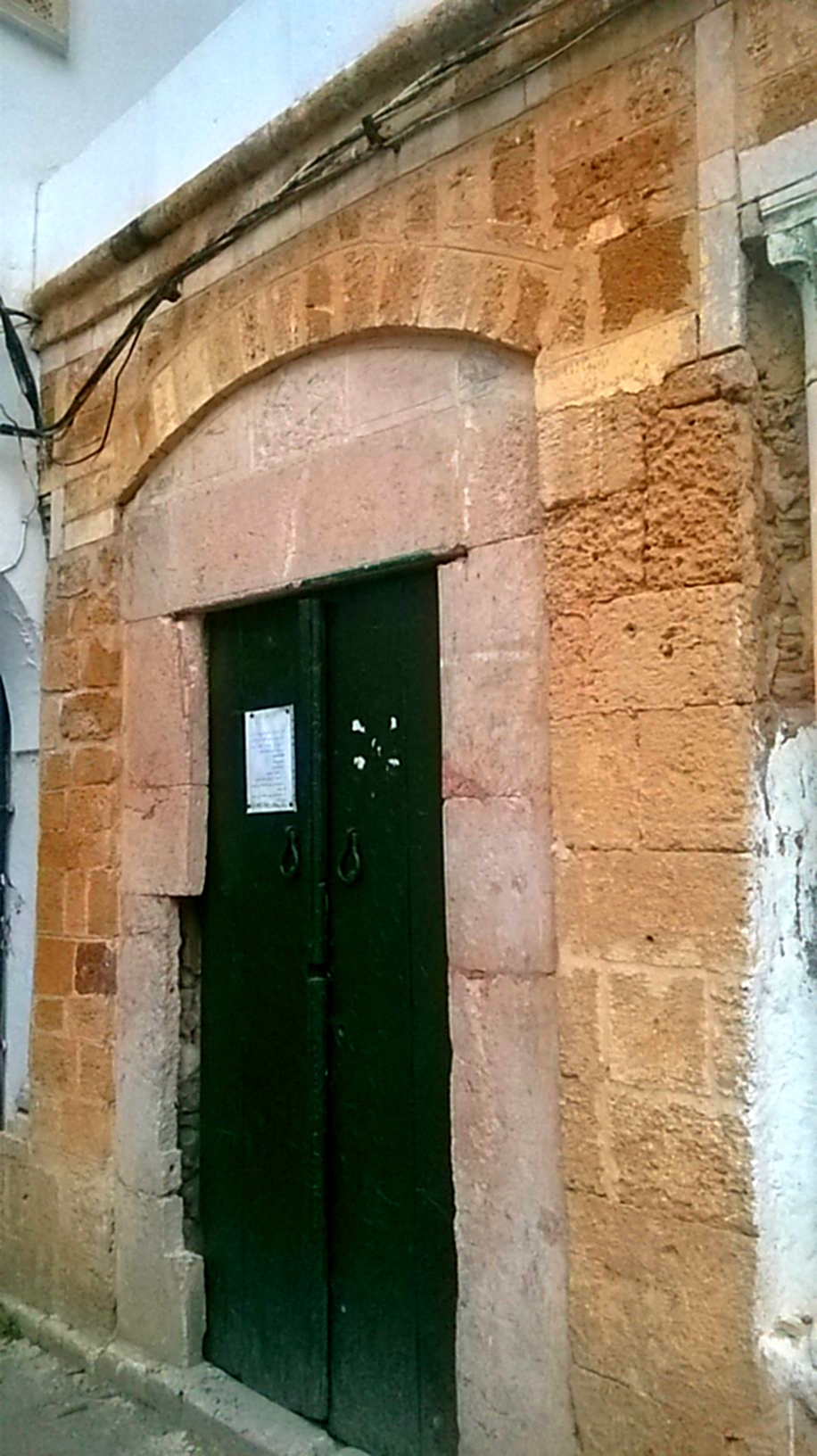
Entrance of the mosque

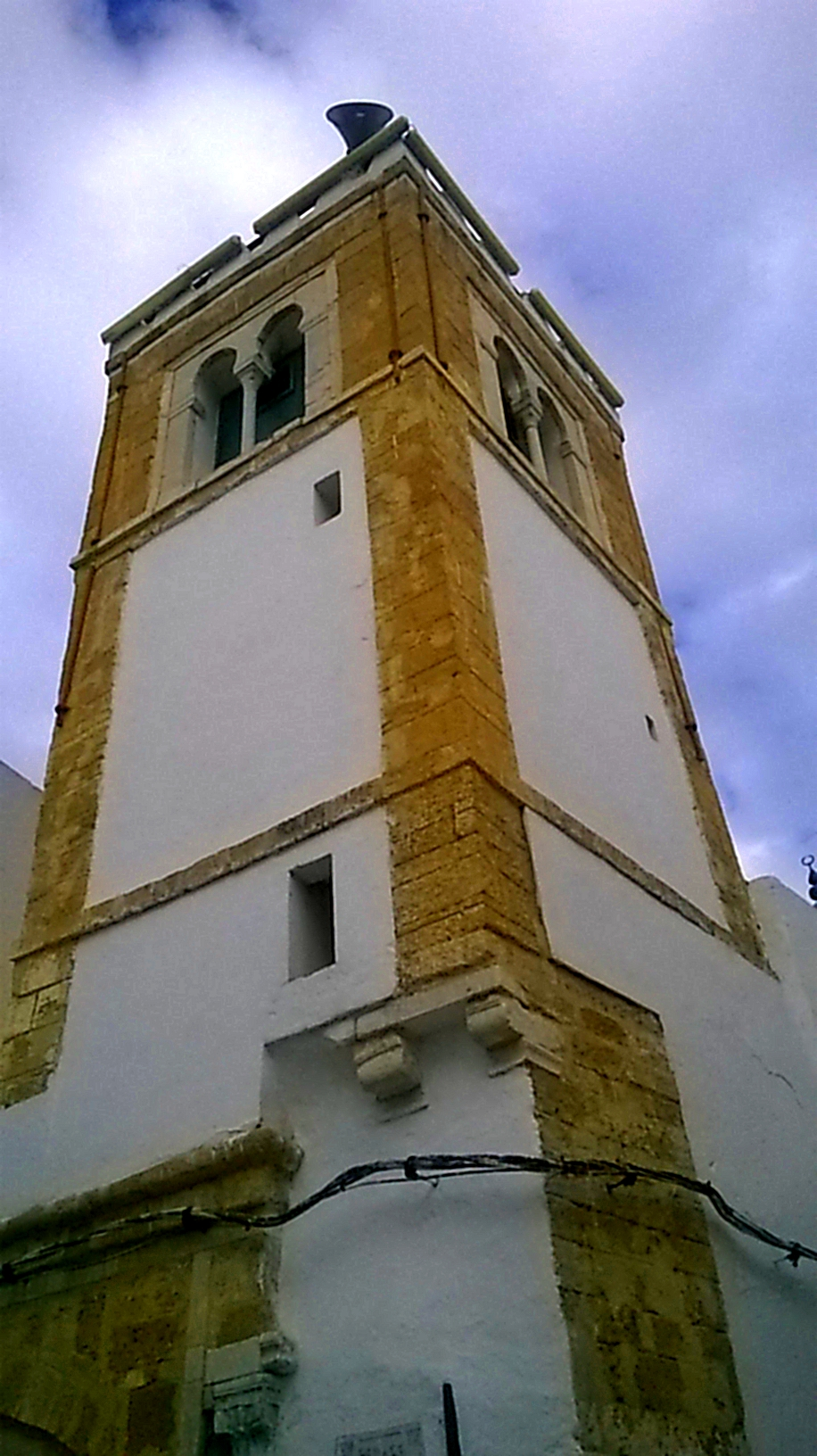
Minaret of the mosque

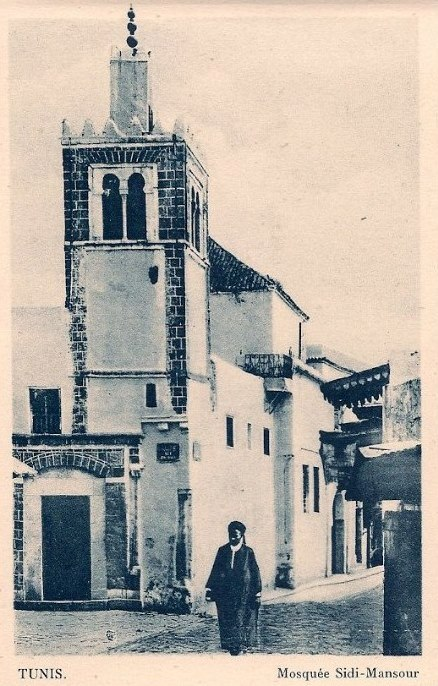
Sidi Mansour mosque in 1920
