= École Supérieure d'Ingénieurs Privée de Gafsa =

Academic institution in Tunisia

- Location: Campus universitaire Sidi Ahmed Zarroug, Gafsa, Tunisia; 34.429551°N 8.760239°E
- Website: www.esip.tn
- Location in Tunisia

École Supérieure d'Ingénieurs Privée de Gafsa is a private engineering school in Gafsa, Tunisia. It is located at the Campus universitaire Sidi Ahmed Zarroug, where a number of other postsecondary institutions are located.
