= Oued Miliane =

Wadi in Tunisia

Coordinates: 36°46′N 10°17′E

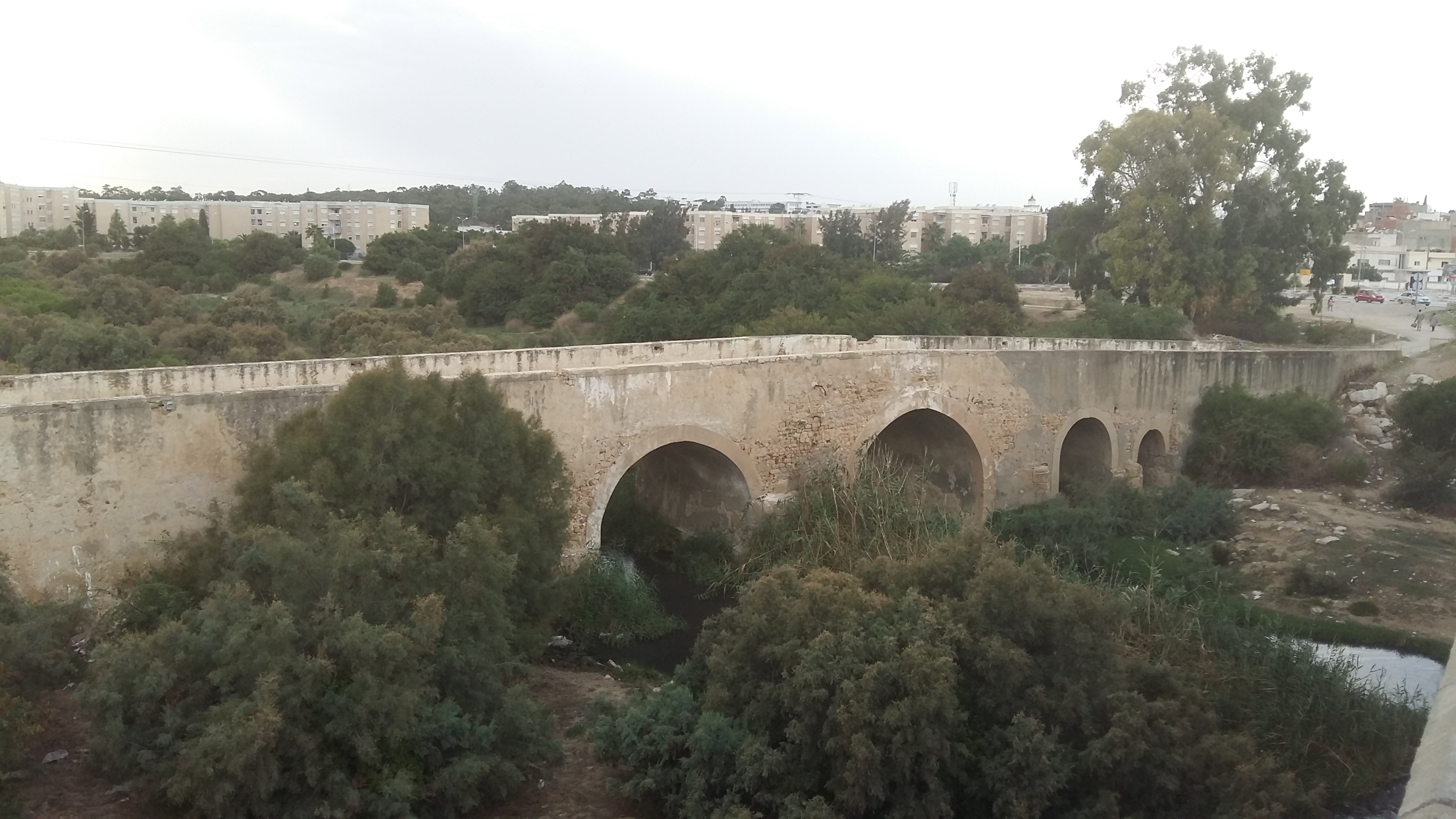
Ancient Bridge over Meliane river.

The Meliane River (وادي مليان), also known as Oued Miliane, is a river that flows into the Gulf of Tunis located in the North Eastern coast of Tunisia.

The River starts near Djebel Bargou (جبل برقو) mountains and drains a watershed of about 2000 km². The Oued Miliane has a number of tributaries including Oued el Hamma, and is the second longest course perennial river in the country after the Medjerda.

== Geography ==
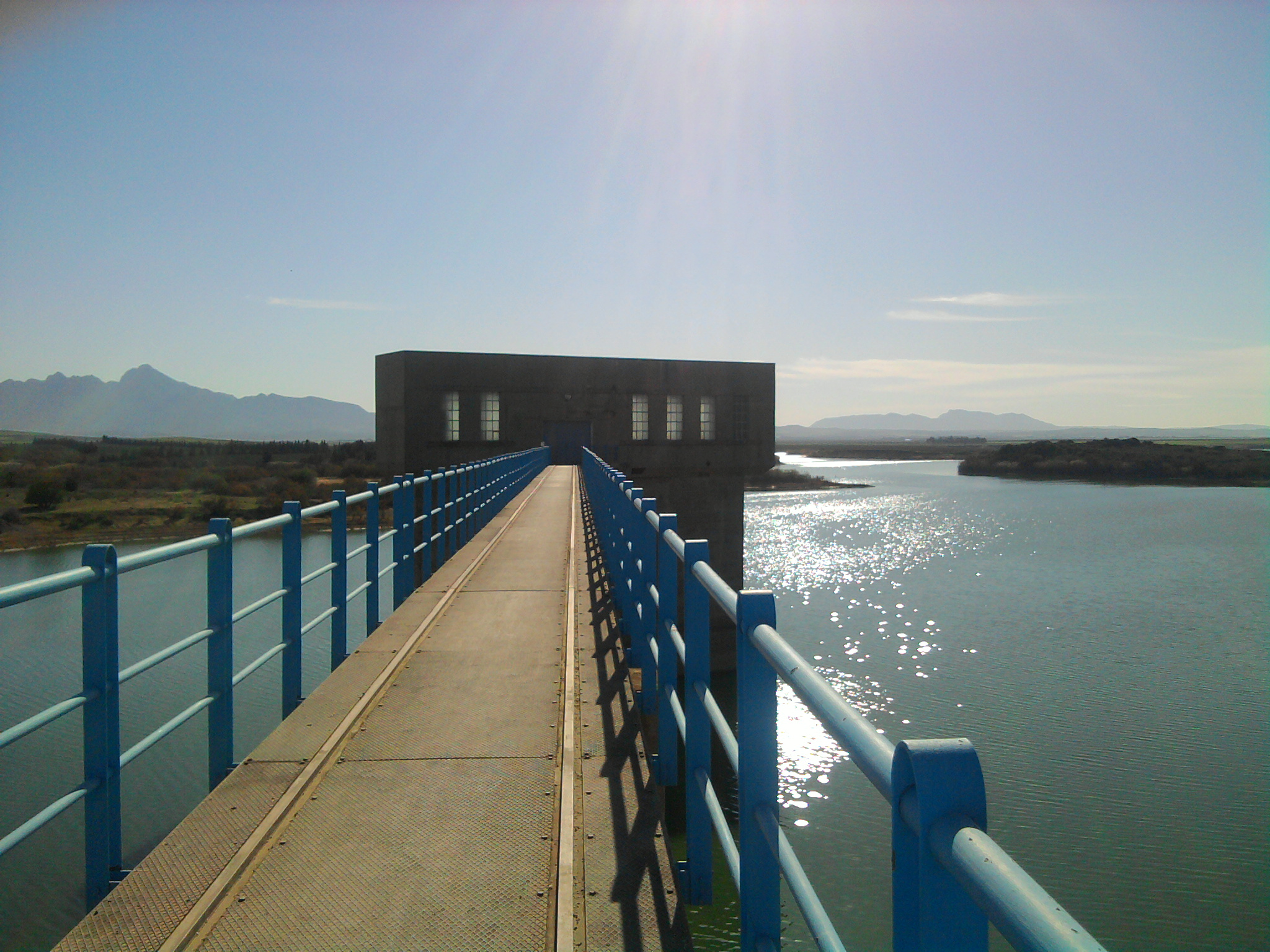
Bir Mcherga Dam.

It takes its source in the mountains of Jebel Bargou, peaking at 1280 meters, and flows into the Gulf of Tunis between the towns of Radès and Ezzahra . It has a catchment area of 2283 km 2 in a relatively watered medium (400 to 450 millimeters of annual rainfall) and is joined by Wadi Kabir (upstream) and Wadi El Hamma (downstream).

The rivers flow is irregular, up to 200 m 3 / s during floods, but it is one of the few rivers in Tunisia maintained flow during the summer, as recalled in the etymological sense of Arab, meaning Miliane "full".

It is characterized by high load alluvial estimated at 25 grams per liter, which corresponds to 1.5 million tonnes of sediments carried each year. This helped to fertilize the plain of Mornag (a rich agricultural region south of Tunis dedicated to market gardening and viticulture), but also to participate in the closing of the Tunis Lake and the birth of a cord of dunes on coastline between Rades and Hammam Lif. The bed of the river has moved over the last centuries.

The Bir Mcherga Dam is on the river.
