= Capsule =

Capsule may refer to:

== Biology and medicine ==
- Articular capsule (joint capsule), an envelope surrounding a synovial joint
- Bacterial capsule, a layer that lies outside the cell wall of bacteria
- Bowman's capsule (glomerular capsule), a sac surrounding a glomerulus in a mammalian kidney
- Capsular contracture, the scar tissue naturally forming around breast implants
- Capsule (fruit), or seed capsule, a type of dry fruit like the poppy, iris or foxglove
- Capsule (pharmacy), a small gelatinous case enclosing a dose of medication
- Glisson's capsule, a fibrous layer covering the external surface of the liver
- Lens capsule Membrane surrounding the lens withing the eyeball
- Lymph node capsule
- Renal capsule, a tough fibrous layer surrounding the kidney
- Yeast capsule, a layer surrounding some pathogenic yeasts

=== Capsules of the brain ===
- External capsule
- Extreme capsule
- Internal capsule

== Other uses ==
- Capsule (band), a Japanese electronic duo
- Capsule (CRM), a Customer Relationship Management SaaS web application and mobile app
- Capsule (Ferris wheel), a passenger compartment
- Capsule (geometry), a shape consisting of a cylinder capped with hemispheres
- Capsule hotel, a type of very dense overnight lodging popular in urban Japan
- Capsule (microphone), the component which converts acoustic energy into an electric signal
- Capsule neural network, a type of artificial neural network
- Capsule review, short critique
- Capsule toy, vending machine prize
- Capsule (website), an event-sharing social platform
- Space capsule, a type of crewed spacecraft
- The Capsule, a 2012 Greek short film
- Time capsule, a cache of items and/or information to be preserved for future times

== See also ==
- Encapsulation (disambiguation)
