= List of Byzantine forts and other structures in the Maghreb =

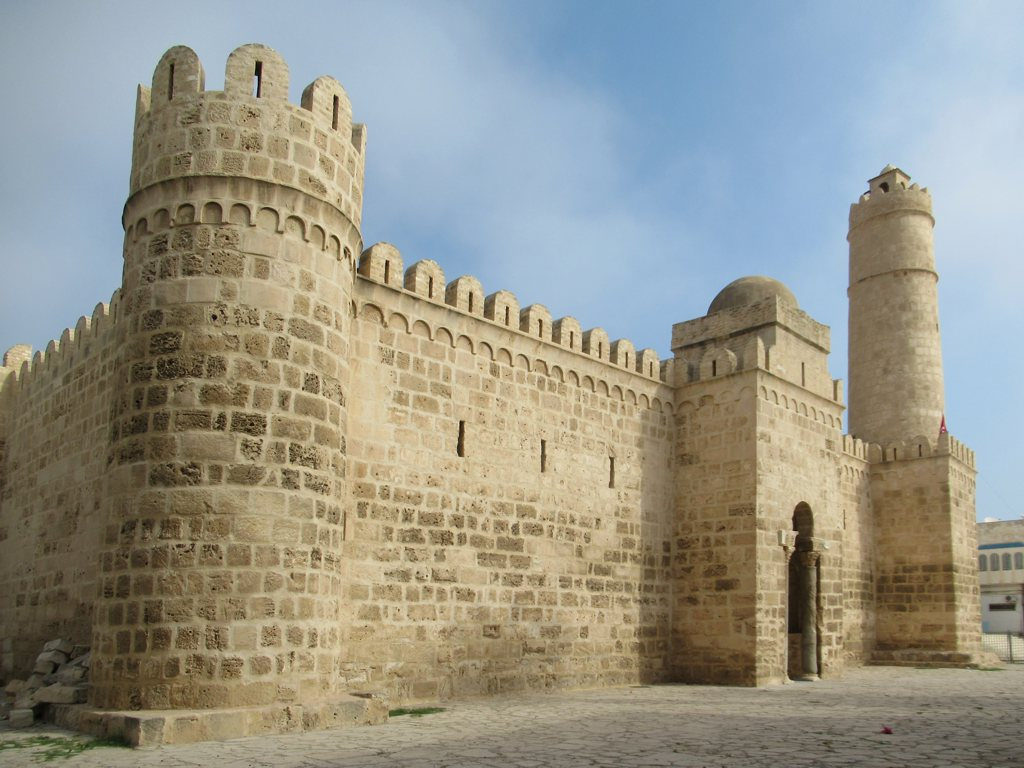
Built in the 8th century, the Ribat of Sousse in Tunisia was inspired by Byzantine fortifications; the tower served as a minaret for the garrison soldiers

The List of Byzantine forts and other structures in the Maghreb lists photos of the fortresses built between 533 and 698 on the territory of the Byzantine Empire in the Maghreb. On one hand, they served to pacify the Berbers within the empire and, on the other hand, to ward off external enemies.

== Background ==
The Vandals, who had ruled in the heartland of the former Roman Province of Africa since 439, had considerable difficulties defending the national borders against the Berbers or keeping the Berbers under Vandal rule under control. which prompted large landowners and smallholders alike to fortify their farms. After the Eastern Roman reconquest of the areas conquered by the Vandals in the 5th century and renewed subjugation of small Roman-Berber states established in the same period, various fortresses were built there both on the border as well as within the area ruled by the Eastern Romans. Some of the smaller Roman forts were also repaired.

== Essentials ==
Construction of the fortresses took place mainly during the second term of office of the praetorian prefect Solomon 539 to 544, whereby the substance of older Roman buildings was often used as building material. Most of the fortresses are significantly smaller than their Roman predecessors and mostly classify as forts. Many of these forts were subsequently used and rebuilt by the Arabs and Ottomans. In parts they even served as a stylistic template for the construction of their own fortresses. In addition, building material from Byzantine buildings was used for the construction of a number of Arab fortresses, such as the Fort Sidi Salem Bou Ghara near the Roman city of Gigthis. This makes it considerably more difficult to identify a fortress in the Maghreb as Byzantine.

== Overview ==
Overview of Byzantine Fortresses in the Maghreb

Name (Latin)	Description	Location	Time of construction	Size	Image
Aggar	Inland fortress in southern Africa Proconsularis	Sidi Amara	no data available	0,05 ha	
Ammaedara	Border fortress in the far west of the Byzacena	Haïdra	between 534 and 565	2,55 ha	
Capsa	Border fortress in southern Byzacena	Gafsa	no data available	k. A.	
Chusira	Inland fortress	La Kesra	arguably between 534 and 565, more likely before 544	0,28 ha	
Civitas Vazitana Sarra	Inland fortress in Africa Proconsularis	Henchir-Bez	no data available	0,06 ha	
Clupea	Inland fortress protecting the namesake city, modified in Ottoman times	Kelibia	no data available	k. A.	
Cuicul	Inland fortress protecting the namesake city in Mauretania Sitifensis	Djémila	no data available	0,03 ha	
Gadiaufala	Inland fortress in Numidia	Ksar Sbahi	between 539 and 544	0,16 ha	https://www.leguidetouristique.com/ruinesbr/fort-byzantine-gadiovala-ksar-al-sobihi
Iunci	Inland fortress on the coast of the Byzacena	(Younga) near Sfax	during the tenure of Justin II. (566–578)	no data available	
Lamasba	Inland/border fortress in the Belezma range often called Ksar Belezma	Mérouana	between 536 and 544	1,4 ha	
Lambaesis	Inland/border fortress south of the Belezma range	Tazoult-Lambèse	no data available	no data available	
Leptis Magna	Fortified coastal city in Tripolitania	Leptis Magna	arguably between 533 and 565	28 ha	
Limisa	Inland fortress in the north of the Byzacena	Ksar Lemsa	arguably between 585 and 600	0,09 ha	
Mactaris	Inland fortress in Africa Proconsularis	Maktar	no data available	0,35 ha	
Madauros	Inland fortress close to the coast in Mauretania Sitifensis	Madauros	between 534 and 544	0,24 ha	
Musti	Inland fortress in Africa Proconsularis	Mustis	no data available	0,2 ha	
?	Inland fortress	Ksar El Hadid	no data available	no data available	
Oea	Fortified coastal city in Tripolitania	Tripolis	presumably by Phoenicians in the 7th century b.C.	no data available	
Sabratha	Fortified coastal city in Tripolitania	Sabrata	arguably between 533 and 565	9,0 ha	
Sicca Veneria	Inland fortress to protect the city	El Kef	arguably between 533 and 565	no data available	
Sitifis	Inland fortress to protect the city	Sétif	between 539 and 544	1,69 ha	
Suas	Inland fortress in Africa Proconsularis	Chaouach	no data available	no data available.	
Sufetula	Inland fortress in the far southwest of the Byzacena	Sbeitla	no data available	no data available	
Thamugadi	Inland/border fortress in Numidia	Timgad	539/540	0,75 ha	
Thagura	Inland fortress in Numidien	close to Souq Ahras	539/or 548 („before the death of Theodora“)	0,53 ha	https://www.leguidetouristique.com/ruinesbr/thagura-taoura
Theveste	Fortified town in eastern Numidia	Tebessa	between 536 and 544	7,5 ha	
Thignica	Inland fortress in Africa Proconsularis	Ain Tounga	arguably before the death of Justinian I. 565	0,28 ha	
Tipasa	Basilika an der Küste von Mauretania Prima	Tipasa	no data available	no data available	
Tipasa	Inland fortress, possibly city fortifications in Numidien	Tifech	presumably before 553	2,25 ha	https://harba-dz.com/annuaire-algerie/41-wilaya-de-souk-ahras/site-de-tiffeche-tipaza-de-numidie/
Tubunae	Border fortress in Mauretania Sitifensis	Tobna	in the 6.th century, no details	0,50 ha	https://www.leguidetouristique.com/ruinesbr/tobna
Tubernuc	Structure of unknown purpose in Africa Proconsularis	close to Grombalia	no data available	no data available	
Vaga	inland fortress in Numidia	Béja	before the death of Empress Theodora in 548	no data available	
Vescera?	Possible border fortress in Numidien	Biskra	no data available	no data available	
Zabi	Possible border fortress in Mauretania Sitifensis	M'Sila, Ortsteil Bechilga	no data available	no data available	
Zaga?	Potential inland fortress in Africa Proconsularis	Ksar Zaga	no data available	no data available	
Zucchara	Inland fortress in southern Africa Proconsularis	Ain-Djoukar	no data available	no data available	

== Literature ==
- Denys Pringle: The Defence of Byzantine Africa from Justinian to the Arab Conquest. An Account of the Military History and Archaeology of the African Provinces in the Sixth and Seventh Century (= British Archaeological Reports. International Series 99). British Archaeological Reports, Oxford 1981, ISBN 0-86054-119-3 (reprint 2001).
- Averil Cameron: Vandal and Byzantine Africa. In: Averil Cameron, Bryan Ward-Perkins, Michael Whitby (editor): The Cambridge Ancient History. Volume 14: Late Antiquity. Empire and Successors. AD 425–600. Cambridge University Press, Cambridge 2000, ISBN 0-521-32591-9, p. 552–569.
- Susan Raven: Rome in Africa. 3rd edition, Routledge, London, 1993, ISBN 0-415-08150-5, p. 209–230.
- further pictures not usable in Wikipedia for copyright reasons: Résultats de recherche pour : fort byzantin
