= Gafsa oases =

Historic agroforestry system in Tunisia

Coordinates: 34.3989102°N 8.7646388°E

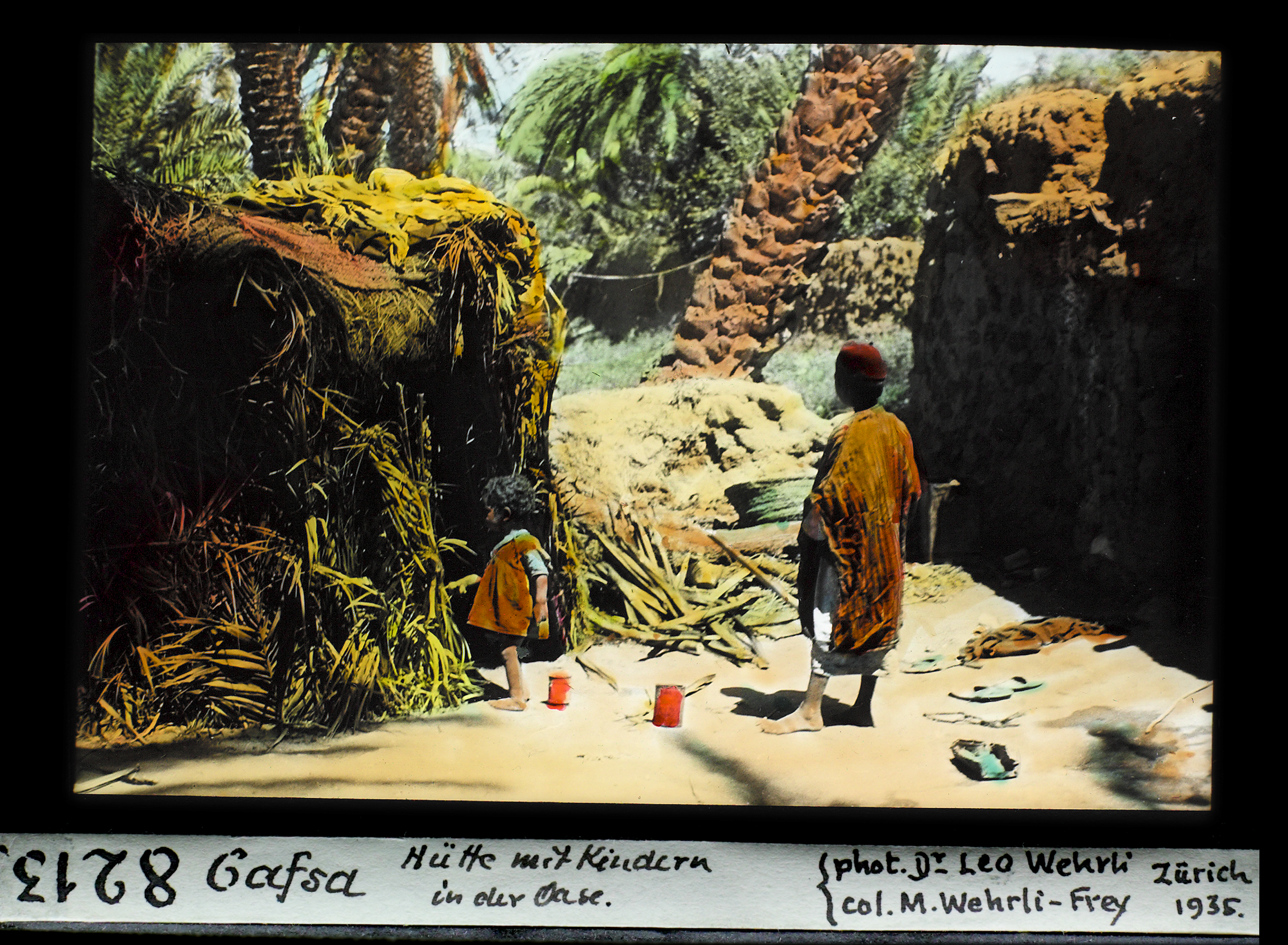
Hand-colored photograph of Gafsa Oases Tunisia, circa 1935

Gafsa Oases (Arabic: واحة قفصة, French: Oasis de Gafsa) are date palm oases at Gafsa in southwestern Tunisia, near the northern edge of the Sahara Desert. The Gafsa Oases were known to the ancient Romans and cover approximately 700 hectares. The oases were designated a Globally Important Agricultural Heritage System in 2011. The individual oases are called Sakdoud, Ksar, Lela, Gafsa and El Guettar.

== Background ==
An oasis is an intensive human-mediated agroforestry system located in an arid or semi-arid climate, usually located in close proximity to an underground aquifer. The Oases of the Maghreb specifically have been described as “islands of lush greenery that flourish amidst the harsh and restrictive conditions of a desert ecosystem.” Date palm oases in the southern part of Tunisia are historically watered through the farrow and basin irrigation technique.

There are an estimated 50 historic date palm oases in Tunisia, another 100 in neighboring Algeria, and still more in Morocco, totaling roughly 181,000 hectares. The oases generally use a three-layer agroforestry system of cereal and vegetables at the base, fruit trees including apricot trees in the middle, and date palms serving as the overstory.

The GIAHS designation means the oases qualify as “remarkable land use systems and landscapes which are rich in globally significant biological diversity evolving from the co-adaptation of a community with its environment and its needs and aspirations for sustainable development.”

== Description ==
The town of Gafsa sits on a hill above the oasis. The Gafsa Oases host 23 species of date palm, as well as 11 other species of fruit tree. The understory trees are mainly local varieties of olive.

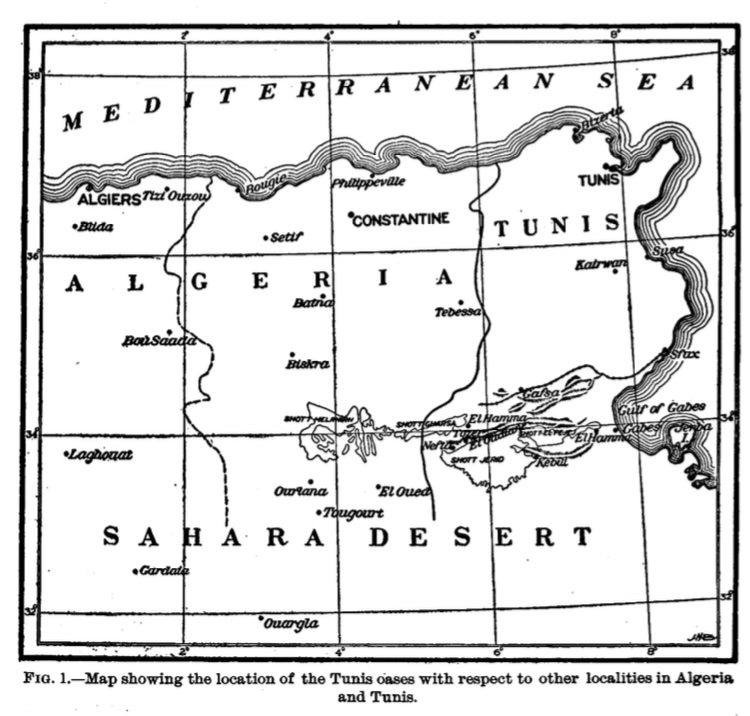
Map published 1906 of Tunisian and Algerian date palm oases, including Gafsa

At the time of a U.S. Department of Agriculture bulletin on Date Varieties and Date Culture in Tunis published in 1906, “Tributary to the oasis of Gafsa itself are one or two other oases of small importance. Gafsa oasis contains from 50,000 to 65,000 date palms…The water supply is more than ample for the present extent of the oasis. The date is here hardly a more important crop than the olive, of which there are many thousands of trees. Oil varieties predominate. At the beginning of the Christian era Gafsa (then known as Capsa) was included in the great olive zone that extended from the east coast of Tunis across into Algeria, and of which only scattered fragments remain…The pomegranates of Gafsa are considered the best grown.“

According to a United Nations report: “The traditional social water management system has been largely replaced by the association of farmers for water management (Groupement d’Intéret Collectif: GIC for water), the cooperative of agricultural services, Omda (responsible for the smallest administrative unit), the agricultural engineering services, and local farmer unions.”

== History ==
The location was known to and was described by various ancient, medieval and Renaissance chroniclers, including Sallust, El-Bekri, and Leon l’Africane. The site is located near Limes Tripolitanus, a historic boundary of the Roman Empire, and the water from the oasis and underlying aquifer was likely delivered by canal to a defensive fortress in the valley (wadi).

== Concerns and criticism ==
A 1906 American report on the main oasis was critical of the quality of the dates produced there, and “at the present time the culture of the olive as carried on at Gafsa leaves much to be desired, and the gardens are generally not well cared for.”

A 2009 report in a Dutch magazine also expressed concerns: “With the use of water pumps, the oasis has been expanded to 3500 hectares over the last few decades. Because of uncontrolled water pumping, the water table is steadily going down: after 20 centuries of providing refreshment, the naturally fed Roman bath in the old town has been dry for a few years. The oasis does not look fresh.”

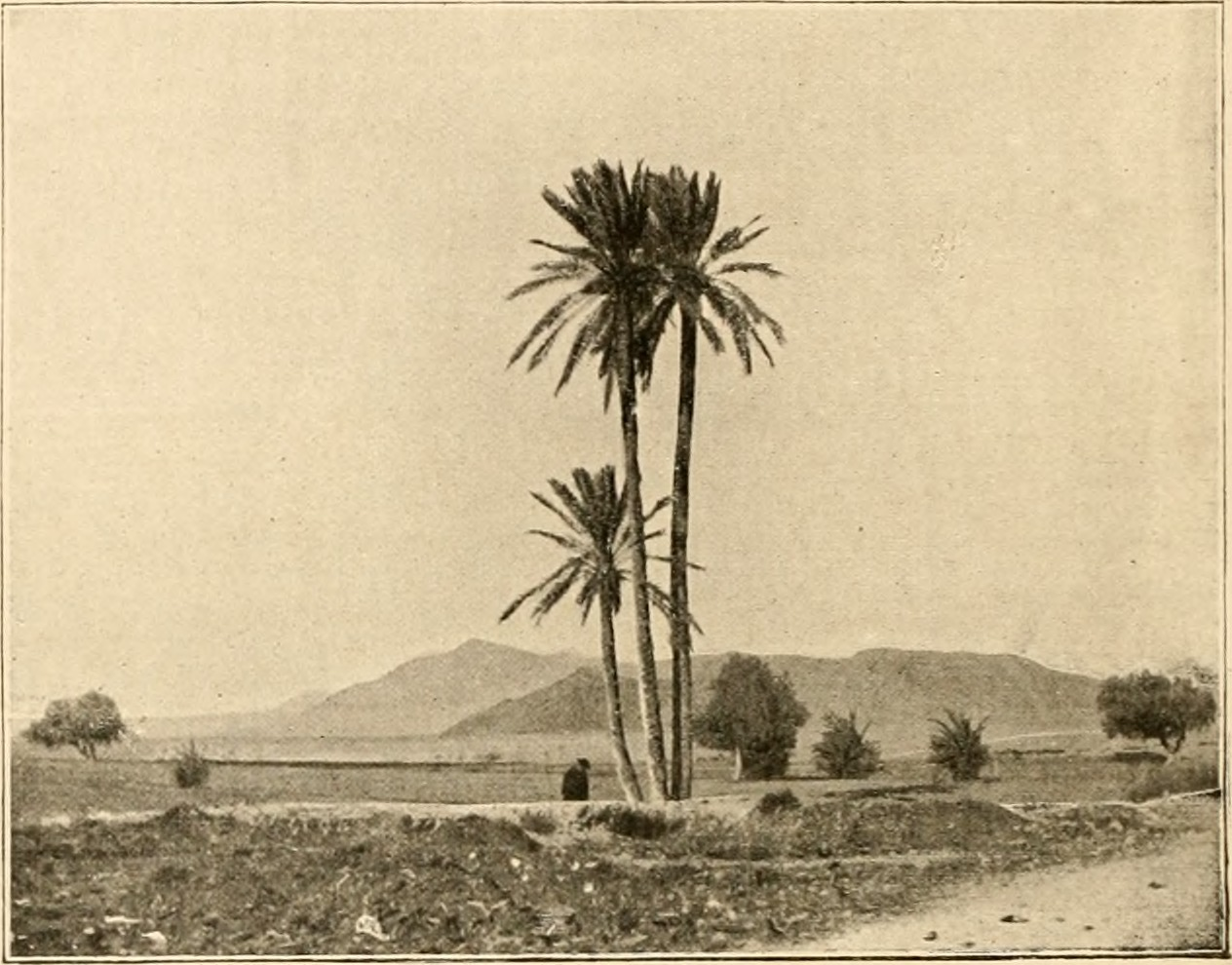
Gafsa, photograph taken by Doctor Tersen; illustration from Jules Verne's novel Invasion of the Sea (1905).

== See also ==
- Roman baths of Gafsa
- List of Byzantine forts and other structures in the Maghreb
