= Lac de Gafsa =

Lake in Tunisia

Coordinates: 34.4174°N 8.5323°E

- Interactive map of Lac de Gafsa
- Location: Near Gafsa, Tunisia
- Type: Endorheic lake
- Primary inflows: Underground water source
- Primary outflows: Evaporation
- Basin countries: Tunisia
- Average depth: 18–20 meters (59–66 ft)

Lac de Gafsa, also called 'Mysterious Lake', appeared unexpectedly in 2014 alongside Om Laryes Road, 25 kilometers from the town of Gafsa in Tunisia. The origin or formation of the lake is not clear. The most likely explanation is that a minor earthquake had ruptured the rock above the water table, sending millions of cubic meters of water up to the surface.

== Reactions ==
Since the lake was discovered by desert shepherds, Lac de Gafsa has become a curiosity for locals and an overnight international tourist sensation. Hundreds have gone just to see the lake, to dive off the picturesque rocks and swim in the lake, and/or scuba dive in it since its discovery. Tunisian people living in the drought-ridden desert area of Lac de Gafsa call its creation and appearance a miracle or a curse.

== Radioactivity tests ==
The area is rich in phosphate and there are fears the water could be carcinogenic as it might contain radioactive residue. As of 2014, the water was undergoing testing by experts for contamination; however, at that time there was no official ban from swimming in the new lake. The lake, which is estimated to be between 18 and 20 meters (59 and 66 ft) deep, has changed from its clear turquoise blue color (as discovered) to a slightly murky green, meaning the fresh flow of water has ceased and the water is now stagnant.
