= Capsian =

Culture centered in the Maghreb that lasted from about 9000 to 5400 cal BC

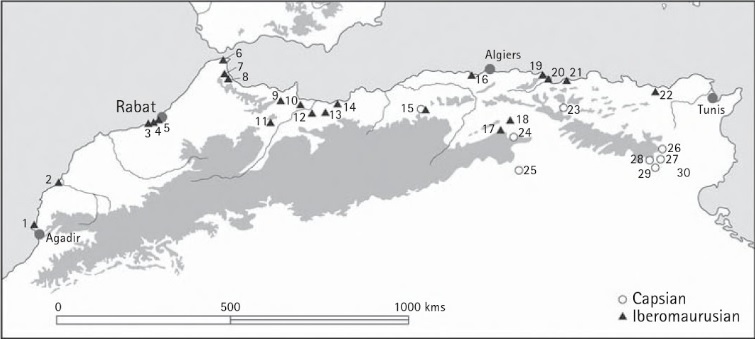
- Major Iberomaurisian and Capsian sites in Northwest Africa.
- Geographical range: Algeria and Tunisia
- Period: Epipalaeolithic or Later Stone Age
- Dates: c. 9000 – 5400 cal BC
- Type site: El Mekta
- Major sites: Medjez II, Relilaï, Kef Zoura D, El Mekta
- Preceded by: Iberomaurusian
- Followed by: Libyans

The Capsian was an Epipalaeolithic tradition in Algeria and Tunisia from ca. 9000 to 5400 cal BC. It is named after the town of Gafsa, Tunisia (Capsa in Latin).

The Capsian is traditionally divided into the Typical Capsian and the Upper Capsian, which are sometimes found in chronostratigraphic sequence. In terms of lithics, the differences between these divisions are both typological and technological.

During this period, the environment of the Maghreb was open savanna, much like modern East Africa, with Mediterranean forests at higher altitudes; where the initial phase overlaps with the African humid period. The Capsian diet included a wide variety of animals, ranging from aurochs and hartebeest to hares and snails; there is little evidence concerning plants eaten. During the succeeding Neolithic of Capsian Tradition, there is evidence from one site, for domesticated, probably imported, ovicaprids.

Given the Capsian culture's timescale, widespread occurrence in the Sahara, and geographic association with modern speakers of the Afroasiatic languages, historical linguists have tentatively associated the industry with the Afroasiatic family's earliest speakers on the continent.

Decorative art can be found at Capsian sites, including figurative and abstract rock art. Ochre is found on both tools and corpses. Ostrich eggshells were used to make beads and containers; seashells were used for necklaces. The Iberomaurusian practice of extracting the central incisors continued sporadically but became rarer.

Anatomically, Capsian populations were modern Homo sapiens, traditionally classed into two variegate types: Proto-Mediterranean and Mechta-Afalou on the basis of cranial morphology and anthropological traits. Some have argued that they were associated with Mediterranean immigrants from the east such as the Natufians/Pre-Pottery Neolithic, whereas others argue for a population continuity based on physical skeletal characteristics and other criteria. In 1950, 3 skulls from the Upper Capsian of the Maghreb were measured, and based on indicators of the craniofacial form, considered to have been mixed in traits. The overall anthropological investigation highlighted that their dominant characteristics were conforming to a Mediterranean type, while the minority characteristics conformed to Mechta-Afalou (Iberomarusian) and "Negroid" type. It was suggested that this population was the product of Pre-Neolithic Mectha-Afalous, "White" immigrants from the east, and African migrants from the south.

The Eburran industry which dates between 13,000 and 9,000 BC in East Africa, was formerly known as the "Kenya Capsian" due to similarities in the stone blade shapes.

== Genetics ==
Recent genetic studies have further illuminated the origins and diversity of Capsian populations. In 2025, a study by researchers from Harvard University analyzed the DNA of nine late Stone Age individuals from Tunisia and Algeria. The findings suggest that the inhabitants of North Africa during this period were predominantly of local North African origin, resembling the Stone Age populations from Taforalt and Ifri N'Ammar in Morocco. This indicates a broad geographical and temporal distribution of a distinctive genetic component in the region.

Some of these genomes had contributions from European farmers (~7,000 BP) and Levantine groups (~6,800 BP). Moreover, one sample from Djebba, Tunisia, revealed European hunter-gatherer ancestry dating back to around ~8,000 BP, likely due to human migrations across the Sicilian Straits. Other samples from the Greater East of Morocco demonstrated minimal genetic contributions from European farmers or Eastern groups, reflecting a relatively isolated genetic profile compared to southern Europe and other parts of the Mediterranean.

In terms of paternal haplogroups, the study identified the following lineages among the studied individuals:

The majority belonged to Haplogroup E-M215, with two specimens carrying the E-Z1902 lineage (a superclade of E-V65), one sample belonging to the E-M78 haplogroup, while two other individuals were assigned to the Haplogroup T-M184 on distinct branches.

While the maternal haplogroups included:

Two individuals with U6a, two with U6d, one with U6b, two with R, one with U5b, and lastly one with L3f1b-a. These findings align with earlier genetic data from Taforalt and Ifri n'Amr Ou Moussa caves in Morocco. At Taforalt, all samples belonged to the E-M78* haplogroup, while samples from Ifri n'Amr Ou Moussa included E-L19 and a unique E-PF2545 subclade within the E-M81 lineage.

== Gallery ==
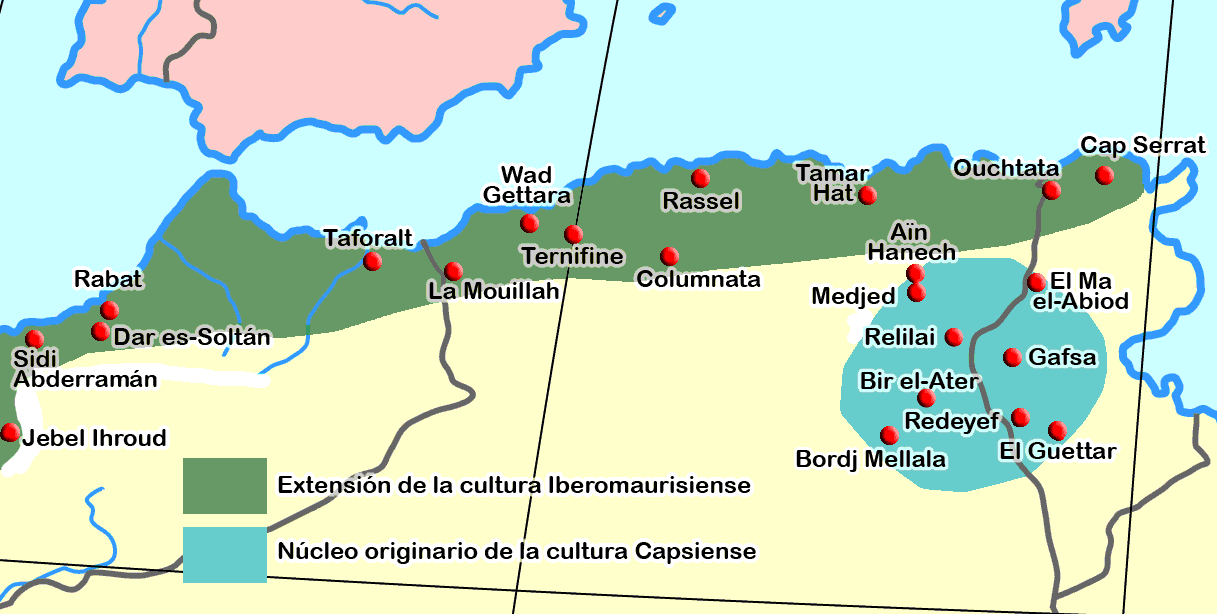
The main sites of the Iberomaurusian and Capsian cultures in north Africa

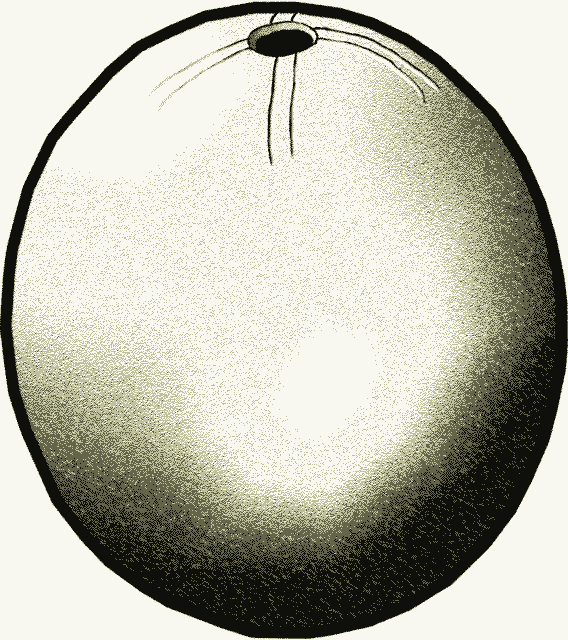
A Capsian ostrich-egg bottle

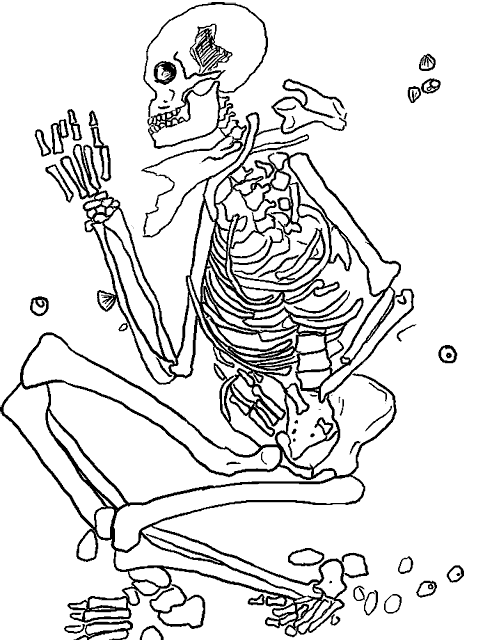
Capsian burial (Tunisia)

== See also ==
- African humid period
