= Djebel Bargou =

Mountains in Tunisia

Coordinates: 36°04′N 9°36′E

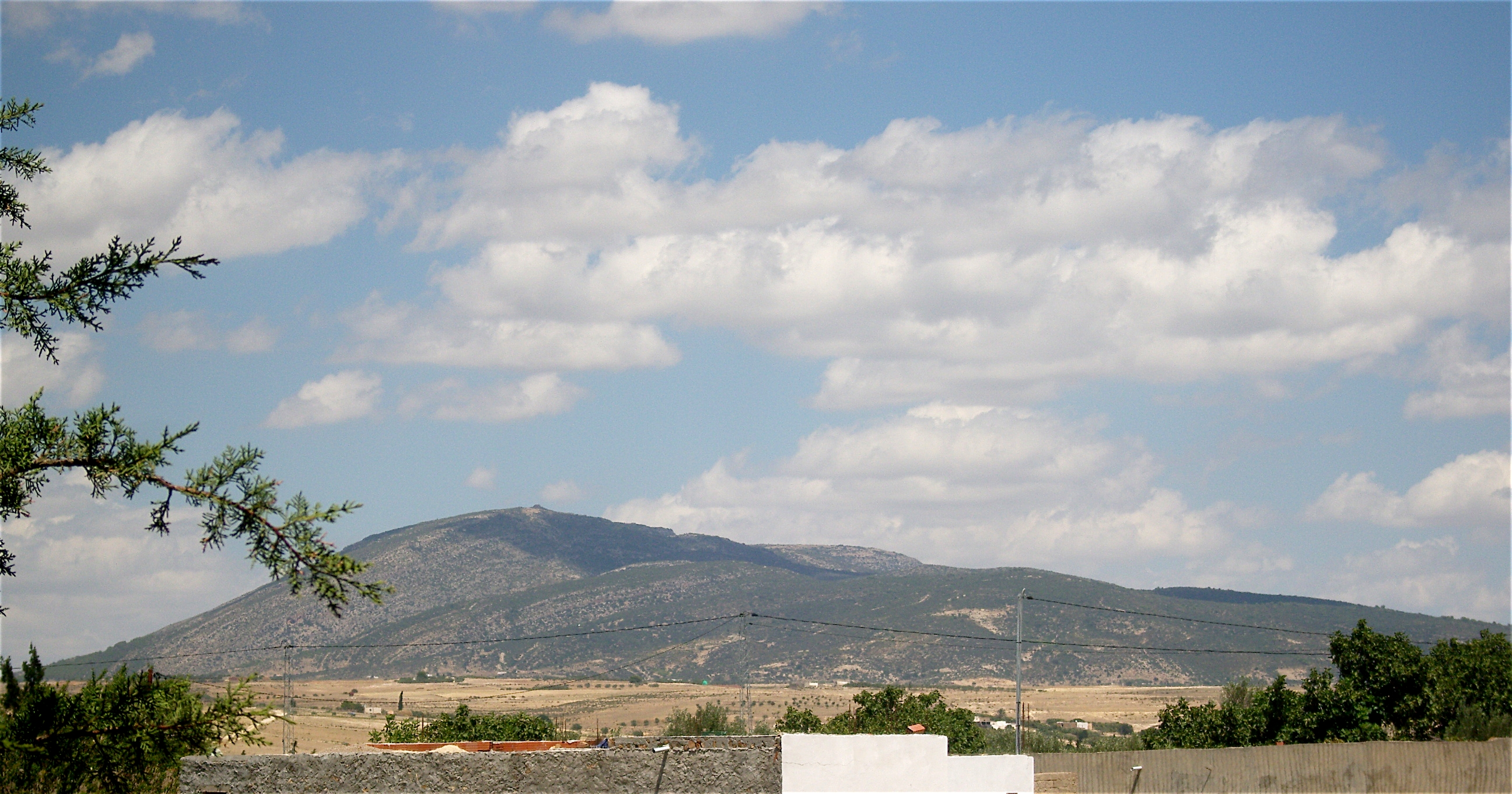
Djebel Bargou.

Jebel Bargou (جبل برقو) is a mountain (Jebel) of Tunisia, which rises to 1266m altitude.

== Location ==
map of Djebel Bargou topography.

Located at information 36°03'36" north, 9° 36'31" east in north-central region of Tunisia, about twenty kilometers southeast of the town of Siliana, it gives its name to the town situated on its northern side, a few kilometers from its peak.

It is part of mountain range forming the western axis of the northern half of the Tunisian dorsal. Traditionally it marks the border of the tribes of the confederation of Jlass in the region of Kairouan.
