= Encapsulation =

Encapsulation may refer to:

== Chemistry ==
- Molecular encapsulation, in chemistry, the confinement of an individual molecule within a larger molecule
- Micro-encapsulation, in material science, the coating of microscopic particles with another material

== Biology ==
- Cell encapsulation, technology made to overcome the existing problem of graft rejection in tissue engineering applications

== Computing and electronics ==
- An alternate term for conformal coating or potting, which protects electronic components
- Encapsulation (networking), the process of adding control information as it passes through the layered model
- Encapsulation (computer programming), the combination of program code and data, and/or restriction (hide) of access to data except through dedicated code
