= Gafsa =

City in Tunisia

Gafsa قفصة - ڨفصة
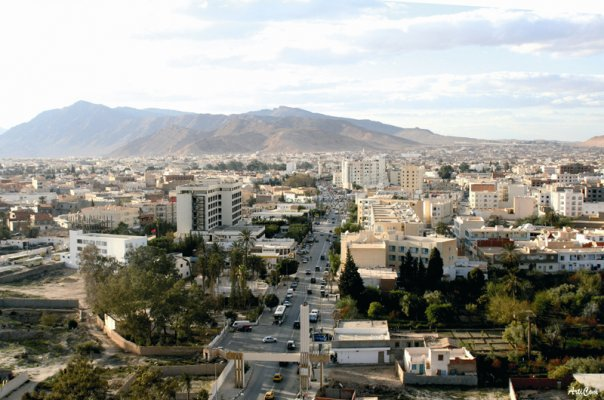

- Location in Tunisia
- Coordinates: 34°25′21″N 8°47′03″E
- Country: Tunisia
- Governorate: Gafsa Governorate
- Delegation(s): Gafsa North, Gafsa South

Government
  - Mayor: Helmi Belhani (Nidaa Tounes)

Population (2022)
  - Total: 120,739
- Time zone: UTC1 (CET)

Gafsa (Arabic: قفصة, romanized: qafṣah; Tunisian Arabic: ڨفصة, romanized: gafṣah; Gafsˤa) is the capital of Gafsa Governorate in Tunisia. With a population of 120,739, Gafsa is the ninth-largest Tunisian city and is 335 km from the country's capital, Tunis.

== Overview ==
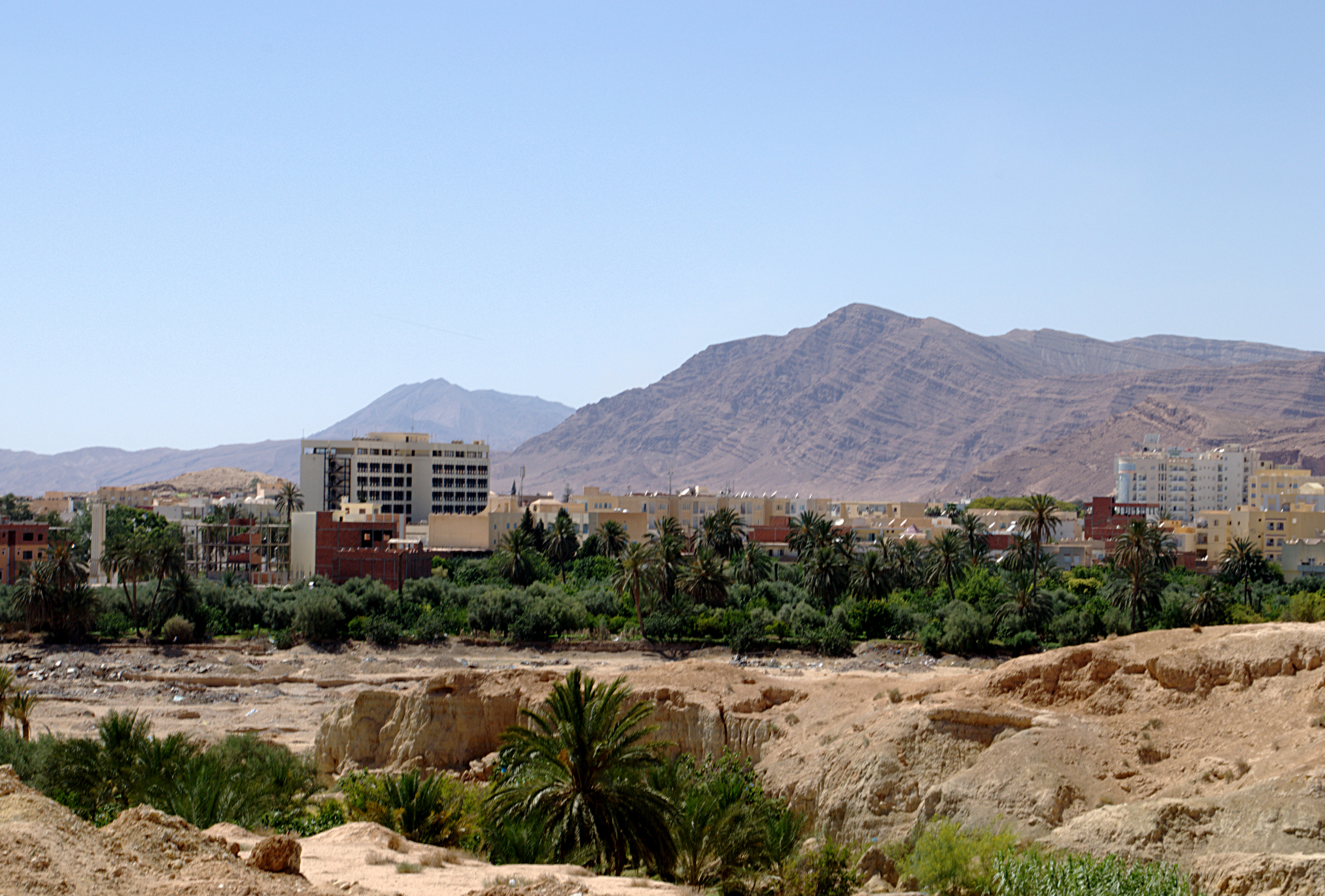
View of Gafsa

Gafsa is the capital of Gafsa Governorate, in southwestern Tunisia and is both a historical oasis and the home to the mining industry of Tunisia. The city had 111,170 inhabitants at the 2014 census, under the rule of the mayor, Helmi Belhani. Lying 369 km (229 mi) by road southwest of the country's capital, Tunis, Gafsa has its geographical coordinates 34°25′N 8°47′E.

== History ==
=== Ancient history ===
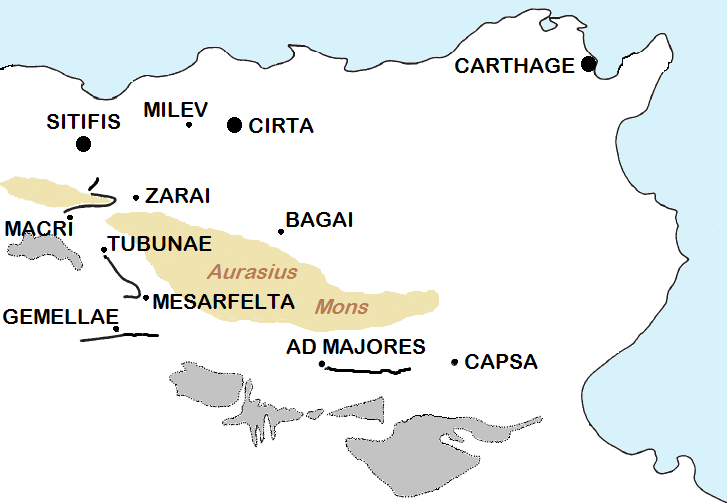
Capsa in Roman times was near the "limes romanus" called Fossatum Africae.

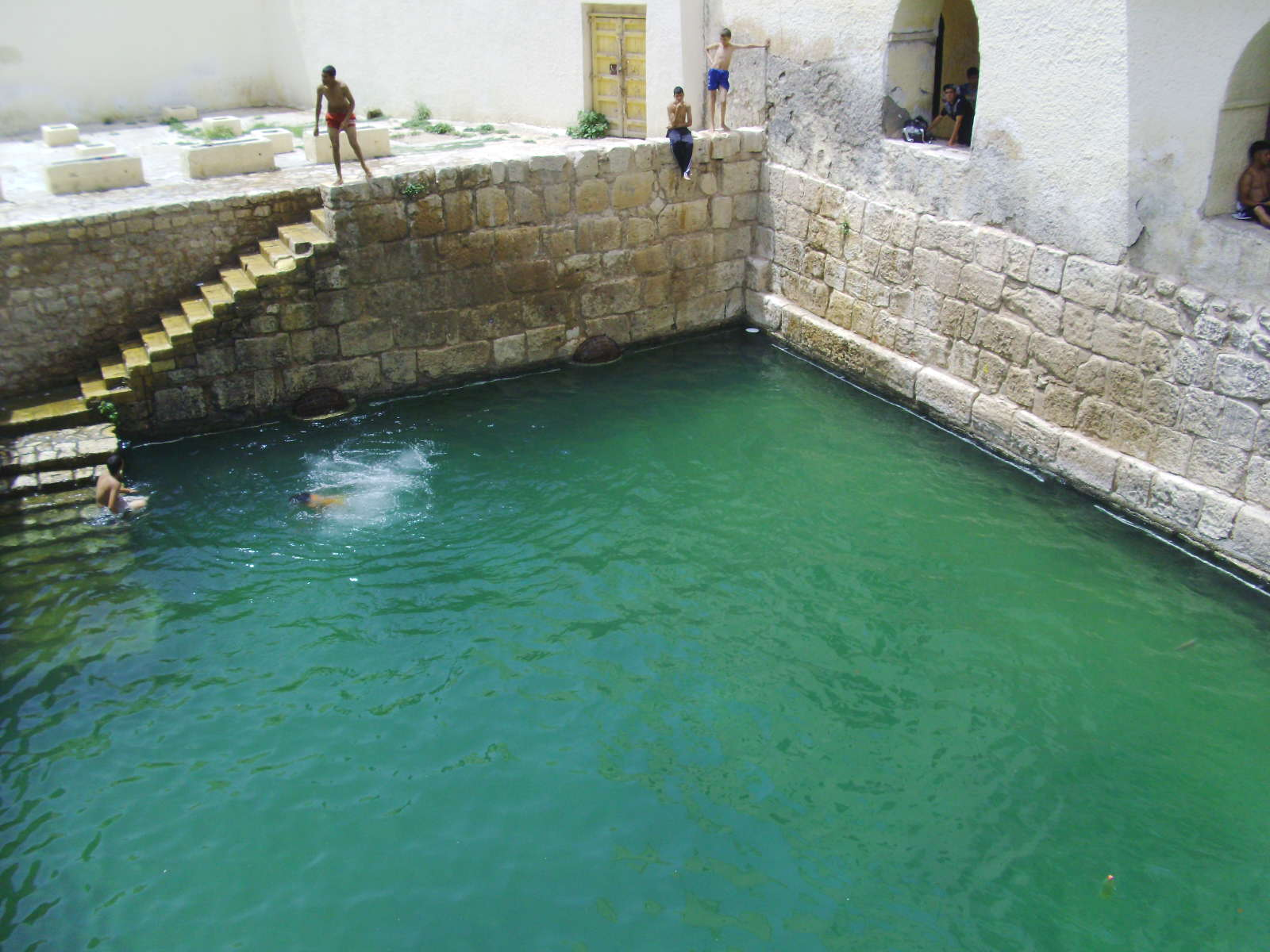
Roman baths of Gafsa.

Excavations at prehistoric sites in the Gafsa area have yielded artefacts and skeletal remains associated with the Capsian culture. This Mesolithic civilisation has been radiocarbon dated to between 10,000 and 6,000 BCE. The associated ancient population, known as the Snail eaters, are known for their extensive middens of snail shells. They are believed to be the ancestors of the modern Berbers.

The city was originally called Capsa in Latin. Gafsa lends its Latin name of Capsa to the Mesolithic Capsian culture. It belonged to King Jugurtha, who deposited his treasures there. It was captured by Gaius Marius in 106 BC and destroyed, later becoming reestablished under the Punic-style magistracy of sufetes before being granted the status of a Roman colonia. Capsa was an important city of Roman Africa near the Fossatum Africae. Roman cisterns are still evident in the city ruins.

The Vandals conquered the Roman city and ruled it until the death of Genseric (477). The Berbers then occupied it, making it the capital of a Romano-Berber kingdom until subjected to Byzantium under Justinian I (527–565) and the era of Byzantine North Africa. He made Capsa the capital of the province of Byzacena. The Duke of Byzacena resided there. In 540, the Byzantine governor general Solomon built a new city wall, naming the city Justiniana Capsa.

=== Arab conquest ===
The Arab army of Uqba ibn Nafi conquered Gafsa in 688, in spite of resistance from the Berbers. After the Arab conquest, Capsa started to lose importance, replaced by Muslim-founded Kairouan.

Historians such as Camps and Laverde consider Gafsa the place in North Africa where African Romance last survived, until the 13th century, as a spoken language. Al Yacoubi reports that this time its inhabitants were considered Romanized Berber and Al-Idrissi says they continued to speak an African Latin and part of them remained faithful to the Christian religion.

Al-Idrisi described the city in the 12th century:

The city of Gafsa is a fine city, surrounded by a wall, with a flowing river whose water is purer than that of Castile. At its center lies the spring known as al-Tarmīdh. It has bustling markets, abundant trade, and thriving industries. The city is encircled by numerous date palms, bearing remarkable varieties of dates. Gafsa is also adorned with beautiful gardens, orchards, and well-maintained palaces. Various crops are cultivated there, including henna and cotton. Its inhabitants are largely Berbers, and most of them speak the Latin-African tongue.

=== Recent history ===
Phosphate mines were discovered in 1886, and Gafsa today is home to one of the largest mines of phosphate in the world.

The travel-book ‘Fountains in the Sand’ (1912) by British author Norman Douglas gives an in-depth account of life and work in Gafsa.

In the Second World War, Gafsa suffered heavy bombardment from both the German and Italian side and the Allies. Part of its Kasbah was destroyed.

On 27 January 1980, a group of dissidents armed and trained by Libya occupied the city to contest the régime of Habib Bourguiba. 48 people were killed in the battles.

The Gafsa region has had an active political voice throughout its history, and various events there have shaped its political developments in the various phases of modern Tunisia.

In 2008, Gafsa was the center of riots directed against the government of President Zine El Abidine Ben Ali. The government was swift and brutal in its suppression of the uprising, but this movement has since been credited with sowing the first seeds of the Jasmine Revolution that removed Zine El Abidine Ben Ali from power three years later, igniting the Arab Spring across much of North Africa and the Middle East.

In 2014, a lake suddenly appeared around 25 kilometers from the town. The cause of the lake's formation is currently unknown.

== Bishopric ==
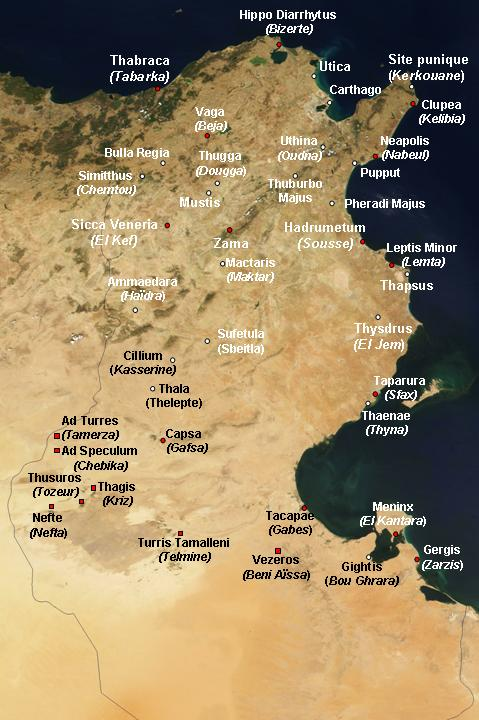
Map showing Capsa

Extant documents give the names of a few of the bishops of Capsa.

In the 3rd century, Donatulus took part in the council that Saint Cyprian convoked in Carthage in 256 to discuss the problem of the lapsi.

In the 4th century, at the Council of Carthage (349), Fortunatianus of Capsa was present, mentioned as the first among the bishops of Byzacena. A Donatist bishop of Capsa called Quintasius was at the council held at Cabarsussi in 393 by a breakaway group of Donatists led by Maximianus.

In the 5th century, at the joint Council of Carthage (411) attended by Catholics and Donatists, Gams and Morcelli say Capsa was represented by the Donatist Donatianus, and that it had no Catholic bishop. According to the more recent Mesnage, Donatianus was instead the Donatist bishop of Capsus in Numidia, and Capsa in Byzacena was represented by the Catholic Fortunatus and the Donatist Celer, whom the earlier sources attributed to Capsus. All three sources agree in attributing to Capsa the Vindemialis who was one of the Catholic bishops whom Huneric summoned to Carthage in 484 and then exiled. However, the latest editions of the Roman Martyrology, which commemorates Vindemialis on 2 May, call him bishop of Capsus in Numidia.

Capsa still had resident bishops at the end of the 9th century, being mentioned in a Notitia Episcopatuum of Leo VI the Wise (886–912). but a community may have lasted until the early 12th century

No longer a residential bishopric, Capsa is today listed by the Catholic Church as a titular see.

== Climate ==
Gafsa has a hot desert climate (Köppen climate classification BWh).

Climate data for Gafsa (1991–2020, extremes 1950–2022)
Month	Jan	Feb	Mar	Apr	May	Jun	Jul	Aug	Sep	Oct	Nov	Dec	Year
Record high °C (°F)	26.8 (80.2)	32.0 (89.6)	36.9 (98.4)	38.0 (100.4)	42.8 (109.0)	46.1 (115.0)	46.5 (115.7)	45.7 (114.3)	43.5 (110.3)	39.5 (103.1)	35.5 (95.9)	29.0 (84.2)	46.5 (115.7)
Mean daily maximum °C (°F)	15.8 (60.4)	17.5 (63.5)	21.3 (70.3)	25.4 (77.7)	30.3 (86.5)	35.3 (95.5)	38.4 (101.1)	37.9 (100.2)	32.9 (91.2)	27.8 (82.0)	21.2 (70.2)	16.6 (61.9)	26.7 (80.1)
Daily mean °C (°F)	10.0 (50.0)	11.4 (52.5)	14.9 (58.8)	18.6 (65.5)	23.2 (73.8)	27.8 (82.0)	30.7 (87.3)	30.6 (87.1)	26.7 (80.1)	21.7 (71.1)	15.4 (59.7)	11.0 (51.8)	20.2 (68.4)
Mean daily minimum °C (°F)	4.1 (39.4)	5.3 (41.5)	8.4 (47.1)	11.8 (53.2)	16.1 (61.0)	20.2 (68.4)	23.0 (73.4)	23.3 (73.9)	20.4 (68.7)	15.6 (60.1)	9.5 (49.1)	5.5 (41.9)	13.6 (56.5)
Record low °C (°F)	−5.5 (22.1)	−4.3 (24.3)	−2.1 (28.2)	1.8 (35.2)	6.0 (42.8)	9.1 (48.4)	13.8 (56.8)	15.1 (59.2)	10.3 (50.5)	2.6 (36.7)	−1.2 (29.8)	−4.9 (23.2)	−5.5 (22.1)
Average precipitation mm (inches)	15.1 (0.59)	10.6 (0.42)	15.7 (0.62)	16.4 (0.65)	13.4 (0.53)	3.4 (0.13)	3.4 (0.13)	5.9 (0.23)	20.2 (0.80)	18.0 (0.71)	18.2 (0.72)	13.7 (0.54)	154.1 (6.07)
Average precipitation days (≥ 1.0 mm)	2.2	2.1	2.4	2.3	2.1	0.7	0.5	0.8	2.5	2.5	2.0	2.4	22.5
Average relative humidity (%)	65	61	58	55	52	47	43	48	55	61	65	68	56
Mean monthly sunshine hours	201.2	214.9	246.4	268.9	311.4	333.3	359.5	331.4	261.8	243.2	214.4	200.6	3,187
Mean daily sunshine hours	6.6	7.6	7.9	8.9	9.9	10.8	11.5	10.9	9.4	8.2	7.4	6.7	8.8
Source 1: Institut National de la Météorologie (humidity 1961-1990, sun 1981–2010) (Note: The Station ID for Gafsa is 64545111.)
Source 2: NOAA(humidity and daily sun 1961–1990)

== Economy ==
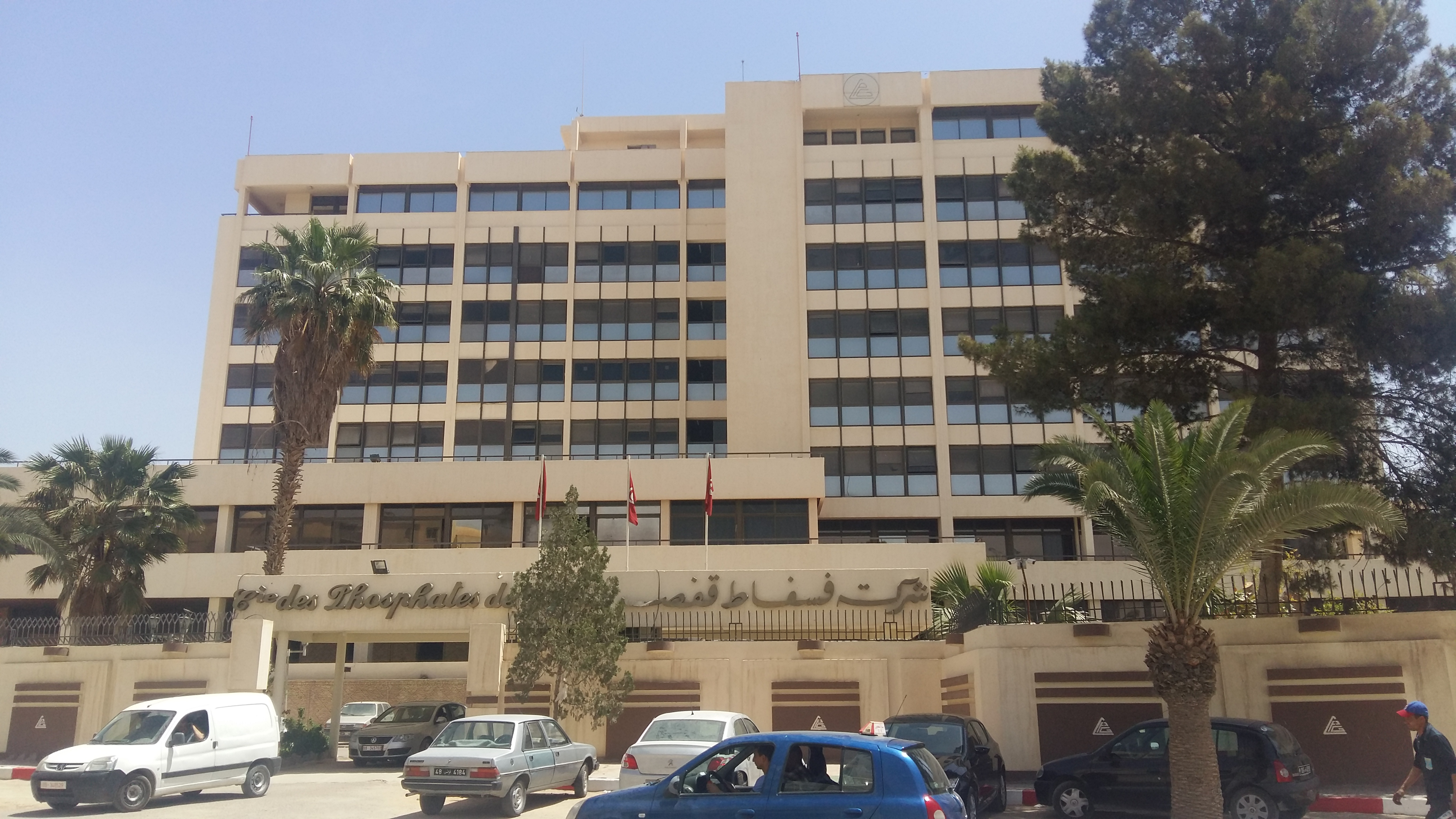
Companie des phosphates de Gafsa

Gafsa is developing thanks to the mining of phosphates, the deposit of which discovered in 1886 is one of the largest in the world. Tunisia extracted nearly five million tonnes of phosphates in 2011. Production fell after the revolution to reach 3,500,000 tonnes in 2016. Tunisia has thus fallen from seventh in the world to tenth. The Compagnie des phosphates de Gafsa had its own private railway line until 1966, on the basis of an agreement signed on 25 August 1896. Paradoxically, the city is quite poor and does not benefit from income from phosphate.

== Transport ==
Gafsa – Ksar International Airport is located in the city.

== Sport ==

El Kawafel Sportives de Gafsa (EGSG) is the main football club of Gafsa.

== Media ==
Radio stations:

- Radio Gafsa (governmental) | Frequencies : 87.8 FM, 93.5 FM and 91.8 FM,
- Mines FM or Sawt Elmanajem (private) | Frequencies : 90.9 FM

and other government and private Tunisian radios broadcast in Gafsa as Shems FM, RTCI, Youth Radio, Culture Radio, Zitouna, and the National Radio.

== International relations ==
=== Twin towns – Sister cities ===
Gafsa is twinned with:

- Naples, Italy
- Palma de Mallorca, Spain

== See also ==
- African Romance
- Capsian culture
