= Ghaba =

Cemetery in Sudan

- Approximate location of Ghaba in Sudan
- 16.67°N 33.4496°E
- Associated with: Central Sudanese Neolithic
- Location: Sudan

Site notes
- Excavation dates: 1980, 1985-1986
- Archaeologists: Yves Lecointe with the SFDAS

Ghaba is a Neolithic cemetery mound and African archaeological site located in Central Sudan in the Shendi region of the Nile Valley. The site, discovered in 1977 by the Section Française de la Direction des Antiquités du Soudan (SFDAS) while they were investigating nearby Kadada, dates to 4750–4350 and 4000–3650 cal BC. Archaeology of the site originally heavily emphasized pottery, as there were many intact or mostly intact vessels. Recent analysis has focused on study of plant material found, which indicates that Ghaba may have been domesticating cereals earlier than previously believed. Though the site is a cemetery, little analysis has taken place on the skeletons due to circumstances of the excavation and poor preservation due to the environment. The artifacts at Ghaba suggest the people who used the cemetery were part of a regionalization separating central Sudan's Neolithic from Nubia. While many traditions match with Nubia, the people represented at Ghaba had some of their own particular practices in food production and bead and pottery production, which likely occurred on a relatively small scale. They also had some distinct funerary traditions, as evidenced by their grave goods. The people at Ghaba would have likely existed at least partially in a trade network that spread through the Nile and to the Red Sea. They used agriculture, cultivation, and cattle for sustenance.

== Excavation ==
Ghaba was discovered in 1977 by the SFDAS led by Francis Geus during their investigations of another nearby Neolithic cemetery Kadada. The primary archaeologist was Yves Lecointe. The mound was 3 meters high and 3600 square meters in area. Investigators noted that the size of the mound had likely decreased significantly due to erosion. The first excavation at Ghaba was in 1980, and further investigation took place in 1985 and 1986. The mound was divided into four quarters. The northeast section was excavated thoroughly, and test trenches were made in the other three quadrants. Many of the graves were dangerously close to the surface, where they would be threatened by erosion. 328 total graves were excavated: 265 Neolithic graves, and 63 historic graves. The bones were described as poorly preserved, and most documentation and collection was of the teeth. There was no physical anthropologist involved in the excavations, so data pertaining to sex, age, and health is very limited or completely absent. Non-skeletal material collected was preserved much better, and have been restored and photographed extensively. The graves were documented, mapped, and drawn in detail. They recorded the materials found in the grave, and the orientations and positioning of the skeletons and other materials. They were able to use the recorded depths of the burials to make conclusions about seriation of the burials and also the pottery.

The skeletal material recovered are at the Research Centre in Evolutionary Anthropology and Palaeoecology in Liverpool, UK. The pottery recovered was restored and is now kept at the Khartoum National Museum.

== Grave goods ==
About 70% of the graves at Ghaba had goods associated with them that were discovered during the excavation. Many contained pottery (53.58% of total graves), but other items were shells, animal bones, bracelets, beads, pendants, palettes, grinders, malachite splinters, and a mace-head.

=== Pottery ===
During excavations, archaeologists recovered 311 complete or mostly complete pottery vessels. These bowls were mostly buried upside-down next to the heads of people, which is unusual, but has been recorded at other Neolithic sites such as Kadero in a few graves, and in one case each at Al Khiday 2 and Shaheineb. Some pots showed evidence that they had been repaired before burial, indicating they were not made specifically for funerary purposes, and were functional.

Recovered pots were handmade with coil technique and could be easily divided into groups based on shape. These shapes are beakers, bowls, jars, dishes, and spoons. Bowls were further broken down into types such as hemispherical, globular, conical, and composite. Jars were broken down into the types ovoid, globular, and biconical. Beakers were divided into types caliciform or cylindrical. Each type followed very similar patterns in shape. As the height changed, the width changed, and almost always in the same ratio. The shape was consistent even as they were smaller or larger. Of the most abundant category: bowls, the most common types are globular and then hemispheric.

Light brown or red surfaces of the pottery are most common. 48.39% of the vessels were decorated. Analysis of the decorations found 22 different types obtained via incision, impressions, and firing methods. There are also 7 distinct rim decoration patterns. Many of these decoration types can also be found at other Neolithic cemeteries in central Sudan and upper Nubia. The typological organization of the pottery assemblage based on shape, wall decoration, and rim decoration was used to seriate graves. The decorations covered the whole walls of the pottery which is characteristic of central Sudan. This is different than pottery in northern Sudan where decorations typically only cover the rim area.

The cylindrical beakers, of which they found 12 distinct vessels are unique to Ghaba, and not found in other assemblages associate with Neolithic Sudan. The majority of the vessel types or patterns can be linked to other Neolithic Sudanese cemeteries. For example, biconical jars at Ghaba are characterized by a red slip and black rim or semicircles. These vessels were found in graves in association with the few bucrania found. This jar shape and black semicircle decorated rim has also been found at ROM222, Shaheinab, and Kadero.

The clear categorization of pottery types at the early stages of occupation at Ghaba, suggests people moved into this region possibly from the Southern Dongola Reach (where R12 cemetery is located). The organized pottery production may also have served as a social tool, uniting people through migration and strengthening their identities. Most likely though, it means that the majority of pottery vessels were made by specialized potters, and not in individual households.

=== Body ornaments ===
The body ornaments found at Ghaba and other Neolithic sites are less complex in their design and made with raw materials sourced closer to them than their Nubian counterparts, which suggests a regionalization of culture. The presence of body ornaments indicates a complex social and economic system, as it requires organization of production likely by specific individuals.

==== Beads ====
Beads were found in 35 total graves.

31 graves contained stone beads. Archaeologists categorized these into 3 categories: cylindrical, barrel, and annular. The most common type was annular (56% of beads). The beads were mostly made up of chalcedony as carnelian or agate, but 3 were made of quartzite. Agate comes from gravels, which could have been found at the Umm Ruwaba Formation, or at even nearer gravels that have not yet been documented in a geological survey. The presence of carnelian is less certain, as it is much more rare than agate, not found in Sudan, and looks very similar to burnt agate. There is minimal archaeological evidence to make this conclusion, but one fact that supports the burnt agate theory is that there are very rare to find lithics for carnelian, but fairly common to find pebbles and debitage labeled carnelian. The raw materials found at Ghaba in the bead assemblages and at other sites in central Sudan are different than those found at Nubian sites, which can be explained by the geology of their physical location, but also the different modes of neolithization in these regions.

Accounts of the presence of amazonite beads are conflicting. Some texts say they were not present and some say they were found but very rare. The amazonite likely would have originated from Ethiopia, and was seen in large quantities at other Neolithic cemeteries such as R12 in northern Sudan, which suggests a North African trade network may have existed in the Neolithic.

Evidence for stone bead production comes from grave 38 Inferior at R12 with 13 unperforated bead blanks, and at Ghaba's grave 47 with 7 beads partially perforated on both sides. Researchers have proposed that to produce beads, makers would heat the raw material and then break off flakes to become beads. Which would then be perforated, possibly with a perforator inserted into an animal bone or a bow drill, on both sides. Then the bead would be smoothed into its rounded shape by hand abrading or rolling them on a grinding surface with while strung on a string. The process of perforating and/or smoothing the beads may have been aided by use of sand and water to create grit, though this technique is more attributed to cylindrical beads with vertical sides more common in Nubia. If the carnelian is actually burnt agate, then there would be additional heating steps to alter the color. This proposed method encompasses bead production in Neolithic Sudan as a whole, and is not unique to Ghaba or R12. This typology and production method of beads suggests that bead production came from an individual or a household and was non-utilitarian. The number of beads suggests that the bead production was only occurring part-time. The presence of only a small portion of beads in graves at Ghaba and other Neolithic Sudanese cemeteries suggests they were symbolic and valuable - not accessible for everyone.

Presence of sea shell beads like Engina mendicaria and Nerita species may further indicate an existing trade route between the Nile Valley in Sudan and the Red Sea. Engina mendicaria beads were found in 2 graves, with 14 in one and 3 in another. This species of shell as beads were valuable in the Neolithic Persian Gulf. Four Nerita beads were found in one grave. It cannot be determined what species exactly was found, but there are three species of Nerita known in the Red Sea.

==== Lip plugs ====
Lip plugs are considered to be symbolic, aesthetic, and important to peoples identities in many cultures across space and time. In the Nile valley they are mostly only found in Sudan. At Ghaba 7 lip plugs were found in 6 graves. Three of those lip plugs were found in one grave, where they were found close to the mandible as if they were placed under the lower lip. The lip plugs were made of stone, quartz, and zeolite, except one made of ivory or bone. These were described as having two shapes, the first being "stud-like" which were long, thin, and pointed, and the second being mushroom like which were shorter, wider, and rounder. In one case, the lip plug in a grave was stained green with malachite placed in the mouth. This was used as evidence that the malachite staining was done post-mortem.

==== Stone pendants ====
Ten total pendants were found in 7 graves. The raw materials and shapes were variable - made from rhyolite and quartz for example, and in teardrop shapes (most frequently), rectangles, and circles, among others.

==== Ivory bracelets ====
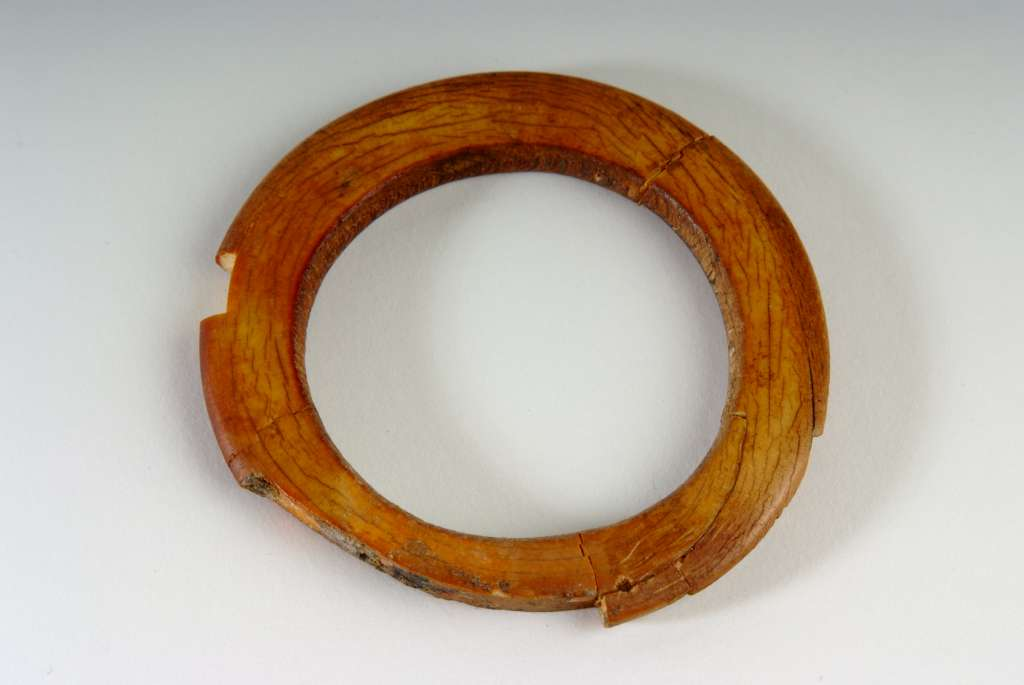
This is an example of an ivory bracelet like those at Ghaba.

Ivory bracelets were found in 12 graves at Ghaba, with a much larger quantity in some than in others. Cementum left on a few of these bracelets implies they came from elephants. There is little evidence of elephants being killed in the Neolithic, and very little is known about how the ivory would have been processed, but it is suggested that it does not require particular skill. The ivory at this site implies that these people may have at a small scale been hunting elephants, and that they would have had the tools required for that skill.

=== Lithics ===
Lithics at Ghaba were found in graves covering the entire occupation, indicating that the lithics played a consistent role in the lives of the people here. In total there were 39 lithic samples found at Ghaba in 17 graves, and 15 of them were in Grave 10. Grave 10 had 4 scraper tools, and 7 flat oval quartzite pebbles. In total, Ghaba had 9 tools, one blade, and a number of cores, flakes, and chunks. Most lithics were made of flint or quartzite, but two were made of rhyolite. Quartz would have most likely come from the riverbed. Most of the cores were quartzite, and most of the flakes were flint. The blade was hyaline quartzite and the edges were intentionally worn down. The tools were scrapers, one flint knife, and one backed knife. The flint knife is not characteristic of the Neolithic in central Sudan or Nubia. This knife's careful construction using high quality flint not known in Sudan suggests it may have been imported. The backed knife also made of flint has a slight tang which may have been functional to insert into a handle.

The assemblage as a whole at Ghaba was relatively small, and cannot be interpreted together very accurately. It seems though that Ghaba fits into the typical lithic production that took place in Neolithic Sudan.

=== Bone tools ===
A number of Bovine bone fragments were found at Ghaba. Bone tools were characteristic of Neolithic Sudan and not unique to this site. Because of the very poor preservation of bone in general, very little can be interpreted from these, though a few specific tools have been identified. These include a perforator, a comb, and spatulas. Bone tools were likely used for many other things not preserved or not recorded in the funerary context.

=== Palettes ===
Palettes are common grave goods in Neolithic Sudan. At Ghaba they were mostly made of granite and sandstone, and the shapes were not very uniform. They feature a smooth concave side, and a rougher convex bottom. In many cases, the smooth side of the palette had traces of red ochre which likely would have been used for cosmetics or painting the body. Sandstone palettes most likely ground ochre for pigments, while granite was likely used to grind malachite for pigment.

=== Grinding stones ===
Ghaba excavations revealed grinding stones and sandstone grinders. These types of tools are characteristic of grinding cereals, but may have been used for other things like polishers for tools. Six grinding stones here are attributed indirectly to plant processing.

== Biological features ==
=== Malachite ===
A unique feature of a few skeletons were teeth stained with malachite, and some graves contained malachite splinters or chunks without teeth stains. 24.15% of total graves had malachite coloration, and 7.14% had splinters or chips, though they were not found to be associated with a particular cluster in the cemetery. The presence of malachite has been identified as a post-mortem addition. Malachite power and splinters have been found to much lesser extents at other Neolithic cemeteries such as R12 and Gebel Ramlah, but the coloration on the teeth is unique in the archaeological record to Ghaba. The use of malachite in cemeteries in Nubia and Sudan have suggested that malachite was considered important in these societies. Some have suggested the malachite used at Ghaba was found on the Red Sea coast in Africa.

=== White powder ===
In about 15% of total graves, they found a thin layer of white power under the skulls as "pillows". Though originally believed to be remains of animal skins, this powder was analyzed and determined to be plant material laid as vegetal pillows. This material is possibly evidence of cereal domestication and processing during the early Neolithic in the Nile Valley.

=== Ochre ===
12.45% of total individuals were found to have red or yellow partial coloration on the bone, contributed to ochre power in the burial bed during the funerary process. There were also chunks of ochre or ochre power found in graves but not on bones. This was not seen in any particular clusters, but spread seemingly randomly through the cemetery. This feature is documented at other Neolithic cemeteries such as R12 to a larger extent, and Kadada and Kadero to a lesser extent. Although the bones were not completely covered in the ochre, some have suggested that considering the poor skeletal preservation, the bodies of the deceased may have been completely covered in ochre as part of funerary ritual

=== Bucrania ===
Bucrania, or cattle skulls, were found in eight graves at Ghaba, dating to the early occupation and occurring mostly in a particular cluster. Bucrania are common in Neolithic cemeteries in Sudan, but are most prevalent in Nubian neolithic cemeteries like at R12 or Kerma. The few occurrences at Ghaba are a unique trait. Seven of the graves were clustered in one corner of the excavated north-eastern quadrant. The lone bucrania found was found in the south-western corner of the same quadrant. It has been suggested that perhaps the cluster and lone bucrania were part of larger clusters that would be found in the nearby unexcavated quadrants, though this has yet to be investigated. Seven out of 8 of these graves also shared specific grave goods, specifically the biconical jars with red slip and black semicircle decorated rims also only found from this time period. This evidence suggests that cattle herding was a specialty that only a minority participated in, and that cattle herding or pastoralism was not as important to the culture of the people who were buried at Ghaba or in the Early and Middle Neolithic in Sudan as previously suggested.

=== Shells ===
Non-sea shells were much more common than the few sea shells found perforated as beads. Chambardia shells, a type of freshwater riverine bivalve were found in 33 graves, sometimes in quantities up to 14 in one grave. These shells have many possible uses which have been observed at other Neolithic Nile valley sites. They could have been containers, or tools for scooping or spooning. In a number of other sites, these shells were manipulated to be hooks, spoons, and jewelry, so it was common to use these shells in this region at this time. These shells have also been seen as far away as Palestine, which is indicative of possible trade and/or travel by the Neolithic Nile Valley to Palestine. At later sites, these shells have been found up to 500km away in other regions of North Africa, Cyprus, and in the Aegean Sea. The great distance some of these shells traveled indicates they were valuable.

== Plant analysis ==
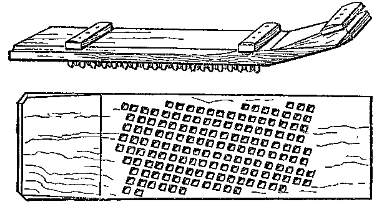
This is an example of a threshing sledge used in Ancient Syria. A similar tool was likely used at Ghaba to collect agricultural grasses.

Analysis of starch from dental calculus and the white power determined to be opal silica phytoliths left under skulls determined that Ghaba was dominated by C4 grasses like millets. Particularly, they found plants of the Paniceae family or panicoids, which are local, wild grasses, to be most dominant. The panicoids were directly dated, but the taxa found can not be used to determine whether they were domesticated or wild. Analysis showed a significant contribution from wild grasses, and small amounts of wheat and barley. Microscopic analysis of the panicoid silica skeletons showed irregular cell shapes in about half the cells, which some suggest may be evidence for cereal processing. The straight edges are similar to cuts on domesticated grasses harvested on a large scale by a threshing sledge, as observed in ethnographic research in the Middle East and Spain. Dental calculus is mineralized dental plaque that preserves information about what a person eats during their lives. The dental calculus specifically suggested consumption of wheat and barley, large millets, and legumes such as hyacinth bean, and cowpea, these being wild and domesticated plants, meaning they plants were not only used for funerary purposes but for regular consumption. The presence of the powdery deposits in the "pillow" under the skulls indicates there may have been a symbolic value to these plants.

This evidence supports agriculturalism as a part of a mixed subsistence system with agriculture, cultivation, and stockbreeding in the early Neolithic Nile River Valley, as opposed to the long held and archaeologically supported belief that this period and location was strictly pastoral. The evidence from Ghaba as well as R12 cemetery push the date of first use of domesticated cereals from southwest Asia in this region from about 6500 to 7000BP.

== Dental analysis ==
1.7% of individuals had dental caries, indicating a mostly non agricultural diet, and low carb intake, despite evidence for agriculture in the form of the white powder in some graves. 1.7% of individuals also showed enamel hypoplasia, which is an indicator of chronic childhood stress, meaning the severe stress was uncommon at Ghaba. These dental patterns show the people at Ghaba had good dental health, which may further be indicative of overall good health.

Analysis of dental traits at many Neolithic Sudanese sites shows Ghaba fits in particularly well with upper Nubian dentition like in Al Khiday. This indicates a biological origin in Upper Nubia, most likely with Mesolithic Al Khiday.
