= Gebel Ramlah =

Archaeological site in Egypt

- Gebel Ramlah
- 22.710278°N 30.504722°E
- Location: Egypt

Gebel Ramlah is a region in the Western Desert of southern Egypt that was occupied throughout the African Pastoral Neolithic. Archaeological research has focused primarily on individual burial sites and six pastoral cemeteries, including the earliest known infant cemetery in the world. The Gebel Ramlah cemeteries were active during the Final Neolithic in the fifth millennium BC. Ongoing excavation has uncovered over 200 human burials and elaborate grave goods. Research studies have been done on the pottery, mollusk shells, archaeobotanical remains, and skeletal remains found throughout the sites.

== Excavation ==
Archaeological excavation began at Gebel Ramlah in 2001, under the Combined Prehistoric Expedition (CPE) group, which has done archaeological work throughout the south Western Desert in Egypt since the 1970s. CPE was founded by Fred Wendorf, and since his retirement has been directed by Romuald Schild. Both have been involved in archaeological work at Gebel Ramlah and directly associated sites in the region.

Gebel Ramlah was first discovered in 2000 by polish archaeologist Michał Kobusiewicz, and excavation of the first three cemeteries was done in 2001 and 2003. The excavations were led by Kobusiewicz, alongside fellow archaeologists Jacek Kabacinski and Joel D. Irish. These cemeteries were the first Neolithic cemeteries found in the Western Desert, and thus the earliest known in the region. They are known by their site names E-01-2, E-03-1 and E-03-2.

In 2008, the signs of another cemetery were spotted by archaeologist Marta Osypinska. The location was excavated during a 2009 CPE field season, by Agnieszka Czekaj-Zastawny and Jacek Kabacinski. It was confirmed to be another cemetery, site E-09-4. Two other cemeteries were also excavated during this 2009 field season at Gebel Ramlah, both under the site name E-09-02 (one of these being the unique Gebel Ramlah infant cemetery). These too were discovered and excavated by Agnieszka Czekaj-Zastawny and Jacek Kabaciński and their CPE team.

Excavation of various individual burial sites and habitation sites from throughout the Neolithic have also been excavated by CPE teams at Gebel Ramlah since its discovery, but research and publication on these sites is limited. One habitation site was excavated alongside the associated cemetery sites in 2001.

== Environment ==
Archaeologists working at Gebel Ramlah and other Western Desert sites use a four period system to categorize the human occupations of the region during the African Humid Period. Geological research has found evidence for unique climatic and environmental variations within each of these humid phases, as well as dry periods between them.

1. Early Neolithic - ca. 9300-6150 BC
2. Middle Neolithic - ca. 6050-5550 BC
3. Late Neolithic - ca. 5500-4650 BC
4. Final Neolithic - ca. 4600-3600 BC

Gebel Ramlah, or "sandy mountain", is located in the south of Egypt's Western Desert, near the Sudanese border. It is a 100 meter high hill, overlooking a playa directly to its south. During the intermittent humid periods of the African Neolithic, the desert playa was filled with water and fostered a lush savanna landscape. Human occupation at Gebel Ramlah revolved around this paleo-lake. Evidence of habitation on the edges of the paleo-lake suggest that human settlements relied on the lake and its resources throughout the Neolithic. These individuals were responsible for the extensive burials of Gebel Ramlah, with all of its known burial and cemetery sites within a kilometer of the lake shore. Dating of some material from the most recent upper levels of settlement areas matches the Final Neolithic timeline of the cemeteries.

Stratigraphic and geologic studies in the Gebel Ramlah playa indicate that around 6050 BC (marking the start of the Middle Neolithic), a major climatic shift left the regional landscape semi-desertified. Bodies of water were shrinking, and vegetation suffered. Therefore, people could no longer rely solely on hunting and intensive gathering for subsistence. It was at this point that pastoralism was likely adopted as a widespread means for subsistence in the playa region. This semi-arid climate continued until the end of the Final Neolithic in the region, at which point intensifying desertification drove inhabitants out.

== Early, Middle, and Late Neolithic occupation ==
Archaeology throughout in the Western Desert shows a wide span of Neolithic occupation, such as in Nabta Playa where early occupation dates back to 7500 BC. Nabta Playa is just 20 kilometers northwest of Gebel Ramlah, and findings from the two regions are often compared. At Gebel Ramlah, the earliest known burials have been dated to the late Early Neolithic, around 6500 BC. Burials dated to the Middle and Late Neolithic are scattered throughout the area as well. These are individual burials or sometimes burial clusters, predating the use of large-scale cemeteries in the region.

An extensive lithic refitting was done with a collection of 190 associate lithic artifacts found on the surface near the infant cemetery of site E-09-4. Because all of the flakes and tools produced in this knapping were found together with the core, archaeologists hypothesize that the tools were made for practice or training, not to be used. The tool styles and knapping processes evident in these refits are associated with Late Neolithic technology, designated by extensive flake production and retouched flake tools.

== Final Neolithic occupation ==
It is thought that the Bunat El Asnan people of the Gebel Ramlah region were trans-huming pastoralists. During the wet season they traveled to uplands where they could graze their cattle, while during the dry season they lived in permanent settlements on the paleo-lake. These individuals were some of the last to inhabit the Western Desert before drought and desertification finally intensified enough to drive them out. Some travelled up the Nile into northern Africa, potentially setting the stage for Ancient Egyptian civilizations. There are cultural elements found in the Final Neolithic of Gebel Ramlah which overlap with or are potential precursors for Ancient Egyptian elements, such as astronomical knowledge and the production of amulets. Additionally, it has been argued that the evidence for passive burial conservation in Gebel Ramlah cemeteries could be a precursor for Ancient Egyptian mummification, perhaps being based in similar protective beliefs.

== Cemeteries and burial practices ==
=== E-01-2, E-03-1 and E-03-2 ===
The first three Final Neolithic cemetery sites discovered at Gebel Ramlah were excavated in 2001 and 2003, and are known by their site names E-01-2, E-03-1 and E-03-2. These cemeteries, all very similar, are within a few meters of one another. Altogether they contain 69 individuals, some buried individually and some in group graves. There are more than double the number of women than there are men, possibly because as herders men were more likely to die far from the settlement protecting their animals. Additionally, 22% of the individuals are children, including neonates. Archaeologists have interpreted these cemeteries as being used by extended families, those Final Neolithic trans-humanist groups with settlements on the edges of the paleo-lake. It is hypothesized that group graves within the cemeteries were used by direct family units. The diversity of individuals throughout the cemeteries indicates a lack of social differentiation. There was no bias between men, women, and children in terms of quantity and quality of associated grave goods. All burials are tightly clustered, with each cemetery being under ten meters across.

A specific burial style was employed in these cemeteries. Individuals were placed on their right side facing south, with the knees bent and the hands positioned over the face. They were buried in oval pits, and outlines within the pits indicate that they were once lined with some sort of woven, basket-like material. In some instances, secondary inhumations are present in the cemeteries as well, where disarticulated skeletal remains were brought in from elsewhere and placed in a common grave. 896 artifacts and grave goods were found associated with the burials. These include flint and agate tools, stone objects, abundant and diverse jewelry items (beads, bracelets, pendants, amulets), sheets of mica, stone palettes, bone tools and needles, shells, pottery (including intricate caliciform beakers), ochre, and ochre containers.

The close proximity of burials throughout the cemeteries meant that older remains were often disturbed when new individuals were being buried. In these cases, some remains were found to be disturbed or incomplete. However, there is also compelling evidence of attempts to preserve the skeletal remains within these disturbed burials. For example, there are individuals whose teeth were found backwards, out of order, and even carefully placed in an eye socket or nasal cavity. They were likely put back into the older, skeletonized skulls after being upset in later grave-digging. In another case, an individual's own radius and ulna were inserted between their humerus and bracelets, to keep the jewelry in place after apparent disruption. These instances show an effort to ensure that remains and burial features were kept complete and together, likely indicated a significance of the human body's integrity in and after death.

The remains of one male individual in this cemetery group showed signs of great physical strain that indicates bending and lifting heavy objects. This type of skeletal stress is different than what results from herding, and thus what is typically seen in the remains of pastoralist Gebel Ramlah men. Archaeologists theorize that this individual may have taken part in the construction of Saharan megalithic structures erected nearby during the Final Neolithic.

=== E-09-4 ===
Around 600 meters from the previously described cemeteries, cemetery E-09-4 was discovered in 2008. Artifacts clustered on the surface were indicative of established Gebel Ramlah Final Neolithic burial practices, including a stone palette, red ochre, and modified shells from the Red Sea. Further research and excavation in 2009 showed that the cemetery was extremely poorly preserved. Although no human bones preserved, the presence of said burial-related artifacts and remnants of ovular grave pits allowed two graves to be confirmed, with likely evidence for multiple others.

=== E-09-02 ===
Site E-09-02 is a burial complex containing two cemeteries, both discovered by archaeologists in 2009. The larger of the two was used for the majority of adults, juveniles, and children older than three. The second, however, was an exclusively "infant" cemetery. Most of these individuals were newborns who died during or shortly after birth, though any children under three were also buried here. These cemeteries were likely used simultaneously by one Gebel Ramlah group, as burial practices were similar and radiocarbon dating shows use at the same time (between 4500 and 4300 BC). The infant cemetery has been the main focus of publication on site E-09-02. There are various cases around the world of early infant inhumation, but the presence of an entire cemetery set aside for infants, this early, is unique.

The adult cemetery contains at least 60 individuals. In comparison, the infant cemetery has 39 individuals, within 32 graves. Although mostly infants, there are two adults and one juvenile (around 14 years old) as well, each buried alongside an infant. One of the adults and the juvenile were both confirmed to be female, while the other adult was unidentifiable. It is likely that these individuals are mothers who died in or shortly after childbirth, along with their child. Like the previously described cemeteries, these burials are tightly packed. In the infant cemetery, all 32 graves are packed within a space of six meters by eight meters. The infant remains were often in fairly poor condition, due to exposure as well as the delicacy of infant bones in general. This limits aDNA study and exact aging of the remains. Additionally, research is limited by a lack of artifacts. Unlike in the previously described cemeteries, grave goods are fairly uncommon. Red ochre was present in most graves, but other than this there were only a few scattered shells (from the Nile and Red Sea), one hippopotamus ivory bracelet, 3 pieces of limonite and one piece of malachite.

Archaeologists suspect that the individuals who used the E-09-04 burial complex were culturally distinct from those using the previously described cemeteries, and though likely pastoralists as well, were not as mobile and spent more time at Gebel Ramlah. This is evidenced by the fact that all of the infants remains are primary burials, meaning the remains were immediately buried there and not transferred from elsewhere later after death. This detail has led archaeologists to hypothesize that women and children lived permanently at the Gebel Ramlah settlements, while men traveled in seasonal, trans-humanist pastoralism patterns. Some mobility is further suggested by certain exotic items used as grave goods, such as shells from the Nile River and Red Sea.

Several infant remains showed signs of burning. This burning of the deceased was likely intentional, with the remains being placed into pits that contained burning fires before being fully buried and covered. However, archaeologists have been unable to determine why this was done.

== Pottery ==
With its large and unusual cemetery sites, Gebel Ramlah is beneficial to archaeologists in understanding the use of funerary pottery within the Neolithic Western Desert region. However, some limitations are found in the relatively small amount of pottery excavated from the burial sites. An analysis of Gebel Ramlah's pottery assemblage was done by Maria C. Gatto.

=== Production ===
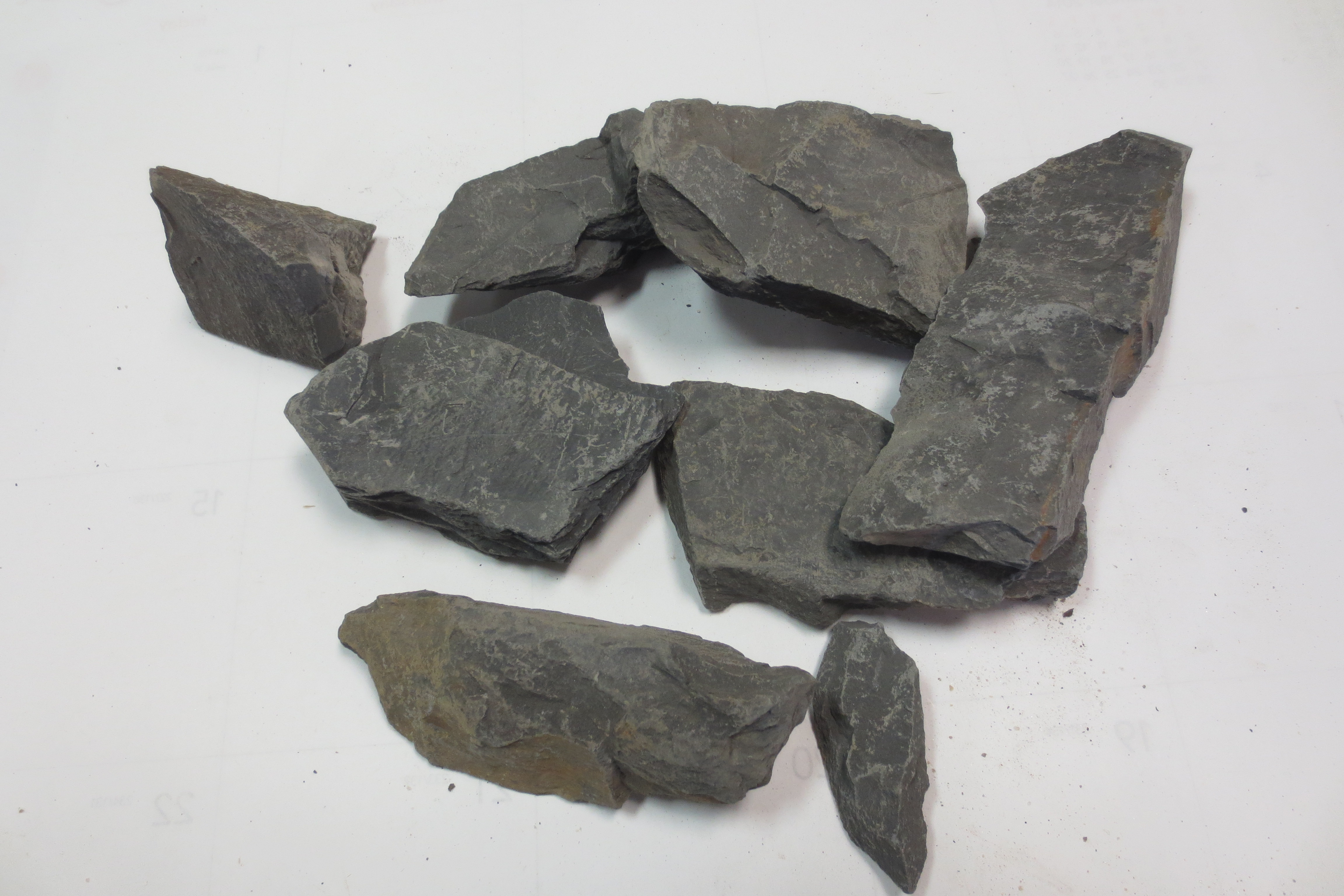
Shale

It appears that temper wasn't intentionally added to the clay, which was also common practice in early Nubian and Egyptian ceramics. The high quality of local clay made temper unnecessary. Small sand particles and occasional shale fragments were likely already in the clay when it was collected. Clay is present within some nearby hills (including Gebel Ramlah itself), as are sand and shale similar to those found in the ceramics. Thus, Gatto hypothesizes that the pottery was made within or nearby Gebel Ramlah. Considering the consistent water supply needed for pottery work, this is potentially significant. During the Final Neolithic when this production was occurring, we know that the Gebel Ramlah paleo-lake was drying up and water was most likely becoming more limited.

Erosion on the pottery made certain analyses of shaping and design difficult, but comparative study has led archaeologists to believe that coiling and pinching techniques were used to form the vessels found at Gebel Ramlah, with potential paddle and anvil methods as well. The works were typically either smoothed or burnished. Some seem to have been coated with a thin layer of clay around the rim after being shaped, creating a black-topped outer layer once the vessel was fired.

=== Decoration ===
The most elaborate vessels found at Gebel Ramlah's burial sites are large, tulip-shaped (or caliciform) beakers, with wide flared rims. The beakers are typically decorated with geometric patterns, such as curved bands, triangles, and diamonds. Ripple and zigzag textures are commonly seen within these shapes. The caliciform beakers, as well as the black-topped ware discussed previously, are specifically characteristic of the later Egyptian Badarian culture, possibly indicating a connection. However, similar caliciform beakers have been discovered throughout Egypt and from various Neolithic phases.

Only around a fourth of the vessels found within Gebel Ramlah burial sites were caliciform beakers, produced specifically as funerary pieces. The rest were offerings that originally had a utilitarian purpose (mend holes indicate their previous use). These vessels include pots, bowls, jars, and cups. Many were medium-sized bowls- often more simply constructed than the elaborate funerary beakers. Notably, over half of the pre-used vessels were still decorated, typically with a ripple pattern. Gatto hypothesizes that perhaps decorated vessels held a greater significance and were more likely to be selected as funerary offerings. In different Gebel Ramlah cemetery sites, however, the percentages of funerary pieces, pre-used pieces, and decorated pieces differ.

=== Spatial differences ===
Groupings of burials within various cemeteries can be attributed to family units within the large extended family that populated Gebel Ramlah. Thus, Gatto hypothesizes that spatial groupings of different pottery styles could be connected to the unique preferences and traditions of different families.

=== Regional comparisons ===
Some of the intricate shapes and designs of Final Neolithic pottery at Gebel Ramlah differ greatly from even Late Neolithic productions of the region just before. In fact, pieces like the ripple-decorated caliciform beakers most closely resemble Nubian pottery. Gatto hypothesizes that, perhaps, individuals from farther out in the Nubian Nile valley were moving toward Gebel Ramlah and surrounding regions (where water sources were slightly more reliable) as water dwindled during the Final Neolithic. If true, these individuals may have introduced Gebel Ramlah populations to their own pottery styles and techniques (and vice versa).

Comparison with better studied Late and Final Neolithic sites in Nubia and upper Egypt also help to supplement for the minimal testing done on Gebel Ramlah Pottery. The analysis of pottery from sites such as Nabta Playa helped to form hypotheses concerning the impacts of different firing temperatures on the unique local clay used in these ceramics, as well as the formation of features such as the previously described black-topped layer.

== Mollusk shell artifacts ==
A zooarchaeological study was done by Aldona Kurzawska to identify the mollusk shells used as various grave goods in the originally excavated cemeteries, sites E-01-2, E-03-1 and E-03-2. 142 shell artifacts were present throughout the burials (with no gifting discrimination by age or gender). Some whole and partial unmodified shells were present, while others had been shaped into bangles, beads, pendants, and nose plugs. Kurzawska separates the assemblage into its identifiable gastropods and bivalves, as well as unidentifiable artifacts. Occasionally, shells throughout these categories were found still coated with ceremonial red ochre.

Publications on more recently excavated Gebel Ramlah cemeteries also occasionally make mention of mollusk shell artifacts.

=== Gastropods ===
Within the assemblage, Kurzawska found evidence of Lambis truncata sebae, Cypraea pantherina, and genus Nerita (likely Nerita orbignyana and Nerita sanguinolenta). Various individuals of these different species were found covered with a layer of ochre colorant. All are species originating in the Red Sea. This is most likely evidence of trading systems within Gebel Ramlah society, in this case as far as the Red Sea coast. According to Kurzawska, it could also indicate direct mobility to these regions by Gebel Ramlah inhabitants.

Nerita orbignyana and Nerita sanguinolenta are two species of common name "nerite". The Nerita sp. individuals were used as beads, with holes drilled in the small gastropod shells. Of the 57 specimens throughout the burials, 51 were found together, near the skull of an individual in cemetery E-01-2. Thus it is likely these beads originally were associated within a jewelry piece, possibly a necklace. A specimen of drilled Nerita sp. was also cited in the infant cemetery at site E-09-02.

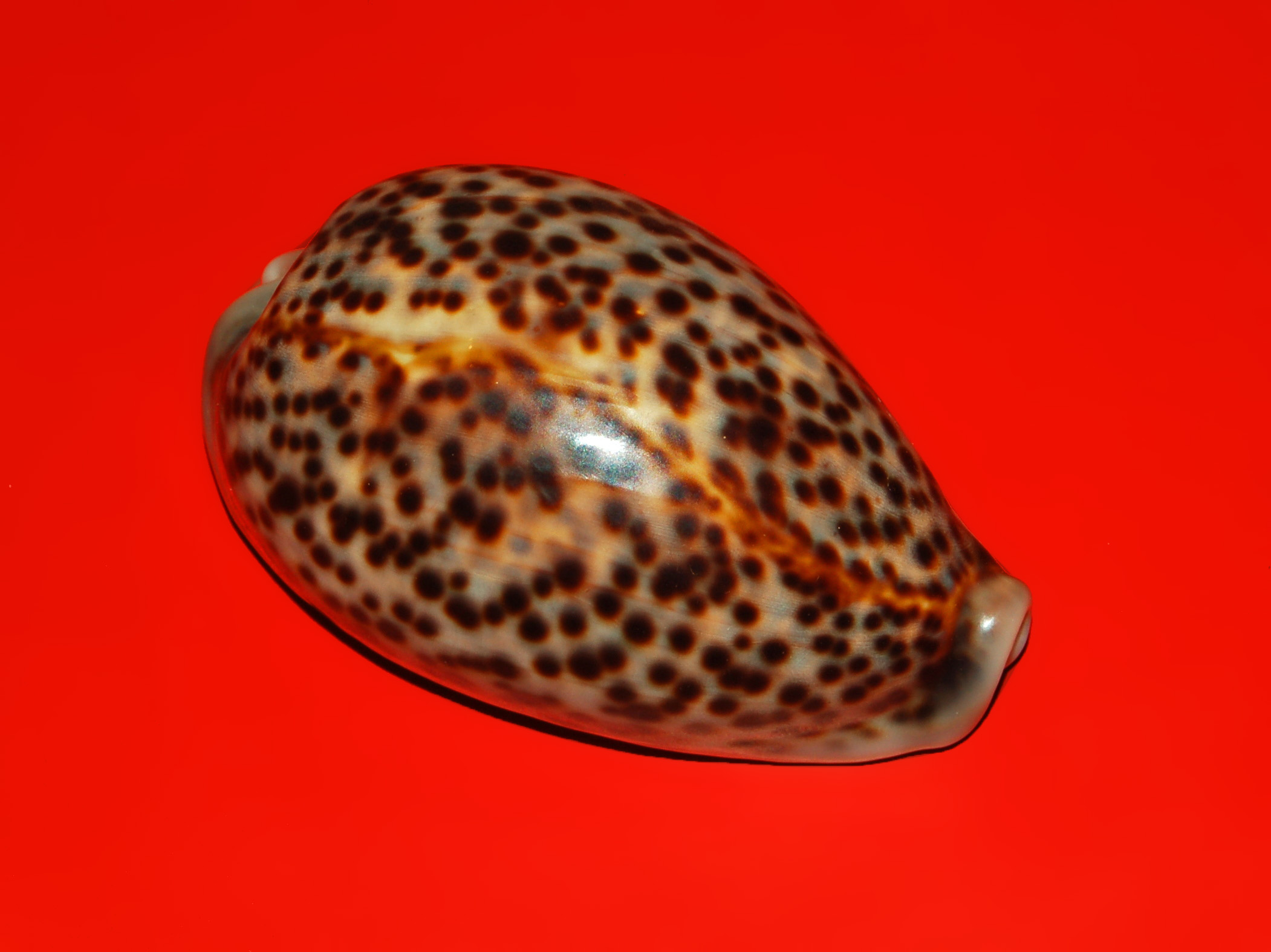
Cypraea pantherina shell

Lambis truncata sebae has a much larger shell than the Nerita species. In this assemblage, these shells were cut to form bangles. 28 bangles made of the species were found throughout the original cemeteries (23 complete, five incomplete).

Cypraea pantherina has the common name "panther cowry". Two individuals of Cypraea pantherina were found throughout the original cemeteries, one in E-01-2 and one in E-03-2, both in association with specific burials. Both specimens were modified such that the lips were widened and inner columellas removed. Kurzawska hypothesizes that this was perhaps done to make the shells into containers, but its true purpose in this context is unknown. At cemetery site E-09-4, three Cypraea pantherina were found on the surface. They showed similar modifications to those at E-01-2 and E-03-2. One of these specimens does show direct evidence of having been used as a container for malachite colorant, with visible green malachite traces remaining.

=== Bivalves ===
The only bivalve species identified in the original cemeteries is Chambardia rubens arcuata, which originates in the Nile River (freshwater). Like the Red Sea mollusks, the presence of this Nile species also indicates trade or travel. 16 specimens were present within the first cemeteries, some whole and some fragments. Two valves found in E-03-2 contained the remnants of green pigment. According to Kurzawska, this indicates they were likely used as either containers or pallets for colorants. Since most of the valves showed no signs of modification or use, there is uncertainty surrounding other roles this species may have played in funerary tradition and general culture. It is possible the shells were used as spoons or small dishes. The mollusk itself may have been eaten, as well.

Nile River bivalves have also been cited as present within the cemeteries of site E-09-02.

=== Unidentifiable ===
Some heavily modified shells could not be identified in the original cemetery assemblage. Small disc-shaped beads, carved pendants, and thin nose-plugs all made with shell were unable to be identified in this study. The various artifacts were, however, determined to be made of marine shell. Kurzawska states that they likely all originated from the Red Sea, like the other identified marine shells in the assemblage.

The small disc-shaped beads are all around 0.4 cm in diameter. Most of them were located together, associated with a burial in cemetery E-01-2. They were likely strung together in a necklace or other jewelry piece.

Nine ovular shell pendants were found associated with an adult female buried in cemetery E-01-2. A triangular pendant was found in another burial within the same cemetery.

Two small shell nose-plugs (used for septum piercings) were found, one buried with an adult female in cemetery E-01-2, the other on the surface of E-03-1.

== Archaeobotany ==
An archaeobotanical study was done at Gebel Ramlah cemetery sites E-01-2, E-03-1 and E-03-2 by Maria Lityńska-Zając. Minimal botanical remains were found, and few samples were collected in general: 20 samples from E-01-2, four from E-03-1, and two from E-03-2. These were collected from various different site locations, including under skeletal remains, within pottery vessels and bone containers, within fire pits, and generally within burials/burial areas. Some of these were soil samples, which did not always contain botanical evidence. One of the E-01-2 samples, two of the E-03-1 samples, and both of the E-03-2 samples did not contain any botanical remains. Other samples were taken in places where heavy charcoal was visibly noticeable in the soil.

=== Wood ===
The majority of the remains found were the charcoal remnants of wood from fires. Many of these charcoal fragments were very small, and 60% (over 512 pieces) were unidentifiable. The identified fragments were only identifiable to the genus level, and they all fall within two tree genera still common in the region today. 38% (274 pieces) are Tamarix sp., and 2% (21 pieces) are Acacia sp. Many of the larger, identifiable fragments were collected from fire pit features. According to Lityńska-Zając, these charcoal wood fragments were primarily used, most likely, for fire and fuel. Some acacias can be used to make colorants, so this is also a possibility considering the evidence of colorants as grave goods as well.

=== Seeds and grains ===
Also in the assemblage were two identifiable seeds (of the genus Grevia) and one identifiable grain (sorghum, or Sorgum bicolor). Sorghum is a domesticated grain that is commonly found in nearby sites, such as Nabta Playa. Sorghum's presence at Gebel Ramlah provides further evidence for its role as an early gathered domesticate in the region. Grevia sp. are trees and shrubs, with edible fruits. Lityńska-Zając hypothesizes that these fruits may have been imported from elsewhere.

== Physical anthropology ==
Joel D. Irish has done extensive physical anthropological analysis on the human remains of Gebel Ramlah. His research conducted at Gebel Ramlah includes both analysis of craniometry and dental morphology. Poor preservation can sometimes limit skeletal analyses, but the quantity of burials still allows extensive physical research. The inhabitants of Gebel Ramlah, located in between upper Egypt to their north and Nubia to their south, naturally show physical traits characteristic of both of these populations. In general, morphological study indicates that Gebel Ramlah populations were the product of sub-Saharan and North African admixture. Moreover, despite cultural variations, particularly variations in burial practices between cemeteries, physical assessments indicate that differing populations within Gebel Ramlah likely had the same origins and genetic basis.

Dental and cranial morphological studies consistently cluster Gebel Ramlah individuals as being most similar to Lower Nubians, however Upper Egyptian comparisons fall closely behind and there are similarities and differences with both of these populations. Furthermore, Gebel Ramlah individuals were also considerably taller than Egyptian populations, suggesting a primary genetic input from Nubian populations.

However, these trends and averages do not fully reflect the physical anthropology of Gebel Ramlah inhabitants. Individuals were not homogeneous, with some displaying more sub-Saharan physical traits, others more northern African traits, and with many even showing a different combinations of these features. This is potentially rooted in the trans-humanist pastoralist lifestyle used by many inhabitants of Gebel Ramlah, meaning groups were not isolated from distant populations. Additionally, located near the Nile, Gebel Ramlah was essentially a cultural crossroads for groups both north and south of the Sahara. This likely allowed for a regular gene flow of northern and southern genetic groups.

The overall craniometric and other morphological indicators at the Gebel-Ramlah site, show these inhabitants were intermediate between Europeans and sub-Saharan Africans.

Irish also found that Gebel Ramlah inhabitants seemed to have exceptionally good health, superior to Egyptians who came after. Other than their superior height, there was also a lack of detectable skeletal disease (as well as trauma). In his studies of cemeteries E-01-2, E-03-1 and E-03-2, he found that all 17 subadults showed no sign of disease, and only four of 50 adults had detectable diseases or disorders.

=== Dentition ===
Dental studies are indicative of dietary trends within Gebel Ramlah populations. Angled wear on teeth is potentially associated with intensification of food preparation. Habitation sites nearby confirm that technologies such as grinding stones and pottery were in use, allowing food to be cooked and made less tough. Teeth were more likely to grind against one another when food was made softer. The use of grinding stones likely added sand to food (such as grains) that also worked to grind down teeth. However, the angle of tooth wear was greater than that seen in agricultural populations. According to Irish, this could indicate the primary extensive gathering of wild plants, perhaps alongside the use of a few semi-domesticated foods.

The continued use of primarily wild plants is also supported by a lack of caries on the teeth of Gebel Ramlah individuals. Caries form as a result of heavily consuming domesticated plant foods that are high in carbohydrates. In fact, no caries were found in any Gebel Ramlah remains. Typically a small percentage of caries form even within fully hunter-gatherer societies. Archaeologists are not sure how these lesions were entirely prevented, but Irish suggests that other factors may have been at play as well, such as oral cleansing. He also hypothesizes that the grinding of teeth crowns reduced the surface area where caries could form.
