= Aterian =

Archaeological culture

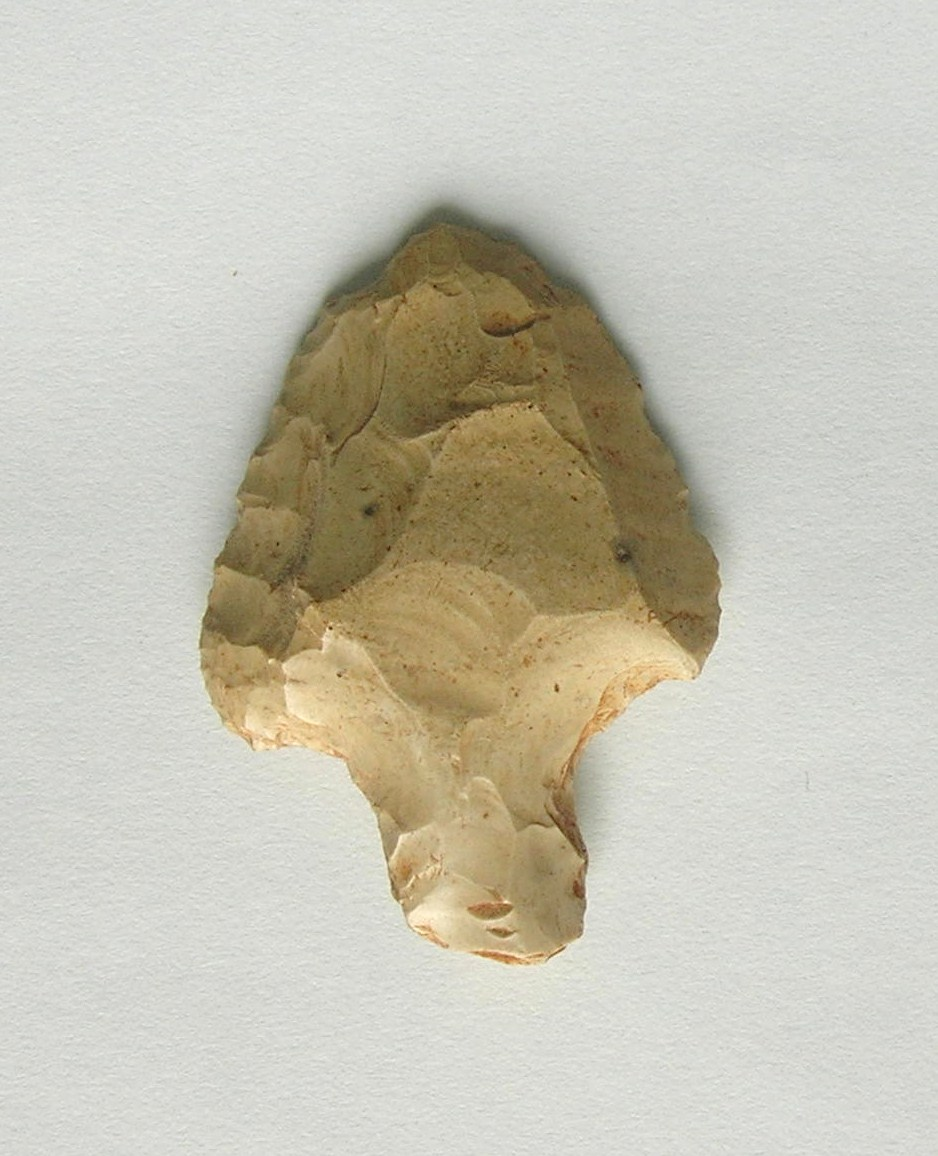
- Aterian point from Zaccar, Djelfa region, Algeria
- Geographical range: North Africa, Sahara, Northeast Africa, Arabia?, Oman?, Thar Desert?
- Period: Middle Palaeolithic – Upper Palaeolithic
- Dates: c. 150,000 – c. 20,000 BP
- Type site: Bir el Ater
- Major sites: Taforalt, Ifri n'Ammar, Kharga Oasis, Dar es Soltan I & II, Grotte des Contrebandiers, Mugharet el Aliya, Uan Tabu, Adrar Bous, Bir Tarfawi
- Preceded by: Mousterian
- Followed by: Emiran, Ahmarian, Khormusan, Iberomaurusian

Selected Aterian sites from the ROAD database (CC BY-SA 4.0 ROCEEH)

The Aterian is a Middle Stone Age (or Middle Palaeolithic) stone tool industry centered in North Africa, from Mauritania to Egypt, but also possibly found in Oman and the Thar Desert. The earliest Aterian dates to c. 150,000 years ago, at the site of Ifri n'Ammar in Morocco. However, most of the early dates cluster around the beginning of the Last Interglacial, around 150,000 to 130,000 years ago, when the environment of North Africa began to ameliorate. The Aterian disappeared around 20,000 years ago.

The Aterian is primarily distinguished through the presence of tanged or pedunculated tools, and is named after the type site of Bir el Ater, south of Tébessa. Bifacially-worked, leaf-shaped tools are also a common artefact type in Aterian assemblages, and so are racloirs and Levallois flakes and cores. Items of personal adornment (pierced and ochred Nassarius shell beads) are known from at least one Aterian site, with an age of 82,000 years. The Aterian is one of the oldest examples of regional technological diversification, evidencing significant differentiation to older stone tool industries in the area, frequently described as Mousterian. The appropriateness of the term Mousterian is contested in a North African context, however.

== Origin ==
Fleming et al. (2013) stated:

But Scerri (2012) also reckoned that the (Aterian) peoples were ultimately of sub-Saharan origin, or as we have proposed, they dispersed from Ethiopia by way of the Sahel and Lake Chad and the (interglacial) Saharan wet spots.

== Description ==
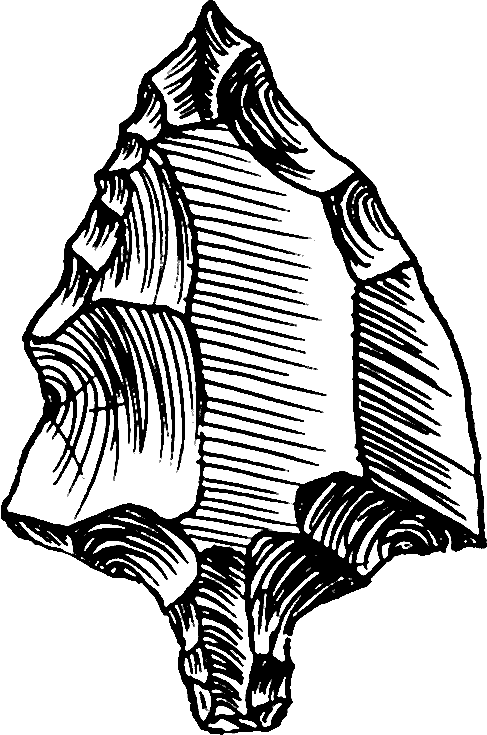
Aterian nosed point

The technological character of the Aterian has been debated for almost a century, but has until recently eluded definition. The problems defining the industry have related to its research history and the fact that a number of similarities have been observed between the Aterian and other North African stone tool industries of the same date. Levallois reduction is widespread across the whole of North Africa throughout the Middle Stone Age, and scrapers and denticulates are ubiquitous. Bifacial foliates moreover represent a huge taxonomic category and the form and dimension of such foliates associated with tanged tools is extremely varied. There is also a significant variation of tanged tools themselves, with various forms representing both different tool types (e.g., knives, scrapers, points) and the degree tool resharpening.

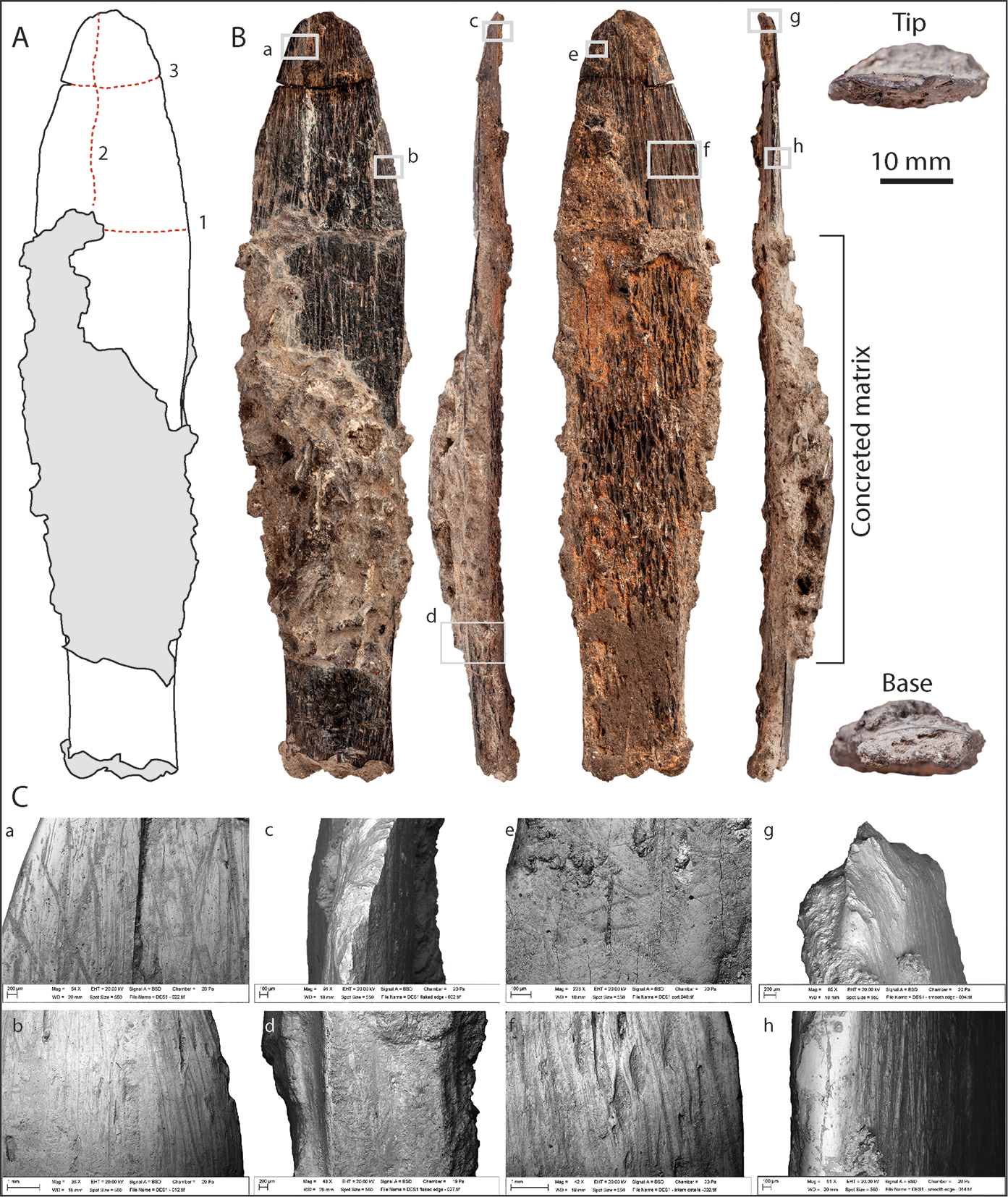
Specialised bone tool in the Aterian Middle Stone Age of North Africa 90,000 year-old Dar es-Soltan

More recently, a large-scale study of North African stone tool assemblages, including Aterian assemblages, indicated that the traditional concept of stone tool industries is problematic in the North African Middle Stone Age. Although the term Aterian defines Middle Stone Age assemblages from North Africa with tanged tools, the concept of an Aterian industry obfuscates other similarities between tanged tool assemblages and other non-Aterian North African assemblages of the same date. For example, bifacial leaf points are found widely across North Africa in assemblages that lack tanged tools and Levallois flakes and cores are near ubiquitous. Instead of elaborating discrete industries, the findings of the comparative study suggest that North Africa during the Last Interglacial comprised a network of related technologies whose similarities and differences correlated with geographical distance and the palaeohydrology of a Green Sahara. Assemblages with tanged tools may therefore reflect particular activities involving the use of such tool types, and may not necessarily reflect a substantively different archaeological culture to others from the same period in North Africa. The findings are significant because they suggest that current archaeological nomenclatures do not reflect the true variability of the archaeological record of North Africa during the Middle Stone Age from the Last Interglacial, and hints at how early modern humans dispersed into previously uninhabitable environments. This notwithstanding, the term still usefully denotes the presence of tanged tools in North African Middle Stone Age assemblages.

Tanged tools persisted in North Africa until around 20,000 years ago, with the youngest sites located in Northwest Africa. By this time, the Aterian lithic industry had long ceased to exist in the rest of North Africa due to the onset of the Ice Age, which in North Africa resulted in hyperarid conditions. Assemblages with tanged tools, 'the Aterian', therefore have a significant temporal and spatial range. However, the exact geographical distribution of this lithic industry is uncertain. The Aterian's spatial range is thought to have existed in North Africa up to the Nile Valley. Possible Aterian lithic tools have also been discovered in Middle Paleolithic deposits in Oman and the Thar Desert.

Most engraved Bubaline rock art appear in the northern region of Tassili, at Wadi Djerat. Levallois instruments in the area may indicate that Bubaline rock art was developed by Aterians.

In the Sahara, Aterians camped near lakes, rivers, and springs, and engaged in the activity of hunting (e.g., antelope, buffalo, elephant, rhinoceros) and some gathering. As a result of a hyper-aridification event of Saharan Africa, which occurred around the time of Europe's Würm glaciation event, Aterian hunter-gatherers may have migrated into areas of tropical Africa and coastal Africa. More specifically, amid aridification in MIS 5 and regional change of climate in MIS 4, in the Sahara and the Sahel, Aterians may have migrated southward into West Africa (e.g., Baie du Levrier, Mauritania; Tiemassas, Senegal; Lower Senegal River Valley).

== Associated behaviour ==
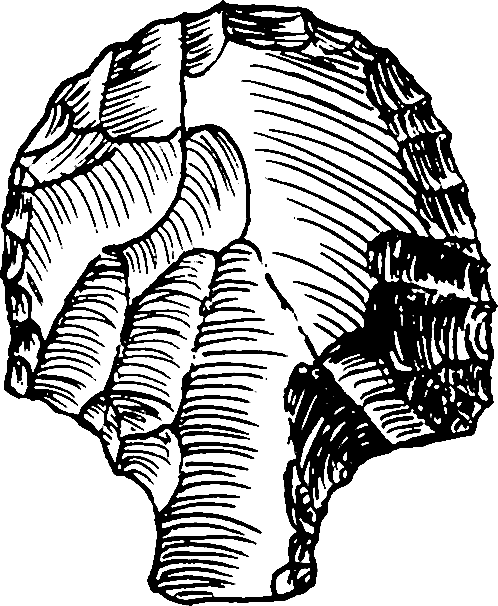
Aterian nosed end-scraper

The Aterian is associated with early Homo sapiens at a number of sites in Morocco. While the Jebel Irhoud specimens were originally noted to have been similar to later Aterian and some Iberomaurusian specimens, further examinations revealed that the Jebel Irhoud specimens are similar to them in some respects but differ in that the Jebel Irhoud specimens have a continuous supraorbital torus while the Aterian and Iberomaurasian specimens have a discontinuous supraorbital torus or in some cases, none at all, and from this, it was concluded that the Jebel Irhoud specimens represent archaic Homo sapiens while the Aterian and Iberomaurusian specimens represent anatomically modern Homo sapiens. The 'Aterian' fossils also display morphological similarities with the early out of Africa modern humans found at Skhul and Qafzeh in the Levant, and they are broadly contemporary to them. Apart from producing a highly distinctive and sophisticated stone tool technology, these early North African populations also seem to have engaged with symbolically constituted material culture, creating what are amongst the earliest African examples of personal ornamentation. Such examples of shell 'beads' have been found far inland, suggesting the presence of long distance social networks.

Studies of the variation and distribution of the Aterian have also now suggested that associated populations lived in subdivided populations, perhaps living most of their lives in relative isolation and aggregating at particular times to reinforce social ties. Such a subdivided population structure has also been inferred from the pattern of variation observed in early African fossils of Homo sapiens.

Associated faunal studies suggest that the people making the Aterian exploited coastal resources as well as engaging in hunting. As the points are small and lightweight, it is likely that they were not hand-delivered but instead thrown. There is no evidence that a spear thrower was used, but the points have characteristics similar to atlatl dart points. It has so far been difficult to estimate whether Aterian populations further inland were exploiting freshwater resources as well. Studies have suggested that hafting was widespread, perhaps to maintain flexibility in the face of strongly seasonal environment with a pronounced dry season. Scrapers, knives and points all seem to have been hafted, suggesting a wide range of activities were facilitated by technological advances. It is probable that plant resources were also exploited. Although there is no direct evidence from the Aterian yet, plant processing is evidenced in North Africa from as much as 182,000 years ago. In 2012, a 90,000-year-old bone knife was discovered in the Dar es-Soltan I cave, which is basically made of a cattle-sized animal's rib.

== Associated language ==
Due to the archaeological spread of the Aterian culture and unique linguistic spread of the Niger-Congo languages (e.g., languages of the Atlantic coast in Senegal, Kordofan in Sudan), Fleming et al. (2013) indicates that possibly the "Nilo-Saharan linguistic phylum is derived from the Aterian culture area."

== Locations ==
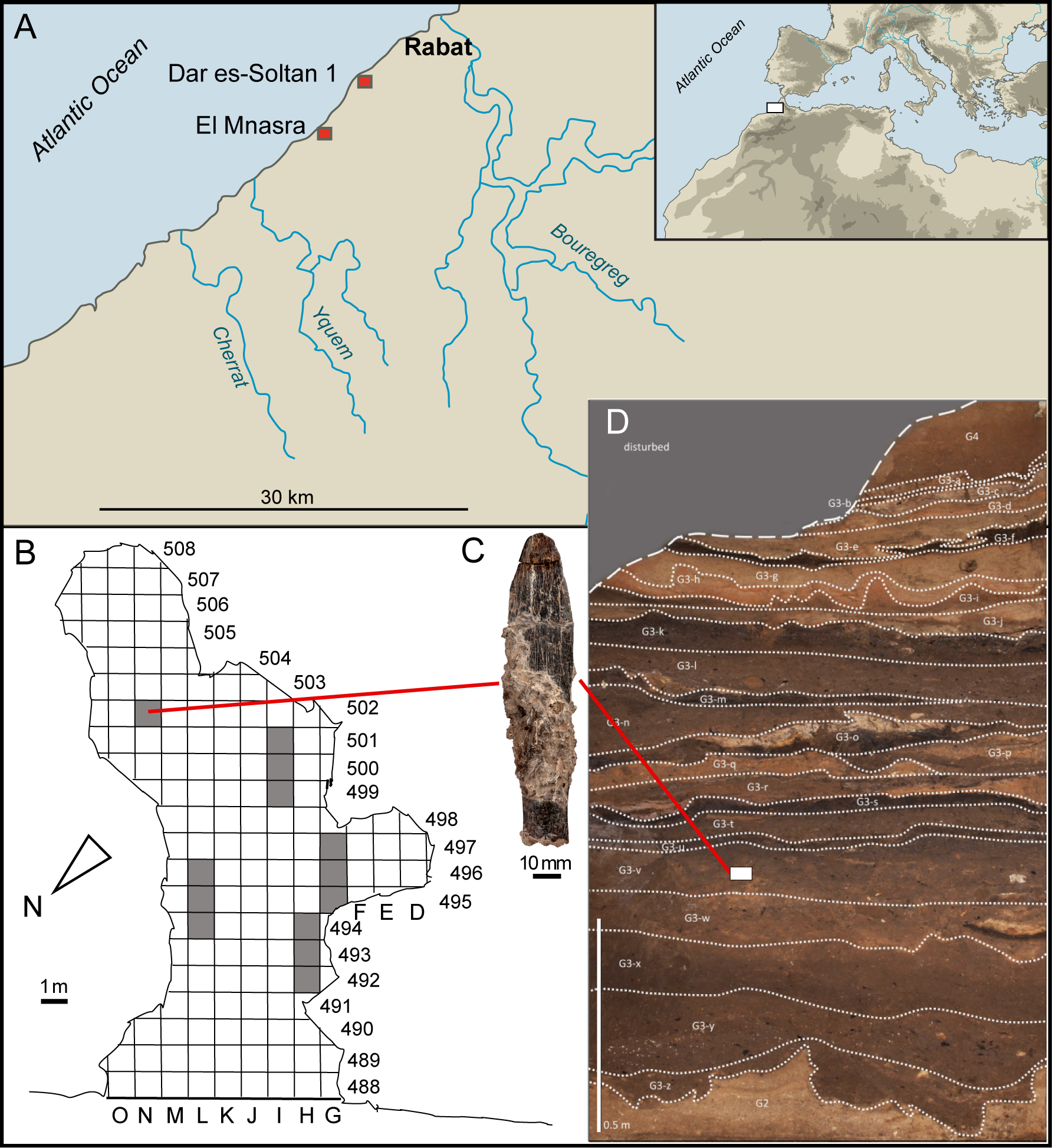
Archaeological and stratigraphical context of the bone implement from Dar es-Soltan 1, dated, 90,000 years BP

=== North Africa ===
- Ifri n'Ammar (Morocco)
- Contrebandiers (Morocco)
- Taforalt (Morocco)
- Rhafas (Morocco)
- Dar es Soltan I (Morocco)
- El Mnasra (Morocco)
- Kharga Oasis (Egypt)
- Uan Tabu (Libya)
- Oued el Akarit(Tunisia)
- Adrar Bous (Niger)
