= Rock engravings of Oued Djerat =

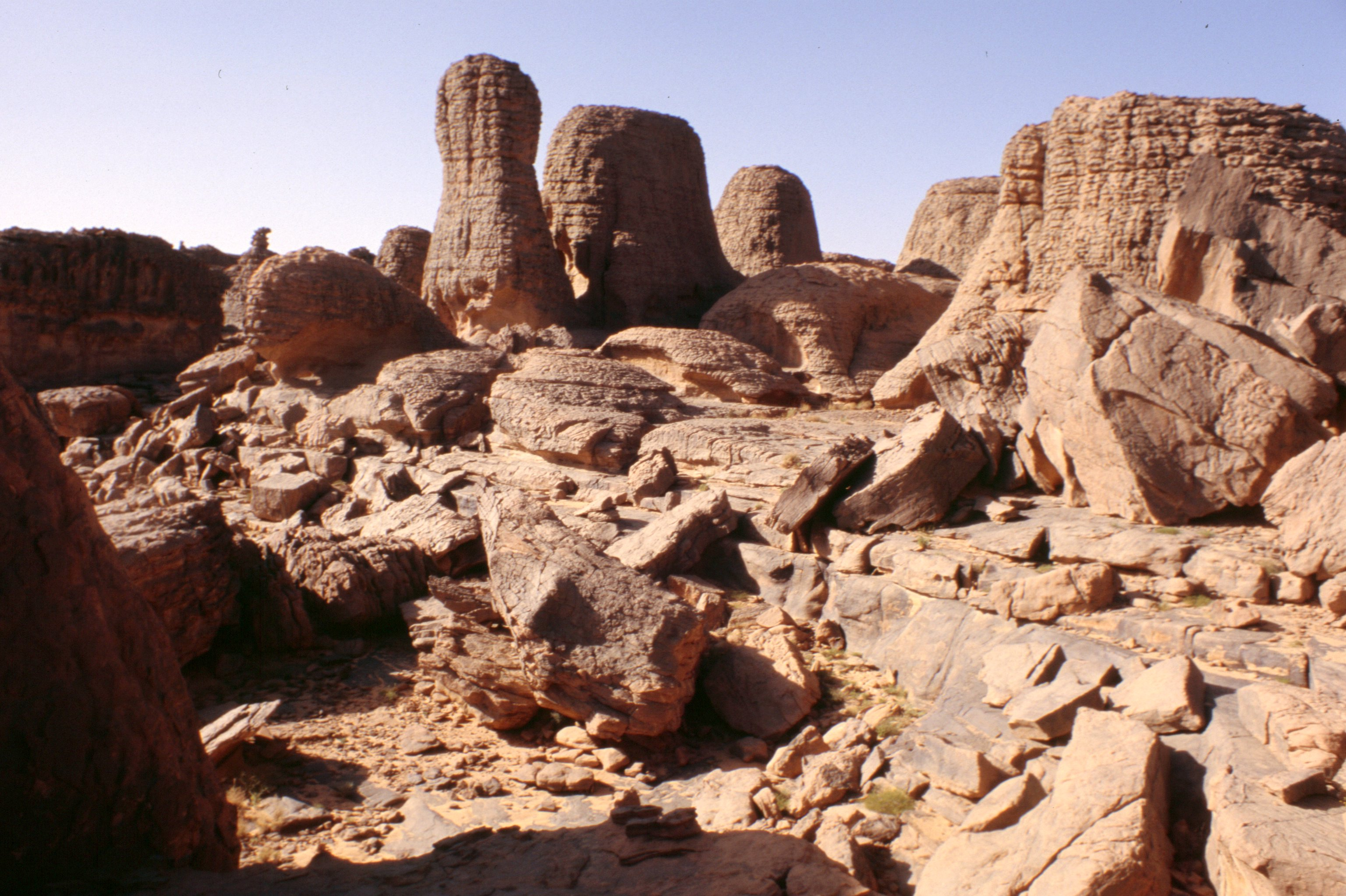
Landscape of Tassili n'Ajjer (Algeria)

The rock engravings of Oued Djerat, located in the Tassili n'Ajjer, Algeria, and dated to the Neolithic period, have many affinities with those of the South Oranese (Algeria) and the Fezzan (Libya). According to Henri Lhote, they date back more than 7000 years. He estimated that they comprise more than 4,000 drawings.

In terms of subject matter, many depictions feature large game animals found today in East Africa. Domestic animals include sheep, goats, and oxen. Depictions of humans reveal information about their clothing and hairstyles. In the Bubaline period, war scenes are absent and hunting scenes are rare. In contrast, sexual scenes are numerous in several periods.

== History ==
It seems, writes Henri Lhote, that the engravings of Oued Djerat "have been known for a long time and have been reported to the explorer F. Foureau, during his expedition of 1892–1893 ". In 1932, Lieutenant Brenans made a survey of a certain number of them that he sent to Maurice Reygasse, then curator of the Bardo Museum in Algiers. During the winter of 1934 the professors Émile Félix Gautier and M. Reygasse studied them and published several notes shortly afterwards. Amazed by his great naturalist engravings, he nicknamed the Oued Djerat "the Vézère of the Sahara". The same year, in November, Henri Lhote accompanied the geographer R. Perret. During the winter 1935 M. Reygasse returned to Oued Djerat, accompanied by the painter Rigal who executed some engravings and paintings.

After having raised the paintings of Tassili in 1956–1957, Henri Lhote, encouraged by the General de Gaulle and several ministers, undertakes in 1959, at the head of a team of five people to which several Tuareg collaborators are added, to make an inventory of the engravings of Oued Djerat (which he will see again in 1969 and 1970). Not only did he make surveys and photographs of them, but he also made about sixty casts (liquid latex and siccative). The repertory that he published in 1976 describes 73 stations (numbered by going down the wadi) and includes 2605 figures from different periods. The author, specifying that there are several missing panels that were not numbered, estimates that in total the number of engravings "certainly exceeds 4000". "This figure, exceptional for a single valley and over such a short distance, shows the remarkable character of the wadi Djerat," he concludes.

The Lhote expedition was exceptional by the information it was able to provide, by the endurance of its members in the face of difficult living conditions in the Tassili. However, the brutal methods used at the time by the Lhote team (wetting with a wet sponge, scribbling with charcoal) have destroyed in some places the biological information that would have allowed them to be dated. Today, some paintings are falling apart because of the frequent wetting of the visitors.

== Localization ==
Map of rock art in the Sahara

The Djerat wadi is a cañon dug in the Tassili siluro-devonian sandstones which runs between very steep cliffs. It flows into the valley of Illizi, about a hundred kilometers from the Libyan border. The wadi is on average 200 meters wide, its cliffs varying from 25 to 30 meters high at the outlet, reaching 150 meters towards the palm grove of Nafeg and reducing towards its sources. It receives many tributaries, including the wadis Afar and Assahor, which provide a large volume of water at the time of rains. The two banks of the wadi are covered with engravings over a distance, according to the maps published by Lhote in his work, of nearly twenty kilometers.

They are located on the upper terraces of the wadi, on the vertical walls of fallen blocks, most often on the horizontal surface of rocks in place. Being placed at a height of 8 to 12 meters above the lower terrace, the flood level does not reach them.

The research carried out at the foot of the engravings gave no clues as to the polishing process and the tools used, which, given the diversity of the widths and depths of the gutters, must not have been of a single type.

== Classification ==
These engravings belong to several periods. Lhote, relying on the differences in the patinas and the techniques of the line, resumes his classification in four periods elaborated from the documents studied in the central Sahara, applied to the rock engravings of the South-Oranese by introducing complementary sub-stages, then extended to those of the Moroccan South and of the Rio de Oro, to the engravings of the South-Algerian and the South-Constantinois, as to those of Fezzan.

Lhote thus distinguishes four periods for the engravings of the oued Djerat.

=== The Bubalus or Bubaline period ===
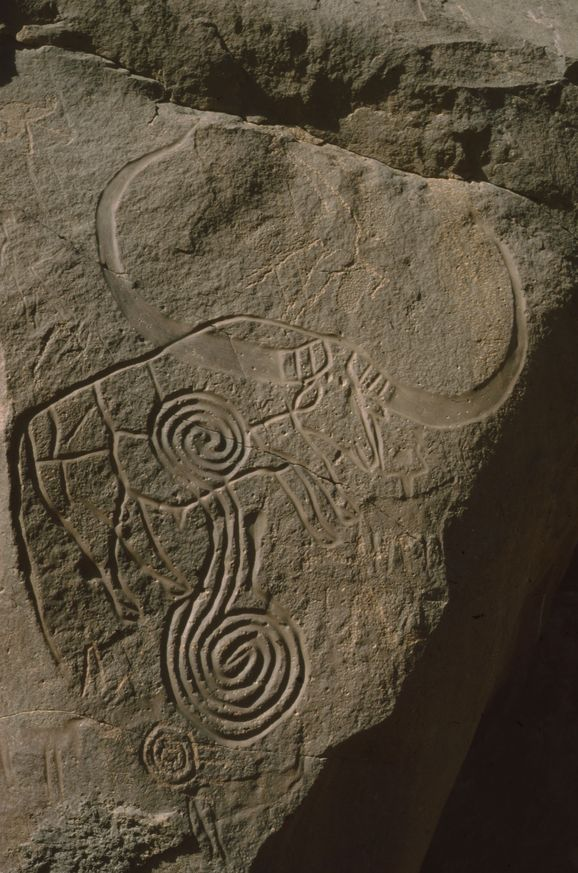
Figure of Bubalus antiquus and spirals.

According to Lhote, 1060 engravings can be related to the period of Bubalus antiquus, most often of large size. Their outline is generally polished (in a lowered U-shape), but sometimes in a V-shape or simply staked, and their patina is very dark. If some subjects are depicted below their natural size, others are life-size, if not above, and it is rare that the representations measure less than one meter. Lhote cites a dozen cases in which the image was supplemented by a mediocre copy that seems to be contemporary with it. The style is on the whole naturalistic but some animals (giraffes) may be schematized. In sixteen cases the diocular formula (eyes placed one above the other) is used, as in certain engravings of the South Oranese: one can suppose according to the author that they reflect "what there is of more ancient in Djerat".

The varieties of styles that remain difficult to place in chronological order "seem to correspond to a very long duration of the bubaline period during which changes in lifestyle must have occurred," writes Lhote. For him, the Oxen only appeared in a second period and the "women with spread legs" in a terminal period. Since the work of Lhote, it appeared that the notion of a so-called "period" of the Bubalus, also called "Bubalin" and which would be prior to the Bovidian, does not correspond to reality, because the Bubalus is one of the styles of engravings of the Bovidian, as demonstrated by Alfred Muzzolini in the early 1980s, in work that has been amply confirmed since.

=== The period of the Bovidian Pastoralists or Bovidian period ===
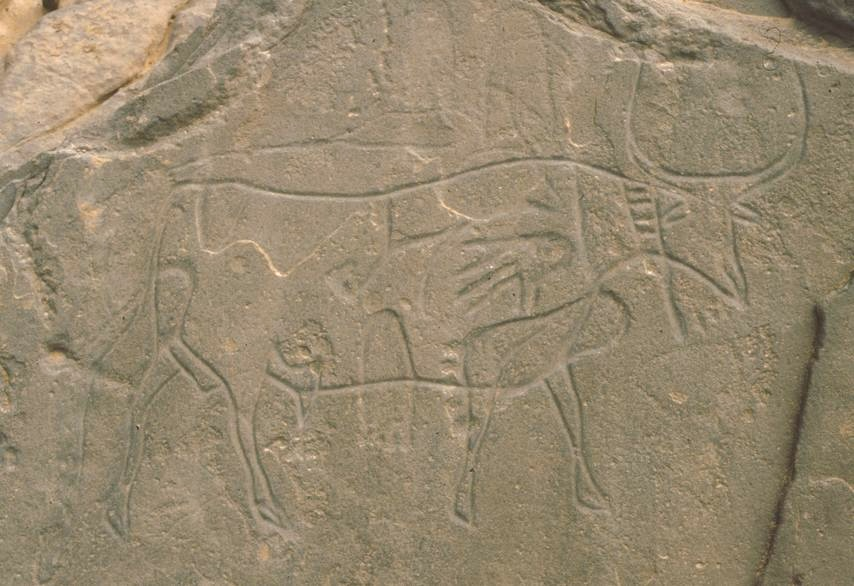
Bovine figurines, footprints, and handprints.

The 300 engravings, generally of more modest dimensions and of a more careless style, that Lhote attributes to him have, on the whole, more figurations with pitted than polished outlines. Their dark patina, most often grayish, no longer reaches the intensity of brilliant black. Most of them feature bovids with stenciled outlines, of a lower quality than the previous works, but also some giraffes, elephants, ostriches, and rare rhinoceroses. "The bovid engravers seem to have made only brief intrusions into Wadi Djerat, whose torrential nature was not conducive to the stay of cattle," concludes the author.

=== The Horse or Caballine period ===
The Caballine populations, who frequented the region much more than the cattle herders, left more traces of their passage, at least 420 engravings (as well as paintings) of small dimensions. Their staking is fine and regular, their patina buff. The populations of this time, arrived in the Sahara with the tank, used bronze and it is not necessary for their realization to eliminate, according to Lhote, the use of points of this metal.

This period is divided into two sub-periods, one analphabetic, characterized by the chariots, the second alphabetic, with the appearance of Libyan-Berber characters.

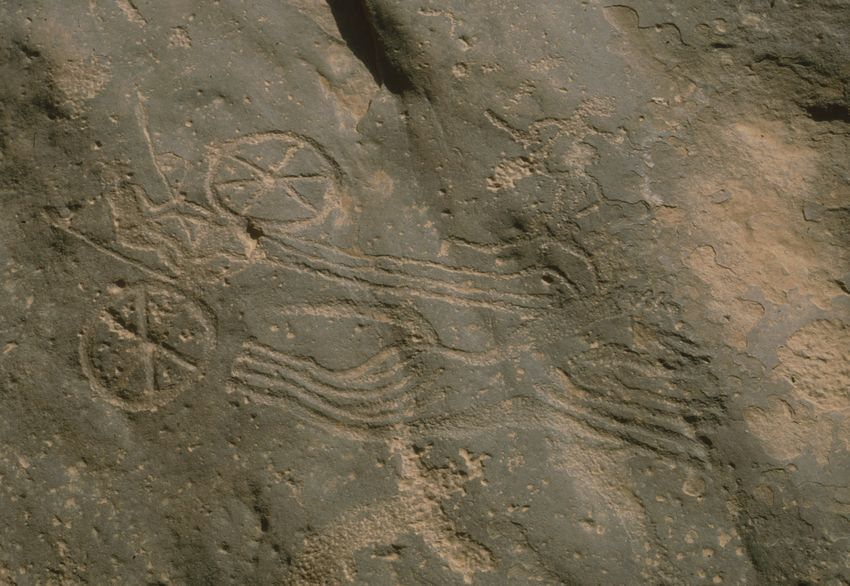
Chariot with horses in a “flying gallop”

Henri Lhote distinguishes four groups from the point of view of style. The first is that of the "chariots with flying gallop" and of the "warriors carrying the Libyan feather", armed with javelins. The zoomorphic headdress of one of them recalls that of the Shardanes of the Sea Peoples.

The second, particular to the Djerat wadi, would be composed of slender human figurations, mainly masculine ithyphallic, wearing feathers and a pointed beard. "Several of them are busy practicing the sexual act," notes Lhote. Several archers "shoot each other" or chase the mouflon.

A third group presents (station I) small figures, several of which carry a javelin, a round shield and a dagger hanging from the arm. The fauna is composed of felines and perhaps a rhinoceros.

A fourth, later group appears to be alphabetical. It is represented by "large figures with rectangular tunics". The fauna is composed of giraffes, lions, cattle, mouflons, ostriches and dogs.

=== The Camel period ===
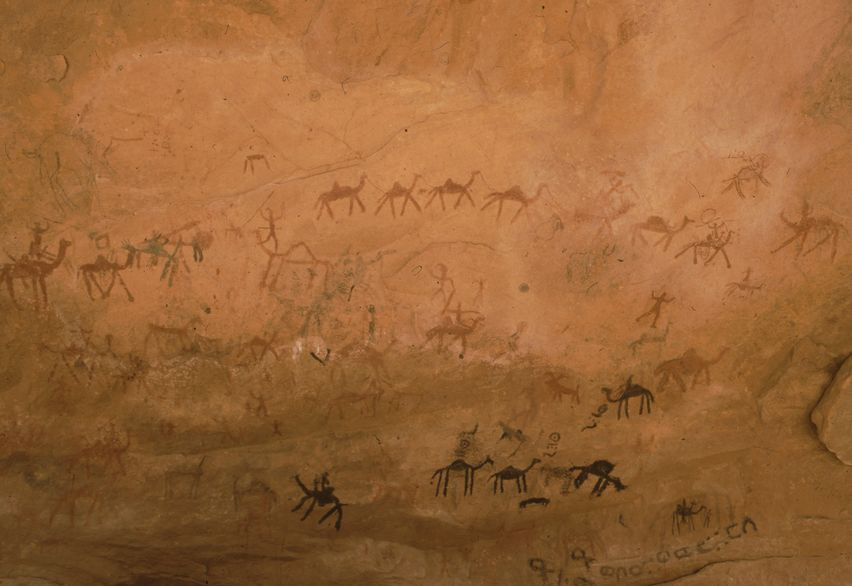
Camel period: Drawings of animals and people

These later engravings, with a light, almost white patina, are clearly less numerous than in the previous period. Made by direct percussion, without the use of an intermediate tool, their contours are very irregular and the subjects (characters, camels, ostriches, horses, oxen) are small. Alphabetical inscriptions appear on them.

The first two periods are prehistoric, the next two historical.

According to Lhote "the interest of the rock paintings of Wadi Djerat lies especially in the engravings of the period of the Bubal (...) both by their quantity and their quality and the problems they raise".

== Animal and human representations ==
=== Wildlife ===
It has about thirty species that show the presence of very abundant vegetation and water bodies of some permanence. The species identified on the engravings are :

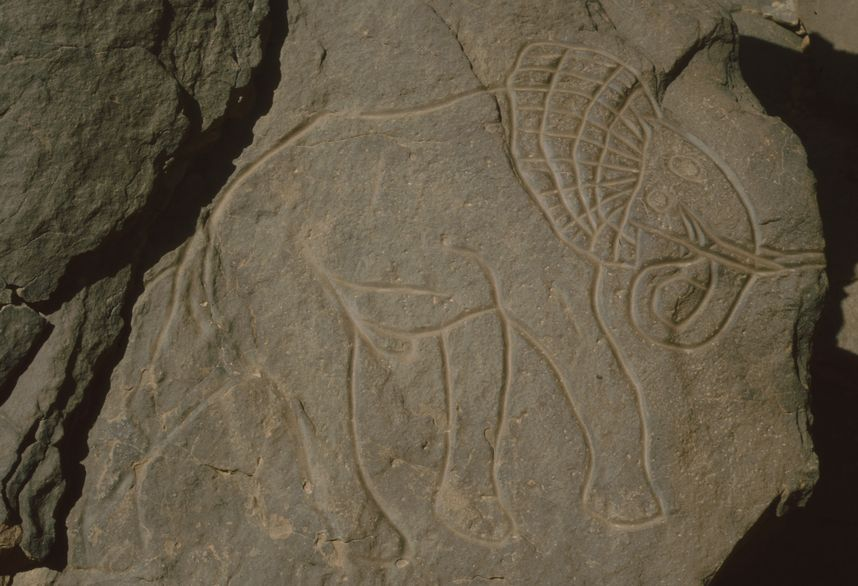
Figure of elephant with "butterfly ears"

- the Ancient Buffalo (12 specimens),
- the Elephant (96 specimens, including one of 470 cm at station XXV, for the bubaline and bovidian periods, represented according to six different formulas),
- the Hippopotamus (22 specimens),
- the Rhinoceros (119 specimens at Oued Djerat, which confirm the humidity of the Tassili in the Bubaline period),
- the Giraffe (54 specimens of which a certain number later than the time of the hartebeest (Note: Lhote reports, not in Wadi Djerat per se but at the chaaba Ti-n-Tehed, a tributary of the left bank of the wadi, a few dozen meters from the confluence (station LXXXIII), a group of twelve giraffes, engraved on a slab barely inclined, the largest of which measures nearly 850 cm, "the whole covering an area of 120 m2 (1,300 sq ft), which makes it the most monumental parietal work of all prehistoric art. Lhote reports that it did not seem conceivable to André Malraux, interested in the paintings of Tassili and the engravings of the oued Djerat, that the possession of such an aptitude to the drawing "would not have been due to a teaching given by experienced masters, otherwise how to believe that it was possible to a prehistoric man to succeed at once a giraffe of 8,50 m on a horizontal slab? (cf Lhote 1976, pp. 758, 779))),
- the wild donkey,
- the Horse Antelope (11 specimens, generally from the bubaline period),
- the Oryx antelope (2 specimens from the bubaline period),
- the Addax antelope (5 specimens), the Gazelle (little represented but common at the time),
- the Mouflon,
- the Warthog (one specimen, the only one in the Sahara, although it must have been very widespread there),
- the Orycterope (an uncertain specimen),
- the Cercopithecus (one specimen),
- the Cynocephalus (4 specimens),
- the Lion (about ten specimens for the bubaline period, some specimens for the following periods),
- the Cheetah (3 specimens),
- the Hyena (3 specimens),
- the Cynhyene (several uncertain specimens),
- the Jackal (one specimen),
- the Hare (one copy but several zoomorphic engravings represent characters with long ears resembling those of the hare),
- the Ostrich (represented at all times according to various styles),
- the Pink Flamingo (3 specimens), the Pelican (a group, more likely representing shoebill storks),
- the Owl (2 specimens probably belonging to a rather late stage of the bubaline period),
- the Crocodile (4 incomplete specimens),
- the Python (one specimen),
- the Viper (3 specimens attributable to the Caballine period),
- the Snakes (2 specimens of the Caballine period),
- the manatee (uncertain specimen)
- the Fish (3 specimens at the station XVII reminding the Mormyre of Niger and Chad).

=== Domestic animals ===
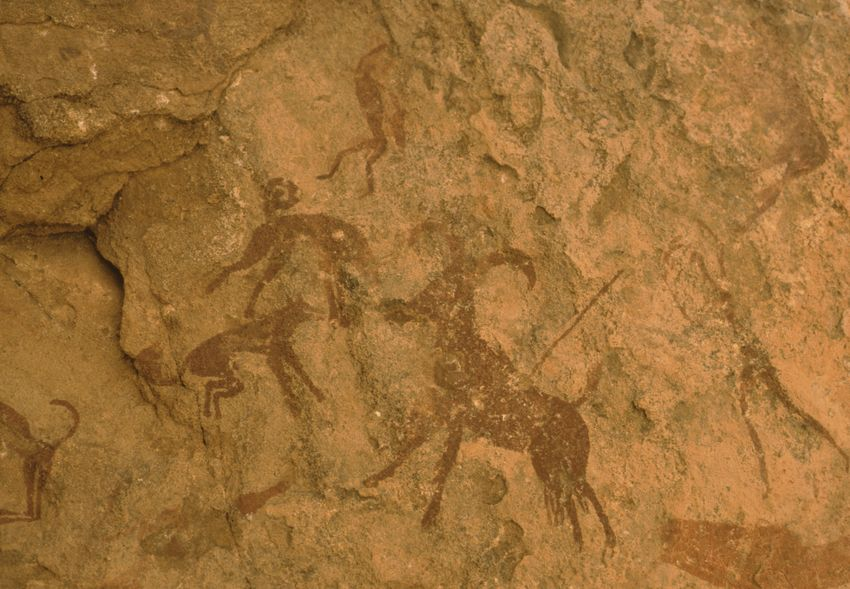
Hunting scene with dogs and mouflon

Several species are represented:

- the goat (5 specimens in the bubaline period, some others in the caballine period),
- the sheep (on 9 specimens, some doubtful, none carries the solar disc characteristic of the engravings of the south-oranais), (Note: Henri Lhote estimates that one must consider that goats and sheep "were already held in captivity" and perhaps "completely domesticated". (Ibid, p. 787))
- the dog (7 uncertain specimens, difficult to differentiate from the jackal, and a large number of late period),
- The ox occupies a special position because of the questions that arise concerning its domestication. The style, the technique of realization and the patina of the engravings representing bovids presenting little difference with the engravings of hartebeests, rhinoceroses or elephants, Lhote judged in 1960 that there is reason "to return to the old conception which did not admit the domesticated Ox in the group of engravings of the bubaline period". A certain number of superimpositions (notably by rhinoceroses) constitute proof of this. One example is also represented according to the diocular formula, "unmistakable character of archaism". Several categories of evidence, including neck attributes (simple and dangling collars) or, for 15 of the 238 bovids represented, on the head (only two discs but often parallel lines on the ends of the horns or tiaras) and the coexistence of two species (Bos brachyceros and Bos africanus with lyre-shaped horns, sometimes on the same panels), would be, according to the author, "quite convincing evidence of the exploitation of Bovidae by man". Some scenes also associate the man with the ox, whose attitude does not seem to imply aggression but "emotional feelings, even adoration". For Lhote, "we must now admit that the domestication of beef must have been known in the bubaline period, if not on a large scale, at least at its beginning", "probably in a late phase of this period". These problems derived from the a priori construction of a Bubaline period prior to the Bovidian. Gradually, Lhote realized that domestic cattle were found in this alleged period, which contradicted his chronology, but he never modified it, even though the logical conclusion was that the "Bubaline" was really a style, not a period. On the other hand, he saw that the rams of the South-Oranese could not derive, contrary to what Stéphane Gsell and Raymond Vaufrey thought, from the Egyptian cult of Ammon, the Hator Cow, provided with a solar disk, which appears with the first Egyptian dynasties (around 3000 years BC), cannot be according to the author at the origin of the few frontal disks of the oxen of Oued Djerat. "There is reason to reject any Egyptian influence on the ancient engravings of Tassili and, consequently, on those of Fezzan," concludes the author. Subsequently, the detailed study of all the alleged "Egyptian influences" that the ancient authors believed to detect in the central Sahara and in the Atlas showed that these connections were very superficial and were based on a very insufficient knowledge of Egyptian records.

=== Strange animals ===
A certain number of animal representations of Oued Djerat remain unidentifiable. Lhote mentions about fifteen cases. If some of them appear unfinished or in their "failed" malformations, testifying to the existence of poorly skilled engravers, others, true figurations of imaginary beasts with a composite structure, seem to be pure fantasy.

=== Human figures and cultural elements ===
The human figurations of the Bubaline period, numbering 63, can be classified into three groups: natural profiles, complex profiles with hairstyles and zoomorphic heads.

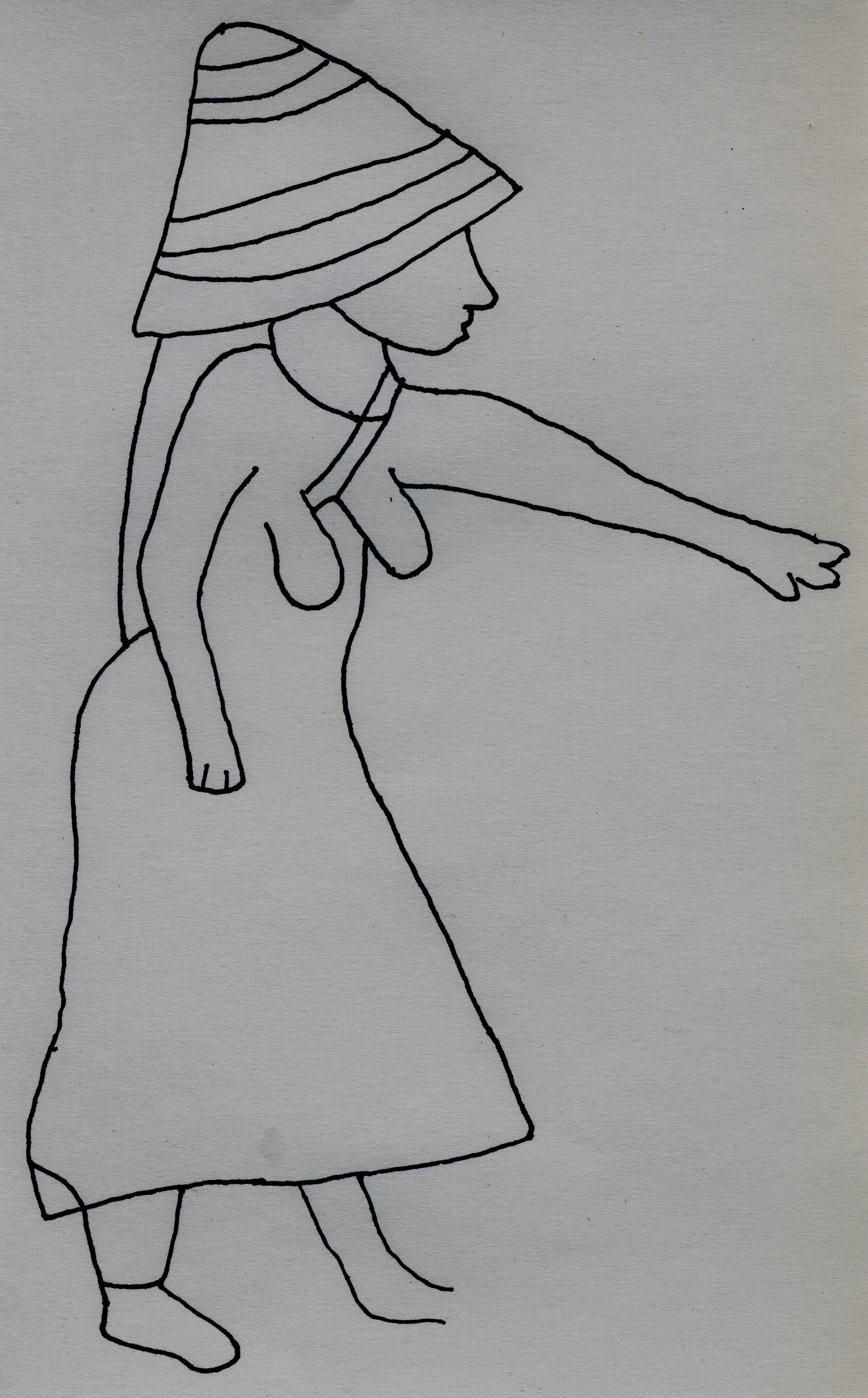
Period of the bubalus: schematic sketch of a female figure, detail of a sexual scene of the station XXXI (H: 225 cm)

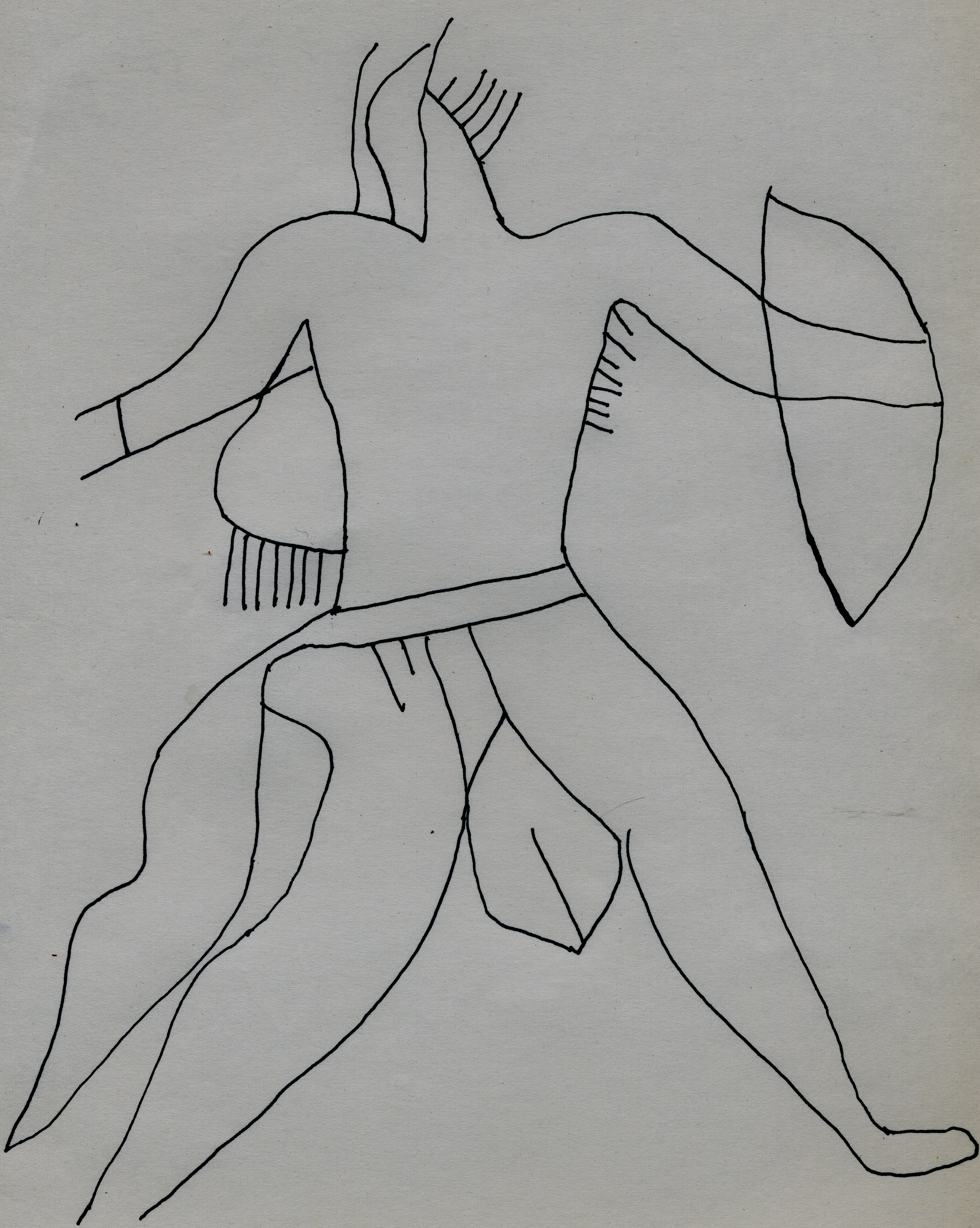
Period of the bubalus: schematic sketch of a male figure (H: around 100 cm), station XXVII

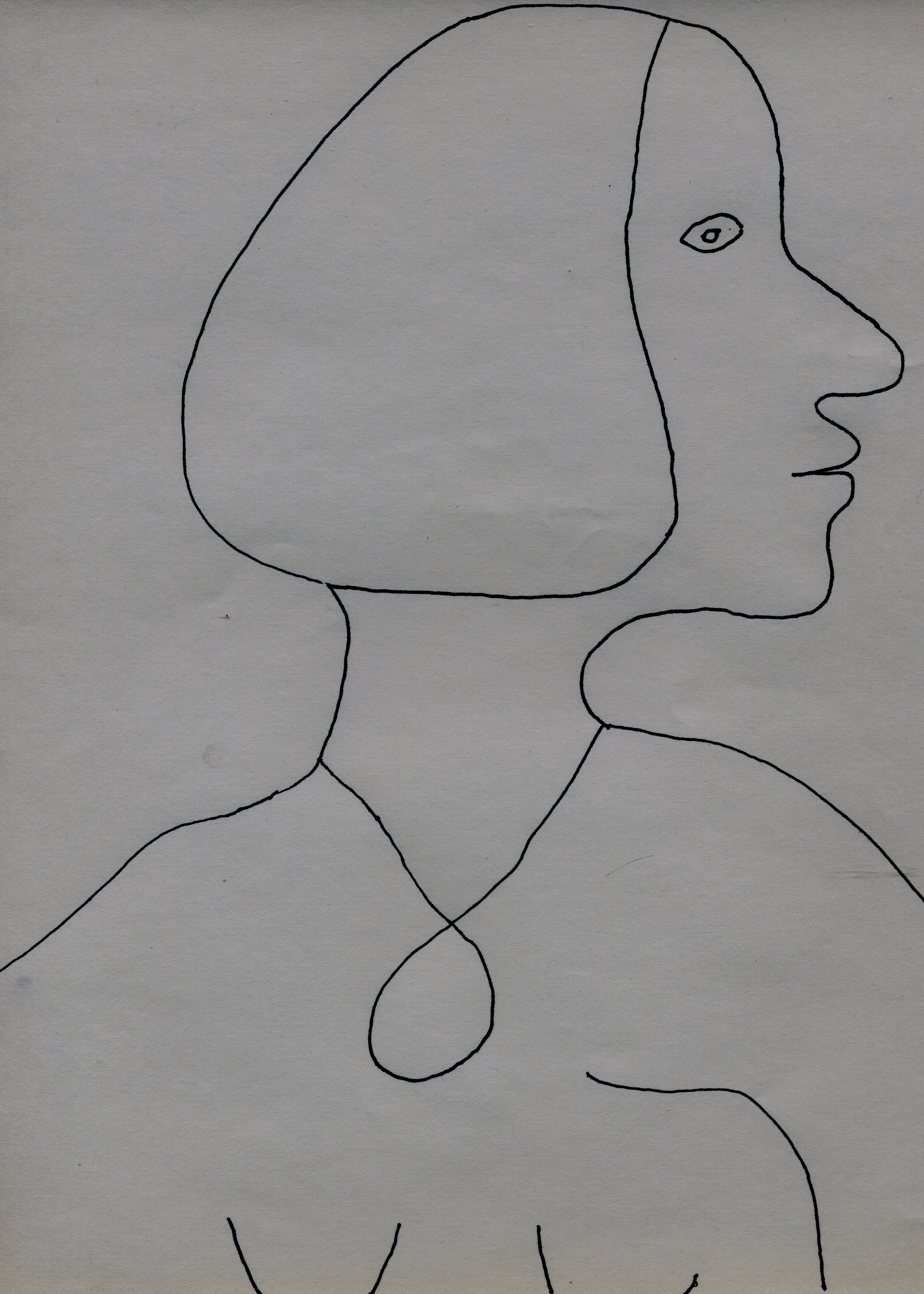
Period of the bubal: schematic sketch of a female figure, detail of a sexual scene of the station XXVIII

Some of the figures have a high cap in the shape of a rectangle, diamond or oval. One woman wears a semi-spherical headdress. The zoomorphic profiles, more or less identifiable, generally seem to be linked to sexual scenes. Several are cynocephalic, others have horns (station XVII), long hare ears (stations XXV and XXVI) or evoke felines (station XVII). One woman has a frog's head, another has ears as a head, both appear in a spread position.

The men's clothing can be evoked by a line at the level of the belt, a triangle whose summit, placed at the height of the belt, suggests a small cloth or skin cover (station XXI), a loincloth or a real cover whose extremities fall between the legs or on the buttocks (often mistaken for a phallus). About fifteen characters, with (station XXVII) or without a loincloth, are provided with enormous sexes. The genitals are never drawn, no phallic case having been met moreover. The Caballine period also presents numerous ithyphallic figures (notably at stations IV, VI, VII, XIII, XVIII, XXXIV, XXXIX).

The clothing of the women, whose breasts are often bare and whose hair is abundant, can be skirts which, tightened at the belt, go down a little above the ankle. Several figures have only a line on the belt (station XXIV), a band (station XXXVII) or a small triangular loincloth (station XXXI). At station L two diagonal bands cross the upper part of a female figure in the manner of suspenders.

Several representations are particularly noteworthy. At station VIII (Ahana Rock), a bell-shaped head (about 70 cm high) is surmounted by a bun, tight at the base, from which a sort of tuft in the form of two small opposing horns emerges. At station XXVII a woman (135 cm high) with a cynomorphic profile is holding a smaller character who could be a child. She wears a truncated cone-shaped hat on her head, striped with parallel bands, perhaps of spartan material. The neck seems to be caught in a narrow, elongated straitjacket. On the chest three lines evoke necklaces. The breasts are elongated and pendulous, above a long dress that descends clearly below the ankles.

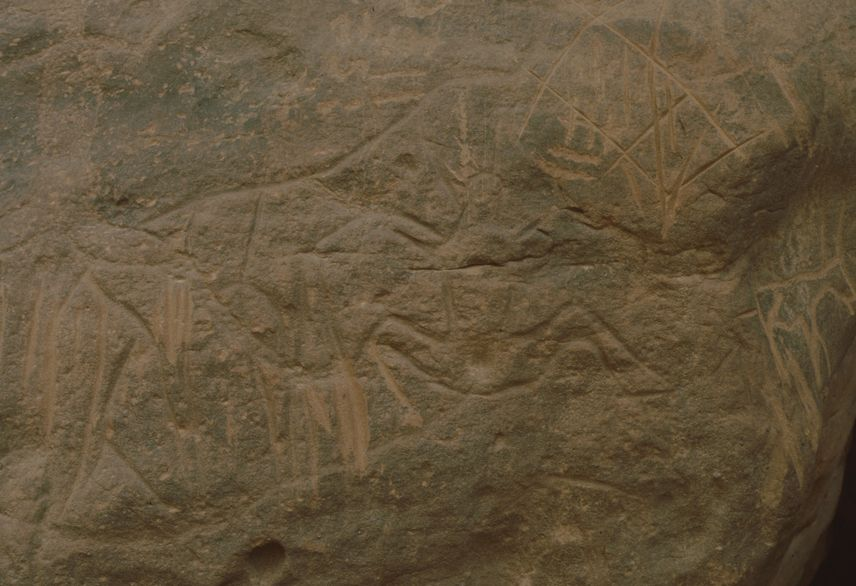
Female figure with highlighted vulva and other petroglyphs

In the engravings of Oued Djerat, sexual scenes are numerous. E.F. Gautier, one of the first to have studied them, considered in 1934 that they could not be "submitted to the French public because they would be considered pornographic". Henri Lhote distinguishes six groups: women "with legs bent and spread in a frog-like position, their sex in full view" (8 copies (Note: Several of these women, especially at station XXVIII, raise their arms in the manner of orants: "Were they some kind of vestals?" wonders the author, who attributes these figurations to the decadent Bubaline period and evokes the possibility of a fertility cult. (Ibid., p. 809))), women represented in the same posture "with associated phallus" (two examples), men in a similar position (three examples), "couples in coitus" (three scenes from the Bubaline period, a greater number from the Caballine period), the "scenes where the two sexes are entangled in a lustful way" as at station VIII of the Ahana rock and the "unnatural relationships" (hartebeest, explicitly, at station XXVII, giraffe at station XXX, rhinoceros, antelope at station XLIV). "André Malraux, at the sight of some of these images with zoomorphic heads, thought that they prefigured the zoomorphic gods of the Egyptian religion", reports Henri Lhote. "These relationships, unnatural in our eyes, could they not evoke certain myths in honor among African populations where animals play an essential role in the history of the creation of the world? And the human-animal relationships would not be at the origin of the most beautiful legends, illustrated today by the use of masks in non-Islamic black societies living south of the Sahara?". If no sexual scene appears in the engravings of the Bovidian period, whereas there are some in the paintings of Tassili, quite numerous are those which date from the Caballine period, the couplings remaining rare there.

War scenes are absent from the engravings of the Bubaline period, hunting scenes are rare. Five figurations show, contrary to what the first authors of the classifications thought, that the men of this period used the bow (stations XX, XXVII, XXXII), just like in the South Oranese or Fezzan. The position of the hunters' arms shows that they used a short bow, of the simple type, holding it in front of their bodies, without using the eye to aim. The axe is only shown in one example. Its shape is similar to those found in the South Oranese, which H. Lhote considers that they are, symbolically, "votive axes". The throwing stick seems to be represented but its identification remains doubtful. The dog may have been the hunters' helper. The hunting scenes (ostrich, rhinoceros, sheep or gazelle) show that this activity remained essential for the populations of Oued Djerat. One of them, at station XLVII, shows three men who, in order to capture a hartebeest, try to immobilize it by the horns with ties. Three other scenes, one of which is uncertain, associate men with elephants. Station LIV seems to show the capture of a baby elephant that is bending over to resist its driver, and station LXXIV shows a man leading a herd with a stick. An exceptional engraving shows a bovine mounted by a character (station LXXXIV). If the giraffe does not appear in any hunting scene in the Bubaline period, it is represented held on a leash in the Caballine period. No engraving evokes a trap. Figurations of fish may also suggest the practice of fishing. Although the ancient Neolithic populations of the central Sahara, in all likelihood, did not know agriculture per se, it is permissible, according to the author, to assume, from engravings located in other stations, that the harvesting of wild grasses was one of their activities.

Finally, some twenty engravings, the oldest of which date back to the Bubaline period, show outlines of feet, sandals (more than 900 at station III, recent or perhaps from the Caballine period) and hands, without it being possible to interpret their meaning. Among the other cultural elements of Wadi Djerat, there are 125 spirals, very unevenly distributed in 18 stations (station XXVIII alone has 50). Of various designs, some are single or double spiral, others show more complex compositions. Some of them are linked to animals.

== Relations with the rock engravings of the South Oranese and Fezzan ==
For Henri Lhote, the documents concerning the Bubaline period, in the South Oranese, Oued Djerat and Fezzan, are the oldest of the cave art of North Africa and the Sahara.

The relationships between the bubaline engravings of Wadi Djerat and those of Fezzan are obvious to the author. The style, the dimensional order of the subjects, the patina, the fauna represented are similar, although the species are more numerous in Djerat. The human representations show in both regions an identity for the zoomorphic heads, the same presence of sexual scenes, an analogy in the posture of women with spread legs. In Fezzan, however, the spirals are absent. "These few differences are insufficient not to recognize the common points between these two centers, which can be explained by their geographical proximity," observes Lhote.

Comparing according to the same criteria the bubaline engravings of Oued Djerat and those of the South Oranese, the author reaches the same conclusions, the absence of the hippopotamus and the giraffe among the figurations of the Saharan Atlas being able to be explained by hydrographic and geographical causes. The abundance of the ram in the bestiary South Oranese should, according to him, be put "in relation to the religious role" that he played essentially in the region. Other differences would be the absence of zoomorphic figures and scenes of coitus. In the decadent phase it is male crouching figures that we meet in the South Oranese, in Oued Djerat or Fezzan it is women, while in Constantinois both sexes are represented in this posture.

The three regions thus reveal "common attitudes that cannot be fortuitous", so that "it is not possible to doubt a certain unity between the three major centers of the period of Bubalus antiquus", concludes Lhote, specifying that "the great naturalistic engravings of the Hoggar, Kaouar, Tibesti, that we tend to assimilate to the Bubaline period, are later although arising from the same artistic school.

== Age and origin of the bubaline engravings of Oued Djerat ==
Henri Lhote recalls that no hearth allowing a radiometric measurement could be obtained in Oued Djerat. In Tassili, the hearth of a shelter where vestiges of painting from the "round head" period remained, which shows a fauna identical to that of the Hartebeest period, including this one, has however provided a dating of 5450 years B.C. In the South Oranese, the lithic industry deposit of the "Méandre", near Brezina, has been dated to 3900 years B.C., without it being possible to relate it to one of the categories of engravings on the wall, some of which are certainly more recent, while others may be older. The figure of 4000 years BC indicated by Vaufrey would thus be insufficient and should "be postponed by at least one millennium".

Raymond Vaufrey had issued in 1955 the hypothesis that the bubaline engravings of Tassili, South Oranese and Fezzan were related to the Neolithic of Capsian tradition whose origin is located in the region of Tebessa-Gafsa. From many arguments Henri Lhote considers that this hypothesis is to be rejected. For F. E. Roubet, summarizes Lhote "the study of the engravings of the Oranese South and the region of Tiaret highlights that the center of this art must be located in the South, that is to say in the mounts of Ksour and the Djebel Amour": "of there, it gained the North, those of the region of Tiaret being the most septentrional" and "it is thus not in Constantinois that it is necessary to seek the origin of it". At Safiet Bou Rhénane, in the Djelfa region, the dates obtained are 5020 and 5270 years B.C., for an industry that does not correspond to the Neolithic of the Capsian tradition but to a Mediterranean facies. According to Lhote, "the engraving stations located between those of the South Oranais and the South Constantinois, far from marking milestones between a center of origin, hypothetically in the region of Tebessa", reflect "on the contrary a late and decadent character, highlighted by several superimpositions, thus a movement of migration in the opposite direction". "The hypothesis of the Capsian origin of the Neolithic art of the South Oranais and the Sahara can not be validly retained," he summarizes.

In the last pages of his study, Henri Lhote returns to the separation made by several prehistorians between the engravings of the southern Oranese and those of the central Sahara and Tassili, supposed to derive from another center of civilization, some attached to the Neolithic of Capsian tradition, the others to a Neolithic of Sudanese tradition. "If it is true that the paintings of Tassili, Hoggar, Tibesti, Ennedi, are of an essence and another origin than the engravings of the Bubaline period, it is clear that we do not see on what criterion one would ecologically separate the three groups of archaic engravings, "he writes. For the populations of this bubaline period, "without report with those of the bovidian period, if not that they were able to see the domestication of the Ox", "it is impossible to go to look for their origin towards the East", the big naturalistic engravings representing the big wild fauna existing neither in the valley of the Nile nor in the neighbouring regions to the East or to the South of the river. It is therefore not towards Egypt that we must look for the origin of the bubaline art but in the original activities of the same ethnic group which "occupied, in the Neolithic, the pre-Saharan Atlas, the Constantinois, the Fezzan and the Tassili while these regions benefited from a very humid climate under which the great fauna, known as Ethiopian, could live without difficulty".

== See also ==
- Tassili n'Ajjer
