= Uan Tabu =

Rock shelter in Acacus Mountains, Libya

- Location in Libya
- 24.833°N 10.333°E
- Location: Libya, Central-Southern Tadrart Acacus

Uan Tabu is a rock shelter in the Tadrart Acacus mountains in Libya. It is located on the left bank of the ancient Wadi (river) Teshuinat. In modern day, it is located a few meters above the existing Wadi Teshuinat. The rock shelter is 50 meters (160 ft) wide and is 10 meters (33 ft) high and four meters deep. It is notable for its rock art and its important chronology and archaeology covering the period between about 61,000 and 7500 cal years BCE in the Sahara Desert.

Within the site, archaeologists found wooden structures, faunal remains, ostrich egg shell beads, potsherds, stone tools, and 10 hearths or combustion structures. The site provides evidence for human occupations dating to the Aterian (Upper Pleistocene), Early Acacus, Late Acacus, and Pastoral (Holocene) periods.

== Archaeological history ==
The first archaeological work was done at the site between 1960 and 1963, led by S. Tinè. The team dug a trench at the base of the rock shelter that they separated into distinct areas, a and b. This initial trench excavated the Holocene deposit. During this period, archaeologists uncovered wooden huts, charcoal, pottery, and stone tools. In 1990, archaeological work was resumed at the site. A second trench was dug adjacent to the 1960's trench. It was 255 cm deep and divided the stratigraphy into 25 layers, further grouping them into four main Units based on major soil composition and color differences. This excavation reached the site's Pleistocene deposits. Units I-III included artifacts and information from the Holocene pre-pastoral period, while Unit IV uncovered information about the Upper Pleistocene Aterian occupation of the site.

== Aterian ==
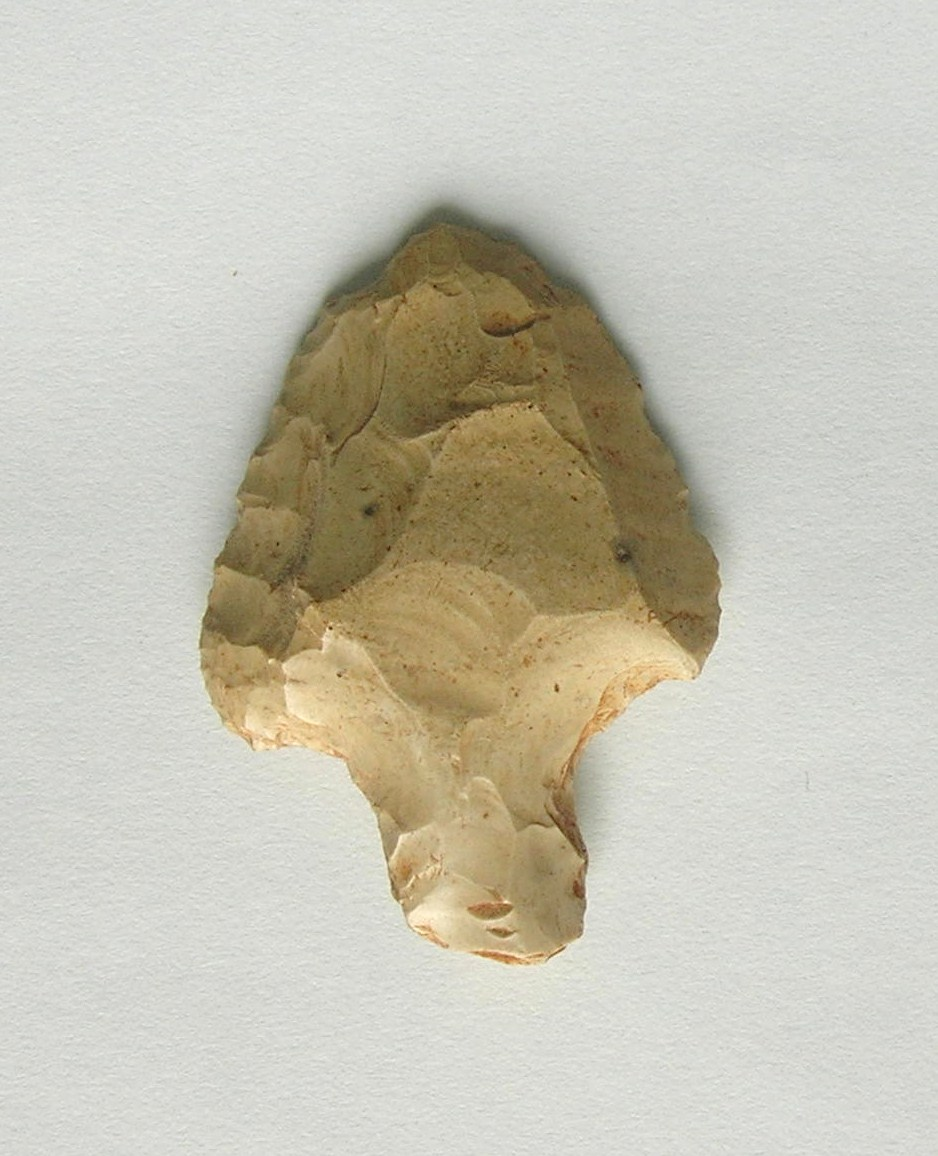
Example of an Aterian nosed point

Using Optically Stimulated Luminescence (OSL) dating on the deposits in the lower stratigraphic layers (Unit IV), archaeologists were able to date them to 61,000 ± 10,000 years old BP. This coincides with the arid climate that existed in the Libyan Sahara between 100,000 to 40,000 years ago. The layers above Unit IV are dated to 8,800 ± 100 years old, displaying a very large period of time with no human occupation at this site. The return of occupation at this site based on these upper Holocene dates aligns with a humid period in the Sahara.

Uan Tabu is the only site in the Central Sahara that is fully Aterian. Unlike other sites in the area, numerous Aterian stone tools were found at Uan Tabu in Unit IV. Some of the stone tools were retouched which could imply that the site was the location of a long term habituation. Unit IV can be divided into two distinct sections. The lower layers, 24 and 25, feature stone tools exclusively made of sandstone and Nubian cores are only present in these layers. There were also knives and tanged points and other tanged tools. The upper layers, 21-23, have lithics of different raw materials. In these layers Levallois point cores, flake cores and blades are found more frequently than at the lower layers. This supports the idea that later Aterian groups were less mobile than earlier ones and had time to develop tools.

By dating this fully Aterian site, archaeologists were able to gain more understanding on the movement of early anatomically modern humans throughout the Sahara. Both the evidence of Aterian technology and OSL dating show that there was occupation at this site during the Late Pleistocene's arid climate. Previously there was no evidence of either of these things existing in the Acacus Mountains of the Central Sahara.

== Acacus ==
=== Early Acacus ===
The Early Acacus at Uan Tabu dates from about 9300 to 8000 cal years BCE and was found within Unit III. Further analysis of the deposit material within Unit III, carried out in the 1990s, revealed new information about the environment and lifestyle of the people occupying the site.

Unit III consisted of mainly sand, silt, and organic matter that came from the outer part of the rock shelter. The analysis of the organic matter indicated a wet climate with lots of vegetation. In addition, low pollen concentration and poor preservation indicated a wetter, more humid climate. Since the rock shelter was on the river bank, there was lots of vegetation typically found in marshlands. Analysis of charcoal found at that site was primarily from the plant Tamarix which was prominent in the surrounding area, creating a wooded grassland and implying that there was a nearby shallow water table. The people occupying the site at the time were knowledgeable in plant uses and harvested the vegetation for resources like food and fibers.

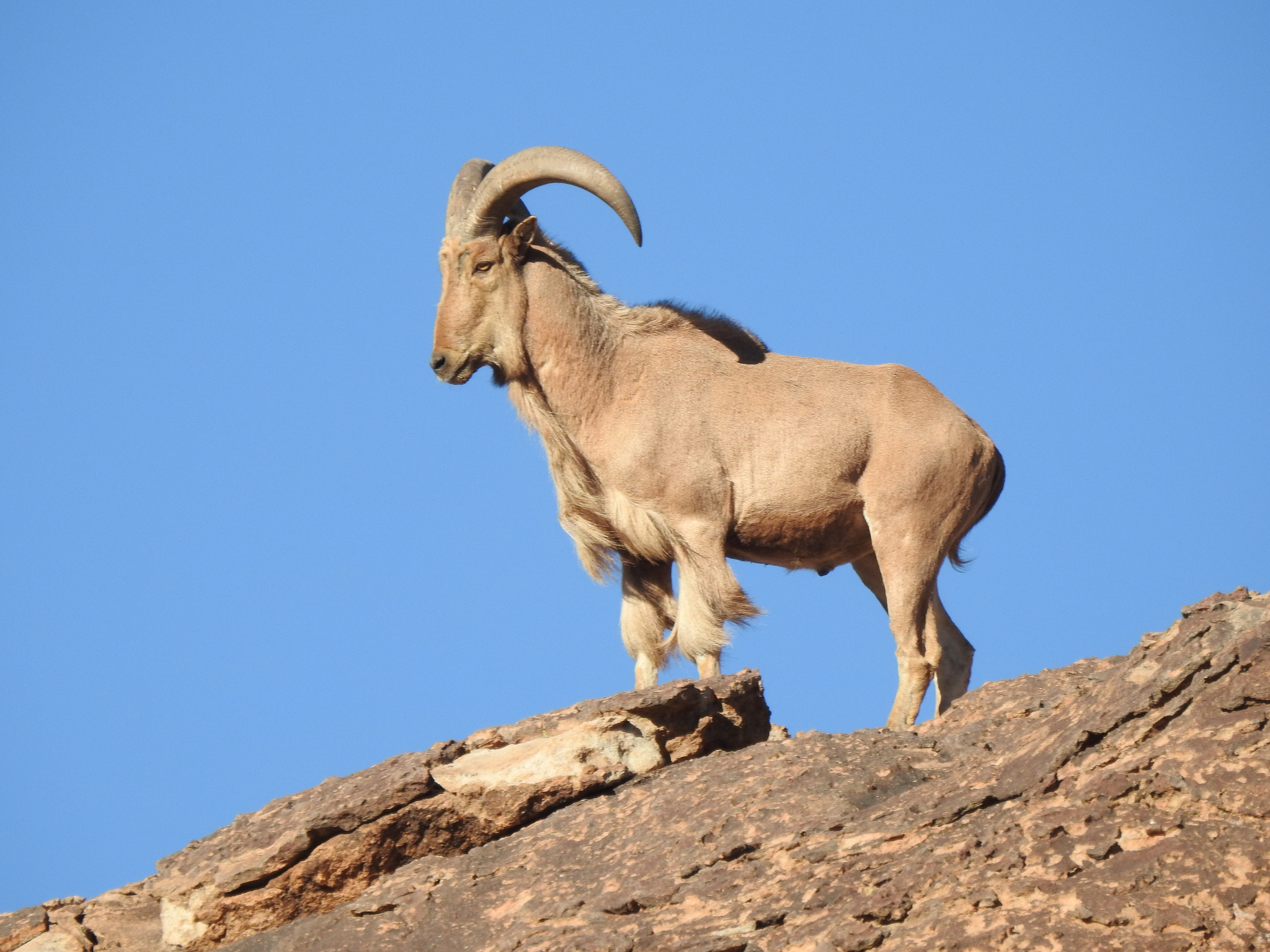
Barbary Sheep

During the Early Acacus, faunal remains indicate that Barbary Sheep were the main source of subsistence, which aligns with the evidence of this species' success at other sites in Northern Africa. The people inhabiting Uan Tabu were also likely herding and caging the Barbary Sheep based on the accumulation of spherulite, dung and plant layers.

=== Late Acacus ===
The Late Acacus at Uan Tabu dates from 8000 to 7500 cal years BCE. The Late Acacus deposit spanned Unit I and II, and was thicker than the Early Acacus deposit. Poorly decomposed organic material was very prominent in these Units indicating a drier climate than the earlier period. The drier climate resulted in lower water availability and a diversification of plant types and environments.

A notable discovery dating to this period was a wooden hut. The hut, as well as the artifacts made of perishable materials recovered from within, were excellently preserved due to the dry climate. Stone lithics were found in higher concentrations in the surrounding areas of the hut, implying that tool manufacturing was not often practiced within the hut. In addition, they found many pieces of pottery with roller stamp designs that were not from the Uan Tabu area. Not only does this display interregional trade, it implies that the pottery had a special social significance beyond practical use.

The remains of Barbary Sheep were less frequent in the Late Acacus. There is evidence of the accumulations of plants and the development of specialized uses of the vegetal resources they gathered. For example, the storage and abundance of wild grains, like Gramineae, suggested it was a food supply. The abundance of resources in this area allowed for increased knowledge in how to use the plants, as well as longer periods of occupation. The populations were likely using Uan Tabu as a seasonal occupation site.

== Pastoral ==
=== Early Pastoral ===
Evidence of Early Pastoral occupation at Uan Tabu is limited for a number of reasons. To begin, the extremely hyper arid climate of the early Holocene eroded the majority of artifacts. Also, the lifestyle of pastoral groups is highly nomadic resulting in very little debris being left behind in the places they stop. The only date from this period is taken from a radiocarbon date from 1960: 7045 ± 175 years ago BP (6250-5620 cal BCE).

Despite the poor evidence of Early Pastoral occupation, archaeologists are certain that these groups did frequent the site. There were potsherds present at the site that could be attributed to this period. These are easily differentiable from pottery of the Late Acacus period. All the pottery from this period is made of material that originate from Uan Tabu. This is different from the pots of earlier periods that were likely imported from other areas. Further, the rock art found at the site aligns with the Pastoral phase of Saharan rock art. The rock art in the shelter displays a herd of cattle and was painted on top of rock art from the Round Head phase of rock art. This is important because rock art is rare in the Sahara, making this site an important reference frame in creating a timeline of the period.

Two bone tools from this period are likely from domesticated cattle. Domesticated cattle were brought to the area by other populations and were not domesticated at the site. Their presence does indicate the development of a social system where cattle represented wealth, possibly facilitating the start of social hierarchies.

=== Late Pastoral ===
The Late Pastoral period at Uan Tabu is dated to 2470-2000 cal BCE. Archaeologists were able to obtain dung stuck in the wall of the shelter. Similar to the Early Pastoral period, artifacts from this period were destroyed by wind erosion resulting from the very arid climate. Few artifacts that were discovered, suggesting that human populations were frequenting the site sporadically.

The dung in the wall included well preserved pollen that archaeologists were able to test to learn more about the environment during the Late Pastoral at Uan Tabu. The increased presence of plants like Chenopodiaceae indicates that the environment was very dry with a possible higher frequency of sand dunes, very similar to the current landscape. Further, the dung allowed archaeologists to glean that populations in this period took care of small herds of cattle. The pollen in the dung displayed accumulation of different plants and a broken down composition similar to that of other herbivores.This increased use of herding cattle is considered to be a reason for the rapid desertification of the area.
