= Haplogroup N1a (mtDNA) =

Human mitochondrial DNA haplogroup

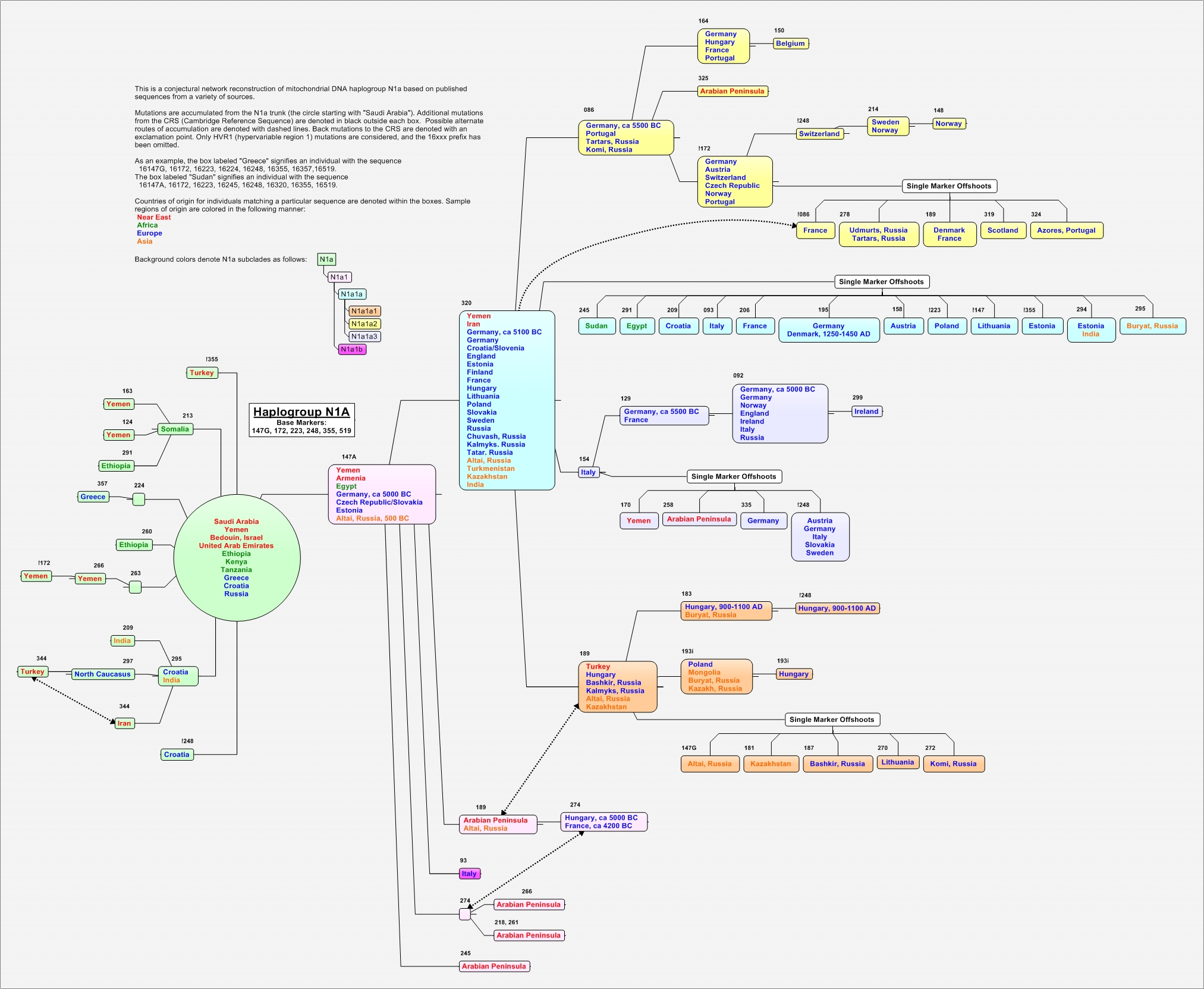
- Possible time of origin: 12,000-32,000 YBP
- Possible place of origin: Near East
- Ancestor: N1a'e'I
- Descendants: N1a1
- Defining mutations: 152, 669, 2702, 5315, 8901, 16147G, 16172, 16248, 16355

Haplogroup N1a is a human mitochondrial DNA (mtDNA) haplogroup.

== Origin ==
N1a originated in the Near East 12,000 to 32,000 years ago. Specifically, the Arabian Peninsula is postulated as the geographic origin of N1a. This supposition is based on the relatively high frequency and genetic diversity of N1a in modern populations of the peninsula. Exact origins and migration patterns of this haplogroup are still subject of some debate.

=== Debate on Origin of Neolithic Europeans ===
Two main competing scenarios exist for the spread of the Neolithic package from the Near East to Europe: demic diffusion (in which agriculture was brought by farmers) or cultural diffusion (in which agriculture was spread through the passage of ideas).

N1a became particularly prominent in this debate when a team led by Wolfgang Haak analyzed skeletons from Linear Pottery Culture sites. The Linear Pottery Culture is credited with the first farming communities in Central Europe, marking the beginning of Neolithic Europe in the region some 7500 years ago. As of 2010, mitochondrial DNA analysis has been conducted on 42 specimens from five locations. Seven of these ancient individuals were found to belong to haplogroup N1a

A separate study analyzed 22 skeletons from European hunter-gatherer sites dated 13400-2300 BC. Most of these fossils carried the mtDNA haplogroup U, which was not found in any of the Linear Pottery Culture sites. Conversely, N1a was not identified in any of the hunter-gatherer fossils, indicating a genetic distinction between Early European Farmers and late European hunter-gatherers.

Haak's team concludes that "the transition to farming in central Europe was accompanied by a substantial influx of people from outside the region." However, they note that haplogroup frequencies in modern Europeans are substantially different from early farming and late hunter-gatherer populations. This indicates that "the diversity observed today cannot be explained by admixture between hunter-gatherers and early farmers alone" and that "major demographic events continued to take place in Europe after the early Neolithic."

Critics of these studies claim that the LBK N1a specimens could have derived from local communities established in Europe before the introduction of farming. Ammerman's team voiced concern due to some of the LBK specimens coming from communities several hundred years after farming was first established in the region; a rebuttal was given.

In 2010, researchers led by Palanichamy conducted a genetic and phylogeographic analysis of N1a. Based on the results, they conclude that some of the LBK samples were indigenous to Europe while others may have resulted from 'leapfrog' colonization. Deguilloux's team agreed with Haak's conclusion on a genetic discontinuity between ancient and modern Europeans. However, they consider demic diffusion, cultural diffusion, and long-distance matrimonial exchanges all equally plausible explanations for the current genetic findings.

== Ancient DNA ==
Seven of 42 skeletons from Linear Pottery Culture (Linearbandkeramik) sites were found to be members of the N1a haplogroup (see Neolithic European). N1a was also identified in skeletal remains within a 6200-year-old megalithic long mound near Prissé-la-Charrière, France. A 2500-year-old fossil of a Scytho-Siberian in the Altai Republic, easternmost representative of the Scythians, was found to be a member of N1a1. A study of a 10th and 11th century Hungarians found that N1a1a1 was present in high-status individuals but absent from commoners. One of thirteen skeletons analyzed from a medieval cemetery dated 1250-1450 AD in Denmark was found to be a member of subclade N1a1a.

The N1 subclade has also been found in various other fossils that were analysed for ancient DNA, including specimens associated with the Starčevo (N1a1a1, Alsónyék-Bátaszék, Mérnöki telep, 1/3 or 33%), Linearbandkeramik (N1a1a1a3, Szemely-Hegyes, 1/1 or 100%; N1a1b/N1a1a3/N1a1a1a2/N1a1a1/N1a1a1a, Halberstadt-Sonntagsfeld, 6/22 or ~27%), Alföld Linear Pottery (N1a1a1, Hejőkürt-Lidl, 1/2 or 50%), Transdanubian Late Neolithic (N1a1a1a, Apc-Berekalja, 1/1 or 100%), Protoboleráz (N1a1a1a3, Abony, Turjányos-dűlő, 1/4 or 25%), Iberia Early Neolithic cultures (N1a1a1, Els Trocs, 1/4 or 25%), Rinaldone-Gaudo Eneolithic cultures (N1a1a1a3, Monte San Biagio, 1/1 or 100%).

== Distribution ==
Haplogroup N1a is widely distributed throughout Europe, Northeast Africa, the Near East and Central Asia. It is divided into the European/Central Asian and African/South Asian branches based on specific genetic markers.

=== Near East ===
Relatively high frequencies of N1a are found in the modern population of Saudi Arabia. Estimates range from 2.4% to 4%. Regional analysis revealed that the haplogroup was most common in the center of the country. Haplotype diversity is noted for being higher here than elsewhere.

Frequencies of N1a in Yemen are relatively high, with estimates varying by study: 3.6%, 5.2%, and 6.9%. Yemen is noted for high haplotype diversity within the population.

Elsewhere in the Near East, prevalence of N1a is lower. A 2008 article cited population frequencies of 1.1% in Qatar, 0.3% in Iran, and 0.2% in Turkey.

=== Europe ===
N1a is a rare haplogroup that currently appears in only 0.2% of European populations. Pockets of higher frequencies exist such as in Croatia where 0.7% of mainland Croatians, 9.24% of the population on the island of Cres, and 1.9% of the population on the island of Brač are members of N1a. In the Volga-Ural region of Russia, N1a is most prominent in the Komi-Permyaks (9.5%) followed by the Bashkirs (3.6%), Chuvash (1.8%), and Tatars (0.4%). In another study of Volga Tatars, haplogroup N1a was found in 1.6% (2/126) of a sample of Mishar Tatars from Buinsk in western Tatarstan (1/126 N1a1a1a1, 1/126 N1a3a3), but it was not observed in a sample of 71 Kazan Tatars from Aznakayevo in eastern Tatarstan, yielding an overall figure of 1.0% N1a (2/197) among Volga Tatars. Russia as a whole has a frequency of 0.7%.

A study of 542 individuals in Portugal found an N1a frequency of 0.37%. Only 0.11% of individuals analyzed in Scotland were members of the haplogroup.

=== Asia ===
Analysis of modern Siberian populations revealed a 1.2% prevalence in Altaians, 0.2% in the Buryats, and 0.9% in the Khanty people.

In India, N1a was identified in 4 members of the Havik group, 2 members from Andhra Pradesh, 2 members from West Bengal and 1 member from Tamil Nadu. The members of the Havik group belong to the African/South Asian branch while one member from Andhra Pradesh and others from West Bengal and Tamil Nadu belong to the European Branch.

Haplogroup N1a1 has been observed in 2.9% (4/138) of a sample of Kyrgyz from Kizilsu Kyrgyz Autonomous Prefecture, Xinjiang, China.

=== Africa ===
N1a is concentrated among Afro-Asiatic-speaking populations in Northeast Africa, occurring in Eritrea, Ethiopia, Kenya, Tanzania, Somalia and Sudan. The clade also occurs at very low frequencies among a few neighboring groups due to historical interactions. In Sudan, it is found among the Arakien (5.9%) and Nubians (3.4%). In Ethiopia, 2.2% of the population are N1a carriers, with the haplogroup identified amongst Semitic speakers. In Egypt, N1a has been observed in 0.8% of inhabitants. In Kenya, the haplogroup is carried by around 10% of the Cushitic-speaking Rendille, as well as 1% of the Maasai. Some N1a has also been observed in Tanzania.

Additionally, haplogroup N1a is found among the Socotri (6.2%).

== Subclades ==
=== Tree ===
This phylogenetic tree of haplogroup N1a subclades is based on the paper by Mannis van Oven and Manfred Kayser Updated comprehensive phylogenetic tree of global human mitochondrial DNA variation and subsequent published research.

- N
  - N1'5
    - N1
      - N1a'c'd'e'I
        - N1a'd'e'I
          - N1a'e'I
            - N1a
              - N1a1
                - N1a1a
                  - N1a1a1
                    - N1a1a1a
                  - N1a1a2
                  - N1a1a3
                - N1a1b

The tree of N1a has two distinct branches: Africa/South Asia and Europe with a Central Asian subcluster. However, the African branch has members in southern Europe, and the European branch has members in Egypt and the Near East. The Africa/South Asia branch is characterized by the 16147G mutation, whereas the European branch is characterized by 16147A, 3336 and 16320. The Central Asian subcluster is an offshoot of the European branch that is characterized by marker 16189.

Subclade N1a1 is associated with mutation 16147A. Palanichamy calculates N1a1 to have emerged between 8900 and 22400 YBP (Years Before Present). Subclade N1a1a is denoted by marker 16320, and is therefore associated with the European N1a branch. Petraglia estimates that N1a1a arose between 11000 and 25000 YBP.

== See also ==
- Genealogical DNA test
- Genetic Genealogy
- Human mitochondrial genetics
- Population Genetics
- Human mitochondrial DNA haplogroups

Phylogenetic tree of human mitochondrial DNA (mtDNA) haplogroups

Mitochondrial Eve (L)

L0
L1–6

L1
L2

L3

L4
L5
L6
M
N

CZ
D
E
G
Q

O
A
S
R

I
W
X
Y
C
Z
B
F
R0

pre-JT

P

U
HV
JT
K
H
V
J
T
