= Haplogroup K1a1b1a (mtDNA) =

Human mitochondrial DNA haplogroup

- Possible time of origin: 4,800 ± 3,600 Years Ago
- Possible place of origin: Europe, potentially Southern Europe
- Ancestor: K1a1b1
- Defining mutations: A10978G T12954C C16234T

In human mitochondrial genetics, Haplogroup K1a1b1a is a human mitochondrial DNA (mtDNA) haplogroup.

The K1a1b1a mitochondrial DNA haplogroup subclade is found in Ashkenazi Jews and other populations. It is a subclade under haplogroup U'K.

== Origin ==
According to National Geographic Society's Genographic Project, K1a1b1a has an unknown origin. Its website has stated, "Though the origin of this lineage is not clear, it is a founding population among some Jewish Diaspora groups. Among Ashkenazi Jews, it is about 19 percent of maternal lineages." Estimates of the age of K1a1b1a vary depending on the mutation rates used. The age of K1a1b1a has been estimated at 4,800 ± 3,600 years ago, according to the Genographic Project.

The K1a1b1a subclade is under the U'K haplogroup and descends from K1a1b1, which is thought to be an 11,500-year-old European subclade of mostly non-Jewish origins. Haplogroup K falls under the old U8 grouping. Some of the Basque people of Spain and France fall under the U8a subclade within U8. K1a1b1a is a U8b subclade within U8, with several downstream variations.

By the time of Build 17, released on February 18, 2016, van Oven's phylogenetic tree PhyloTree updated its definition of K1a1b1a. Now, it requires the presence of the markers 10978 and 12954 in the coding region, and 16234 in the first hypervariable region (HVR1). The mutations involved are written out as A10978G (meaning A transitioned to G), T12954C (meaning T transitioned to C), and C16234T (meaning C transitioned to T). The definition of K1a1b1a no longer requires the mutation (C114T) on the highly polymorphic marker 114 in the second hypervariable region (HVR2). In Build 3, K1a1b1a had been defined by (114), 10978, and 16234 but did not need 12954. In Build 17, (C114T) appears as part of the definition of K1a1 instead. A minority of K1a1b1a carriers, such as JQ702155 and JQ703012, are missing (C114T).

== Distribution ==
10% of Europeans fall under the K haplogroup. It is hypothesized that the subclade represents one of four major founding maternal lineages ("founding mothers") of Ashkenazi Jews which together account for 45% of all Ashkenazi mtDNA haplotypes. Approximately 19% of Ashkenazi Jews with ancestry from Poland are in mtDNA haplogroup K1a1b1a. However, K1a1b1a has also been found in individuals of no known Jewish ancestry, and the explanation will require further research. The Genographic Project along with other research groups are looking into this phenomenon. The haplogroup is distributed in Europe and the Middle East. Estimates suggest approximately 1,600,000 Jews worldwide would be K1a1b1a.

The field of genetic genealogy and DNA sequencing has permitted ordinary people to make use of DNA testing to establish some evidence for their ancestral origins. Thousands of Family Tree DNA customers have submitted their mtDNA sequences for use in scientific studies, including those led by Behar and Brook. Additional samples were provided by the National Laboratory for the Genetics of Israeli Populations. Accordingly, based on the research of Behar, some connection has been established between the K1a1b1a subclade and Jewish ancestry. Aside from Ashkenazi Jews, K1a1b1a is also found in multiple communities of Sephardic Jews from Italy, Turkey, and southeastern Europe along with Baghdadi Jews from India and Paradesi Jews from India. It is also present among the Xueta people of Spain. The notion of Romani origins for K1a1b1a is impossible, given the much greater genetic diversity of K1a1b1a in Jews and the fact that this haplogroup was already widespread in Jewish populations by the 14th century. The presence of K1a1b1a in Romani people in Poland is the result of introgression into a Romani population.

A growing number of GenBank samples support the observations of mutations and population distributions described above.

GenBank Submissions
GenBank ID	Origin	Ethnicity	Author(s)
DQ301789	U/N	Ashkenazi	Behar, D. et al.
DQ301795	U/N	Ashkenazi	Behar, D. et al.
DQ301802	U/N	Ashkenazi	Behar, D. et al.
DQ301803	U/N	Ashkenazi	Behar, D. et al.
DQ301805	U/N	Ashkenazi	Behar, D. et al.
DQ301813	U/N	Ashkenazi	Behar, D. et al.
EU052292	U/N	U/N	Greenspan, B. (FTDNA)
EU170362	U/N	U/N	Greenspan, B. (FTDNA)
EU259709	U/N	U/N	Greenspan, B. (FTDNA)
EU327782	Zhitomir, Ukraine	Ukrainian	Greenspan, B. (FTDNA)
EU523126	U/N	U/N	Greenspan, B. (FTDNA)
EU862197	USA	European	Greenspan, B. (FTDNA)
EU926147	Pruzhany, Belarus	Ashkenazi	Greenspan, B. (FTDNA)
FJ228404	Fălticeni, Romania	Ashkenazi	Greenspan, B. (FTDNA)
FJ938288	Brest, Belarus	Ashkenazi	Greenspan, B. (FTDNA)
GU320192	USA	Romanian	Greenspan, B. (FTDNA)
GU571200	Frankfurt am Main, Germany	Ashkenazi	Greenspan, B. (FTDNA)
GU585492	U/N	U/N	Greenspan, B. (FTDNA)
GU722599	Bonn, Germany	Ashkenazi	Greenspan, B. (FTDNA)
GU723693	Kraków, Poland	Ashkenazi	Greenspan, B. (FTDNA)
HM101136	Netherlands	Ashkenazi	Greenspan, B. (FTDNA)
HQ667591	Budapest, Hungary	Ashkenazi	Greenspan, B. (FTDNA)
HQ901176	USA	Jewish	Greenspan, B. (FTDNA)
JN990448	USA	Ashkenazi	Greenspan, B. (FTDNA)
JQ702155	Hungary	U/N	Behar, D. et al.
JQ702245	U/N	U/N	Behar, D. et al.
JQ702671	Ukraine	Ashkenazi	Behar, D. et al.
JQ702676	Uzbekistan	Ashkenazi	Behar, D. et al.
JQ702755	Poland	U/N	Behar, D. et al.
JQ702780	Belarus	Ashkenazi	Behar, D. et al.
JQ702859	Lithuania	U/N	Behar, D. et al.
JQ702945	Russia	Ashkenazi	Behar, D. et al.
JQ703012	Russia	Ashkenazi	Behar, D. et al.
JQ703069	U/N	Ashkenazi	Behar, D. et al.
JQ703165	U/N	U/N	Behar, D. et al.
JQ703308	U/N	U/N	Behar, D. et al.
JQ703485	U/N	U/N	Behar, D. et al.
JQ703662	Ukraine	U/N	Behar, D. et al.
JQ703855	Germany	U/N	Behar, D. et al.
JQ704216	U/N	U/N	Behar, D. et al.
JQ704654	Germany	U/N	Behar, D. et al.
JQ704812	U/N	U/N	Behar, D. et al.
JQ705016	Poland	Ashkenazi	Behar, D. et al.
JQ705204	Germany	U/N	Behar, D. et al.
JQ705568	Ukraine	Ashkenazi	Behar, D. et al.
JQ705628	Ukraine	Ashkenazi	Behar, D. et al.
JQ705745	Lithuania	Ashkenazi	Behar, D. et al.
JQ705951	U/N	Ashkenazi	Behar, D. et al.
JQ705979	U/N	U/N	Behar, D. et al.
JQ706006	U/N	U/N	Behar, D. et al.
JX153534	Denmark	U/N	Raule, N. et al.
KC878724	Campania, Italy	U/N	Costa, M. et al.
KC914580	USA	Ashkenazi	Greenspan, B. (FTDNA)
KF435080	USA	Jewish	Greenspan, B. (FTDNA)
KM047228	Poland	U/N	Skonieczna, K. et al.
KR491936	USA	Ashkenazi	Greenspan, B. (FTDNA)
KT946594	Great Britain, UK	U/N	Lee, W.T.Y. et al.
KX350098	Spain	U/N	Iglesias, E.
KY782247	Poland	U/N	Malyarchuk, B. et al.
MH120573	Poland	U/N	Piotrowska-Nowak, A. et al.
MH120671	Poland	U/N	Piotrowska-Nowak, A. et al.
MN176259	Poland	U/N	Piotrowska-Nowak, A.
MZ386799	USA	U/N	Taylor, C.R. et al.
MZ387869	USA	U/N	Taylor, C.R. et al.
OL638845	Brazil	U/N	Speransa, P.A. et al.
PP153372	Mumbai, India	Baghdadi Jewish	Brook, K.A. et al.
PQ249398	Balta, Ukraine	Ashkenazi	Brook, K.A. et al.
PQ435234	Staszów, Poland	Ashkenazi	Brook, K.A. et al.
PV893137	Berezhnytsia, Ukraine	Ashkenazi	Brook, K.A. et al.
PX114822	Romania	Ashkenazi	Brook, K.A. et al.
PX238419	Kalvarija, Lithuania	Ashkenazi	Brook, K.A. et al.
PX315730	Węgrów, Poland	Ashkenazi	Brook, K.A. et al.
PX413589	Rotterdam, Netherlands	Ashkenazi	Brook, K.A. et al.

It may be recognized in hypervariable-only samples by the following essential mutations:

- Hypervariable region 1: 16224C, 16234T, 16311C, 16519C
- Hypervariable region 2: 073G, 263G, 315.1C, 497T

== Pre-Modern K1a1b1a samples ==
Medieval Jews
ID	Origin	Ethnicity	Period	Author(s)
I13861	Erfurt, Germany	Ashkenazi Jewish (Erfurt-ME)	14th century	Waldman, S. et al.
I13862	Erfurt, Germany	West Knaanic Jewish (Erfurt-EU)	14th century	Waldman, S. et al.
I13866	Erfurt, Germany	West Knaanic Jewish (Erfurt-EU)	14th century	Waldman, S. et al.
I13867	Erfurt, Germany	Ashkenazi Jewish (Erfurt-ME)	14th century	Waldman, S. et al.
I13870	Erfurt, Germany	Ashkenazi Jewish (Erfurt-ME)	14th century	Waldman, S. et al.
I14736	Erfurt, Germany	Ashkenazi Jewish (Erfurt-ME)	14th century	Waldman, S. et al.
I14741	Erfurt, Germany	Ashkenazi Jewish (Erfurt-ME)	14th century	Waldman, S. et al.
I14846	Erfurt, Germany	Jewish	14th century	Waldman, S. et al.
I14851	Erfurt, Germany	Ashkenazi Jewish (Erfurt-ME)	14th century	Waldman, S. et al.
I14899	Erfurt, Germany	Jewish	14th century	Waldman, S. et al.
I14903	Erfurt, Germany	Ashkenazi Jewish (Erfurt-ME)	14th century	Waldman, S. et al.
ROQ12	Tàrrega, Spain	Catalonian Jew	14th century	Pallarés-Viña, L. et al.

== Notable individuals with Haplogroup K1a1b1a ==
- Singer and pianist Harry Connick Jr.
- Actress and singer Tovah Feldshuh
- Novelist and journalist Keith Gessen
- Broadcaster and journalist Ramona Koval
- Businessman and author Seth Godin
- Futurist Donald Prell

== Subclades ==
=== Tree ===
This phylogenetic tree of haplogroup K subclades is based on the paper by Mannis van Oven and Manfred Kayser Updated comprehensive phylogenetic tree of global human mitochondrial DNA variation and subsequent published research.

- K1a1b1 11470G
  - K1a1b1a 10978G 12954C 16234T
  - K1a1b1b 593C 2483C
    - K1a1b1b1 789C 11620G
  - K1a1b1c 5585A 16222T
  - K1a1b1d 14388G 16092C 16223T
  - K1a1b1e 9932A
  - K1a1b1f 4823C 6528T 8842C
  - K1a1b1g 5583T 12007A

== See also ==
- Genealogical DNA test
- Genetic Genealogy
- Human mitochondrial genetics
- Population Genetics
- Human mitochondrial DNA haplogroups

Phylogenetic tree of human mitochondrial DNA (mtDNA) haplogroups

Mitochondrial Eve (L)

L0
L1–6

L1
L2

L3

L4
L5
L6
M
N

CZ
D
E
G
Q

O
A
S
R

I
W
X
Y
C
Z
B
F
R0

pre-JT

P

U
HV
JT
K
H
V
J
T
