= Haplogroup M8 =

Human mitochondrial DNA haplogroup

- Possible time of origin: 34,400 YBP
- Possible place of origin: East Asia
- Ancestor: M
- Descendants: M8a, CZ
- Defining mutations: A4715G C7196a G8584A A15487t T16298C

In human mitochondrial genetics, Haplogroup M8 is a human mitochondrial DNA (mtDNA) haplogroup.

== Origin ==
Haplogroup M8 is a descendant of haplogroup M. Haplogroup M8 is divided into subclades M8a, C and Z.

== Distribution ==
It is an East Asian haplogroup. Today, haplogroup M8 is found at its highest frequency in indigenous populations of East Siberia such as Evenk and Yukaghir. Haplogroup M8 is one of the most common mtDNA haplogroups among Yakut, Tuvan. Haplogroup C, the most major one of three subclades, is highly distributed among the Amerindian and Indigenous peoples of East Siberia. Haplogroup Z, another one of three subclades, is highly distributed among Even from Kamchatka (8/39 Z1a2a, 3/39 Z1a3, 11/39 = 28.2% Z total). mtDNA Haplogroup M8a, a not well known one of the three subclades, is highly distributed among Northern Han Chinese from Liaoning (16/317 = 5.0%).

=== Table of Frequencies by ethnic group ===
Population	Frequency	Count	Source	Subclades
Yakut	0.407	378	Pakendorf 2006	C=153, Z=1
Mongolian	0.277	47	Jin 2009	M8a=1, C=10, Z=2
Xibe (Xinjiang)	0.145	137		C=13, Z=7
Han Chinese (Liaoning)	0.120	317		M8a=16, C=14, Z=8
Korean (Chungcheong)	0.103	117		-
Han Chinese (Shandong)	0.099	393		M8a=8, C=14, Z=17
Han Chinese (Shanghai)	0.097	51		M8a=7, C=5, Z=2
Han Chinese (Henan)	0.086	208		M8a=9, C=7, Z=2
Korean (Gangwon)	0.079	114		-
Manchurian	0.075	40	Jin 2009	M8a=1, C=1, Z=1
Korean (Gyeongsang)	0.071	112		-
Korean (Seoul)	0.067	134		-
Korean (Jeolla)	0.059	118		-
Korean (Gwangju)	0.033	60		M8a=2
Japanese	0.032	1312	Tanaka 2004	M8a=18, C=7, Z=17
Vietnamese	0.029	35		-
Han Chinese (South)	0.026	78		-
Korean (Jeju Island)	0.009	113		-
Okinawan	0.003	326	Umetsu 2005	CZ=1
Taiwan Aboriginal	0.000	640	Trejaut 2005	-
Philippines	0.000	59	Tajima 2004	-

== Subclades ==
Haplogroup C, the most major one of three subclades is highly distributed among the Amerindian and Indigienous peoples of East Siberia. Haplogroup Z, the other one of three subclades is highly distributed among Even from Kamchatka (8/39 Z1a2a, 3/39 Z1a3, 11/39 = 28.2% Z total), mtDNA Haplogroup M8a, not well known one of three subclades is highly distributed among Northern Han Chinese from Liaoning (16/317 = 5.0%).

=== Tree ===
This phylogenetic tree of haplogroup M8 subclades is based on the paper by Mannis van Oven and Manfred Kayser Updated comprehensive phylogenetic tree of global human mitochondrial DNA variation and subsequent published research.

- M8
  - M8a
    - M8a1 - Ulch
      - M8a1a - Japanese
    - M8a2'3
      - M8a2 - Japanese, Han Chinese
      - M8a2-a* - Japanese, Russia
        - M8a2a'b (T152C!) - Japanese
          - M8a2a - Han Chinese
            - M8a2a1 - Japanese, Han Chinese(Hunan)
              - M8a2a1a1
            - M8a2a1b
            - M8a2a1c - Japanese
          - M8a2b - Japanese, Han Chinese (Shandong)
            - M8a2b1
            - M8a2b2 - Russia
        - M8a2c - Japanese, Han Chinese
        - M8a2d - Han Chinese
        - M8a2e - Ami(Taiwan Aborigines), Han Chinese (Taiwan)
      - M8a3 - Japanese, Han Chinese
        - M8a3a - Han Chinese
          - M8a3a1 - Han Chinese
  - CZ
    - C
      - C1
        - C1a - Ulch, Swedish
        - C1b - Amerindian
          - C1b1
          - C1b2
          - C1b3
          - C1b4
          - C1b5
            - C1b5a
            - C1b5b
          - C1b6
          - C1b7'10 (T16311C!)
            - C1b7
              - C1b7a
            - C1b10
          - C1b8
          - C1b9
          - C1b11
          - C1b12
          - C1b13
            - C1b13a
              - C1b13a1
            - C1b13b
            - C1b13c
              - C1b13c1
            - C1b13d
            - C1b13e
          - C1b14
        - C1c - Amerindian
          - C1c1
            - C1c1a
            - C1c1b
          - C1c2
          - C1c3
          - C1c4
          - C1c5
          - C1c6'7
            - C1c6
            - C1c7
          - C1c8
        - C1d - Amerindian
          - C1d1
            - C1d1a
              - C1d1a1
            - C1d1b
              - C1d1b1
            - C1d1c
              - C1d1c1
            - C1d1d
          - C1d2
            - C1d2a
          - C1d3
        - C1e - Amerindian
        - C1f - Amerindian
      - C4 - Siberian, Mongolian, Han Chinese
        - C4a'b'c
          - C4a
            - C4a1
              - C4a1a
                - C4a1a1
                  - C4a1a1a
                - C4a1a2'3'4
                  - C4a1a2
                    - C4a1a2a
                  - C4a1a3
                    - C4a1a3a
                      - C4a1a3a1
                    - C4a1a3b
                    - C4a1a3c
                    - C4a1a3d
                  - C4a1a4
                    - C4a1a4a
                - C4a1a5
                - C4a1a6
            - C4a2
              - C4a2a
                - C4a2a1
                  - C4a2a1a
                  - C4a2a1b
              - C4a2b
                - C4a2b1
                - C4a2b2
                  - C4a2b2a
              - C4a2c
                - C4a2c1
                - C4a2c2
                  - C4a2c2a
          - C4b
            - C4b1
              - C4b1a
              - C4b1b
            - C4b2
              - C4b2a
            - C4b3
              - C4b3a
                - C4b3a1
              - C4b3b
            - C4b5
            - C4b6
            - C4b7
            - C4b8
              - C4b8a
          - C4c
            - C4c1
              - C4c1a
              - C4c1b
            - C4c2
        - C4d'e
          - C4d
          - C4e
        - C5 - Siberian, Mongolian, Han Chinese
          - C5a
            - C5a1
            - C5a2
              - C5a2a
              - C5a2b
                - C5a2b1
          - C5b
            - C5b1
              - C5b1a
                - C5b1a1
              - C5b1b
                - C5b1b1
          - C5c'd
            - C5c
              - C5c1
                - C5c1a
            - C5d
              - C5d1
              - C5d2
        - C7 - Han Chinese, Indo-China Peninsulan
          - C7a
            - C7a1
              - C7a1a
                - C7a1a1
                - C7a1a2
              - C7a1c
              - C7a1d
            - C7a2
              - C7a2a
          - C7b
      - Z
        - Z1'2'3'4'7
          - Z1 - Tofalar
            - Z1a - Tubalar
              - Z1a1
                - Z1a1a - Saami, Kets
                - Z1a1b - Nganasan, Estonian
              - Z1a2 - Ulch
                - Z1a2a - Nivkh
              - Z1a3 - Yakuts, Estonian
          - Z2 - Japanese
          - Z3 - Japanese
    - Z3a
      - Z3a1
        - Z3a1a - Han Chinese, Indian
      - Z3a2 - Indian
    - Z3b - Indian
      - Z3c - Persian(Iranian), Japanese
      - Z3d - Han Chinese, Taiwanese
          - Z4 - Han Chinese
            - Z4a - Japanese
              - Z4a1 - Han Chinese
                - Z4a1a
                  - Z4a1a1 - Japanese
          - Z7 - Indian
        - Z5 - Japanese

== Popular culture ==
The American figure skater Kristi Yamaguchi is a member of haplogroup M8a.

== See also ==
- Genealogical DNA test
- Genetic Genealogy
- Human mitochondrial genetics
- Population Genetics
- Human mitochondrial DNA haplogroups
- Indigenous American genetic studies

Phylogenetic tree of human mitochondrial DNA (mtDNA) haplogroups

Mitochondrial Eve (L)

L0
L1–6

L1
L2

L3

L4
L5
L6
M
N

CZ
D
E
G
Q

O
A
S
R

I
W
X
Y
C
Z
B
F
R0

pre-JT

P

U
HV
JT
K
H
V
J
T

== Bibliography ==
- Gómez-Carballa, Alberto; Catelli, Laura (November 12, 2015). "The complete mitogenome of a 500-year-old Inca child mummy". Scientific Reports. 5 16462. Bibcode:2015NatSR...516462G. doi:10.1038/srep16462. PMC 4642457. PMID 26561991.
- Jin, Han-Jun; Tyler-Smith, Chris; Kim, Wook (2009). Batzer, Mark A (ed.). "The Peopling of Korea Revealed by Analyses of Mitochondrial DNA and Y-Chromosomal Markers". PLOS ONE. 4 (1) e4210. Bibcode:2009PLoSO...4.4210J. doi:10.1371/journal.pone.0004210. PMC 2615218. PMID 19148289.
- Pakendorf, Brigitte; Novgorodov, Innokentij N.; Osakovskij, Vladimir L.; Danilova, Al'bina P.; Protod'jakonov, Artur P.; Stoneking, Mark (October 2006). "Investigating the effects of prehistoric migrations in Siberia: genetic variation and the origins of Yakuts". Human Genetics. 120 (3): 334–353. doi:10.1007/s00439-006-0213-2. PMID 16845541. S2CID 31651899.
- Atsushi Tajima; et al. (March 2, 2004). "Genetic origins of the Ainu inferred from combined DNA analyses of maternal and paternal lineages". Journal of Human Genetics. 49 (4): 187–193. doi:10.1007/s10038-004-0131-x. OCLC 110247689. PMID 14997363.
- Tanaka, Masashi; Cabrera, Vicente M.; González, Ana M.; Larruga, José M.; Takeyasu, Takeshi; Fuku, Noriyuki; Guo, Li-Jun; Hirose, Raita; Fujita, Yasunori; Kurata, Miyuki; Shinoda, Ken-ichi; Umetsu, Kazuo; Yamada, Yoshiji; Oshida, Yoshiharu; Sato, Yuzo; Hattori, Nobutaka; Mizuno, Yoshikuni; Arai, Yasumichi; Hirose, Nobuyoshi; Ohta, Shigeo; Ogawa, Osamu; Tanaka, Yasushi; Kawamori, Ryuzo; Shamoto-Nagai, Masayo; Maruyama, Wakako; Shimokata, Hiroshi; Suzuki, Ryota; Shimodaira, Hidetoshi (October 2004). "Mitochondrial Genome Variation in Eastern Asia and the Peopling of Japan". Genome Research. 14 (10a): 1832–1850. doi:10.1101/gr.2286304. PMC 524407. PMID 15466285.
- Trejaut, Jean A.; Kivisild, Toomas; Loo, Jun Hun; Lee, Chien Liang; He, Chun Lin; Hsu, Chia Jung; Lee, Zheng Yuan; Lin, Marie (2005). "Traces of Archaic Mitochondrial Lineages Persist in Austronesian-Speaking Formosan Populations". PLOS Biology. 3 (8). e247. doi:10.1371/journal.pbio.0030247. PMC 1166350. PMID 15984912.
- Umetsu, Kazuo; Tanaka, Masashi; Yuasa, Isao; et al. (2005). "Multiplex amplified product-length polymorphism analysis of 36 mitochondrial single-nucleotide polymorphisms for haplogrouping of East Asian populations". Electrophoresis. 26 (1): 91–98. doi:10.1002/elps.200406129. PMID 15624129. S2CID 44989190.
