= Haplogroup L =

Haplogroup L may refer to:

- Haplogroup L (Y-DNA), a human Y-chromosome (Y-DNA) haplogroup
- Macro-haplogroup L (mtDNA), a human mitochondrial DNA (mtDNA) macrohaplogroup that is at the root of the human mitochondrial phylogenetic tree. Its subclades are:
  - Haplogroup L0, a human mitochondrial DNA (mtDNA) haplogroup
  - Haplogroup L1 (mtDNA), a human mitochondrial DNA (mtDNA) haplogroup
  - Haplogroup L2 (mtDNA), a human mitochondrial DNA (mtDNA) haplogroup
  - Haplogroup L3 (mtDNA), a human mitochondrial DNA (mtDNA) haplogroup
  - Haplogroup L4 (mtDNA), a human mitochondrial DNA (mtDNA) haplogroup
  - Haplogroup L5 (mtDNA), a human mitochondrial DNA (mtDNA) haplogroup
  - Haplogroup L6 (mtDNA), a human mitochondrial DNA (mtDNA) haplogroup
  - Haplogroup L7, a human mitochondrial DNA (mtDNA) haplogroup; now Haplogroup L4a (mtDNA)
