= Haplogroup O =

Haplogroup O may refer to:

- Haplogroup O-M175, a human Y-chromosome (Y-DNA) haplogroup
- Haplogroup O (mtDNA), a human mitochondrial DNA (mtDNA) haplogroup
