= E haplogroup =

E haplogroup or Haplogroup E may refer to:

- Haplogroup E-M96 (Y-DNA)
- Haplogroup E (mtDNA)
