= Haplogroup Q (mtDNA) =

Human mitochondrial DNA haplogroup

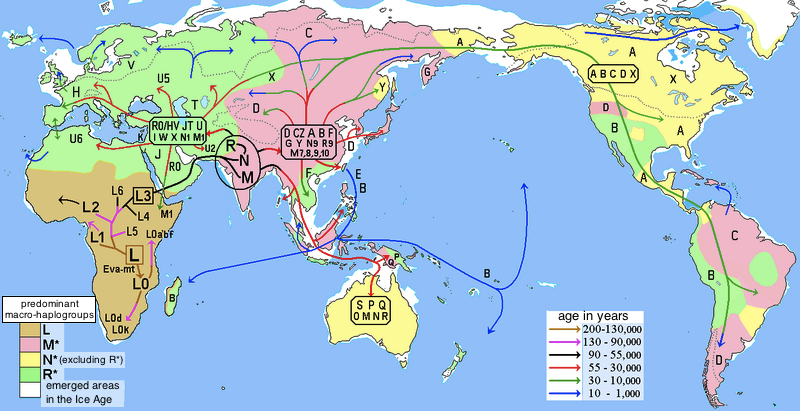
- Possible time of origin: ~50,000 bp
- Possible place of origin: Possibly Oceania
- Ancestor: M29'Q
- Descendants: Q1'2, Q3
- Defining mutations: 4117 5843 8790 12940 16129 16241

In human mitochondrial genetics, haplogroup Q is a human mitochondrial DNA (mtDNA) haplogroup typical for Oceania. It is a subgroup of haplogroup M29'Q.

== Origin ==
Haplogroup Q is a descendant of haplogroup M.

== Distribution ==
Today, mitochondrial DNA Haplogroup Q is found in the southern Pacific region, especially in New Guinea, Melanesia and indigenous Australians. Haplogroup Q is very diverse and frequently occurring among Papuan and Melanesian populations, with an inferred coalescence time of approximately 50,000 years before present. The frequency of this haplogroup among the populations of the islands of Wallacea in eastern Indonesia is quite high, indicating some genetic affinity between the populations of these islands and the indigenous peoples of New Guinea. Haplogroup Q has also been found at higher frequencies, among modern populations of Sundaland but in moderate frequencies Micronesia, and Polynesia. In Southeast Asia it is found in lower frequencies. Malaysians 1.8%, It's also found in Indonesians, Filipinos (especially in Surigaonon people it's 4.17%), Balinese 1.2%, Borneans 1.3%.

== Subclades ==
=== Tree ===
This phylogenetic tree of haplogroup Q subclades is based on the paper by Mannis van Oven and Manfred Kayser Updated comprehensive phylogenetic tree of global human mitochondrial DNA variation and subsequent published research.

- Q
  - Q1'2
    - Q1
      - Q1-T16223C
        - Q1a
          - Q1a1
            - Q1a1a
        - Q1b
        - Q1c
          - Q1c1
            - Q1c1a
          - Q1c2
            - Q1c2a
      - Q1d
      - Q1e
        - Q1e1
          - Q1e1a
            - Q1e1a1
          - Q1e1b
            - Q1e1b1
          - Q1e1c
      - Q1f
        - Q1f1
        - Q1f2
    - Q2
      - Q2a
        - Q2a1
        - Q2a2
          - Q2a2a
          - Q2a2b
        - Q2a3
          - Q2a3a
          - Q2a3b
        - Q2a4
      - Q2b
  - Q3
    - Q3a
      - Q3a-C61T
        - Q3a1
    - Q3b

== See also ==
- Genealogical DNA test
- Genetic genealogy
- Human mitochondrial genetics
- Population genetics
- Human mitochondrial DNA haplogroups

Phylogenetic tree of human mitochondrial DNA (mtDNA) haplogroups

Mitochondrial Eve (L)

L0
L1–6

L1
L2

L3

L4
L5
L6
M
N

CZ
D
E
G
Q

O
A
S
R

I
W
X
Y
C
Z
B
F
R0

pre-JT

P

U
HV
JT
K
H
V
J
T
