= Haplogroup V (mtDNA) =

Human mitochondrial DNA (mtDNA) haplogroup

- Possible time of origin: Over 14,000 years BP
- Possible place of origin: Europe (southwestern)
- Ancestor: HV0a
- Descendants: V1, V2, V3, V4, V5, V6, V7, V8, V9, V10, V11, V12, V14, V15, V16, V17, V18, V22, V23, V24, V25, V26, V27, V28, V36
- Defining mutations: 4580

Haplogroup V is a human mitochondrial DNA (mtDNA) haplogroup. The clade is believed to have originated over 14,000 years ago in Southwestern Europe.

== Origin ==
Haplogroup V derives from the HV0a subclade of haplogroup HV. In 1998 it was argued that V spread over Europe from an Ice Age refuge in Iberia. However more recent estimates of the date of V would place it in the Neolithic.

== Distribution ==
Haplogroup V is a relatively rare mtDNA haplogroup, occurring in around 4% of native Europeans. Its highest concentration is among the Saami people of northern Fennoscandia (~59%). It has been found at a frequency of approximately 10% among the Maris of the Volga-Ural region, leading to the suggestion that this region might be the source of the V among the Saami. Haplogroup V has been observed at higher than average levels among Cantabrian people (15%) of northern Iberia, and among the adjacent Basque (10.4%).

Haplogroup V is also found in parts of Northwest Africa. It is mainly concentrated among the Tuareg inhabiting the Gorom-Gorom area in Burkina Faso (21%), Sahrawi in the Western Sahara (17.9%), and Berbers of Matmata, Tunisia (16.3%). The rare V7a subclade occurs among Algerians in Oran (1.08%) and Reguibate Sahrawi (1.85%).

== Ancient DNA ==
MtDNA haplogroup V has been reported in Neolithic remains of the Linear Pottery culture at Halberstadt, Germany c. 5000 BC and Derenburg Meerenstieg, Germany c. 4910 BC. Haplogroup V7 was found in representative Maykop culture samples in the excavations conducted by Alexei Rezepkin. Haplogroup V has been detected in representatives Trypil'ska and Unetice culture.

Haplogroup V has also been found among Iberomaurusian specimens dating from the Epipaleolithic at the Taforalt prehistoric site 14,000 years BP.

Haplogroup V has also been found among Somogyvár-Vinkovci culture specimens from western Hungary dating to the Bronze Age. There are also examples of rare V36 (considered Scandic, perhaps Saami related) in neighbouring Serbia and Croatia.

=== Tree ===
This phylogenetic tree of haplogroup V subclades is based on the paper by Mannis van Oven and Manfred Kayser Updated comprehensive phylogenetic tree of global human mitochondrial DNA variation and subsequent published research.

- V
  - V1
    - V1a found mostly from central to northeast Europe
      - V1a1 found in Scandinavia (including Lapland), Finland and Baltic countries
        - V1a1a
          - V1a1a1
        - V1a1b
      - V1a2 found in Bronze Age Poland
    - V1b found in Germany, Poland
  - V2 found in the British Isles
    - V2a found in Ireland
      - V2a1
        - V2a1a found in Finns
    - V2b found in England, Germany, Denmark, Poland, Spain
      - V2b1
      - V2b2
    - V2c found in Norway, Denmark, England, Ireland, Switzerland
  - V3 found in northwest Europe / found in Late Neolithic Hungary (Bell Beaker)
    - V3a
      - V3a1
    - V3b
    - V3c found in Northern, Central and Eastern Europe
  - V4 found in France
  - V5 found in Lapland
  - V6 found in northwest Europe
  - V7
    - V7a found mostly in Slavic countries, but also in Scandinavia, Germany and France
      - V7a1
    - V7b found in eastern Europe and France
  - V8 found in North Europe
  - V9
    - V9a found in the British Isles
      - V9a1
      - V9a2 found in Ireland, England, Scotland (Shetland), Denmark
  - V10 found in the British Isles, northwest France and Sweden / found in Bell Beaker Scotland
    - V10a found in Sweden, Ireland, Spain
    - V10b found in EBA England
      - V10b1
      - V10b2
  - V11 found in Italy (Calabria)
  - V12 found in Germany
  - V13 found in Poland and Russia
  - V14 found in Poland and Iberia
  - V15 found in England, Norway and Armenia
    - V15a
  - V16 found in Britain, Germany and Denmark
  - V17 found in England / found in Late Neolithic France
  - V18 found in the Netherlands, Germany and Italy
    - V18a found in Slavic countries, Sweden, Denmark, Spain, and the Netherlands
  - V-C150T
    - V19 found in the United Kingdom (including Northern Ireland), Ireland
    - V22 found in Spain (including Basques) and France (Basques)
  - V-C16298T!
    - V20 found in Norway
  - V-C72T!
    - V21
  - V23
  - V24 found in Norway
  - V25 found in South Europe, Berbers of Algeria and Morocco
  - V26 found in Denmark and Germany
  - V27 found in Denmark
  - V28 found in Denmark
  - V29 found in Spain and Poland
  - V30 found in Poland
  - V31 found in Italy, including Sardinia
  - V32 found in Germany and Norway
  - V33 found in Ireland and Denmark
  - V34
  - V35
  - V36 found in Sweden, but also in Serbia and Croatia (perhaps related to that ancient DNA find in what is now Hungary)
  - V37
  - V38
  - V39
  - V40
  - V41
  - V42
  - V43
  - V44
  - V45
  - V46
  - V47
  - V48
  - V49
  - V50
  - V51
  - V52
  - V53
  - V54
  - V55
  - V56
  - V57
  - V58
  - V59
  - V60
  - V61
  - V62
  - V63
  - V64
  - V65
  - V66
  - V67
  - V68
  - V69
  - V70
  - V71
  - V72
  - V73
  - V74
  - V75
  - V76
  - V77
  - V78

== Popular culture ==
- Benjamin Franklin was a member of haplogroup V
- Singer-songwriter Bono is a member of haplogroup V

== See also ==
- Velda
- Genealogical DNA test
- Genetic genealogy
- Human mitochondrial genetics
- Population genetics
- Human mitochondrial DNA haplogroups

Phylogenetic tree of human mitochondrial DNA (mtDNA) haplogroups

Mitochondrial Eve (L)

L0
L1–6

L1
L2

L3

L4
L5
L6
M
N

CZ
D
E
G
Q

O
A
S
R

I
W
X
Y
C
Z
B
F
R0

pre-JT

P

U
HV
JT
K
H
V
J
T
