= Haplogroup Z =

Human mitochondrial DNA haplogroup

- Possible time of origin: 21,661.6 [95% CI 13,280.8 <-> 30,042.4] ybp 24,900 [95% CI 15,900 <-> 34,400] ybp 25,300 (95% CI 20,300 <-> 31,200) ybp
- Possible place of origin: Central Asia
- Ancestor: CZ
- Defining mutations: 152 6752 9090 15784 16185 16260

In human mitochondrial genetics, Haplogroup Z is a human mitochondrial DNA (mtDNA) haplogroup.

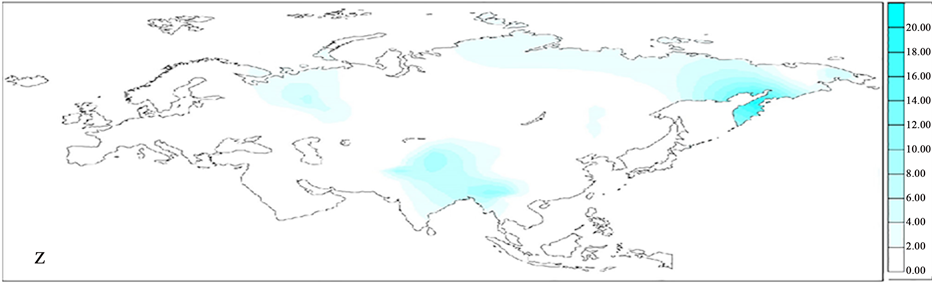
Frequency distribution of mtDNA haplogroup Z in Eurasia

== Origin ==
Haplogroup Z is believed to have arisen in Central Asia, and is a descendant of haplogroup CZ.

== Distribution ==
The greatest clade diversity of haplogroup Z is found in East Asia and Central Asia. However, its greatest frequency appears in some peoples of Russia, such as Evens from Kamchatka (8/39 Z1a2a, 3/39 Z1a3, 11/39 = 28.2% Z total) and from Berezovka, Srednekolymsky District, Sakha Republic (3/15 Z1a3, 1/15 Z1a2a, 4/15 = 26.7% Z total), and among the Saami people of northern Fennoscandia. With the exception of three Khakasses who belong to Z4, two Yakut who belong to Z3a1, two Yakut, a Yakutian Evenk, a Buryat, and an Altai Kizhi who belong to Z3(xZ3a, Z3c), and the presence of the Z3c clade among populations of Altai Republic, nearly all members of haplogroup Z in North Asia and Europe belong to subclades of Z1. The TMRCA of Z1 is 20,400 [95% CI 7,400 <-> 34,000] ybp according to Sukernik et al. 2012, 20,400 [95% CI 7,800 <-> 33,800] ybp according to Fedorova et al. 2013, or 19,600 [95% CI 12,500 <-> 29,300] ybp according to YFull. Among the members (Z1, Z2, Z3, Z4, and Z7) of haplogroup Z, Nepalese populations were characterized by rare clades Z3a1a and Z7, of which Z3a1a was the most frequent sub-clade in Newar, with a frequency of 16.5%. Z3, found in East Asia, North Asia, and MSEA, is the oldest member of haplogroup Z with an estimated age of ~ 25.4 Kya. Haplogroup Z3a1a is also detected in other Nepalese populations, such as Magar (5.4%), Tharu, Kathmandu (mixed population) and Nepali-other (mixed population from Kathmandu and Eastern Nepal). S6). Z3a1a1 detected in Tibet, Myanmar, Nepal, India, Thai-Laos and Vietnam trace their ancestral roots to China with a coalescent age of ~ 8.4 Kya

Fedorova et al. 2013 have reported finding Z* (xZ1a, Z3, Z4) in 1/388 Turks and 1/491 Kazakhs. These individuals should belong to Z1* (elsewhere observed in a Tofalar), Z2 (observed in Japanese), Z7 (observed in the Himalaya), Z5 (observed in Japanese), or basal Z* (observed in a Blang individual in Northern Thailand).

== Subclades ==
=== Tree ===
This phylogenetic tree of haplogroup Z subclades is based on the paper by Mannis van Oven and Manfred Kayser Updated comprehensive phylogenetic tree of global human mitochondrial DNA variation and subsequent published research.

- Z
  - Z* – Thailand (Blang in Chiang Rai Province)
  - Z-T152C! (TMRCA 24,300 [95% CI 19,300 <-> 30,300] ybp)
    - Z-T152C!* – Hong Kong
    - Z1 (TMRCA 18,600 [95% CI 10,900 <-> 29,500] ybp)
      - Z1a – Koryak, Buryat, Kalmyk, Mongol (Hinggan, Hulunbuir, Xilingol), Khakas, Shor, Altai Kizhi, Kazakh, Kyrgyz, Uyghur, Turk, Arab (Uzbekistan) (TMRCA 7,600 [95% CI 5,100 <-> 10,900] ybp)
        - Z1a1 (Z1a+A9494G) – Italy, Hungary (ancient Avar), Germany, Sweden, Kazakh, Uyghur, Buryat (TMRCA 5,600 [95% CI 2,500 <-> 10,900] ybp)
          - Z1a1+A12930G
            - Z1a1a (Z1a1+A12930G+G740A) – Khakas, Nogai, Udmurt, Russia (Krasnodar Krai, etc.), Abazin, Cherkessian, Finland, Norway, Sweden, Estonia, Ukrainian
              - Z1a1a* – Norway (Vest-Agder, Aust-Agder), Finland, Sami (Västerbotten, Norrbotten), Komi, Russia (Chelyabinsk Oblast), Ket (lower Yenisey River basin)
              - Z1a1a1 – Russia (Chelyabinsk Oblast)
              - Z1a1a2 – Udmurt
              - Z1a1a3 – Russia (Chelyabinsk Oblast, Novgorod Oblast), Poland
              - Z1a1a4 – Finland (Eastern Finland Province), Estonia (Rapla County)
          - Z1a1c (Z1a1+C16294T) - Sweden, Germany
          - Z1a1+G7521A!
            - Z1a1b (Z1a1+G7521A!+G8251A) - Nganasan (Taimyr Peninsula), Yukaghir (lower Indigirka River basin), Even (Sakkyryyr, Eveno-Bytantaysky National district or Momsky district of Sakha Republic), Evenk (Iengra River basin, Nyukzha river basin), Dolgan
            - Z1a1d (Z1a1+G7521A!+T14512C) - Buryat (Irkutsk Region)
              - Z1a1d1 (Z1a1d+A4136G) - China (Uyghur)
        - Z1a2 (TMRCA 5,400 [95% CI 2,400 <-> 10,400] ybp)
          - Z1a2* – Ulchi (lower Amur River basin)
          - Z1a2a – Itelmen, Koryak
            - Z1a2a* – Even (Kamchatka), Yukaghir (upper Anadyr River basin)
            - Z1a2a1
              - Z1a2a1* – Even (Kamchatka, Berezovka)
              - Z1a2a1a – Even (Kamchatka), Evenk (village of Nelkan by the Maya River in the Okhotsk Region)
        - Z1a3 (TMRCA 3,600 [95% CI 1,850 <-> 6,500] ybp)
          - Z1a3* – Yukaghir (upper Anadyr River basin), Even (Tompo District, Eveno-Bytantaysky National district or Momsky district of Sakha Republic), Evenk (Nyukzha River basin), Yakut (central Yakutia)
          - Z1a3a
            - Z1a3a* – Even (Kamchatka)
            - Z1a3a1 – Yukaghir (lower Kolyma River basin), Even (Berezovka)
          - Z1a3b – Even (Berezovka), Yakut
        - Z1a4 (TMRCA 5,500 [95% CI 3,200 <-> 9,000] ybp)
          - Z1a4* – Uyghur, Tubalar, Buryat (Irkutsk Oblast)
          - Z1a4a – Uyghur
      - Z1b – Tofalar
        - Z1b1 (G251A) - Tofalar (Karagas) from Alygdzher, Barghut
    - Z2 – Japan (Tokyo, Aichi, Chūbu-Hokuriku, Tōhoku, etc.) (TMRCA 3,900 [95% CI 1,450 <-> 8,400] ybp)
    - Z3 – China (Shanghai, Dengba, Xinjiang Uyghur, etc.), Singapore, Malaysia, Thailand (Lao Isan in Chaiyaphum Province), Vietnam, Uyghur, Evenk (Sakha Republic), Mongol (Hohhot, Tongliao, Chaoyang, Chifeng, Jiangsu), Buryat, Kalmyk, Altai Kizhi, Kyrgyz, Kazakh, Tajik, Azerbaijan, North Ossetian, Romania, USA (TMRCA 15,836 [SD 4,397] ybp)
      - Z3a – China (Mongol, Xibo, Deng, etc.), Kazakh (TMRCA 12,900 [95% CI 9,000 <-> 18,000] ybp)
        - Z3a1
          - Z3a1a
            - Z3a1a - Nepal (Newar, Magar, Tharu, Eastern Nepal, Kathmandu)
            - Z3a1a* – Lachungpa, Lepcha
            - Z3a1a1 – China
            - Z3a1a2 – Gallong, Dirang Monpa, Thailand (Khon Mueang in Mae Hong Son Province), Vietnam (Hà Nhì)
          - Z3a1b – Yakut
        - Z3a2 – Lachungpa
          - Z3a2a – Lachungpa
        - Z3a3 – Thailand (Palaung in Chiang Mai Province, Lawa in Mae Hong Son Province)
      - Z3b – Deng, Gallong (TMRCA 8,400 [95% CI 2,300 <-> 21,500] ybp)
      - Z3-G709A – Yakut, China (Han from Henan)
        - Z3c – Altaian, Altai Kizhi, Iran, China (Kyrgyz from Tashkurgan, Mongol from Tongliao, etc.), Cambodia (Siem Reap), Vietnam, Japan
        - Z3d – China (Han, Daur, Mongol from Hulunbuir, etc.), Taiwan (Minnan, etc.), Singapore, Korea, Japan (Chūbu-Hokuriku, Tōhoku), Mongolia, Kyrgyzstan
      - Z3+G11696A – China, Korea
        - Z3+G11696A+C16380T - China
        - Z3+G11696A+T454C - China
      - Z3+T8227C – China
        - Z3+T8227C+A13629G - China
        - Z3+T8227C+T4363C - Korea
          - Z3+T8227C+T4363C+A12996G - China (HGDP She people)
            - Z3+T8227C+T4363C+A12996G+T773C - Pakistan (HGDP Hazara)
      - Z3g (Z3+G7337A) - Japan, Kazakhstan (Jetisuu)
      - Z3+A13105G! - China (Barghut from Inner Mongolia)
        - Z3+A13105G!+A13434G - China (Han from Henan, etc.)
    - Z4 – China (Suzhou, Mongol in Shandong, etc.), Thailand (Phuan in Suphan Buri Province), Philippines, Uzbekistan, Kazakhstan, Kalmyk, Khakas, Karanogai (TMRCA 14,900 [95% CI 9,200 <-> 22,800] ybp)
      - Z4a – China (Han from Hunan and Denver, Mongol from Inner Mongolia, Liaoning, Heilongjiang, Hebei, Henan, Shandong, etc.), Uyghur, Daur, Japan (Tokyo)
        - Z4a1 – China (Han from Wuhan, Mongol from Baotou and Xilingol)
          - Z4a1a – China (Han from Hunan and Yunnan), Vietnam
            - Z4a1a1 – Japan (Tokyo, etc.), South Korea
    - Z7 – Dirang Monpa, Tibet (Tingri, Shannan) (TMRCA 1,750 [95% CI 275 <-> 6,200] ybp), Nepal (Newar)
    - Z8* – Nepal (Newar)
  - Z5 – Japan (Aichi)

== See also ==
- Genealogical DNA test
- Genetic genealogy
- Human mitochondrial genetics
- Population genetics
- Human mitochondrial DNA haplogroups

Phylogenetic tree of human mitochondrial DNA (mtDNA) haplogroups

Mitochondrial Eve (L)

L0
L1–6

L1
L2

L3

L4
L5
L6
M
N

CZ
D
E
G
Q

O
A
S
R

I
W
X
Y
C
Z
B
F
R0

pre-JT

P

U
HV
JT
K
H
V
J
T
