= Haplogroup JT =

Human mitochondrial DNA

- Possible time of origin: 50,300 YBP
- Possible place of origin: West Asia
- Ancestor: R2'JT
- Descendants: J, T
- Defining mutations: 11251, 15452A, 16126

Haplogroup JT is a human mitochondrial DNA (mtDNA) haplogroup.

== Origin ==
Haplogroup JT is descended from the macro-haplogroup R. It is the ancestral clade to the mitochondrial haplogroups J and T.

== Distribution ==
JT (predominantly J) was found among the ancient Etruscans. The root level haplogroup JT* has been assigned to an ancient person found at the Colfiorito necropolis in Umbria in central Italy.

The haplogroup has also been found among Iberomaurusian specimens dating from the Epipaleolithic at the Taforalt prehistoric site. One ancient individual carried a haplotype, which correlates with either the JT clade or the haplogroup H subclade H14b1 (1/9; 11%).

== Subclades ==
=== Tree ===
This phylogenetic tree of haplogroup JT subclades is based on the paper by Mannis van Oven and Manfred Kayser Updated comprehensive phylogenetic tree of global human mitochondrial DNA variation and subsequent published research.

- R2'JT
  - JT
    - J
    - T

=== Health ===
Maternally inherited ancient mtDNA variants have clear impact on the presentation of disease in a modern society. Superhaplogroup JT is an example of reduced risk of Parkinson's disease And mitochondrial and mtDNa alterations continue to be promising disease biomarkers.

== See also ==
- Genealogical DNA test
- Genetic genealogy
- Human mitochondrial genetics
- Population genetics

Phylogenetic tree of human mitochondrial DNA (mtDNA) haplogroups

Mitochondrial Eve (L)

L0
L1–6

L1
L2

L3

L4
L5
L6
M
N

CZ
D
E
G
Q

O
A
S
R

I
W
X
Y
C
Z
B
F
R0

pre-JT

P

U
HV
JT
K
H
V
J
T
