= Haplogroup P (mtDNA) =

Human mitochondrial DNA haplogroup

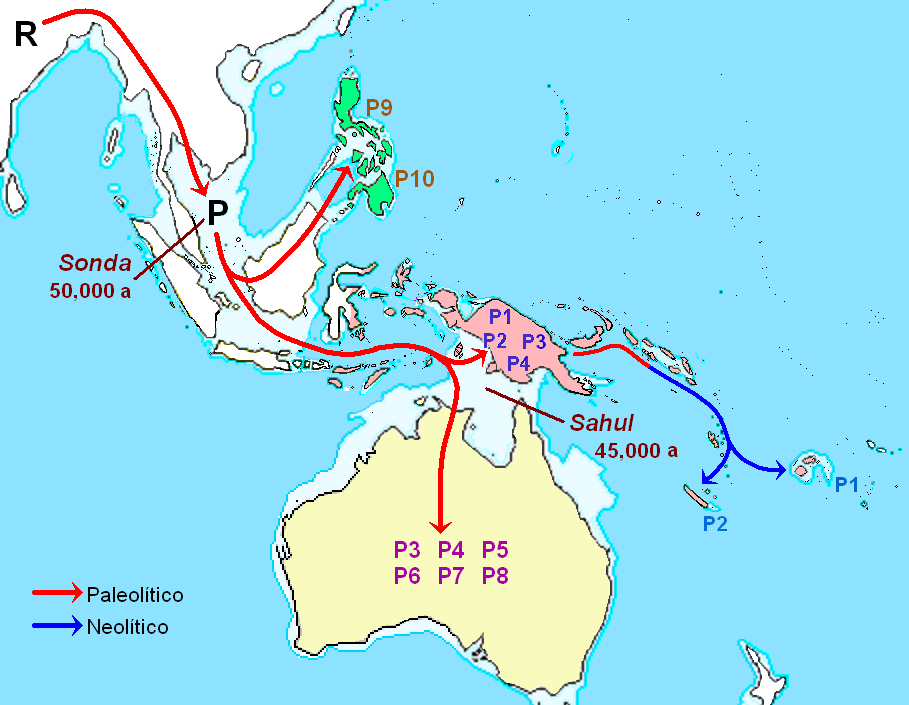
- Possible time of origin: 50,000 years
- Possible place of origin: Southeast Asia
- Ancestor: R
- Descendants: 16176, P3, P4, P5, P6, P7, P9
- Defining mutations: 15607

In human mitochondrial genetics, Haplogroup P is a human mitochondrial DNA (mtDNA) haplogroup.

== Origin ==
Haplogroup P is a descendant of Haplogroup R.

== Distribution ==
Today, P is most commonly found in Oceania, especially in Papuans, Melanesians, indigenous Australians, It's 1.4% in mainstream Filipinos but 1.13% in Luzon, 1.78% in Visayas, 1.43% in Mindanao. It is much higher in Sub-Filipinos groups, 6.67% in Bugkalot and 11.2% in Maranao. It was found in the Philippines Negrito Aeta of Bataan at 40%. It is also found in the Malaysians at 0.9%, including Indonesians.

== Subclades ==
=== Tree ===
This phylogenetic tree of haplogroup P subclades is based on the paper by Mannis van Oven and Manfred Kayser Updated comprehensive phylogenetic tree of global human mitochondrial DNA variation and subsequent published research.

- P
  - P-C16176T
    - P1
      - P1d
        - P1d1
          - P1d1a
        - P1d2
          - P1d2a
      - P1-T152C!
        - P1f
    - P2'10
      - P2
      - P10
    - P8
  - P3
    - P3a
    - P3b
      - P3b1
  - P4
    - P4a
      - P4a1
    - P4b
      - P4b1
  - P5
  - P6
  - P7
  - P9
    - P9a

== See also ==
- Genealogical DNA test
- Genetic genealogy
- Human mitochondrial genetics
- Population genetics

Phylogenetic tree of human mitochondrial DNA (mtDNA) haplogroups

Mitochondrial Eve (L)

L0
L1–6

L1
L2

L3

L4
L5
L6
M
N

CZ
D
E
G
Q

O
A
S
R

I
W
X
Y
C
Z
B
F
R0

pre-JT

P

U
HV
JT
K
H
V
J
T
