= Haplogroup R0 =

Human mitochondrial DNA haplogroup

- Possible time of origin: 23,600 to 54,900 YBP
- Possible place of origin: Arabian Peninsula
- Ancestor: R
- Descendants: R0a, HV
- Defining mutations: 73, 11719

Haplogroup R0 (formerly known as haplogroup pre-HV) is a human mitochondrial DNA (mtDNA) haplogroup.

== Origin ==
Haplogroup R0 derives from the macro-haplogroup R. It is an ancestral clade to the R0a subclade and haplogroup HV, and is therefore antecedent to the haplogroups H and V.

R0's greater subclade variety in the Arabian Peninsula suggests that the clade originated in and spread from there.

R0a is believed to have evolved in Ice Age oases in South Arabia around 22,000 years ago. The subclade would then have spread from there with the onset of the Late Glacial period circa 15,000 ybp.

== Distribution ==
Haplogroup R0 has been found in around 55% of osteological remains belonging to the Eneolithic Trypillia culture.

The R0 clade has also been found among Iberomaurusian specimens at the Taforalt and Afalou prehistoric sites, which date from the Epipaleolithic. Among the Taforalt individuals, around 17% of the observed haplotypes belonged to various R0 subclades, including R0a1a (3/24; 13%) and R0a2c (1/24; 4%). Among the Afalou individuals, one R0a1a haplotype was detected (1/9; 11%).

R0 has likewise been observed among mummies excavated at the Abusir el-Meleq archaeological site in Middle Egypt, which date from the Pre-Ptolemaic/late New Kingdom, Ptolemaic, and Roman periods.

The 3rd century AD Catholic Church Saint, Fortunato of Serracapriola, was also found to carry the R0a'b subclade.

R0 today occurs commonly in the Arabian peninsula, with its highest frequency observed nearby among the Soqotri (40.7%). The Soqotri also have the greatest R0 subclade diversity. The clade is likewise found at high frequencies among the Kalash in South Asia (23%). Additionally, moderate frequencies of R0 occur in Northeast Africa, Anatolia, the Iranian Plateau and Dalmatia. The haplogroup has been observed among Chad Arabs (19%), Sudanese Copts (13.8%), Tigrais (13.6%), Somalis (13.3%), Oromos (13.3%), Afar (12.5%), Amhara (11.5%), Gurage (10%), Reguibate Sahrawi (9.26%; 0.93% R0a and 8.33% R0a1a), Gaalien (9%), Beja (8.3%), Nubians (8%), Arakien (5.9%), Yemenis (5.1–27.7%), Iraqis (4.8%), Druze (4.3%), Palestinians (4%), Algerians (1.67%), and Saudis (0–25%).

== Subclades ==
=== Tree ===
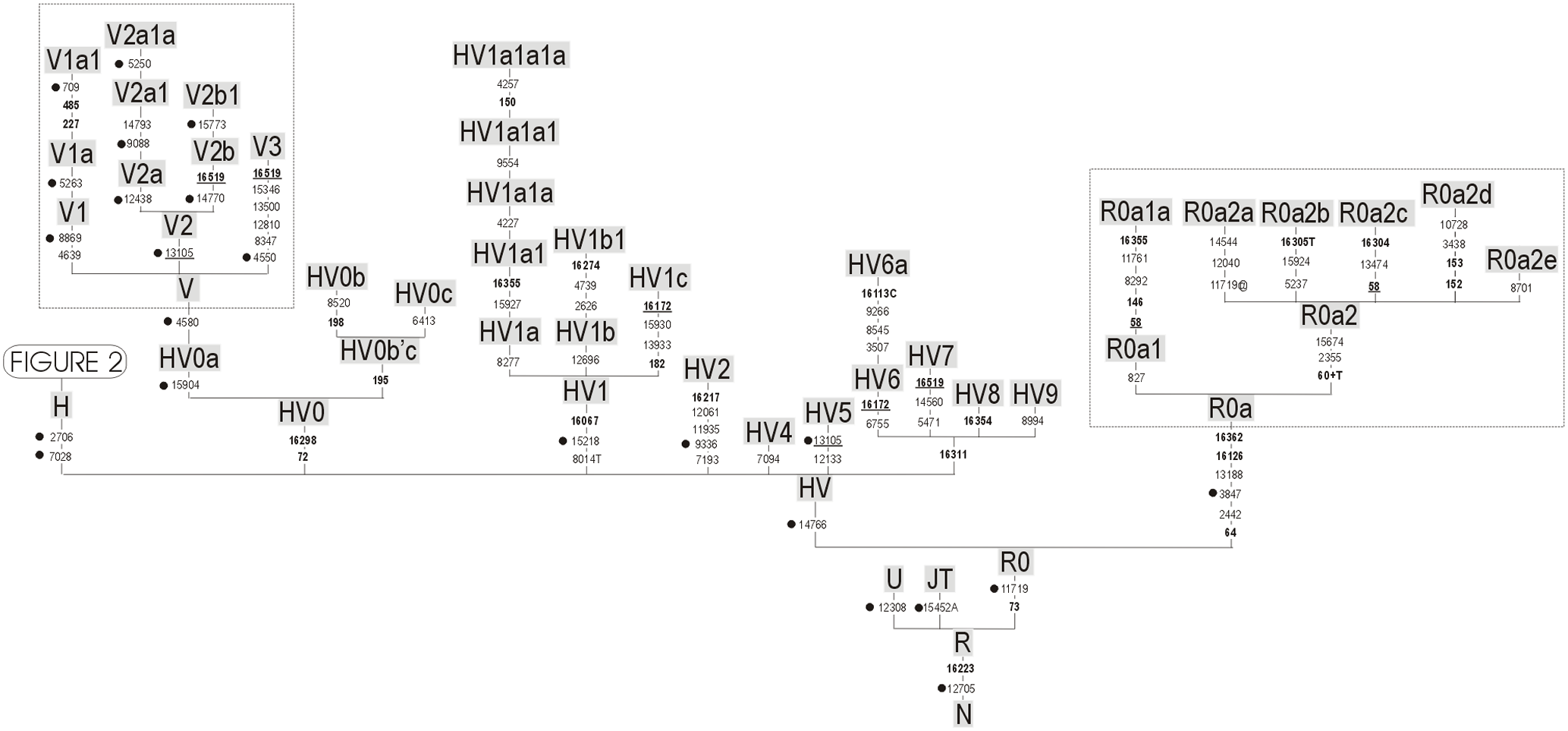
Phylogenetic tree of haplogroup R0 subclades

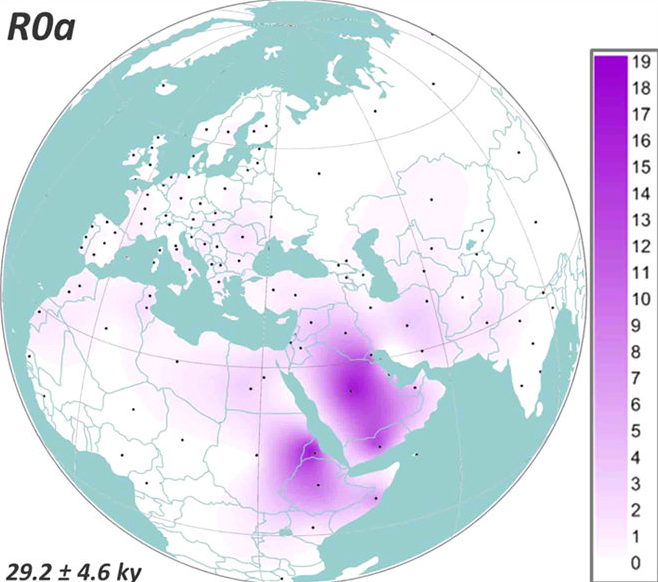
Projected spatial frequency distribution of haplogroup R0a. Most common in the Arabian Peninsula, with a peak in nearby Socotra (~40%; see observed frequencies above)

This phylogenetic tree of haplogroup R0 subclades is based on the paper by Mannis van Oven and Manfred Kayser Updated comprehensive phylogenetic tree of global human mitochondrial DNA variation and subsequent published research.

- R
  - R0 (or pre-HV)
    - R0a'b – Albania
      - R0a (or (pre-HV)1)
        - R0a1 or (pre-HV)1a
          - R0a1a – Saudi Arabia, Yemen, Qatar, Bahrain, Kuwait, Lebanon, Italy
            - R0a1a1 – Yemen, Tunisia
              - R0a1a1a – Yemen (Socotra)
            - R0a1a2 – Ethiopia
            - R0a1a3
            - R0a1a4 – Saudi Arabia, Qatar, Kuwait, Iraq
          - R0a1-T152C! – Morocco, Spain
            - R0a1b – Arabia
        - R0a-60.1T – Italy, Armenians of Turkey, Kalash of Pakistan
          - R0a2'3 – Iran, Lebanon
            - R0a2 or (pre-HV)1b
              - R0a2a – Portugal, Spain, Italy
                - R0a2a1 – Italy, Algeria
              - R0a2b – Ethiopia
              - R0a2c – Saudi Arabia, Qatar, Kuwait, Yemenite Jews
              - R0a2d – Yemen, Iran, Italy, Pashtuns from Pakistan, Afghanistan
              - R0a2e
              - R0a2f – Arabs from Chad, United Arab Emirates, Saudi Arabia
                - R0a2f1
                  - R0a2f1a – Oman, Saudi Arabia, Yemen
                  - R0a2f1b – Yemen, United Arab Emirates
              - R0a2g
                - R0a2g1
                  - R0a2g1a
                  - R0a2g1a1 – Saho of Eritrea, Amhara of Ethiopia
              - R0a2h – United Arab Emirates
                - R0a2h1 – Afar of Eritrea
              - R0a2i – Yemen
              - R0a2-T195C! – Saudi Arabia
                - R0a2j – Yemen, Oman, United Arab Emirates
              - R0a2k – Sardinia
                - R0a2k1 – Saudi Arabia, Yemen
              - R0a2l – Yemen
              - R0a2m – Ashkenazi Jews, Xueta of Spain, Gitanos of Spain, Mexico, Ecuador, Morocco
              - R0a2n – Druze of Lebanon, Assyrians, Italy, Balti of Pakistan
              - R0a2q – Oromo of Kenya, Saho of Eritrea
              - R0a2r – Southern Europe (Romania, Bulgaria), Druze
            - R0a3 – Yemen, Persians
              - R0a3a – Lebanon, Yemen
          - R0a4 – Spain, Portugal, Ashkenazi Jews, Iraq
      - R0b – Italy, Azerbaijan
    - HV
      - HV0
        - HV0a
          - V
      - H

== See also ==
- Genealogical DNA test
- Genetic genealogy
- Human mitochondrial genetics
- Population genetics

Phylogenetic tree of human mitochondrial DNA (mtDNA) haplogroups

Mitochondrial Eve (L)

L0
L1–6

L1
L2

L3

L4
L5
L6
M
N

CZ
D
E
G
Q

O
A
S
R

I
W
X
Y
C
Z
B
F
R0

pre-JT

P

U
HV
JT
K
H
V
J
T
