= Haplogroup S (mtDNA) =

Human mitochondrial DNA grouping found in Australia

- Possible time of origin: 64,000-47,000 years ago
- Possible place of origin: Australia
- Ancestor: N
- Descendants: S1, S2, S3, S4, S5, S6
- Defining mutations: 8404

In human genetics, Haplogroup S is a human mitochondrial DNA (mtDNA) haplogroup found only among Indigenous Australians. It is a descendant of macrohaplogroup N.

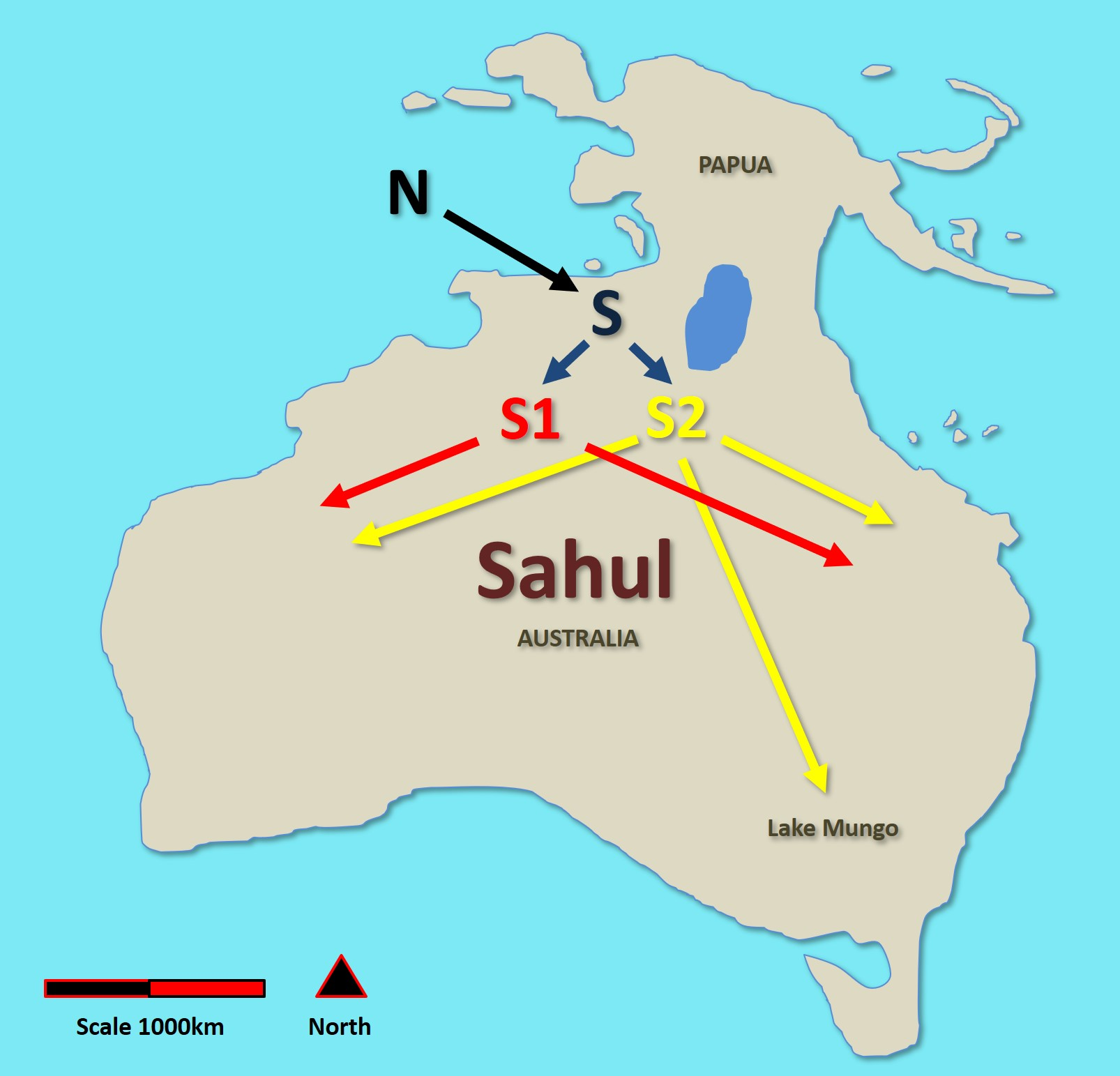
Map of Haplogroup S mtDNA

== Origin ==
Haplogroup S mtDNA evolved within Australia between 64,000 and 40,000 years ago (51 kya).

== Distribution ==
It is found in the Indigenous Australian population. Haplogroup S2 found in Willandra Lakes human remain WLH4 dated back Late Holocene (3,000–500 years ago).

The following table lists relevant GenBank samples:

| Haplogroup | GenBank ID | Sample's Era | Region |
|---|---|---|---|
| S* | KY595638 | Modern | New South Wales |
| S1 | KY595550 | Modern | Queensland |
| S1a | DQ404440 | Modern | New South Wales |
| S1a | DQ404441 | Modern | Northern Territory |
| S1a1 | KY595591 | Modern | Queensland |
| S1a1a | JN226144 | Modern | Western Australia |
| S1a1a | KY595596 | Modern | Queensland |
| S1a1a | KY595610 | Modern | Queensland |
| S1a1b | KY595597 | Modern | Queensland |
| S1a1b | KY595623 | Modern | Queensland |
| S1b1 | AF346963 | Modern | Northern Territory |
| S1b1 | KY595632 | Modern | Queensland |
| S1b1a | KY595615 | Modern | Queensland |
| S1b1a1 | KY595551 | Modern | Queensland |
| S1b1a1 | KY595559 | Modern | Queensland |
| S1b2 | KY595560 | Modern | Queensland |
| S1b2 | KY595566 | Modern | Queensland |
| S1b2a | KY595620 | Modern | New South Wales |
| S1b3 | KY595579 | Modern | Queensland |
| S1b3a | KY595546 | Modern | Queensland |
| S1b3a | KY595562 | Modern | Queensland |
| S1b3a1 | KY595547 | Modern | Queensland |
| S1b3a1 | KY595548 | Modern | Queensland |
| S2a | AY289051 | Modern | Northern Territory |
| S2a | AY289061 | Modern | Northern Territory |
| S2a | KY595586 | Modern | Queensland |
| S2a | KY595604 | Modern | Victoria |
| S2b | KY595670 | Modern | Tasmania |
| S2b1a | KY595567 | Modern | New South Wales |
| S2b1a1 | MK165667 | Ancient | Barham, New South Wales |
| S2b1a1 | MK165668 | Ancient | Barham, New South Wales |
| S2b1b | KY595616 | Modern | Queensland |
| S2b1b | KY595664 | Modern | Queensland |
| S2b1c | KU659023 | Ancient | Willandra Lakes Region, New South Wales |
| S2b1c1 | KY595602 | Modern | New South Wales |
| S2b1c1 | KY595603 | Modern | New South Wales |
| S2c | JN226145 | Modern | Western Australia |
| S2c1 | AY289060 | Modern | Northern Territory |
| S2c1 | KY595624 | Modern | Queensland |
| S2d1 | KY595557 | Modern | Queensland |
| S2d1a | AF346964 | Modern | Northern Territory |
| S2d1a | KY595580 | Modern | Queensland |
| S2d2 | KY595549 | Modern | New South Wales |
| S2d2 | KY595592 | Modern | Queensland |
| S3 | AY289066 | Modern | Northern Territory |
| S3 | AY289067 | Modern | Northern Territory |
| S4 | AY289062 | Modern | Northern Territory |
| S5 | EF495220 | Modern | Kalumburu, Western Australia |

== Subclades ==
=== Tree ===
This phylogenetic tree of haplogroup S subclades is based on the paper by Mannis van Oven and Manfred Kayser Updated comprehensive phylogenetic tree of global human mitochondrial DNA variation and subsequent published research. The TMRCA for haplogroup S is between 49 and 51 KYA according to Nano Nagle's Aboriginal Australian mitochondrial genome variation – an increased understanding of population antiquity and diversity publication that published in 2017.

- S (64-40 kya) in Australia
  - S1 (53-32 kya) in Australia
    - S1a (44-29 kya) found in WA, NT, QLD and NSW
    - S1b (37-22 kya) found in NT, QLD and NSW
      - S1b1 (30-10 kya) found in NT and QLD
        - S1b1a (24-6 kya) found in QLD
      - S1b2 (17-3 kya) found in QLD
      - S1b3 (20-4 kya) found in QLD and NSW
  - S2 (44-22 kya) in Australia
    - S2a (38-18 kya) found in NT, QLD, NSW and TAS
      - S2a1 (31-12 kya) found in NSW, QLD and TAS
        - S2a1a (19-6 kya) found in NSW and QLD
      - S2a2 (38-11 kya) found in NT, QLD and NSW
    - S2b (42-18 kya) found in WA, NT, QLD and VIC
      - S2b1(27-9 kya) found in NT, QLD and VIC
      - S2b2 (37-12 kya) found in WA, NT and QLD
  - S-T152C!
    - S3 (17-1 kya) found in NT
    - S4 found in NT
    - S5 found in WA
  - S6 found in NSW

== See also ==
- Genealogical DNA test
- Genetic genealogy
- Human mitochondrial genetics
- Population genetics

Phylogenetic tree of human mitochondrial DNA (mtDNA) haplogroups

Mitochondrial Eve (L)

L0
L1–6

L1
L2

L3

L4
L5
L6
M
N

CZ
D
E
G
Q

O
A
S
R

I
W
X
Y
C
Z
B
F
R0

pre-JT

P

U
HV
JT
K
H
V
J
T
