= Haplogroup pre-JT =

Human mitochondrial DNA

Haplogroup R2'JT
- Possible time of origin: 42,600 to 67,100 YBP
- Possible place of origin: Probably West Asia
- Ancestor: R
- Descendants: R2, JT
- Defining mutations: 4216

Haplogroup pre-JT is a human mitochondrial DNA haplogroup (mtDNA). It is also called R2'JT.

== Origin ==
Haplogroup pre-JT is a descendant of the haplogroup R. It is characterised by the mutation T4216C. The pre-JT clade has two direct descendant lineages, haplogroup JT and haplogroup R2.

== Distribution ==
According to YFull MTree, haplogroup R2'JT has allegedly been sequenced in at least three individuals, among whom one came from ancient Egypt and one from modern Denmark. However, Ian Logan mutationally interpreted the Denmark sample as being a member of T1a.

One carrier of haplogroup R2'JT was found in an in-depth study of "108 Scandinavian Neolithic individuals".

== Subclades ==
Its major subclade is Haplogroup JT, which further divides into Haplogroup J and Haplogroup T. Its other subclade is Haplogroup R2, which has such branches as R2a, R2b, and R2c.

=== Tree ===
- R2'JT
  - R2
  - JT
    - J
    - T

== See also ==
- Genealogical DNA test
- Genetic genealogy
- Human mitochondrial genetics
- Population genetics

Phylogenetic tree of human mitochondrial DNA (mtDNA) haplogroups

Mitochondrial Eve (L)

L0
L1–6

L1
L2

L3

L4
L5
L6
M
N

CZ
D
E
G
Q

O
A
S
R

I
W
X
Y
C
Z
B
F
R0

pre-JT

P

U
HV
JT
K
H
V
J
T
