= Haplogroup E (mtDNA) =

Human mitochondrial DNA haplogroup

- Possible time of origin: 35,000 to 8,000 YBP
- Possible place of origin: east Sundaland or Fujian coast
- Ancestor: M9
- Descendants: E1, E2
- Defining mutations: 3027, 3705, 7598, 13626, 16390

In human mitochondrial genetics, haplogroup E is a human mitochondrial DNA (mtDNA) haplogroup typical for the Malay Archipelago. It is a subgroup of haplogroup M9.

== Origin ==
Two contrasting proposals have been made for the location and time of the origin of Haplogroup E. One view is that the clade was formed over 30,000 years ago, around the time of the Last Glacial Maximum, on the northeast coast of Sundaland (near modern Borneo). In this model, the haplogroup was dispersed by rising sea levels during the Late Glacial period.

In 2014, the mitochondrial DNA of an 8,000-year-old skeleton found on Liang Island, one of the Matsu Islands off the southeast China coast, was found to belong to Haplogroup E, with two of the four mutations characteristic of the E1 subgroup. From this, Ko and colleagues argue that Haplogroup E arose 8,000 to 11,000 years ago near the north Fujian coast, travelled to Taiwan with Neolithic settlers 6,000 years ago, and from there spread to Maritime Southeast Asia with the Austronesian language dispersal. Soares et al caution against over-emphasizing a single sample, and maintain that a constant molecular clock implies the earlier date (and more southerly origin) remains more likely.

== Distribution ==
Haplogroup E is found throughout Maritime Southeast Asia. It is nearly absent from mainland East Asia, where its sister group M9a (also found in Japan) is common. In particular, it is found among speakers of Austronesian languages, and it is rare even in Southeast Asia among speakers of other language families. It has been detected in populations of Taiwan, the Philippines, Indonesia, Malaysia (including Sabah of Borneo, but not the Orang Asli of peninsular Malaysia), coastal Papua New Guinea, and especially in the Chamorros of the Mariana Islands.

Of the four principal subclades, E1b and E2a are found mainly in Maritime Southeast Asia, while only E1a and E2b are also found in Taiwan. E2b has low diversity within Taiwan, suggesting that it arrived there about 5,000 years ago. The most common E subclade, E1a1a, has highest diversity in Taiwan, followed by the Philippines and Sulawesi. Moreover, other branches of E1a1 are largely confined to Taiwan.

Frequencies of MtDNA Haplogroup E
Population	Frequency	Count	Source	Subtypes
Chamorro (85 Guam, 14 Saipan, & 6 Rota)	0.924	105	Vilar et al 2013	E2a=68, E1a2=29
East Indonesian (Sulawesi, incl. 89 Manado, 64 Toraja, 46 Ujung Padang, & 38 Palu)	0.266	237	Hill et al 2007	E1a=42, E1b=9, E2=7, E1(xE1a, E1b)=5
Filipino (Mindanao)	0.214	70	Tabbada et al 2010, p. 24	E1a1a=10, E2(xE2b)=4, E1b=1
Filipino (Visayas)	0.214	112	Tabbada et al 2010, p. 24	E1a1a=18, E2(xE2b)=5, E1(xE1a1a, E1a2, E1b)=1
East Indonesian (Ambon)	0.163	43	Hill et al 2007	E1(xE1a, E1b)=3, E1a=2, E2=2
East Indonesian (Waingapu, Sumba)	0.160	50	Hill et al 2007	E1b=6, E1a=1, E2=1
Indonesian (Bangka)	0.147	34	Hill et al 2006	E=5
Borneo (89 Banjarmasin & 68 Kota Kinabalu)	0.146	157	Hill et al 2007	E1a=14, E2=5, E1b=3, E1(xE1a, E1b)=1
Filipino	0.125	64	Tabbada et al 2010, p. 24	E1a1a=5, E2(xE2b)=2, E1a2=1
Filipino (Luzon)	0.124	177	Tabbada et al 2010, p. 24	E1a1a=14, E1b=5, E2(xE2b)=2, E2b=1
Taiwan (aborigine)	0.120	640	Peng et al 2011	E=77
East Indonesian (Alor)	0.111	45	Hill et al 2007	E1a=3, E1b=2
East Indonesian (Mataram, Lombok)	0.091	44	Hill et al 2007	E1b=3, E1a=1
Indonesian (Padang, Sumatra)	0.083	24	Hill et al 2006	E=2
Indonesian (Medan, Sumatra)	0.071	42	Hill et al 2006	E=3
Indonesian (Pekanbaru, Medan, Bangka, Palembang, & Padang)	0.067	180	Hill et al 2007	E1a=6, E1b=4, E1(xE1a, E1b)=1, E2=1
Indonesian (Bali)	0.061	82	Hill et al 2007	E1a=3, E1b=1, E1(xE1a, E1b)=1
Filipino (Palawan)	0.050	20	Scholes et al 2011	E1a=1
Indonesian (Palembang, Sumatra)	0.036	28	Hill et al 2006	E=1
Tujia (Yanhe County, Guizhou)	0.034	29	Li et al 2007	E=1
Gelao (Daozhen County, Guizhou)	0.032	31	Li et al 2007	E=1
Indonesian (Java, incl. 36 from Tengger)	0.022	46	Hill et al 2007	E1b=1
Indonesian (Pekanbaru, Sumatra)	0.019	52	Hill et al 2006	E=1
Cham (Bình Thuận, Vietnam)	0.012	168	Peng et al 2010	E1a1a=1, E2a=1
Carolinian (Saipan)	0.000	17	Vilar et al 2013	-
Yi (Hezhang County, Guizhou)	0.000	20	Li et al 2007	-
Dong (Tianzhu County, Guizhou)	0.000	28	Li et al 2007	-
Batek (Malaysia)	0.000	29	Hill et al 2006	-
Cun (Hainan)	0.000	30	Peng et al 2011	-
Batak (Palawan)	0.000	31	Scholes et al 2011	-
Lingao (Hainan)	0.000	31	Peng et al 2011	-
Mendriq (Malaysia)	0.000	32	Hill et al 2006	-
Temuan (Malaysia)	0.000	33	Hill et al 2006	-
Danga (Hainan)	0.000	40	Peng et al 2011	-
Jahai (Malaysia)	0.000	51	Hill et al 2006	-
Senoi (Malaysia)	0.000	52	Hill et al 2006	-
Semelai (Malaysia)	0.000	61	Hill et al 2006	-
Gelao (Daozhen County, Guizhou)	0.000	102	Liu et al 2011	-
Li (Hainan)	0.000	346	Peng et al 2011	-

== Subclades ==
This phylogenetic tree of haplogroup E subclades is based on the paper by Mannis van Oven and Manfred Kayser Updated comprehensive phylogenetic tree of global human mitochondrial DNA variation and subsequent published research.

- E
  - E1
    - E1a
      - E1a1
        - E1a1a
          - E1a1a1
      - E1a2
    - E1b
      - E1b1
  - E2
    - E2a
    - E2b
      - E2b1
      - E2b2

== See also ==
- Genealogical DNA test
- Genetic genealogy
- Human mitochondrial genetics
- Population genetics
- Human mitochondrial DNA haplogroups

Phylogenetic tree of human mitochondrial DNA (mtDNA) haplogroups

Mitochondrial Eve (L)

L0
L1–6

L1
L2

L3

L4
L5
L6
M
N

CZ
D
E
G
Q

O
A
S
R

I
W
X
Y
C
Z
B
F
R0

pre-JT

P

U
HV
JT
K
H
V
J
T
