= Haplogroup O (mtDNA) =

Human mitochondrial DNA haplogroup

Haplogroup O mtDNA is a haplogroup derived from haplogroup N and found in Oceania. Specifically, it is found among Aboriginal Australians. Its defining mutations are G6755A, C9140T, and G16213A.

It is one of the rarest haplogroups. As of 2022, FamilyTreeDNA reports that only 4 people in their customer base who have tested their complete mitochondrial sequences are members of the haplogroup. YFull reports 9 known members, 8 of whom are stated to be from Australia. The haplogroup is 28 to 39 kilo years old.

The following table lists relevant GenBank samples:

Phylotree Haplogroup	YFull Haplogroup	GenBank ID	Alternate ID	State/Region
O	O-a1	KY595606	AUS41	Queensland
O	O-a1a	AY289059	Aus23	Northern Territory
O	O-a1a	KY595554	AUS39	Queensland
O	O-a1a	KY595619	AUS40	Queensland
O1	O-a2	KY595668	AUS38	Queensland
O1	O1	DQ404447	AUD38	Northern Territory desert
O1a	O1a	AY289056	Aus20	Northern Territory
O1a	O1a	AY289058	Aus22	Northern Territory

== Subclades ==
=== Tree ===
- O
  - O-a1
    - O-a1a
  - O1
    - O-a2
  - O1
    - O1a

== See also ==
- Genealogical DNA test
- Genetic genealogy
- Human mitochondrial genetics
- Population genetics
- Human mitochondrial DNA haplogroups

== Notes ==
Phylogenetic tree of human mitochondrial DNA (mtDNA) haplogroups

Mitochondrial Eve (L)

L0
L1–6

L1
L2

L3

L4
L5
L6
M
N

CZ
D
E
G
Q

O
A
S
R

I
W
X
Y
C
Z
B
F
R0

pre-JT

P

U
HV
JT
K
H
V
J
T
