= Human mitochondrial DNA haplogroup =

Haplogroup defined by differences in human mitochondrial DNA

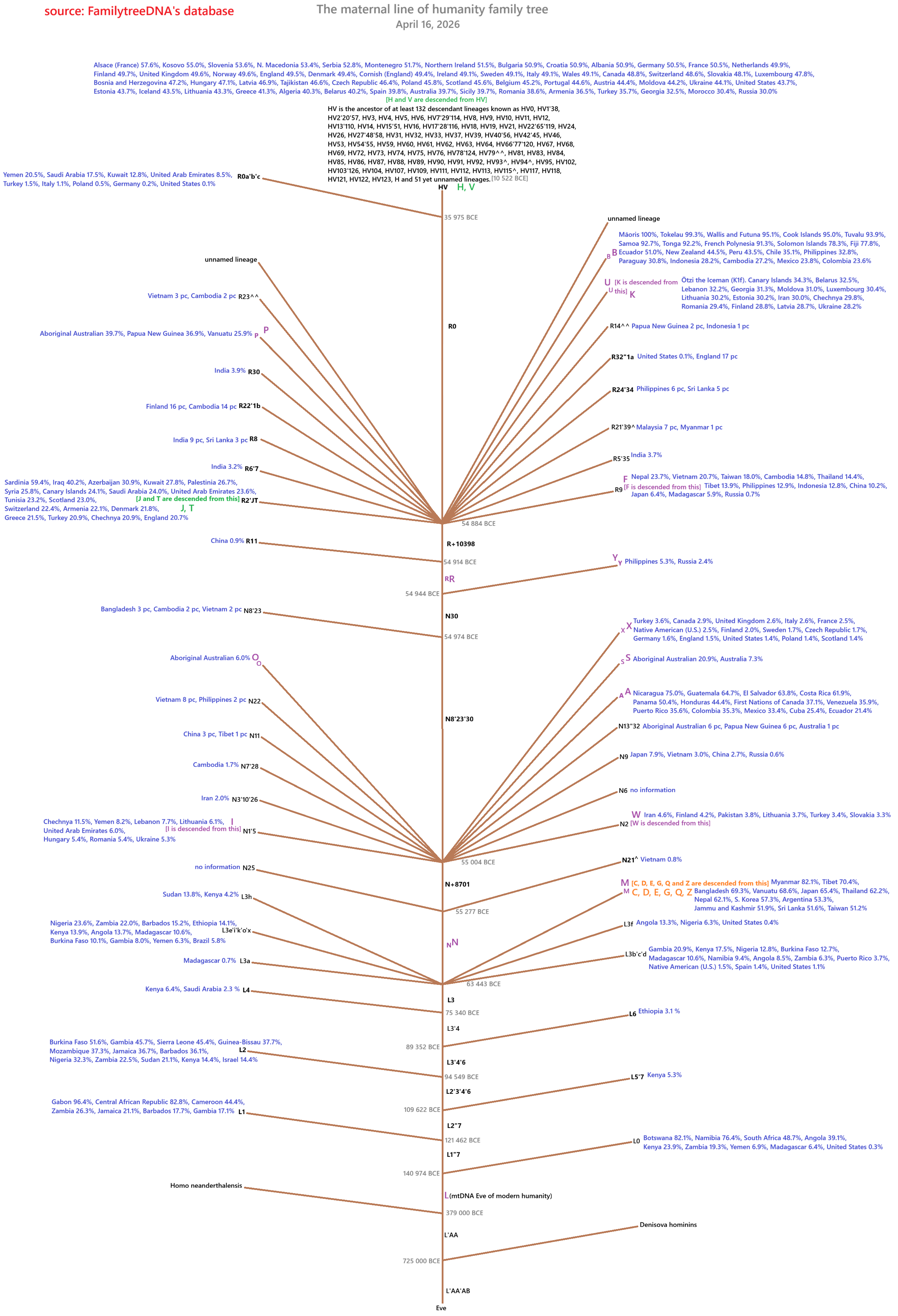
Maternal lineage family tree of humanity 16 April 2026

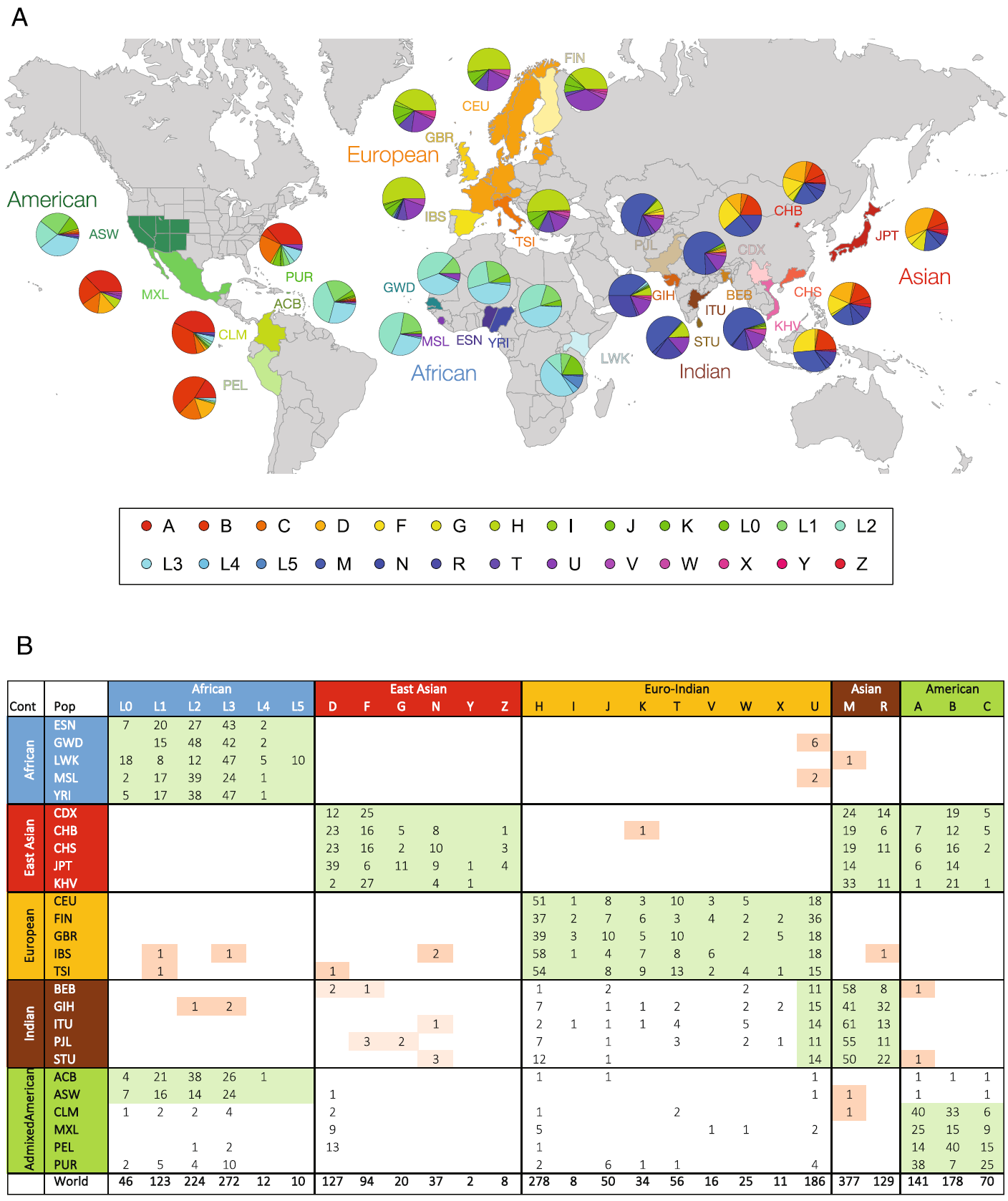
Contemporary human mtDNA haplogroup distribution, based on analysis of 2,054 individuals from 26 populations. (a) Pie charts on the map. (b) Counts of haplogroups in table format. For populations details, see 1000 Genomes Project#Human genome samples.

Mitochondria are the primary energy generator of the cell and have unique organelles that maintain their own DNA (mtDNA). In human genetics, human mitochondrial DNA haplogroups are collections of similar haplotypes defined by combinations of single nuclear polymorphism (SNPs) in mtDNA inherited from a common ancestor. Mitochondrial DNA is passed down through cytoplasmic inheritance, where, upon fertilization, the paternal mitochondria are degraded, leaving only the maternal mitochondria regardless of the offspring’s sex. This characteristic of mitochondrial inheritance allows geneticists to track the movement and divergence of different haplogroups from female lineages. Haplogroups are used to represent the major branch points on the mitochondrial phylogenetic tree. Understanding this mechanism of inheritance has helped population geneticists trace the matrilineal inheritance of modern humans back to human origins in Africa and the subsequent spread around the globe.

The letter names of the haplogroups (not just mitochondrial DNA haplogroups) run from A to Z. As haplogroups were named in the order of their discovery, the alphabetical ordering does not have any meaning in terms of actual genetic relationships.

The hypothetical woman at the root of all these groups (meaning just the mitochondrial DNA haplogroups) is the matrilineal most recent common ancestor (MRCA) for all currently living humans. She is commonly called Mitochondrial Eve.

The rate at which mitochondrial DNA mutates is known as the mitochondrial molecular clock. It is an area of ongoing research with one study reporting one mutation per 8000 years.

Recent research has shown that mitochondrial DNA haplogroups can influence risk for various diseases and cancers.

== Phylogeny ==
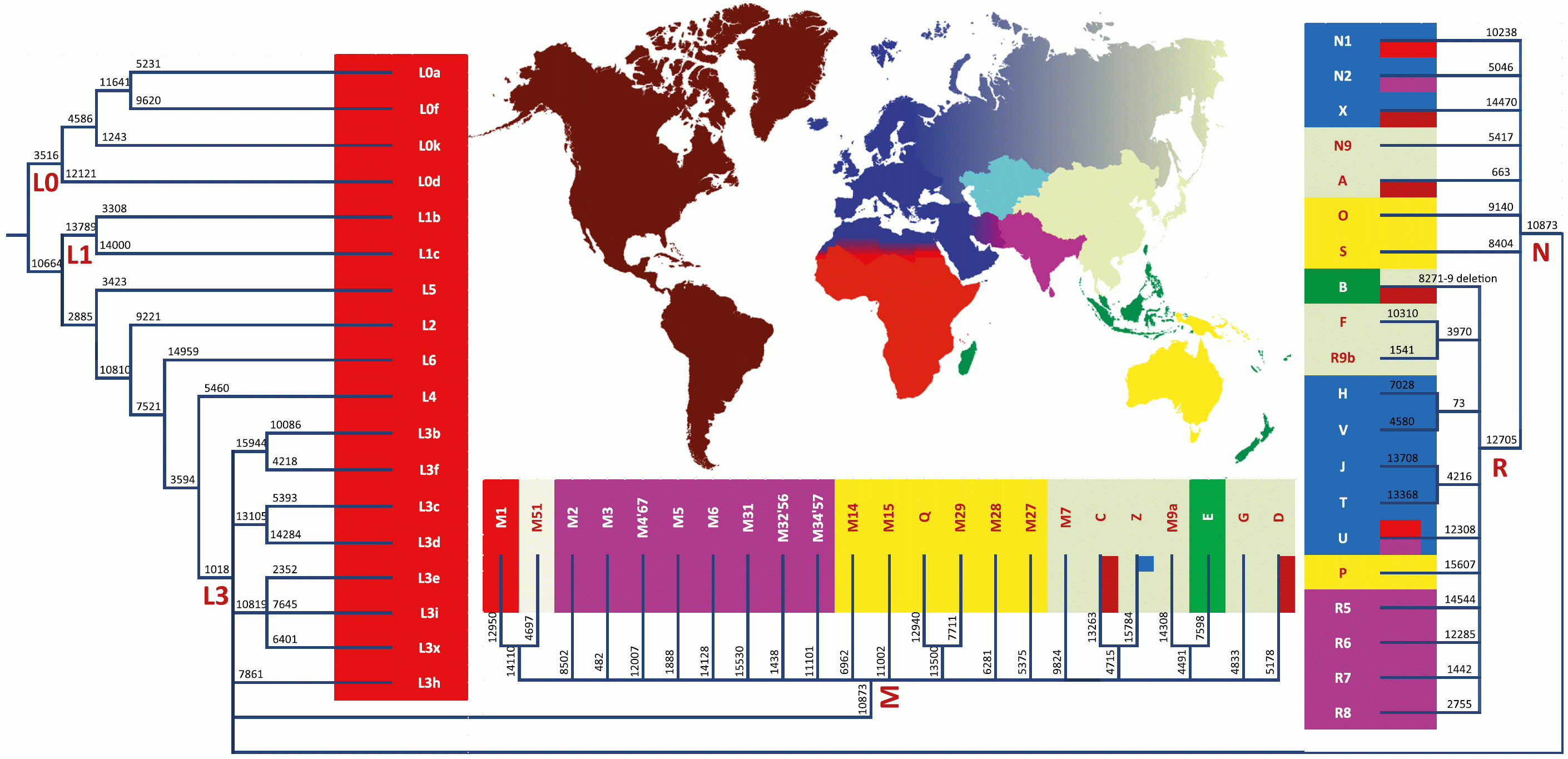
mtDNA haplogroup tree and distribution map. The numbers are haplogroup labels, reported according to the http://www.phylotree.org/ nomenclature, and give the location of one of the mutations leading to the derived haplotype. (Only a single branch defining marker, preferably from the coding region, is shown.) The main geographic features of haplogroup distribution are highlighted with colour.

Chart showing the evolution of mitochondrial DNA Haplogroups to MRCA.

This phylogenetic tree is based Van Oven (2009). In June 2022, an alternative phylogeny for haplogroup L was suggested

- L
  - L0
  - L1‑6
    - L1
    - L2‑6
      - L5
      - L2'3'4'6
        - L2
        - L3'4'6
          - L6
          - L3'4
            - L4
            - L3
              - N
                - N1: I
                - N2: W
                - N9: Y
                - A
                - S
                - X
                - R
                  - R0
                    - HV
                      - H
                      - V
                  - pre-JT
                    - JT
                      - J
                      - T
                  - R9: F
                  - R11'B: B
                  - P
                  - U
                    - U8: K
                - O
              - M
                - M9: E
                - M12'G: G
                - M29'Q: Q
                - D
                - M8: CZ
                  - C
                  - Z

== Major mtDNA haplogroups ==
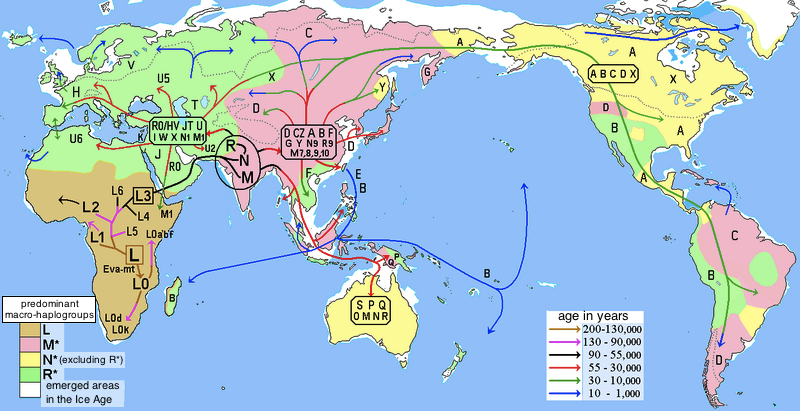
Estimated world map of human migrations based on mtDNA haplogroups.

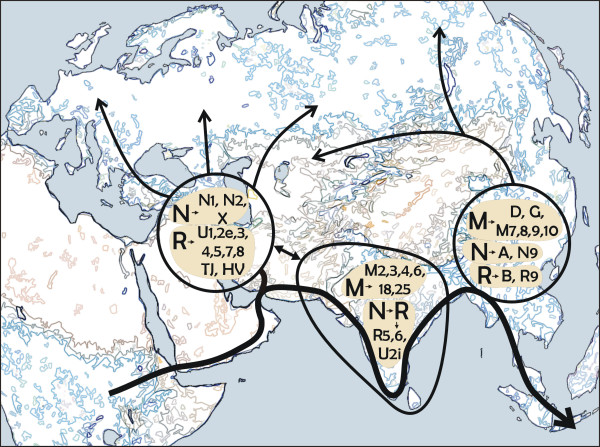
Inferred peopling of Eurasia based on mtDNA haplogroups.

=== Macro-haplogroup L ===
Macro-haplogroup L is the most basal of human mtDNA haplogroups, from which all other haplogroups descend (specifically, from haplogroup L3). These haplogroups represent the majority of the typical sub-Saharan mtDNA variability. Approximately 65% of the European L lineages mostly likely arrived during the Arab conquest of Iberian Peninsula and Sicily and during the period of Atlantic slave trade. The remaining 35% of L mtDNAs form European-specific subclades, revealing that the gene flows from sub-Saharan Africa toward Europe from 11,000 years ago.

- Macro-haplogroup L
  - Haplogroup L0
  - L1‑7
    - Haplogroup L1
    - L2‑7
      - L3'4'6
        - Haplogroup L2
        - L346
          - L34
            - Haplogroup L3
            - Haplogroup L4
          - Haplogroup L6
      - L5'7
        - Haplogroup L5
        - Haplogroup L7

=== Macro-haplogroup H ===
Macro-haplogroup H is found mostly in European countries and forms ~40-45% of the European mitochondrial gene pool. Its focus has been an important aspect of human genetic diversity studies for more than a decade. It is estimated that the coalescence time for Hg H is ~21,000 years ago, which led to the proposal that the clade was involved in a post-glacial population re-expansion from southwestern Europe to the rest of the continent. Most of the population along the westernmost Mediterranean coasts, separated by a narrow body of water, shows the highest frequencies of mitochondrial haplogroup H. The most basal nodes of the most frequent H sub-haplogroup, H1 and H3, are found among many western Europeans origins (primarily in the Iberian and Maghrebian regions).

A 2017 study published in BMC Genomic Data analyzed mitochondrial DNA haplogroup H in 750 individuals from southern Spain, finding 337 carriers primarily from the Andalusian provinces of Huelva and Granada. The research revealed that both populations exhibited a predominantly western European genetic profile, though Granada showed additional affinities with eastern Mediterranean populations, suggesting historical gene flow. Sub-haplogroups H1 and H3 were the most common, with molecular dating indicating origins around 16,000 and 13,000 years ago, respectively, and shared ancestry between Iberian and North African groups. Significant haplotype sharing between Andalusia and Morocco pointed to the Strait of Gibraltar as a corridor for maternal gene exchange rather than a genetic barrier. Overall, haplogroup H frequencies of about 39% in Huelva and 48% in Granada highlighted local diversity shaped by post-glacial expansions and later trans-Mediterranean interactions.

=== Macro-haplogroup M ===
Macro-haplogroup M is found mostly in Asia and the Americas. Its descendants are haplogroup M, haplogroup C, haplogroup Z, haplogroup D, haplogroup E, haplogroup G and haplogroup Q.

=== Macro-haplogroup N ===
Macro-haplogroup N is found mostly in Australia, the Americas and parts of Asia. Its descendants are haplogroup N, haplogroup O, haplogroup A, haplogroup S, haplogroup I, haplogroup W, haplogroup X and haplogroup Y, as well as macro-haplogroup R.

=== Macro-haplogroup R ===
Macro-haplogroup R is found mostly in Europe, Northern Africa, the Pacific and parts of Asia and the Americas. Its descendants are haplogroup R, haplogroup B, haplogroup F, haplogroup H, haplogroup V, haplogroup J, haplogroup T, haplogroup U and haplogroup K

== Chronology ==
| Haplogroup | Est. time of origin (kya) | Possible place of origin | Highest frequencies |
|---|---|---|---|
| L | 192.4 | Africa | |
| L1-6 | 166.8, 162 | East Africa | |
| L2-6 | 149.3 | East Africa | |
| L0 | 149.7 | East Africa | |
| L1 | 140.6 | Central Africa | |
| L2'3'4'6 | 114.7 | | |
| L5 | 120.2, 110.7 | | |
| L3'4'6 | 105.3 | | |
| L2 | 89.3 | | |
| L3'4 | 86.1 | | |
| L6 | 74.1 | | |
| L3 | 71.6 | East Africa | |
| N | 71.2* | East Africa or West Asia | |
| M | 60.6* | East Africa, West Asia or South Asia | |
| R | 66.6* | South Asia or Southeast Asia | |
| L4 | 63.3 | | |
| M12'G | 56.7 | | |
| U | 54 | North-East Africa or India (South Asia) | |
| R2'JT | 54.7 | Middle East | |
| Q | 37.8 | | |
| JT | 50.3, 34.8 | Middle East | |
| U8 | 50.2 | Western Asia | |
| B | 50.7 | | |
| P | 50 | | |
| D | 48.3, 41.1 | | |
| R9 | 47.2 | | |
| F | 43.4, 29.2 | | |
| M8 | 42.7, 44 | | |
| U4'9 | 42 | Central Asia | |
| A | 40.5, 29.2 | | |
| S | 40.5 | | |
| O | 40.5 | | |
| CZ | 36.5 | | |
| G | 35.7, 37.3 | | |
| U5 | 35 | Western Asia | |
| U6 | 35 | North Africa | |
| J | 32.6 | | |
| X | 31.8, 40.5 | | |
| K | 31.4 | | |
| C | 28.3, 27.4 | | |
| E | 27.4, 32.7 | | |
| U5a | 27 | | |
| HV | 27.1, 28 | Near East | |
| J1a | 27 | Near East | |
| T | 26.8, 29.9 | Mesopotamia | |
| K1 | 27 | | |
| I | 26.3, 14 | | |
| Z | 24.3, 27.4 | | |
| J1 | 24 | Near East | |
| Y | 22.3, 35.2 | | |
| W | 21.2, 28.7 | | |
| U4 | 20 | Central Asia | |
| X2 | 20 | | |
| H | 18.6, 19.4 | Western Asia | |
| J1b | 11 | | |
| V | 13.6, 8.5 | | |
| X2a | 13 | North America | |
| H1 | 12 | | |
| H3 | 12 | | |
| X1 | 10 | | |

== Geographical distribution ==
A 2004 paper suggested that the haplogroups most common in modern West Asian, North African and European populations were: A1, H, J, K, N1, T, U4, U5, V, X1, and W.

African haplogroups: L0, L1, L2, L3, L4, L5, L6, T, U5a

Australian and Oceanian haplogroups: M42a, M42c, M14, M15, Q, S, O, N, P. (Refs 1, 2, 3, 4, 5, 6)

Asian and native American haplogroups: A, B, F, C, D, W, M, D1, N, K, U, T, A2, B2, C1, Z, U, X2, X6 many number variants to each section

== Research software ==
=== Assignment ===
- mtHap: James Lick's tool (multiple input formats).
- YSEQ mt Clade Finder: FASTA based haplogroup tool. Replaced HAPLOFIND.
- HaploGrep: VCF based tool.
- Haplocheck: Mitoverse's tool for both WGS and WES.
- Haplotracker: A short fragment tool.
- Haplogroup Finder: Ian Logan's SNP to haplogroup tool.

=== Dating ===
- mtDNA Mutation Computer Model: Ian Logan's mutation calculator.

=== Phylogeny ===
- FTDNA's discover tool for browsing their new mtDNA Haplotree. (Released 2025-02-25)
- FTDNA's mtDNA Haplotree: Mostly based on PhyloTree Build 17 but with the addition of haplogroup L7.
- FTDNA's Mitotree: "Classic" view of FTDNA's mtDNA tree.
- YFull's MTree: An mtDNA tree. Faster loading (simpler).
- PhyloTree_{mt}: A traditional mtDNA tree (last updated 2016-02-18).
- HIP: Haplogroup trees.

=== Maps ===
==== Ancient ====
- HIP Haplomap: Ancient uniparental map.
- AH DNA: Nicky Rosenblatt's ancient uniparental map.
- Ancient DNA: An aDNA map made with Map Maker.

==== Modern ====
- HRAS mtDNA: A heatmap generator.

=== Databases ===
==== Ancient ====
- AmtDB: An database of ancient mtDNA samples.
- All Ancient DNA Dataset: Carlos Quiles' uniparental database (with BAM).

==== Modern ====
- GenBank mtDNA Sequence Checker: Ian Logan's GenBank based accession matching tool.
- mitoYDNA: A uniparental database.
- MITOMAP: An mtDNA genome database.

== See also ==
- Human mitochondrial genetics
- Genetic genealogy
- Matrilineality
- Human Y-chromosome DNA haplogroups
- Population genetics
