= Haplogroup L6 =

African mitochondrial DNA grouping indicating common ancestry

- Possible time of origin: 81,500-129,800 YBP
- Possible place of origin: East Africa
- Ancestor: L3'4'6
- Descendants: L6a, L6b
- Defining mutations: 146, 152, 185C, 709, 770, 961, 1461, 4964, 5267, 6002, 6284, 9332, 10978, 11116, 11743, 12771, 13710, 14791, 14959, 5244, 15289, 15499, 16048, 16224

In human mitochondrial genetics, Haplogroup L6 is a human mitochondrial DNA (mtDNA) haplogroup. It is a small haplogroup local to the Ethiopian highlands and Yemen.

== Distribution ==
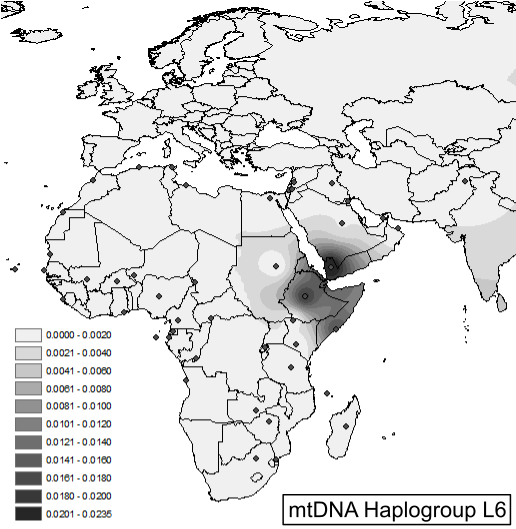
Projected spatial frequency distribution for haplogroup L6.

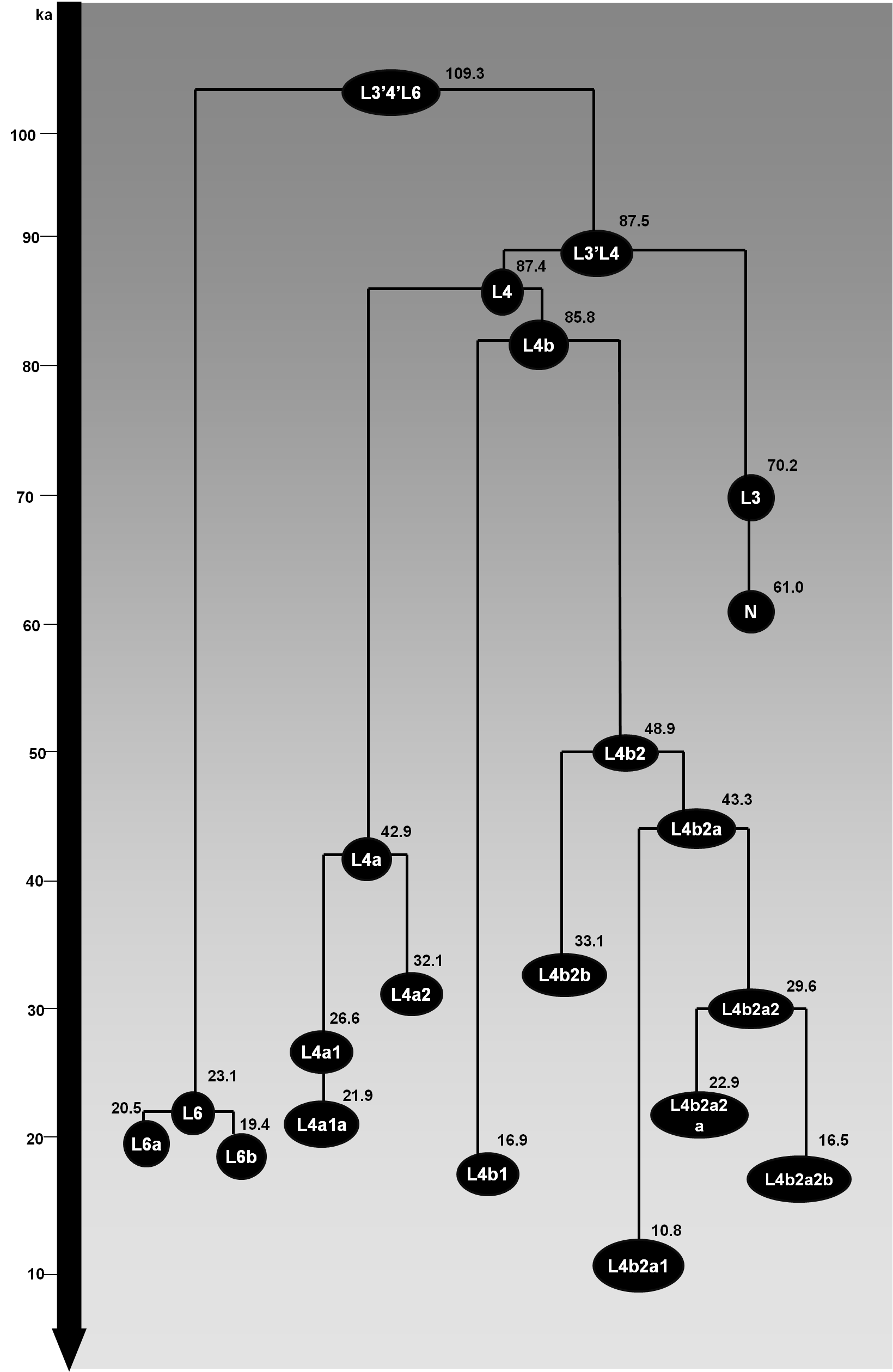
Schematic tree of mtDNA haplogroup L6 (and L4). Ages (in ka) indicated are maximum likelihood estimates obtained for the whole-mtDNA genome.

This haplogroup has been found only in Yemen and Ethiopia.

== Subclades ==
=== Tree ===
This phylogenetic tree of haplogroup M subclades is based on the paper by Mannis van Oven and Manfred Kayser Updated comprehensive phylogenetic tree of global human mitochondrial DNA variation and subsequent published research.

- L3'4'6
  - L6
    - L6a
    - L6b

== See also ==
- Genealogical DNA test
- Genetic genealogy
- Human mitochondrial genetics
- Population genetics
- Human mitochondrial DNA haplogroups
