= Haplogroup L4 =

African mitochondrial DNA grouping indicating common ancestry

- Possible time of origin: 90–80 kya
- Possible place of origin: East Africa
- Ancestor: L3'4
- Descendants: L4a, L4b
- Defining mutations: 5460, 16362

Haplogroup L4 is a human mitochondrial DNA (mtDNA) haplogroup. It is a small maternal clade primarily restricted to Africa.

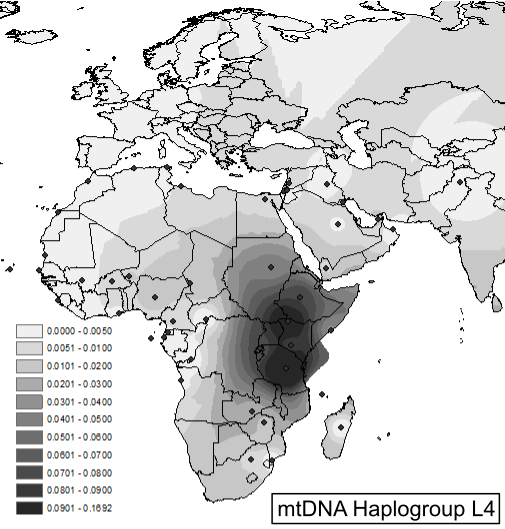
Projected spatial frequency distribution for haplogroup L4.

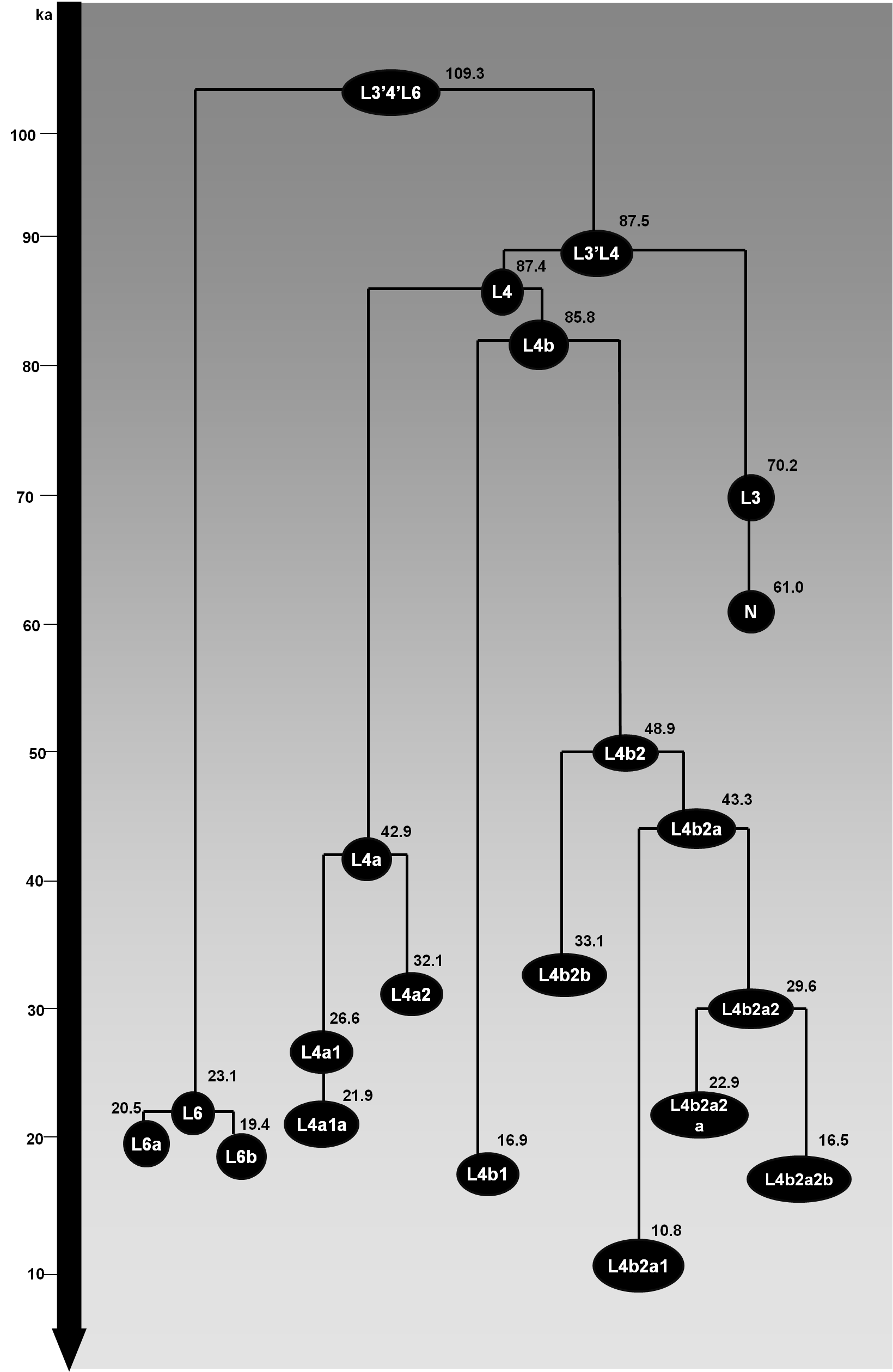
Schematic tree of mtDNA haplogroup L4. Ages (in ka) indicated are maximum likelihood estimates obtained for the whole-mtDNA genome.

L4 is important in East Africa. The highest frequencies are in Tanzania among the Hadza at 60-83% and Sandawe at 48%.

It has two branches, L4a and L4b. Subgroup L4a was formerly called L7 and considered a separate subclade of L3'4'7. It has been recognized as a subclade of L4, with L3 as its outgroup by Behar et al. (2008). The parent clade L3'4 is to have emerged at 106–66 kya. L4 is not much later than this, estimated at 87 kya by Fernandes et al. (2015).

== Phylogeny ==
The following phylogeny is based on van Oven and Kayser (2008).

- L3'4
  - L4
    - L4a (formerly known as L7), mutations: 195C, 3357, 5460, 10373, 11253, 11344, 11485, 12414, 13174, 14302, 16260.
      - L4a1
        - L4a1a
      - L4a2
    - L4b, mutations: 709, 3918.
      - L4b1
      - L4b2 (formerly known as L3g or L4g)
        - L4b2a
          - L4b2a1
          - L4b2a2
            - L4b2a2a
            - L4b2a2b
        - L4b2b
