= Haplogroup L5 =

Human mitochondrial DNA grouping indicating common ancestry

- Possible time of origin: 114,200-126,200 YBP
- Possible place of origin: East Africa, Upper Nile Valley
- Ancestor: L2-6
- Descendants: L5a, L5c
- Defining mutations: 3423, 7972, 12432, 12950

Haplogroup L5 is a human mitochondrial DNA (mtDNA) clade. It was previously known as L1e.

== Distribution ==
L5 is a small haplogroup centered in East Africa. The highest frequency is in Mbuti Pygmies from Eastern Central Africa at 15%. It is present in relatively small frequencies in Tanzania (Sandawe and others), Kenya, Chad, Ethiopia, Sudan, Nubia, Egypt (Note: Sample UPE52 is subclade L5a.) and Saudi Arabia.

Haplogroup L5 has been observed among specimens at the island cemetery in Kulubnarti, Sudan, which date from the Early Christian period (AD 550–800).

== Subclades ==
=== Tree ===
This phylogenetic tree of haplogroup L5 subclades is based on the paper by Mannis van Oven and Manfred Kayser Updated comprehensive phylogenetic tree of global human mitochondrial DNA variation and subsequent published research.

- Most Recent Common Ancestor (MRCA)
  - L1-6
    - L2-6
      - L5
        - L5a
          - L5a1
            - L5a1a
            - L5a1b
            - L5a1c
          - L5a2
        - L5c
          - L5c1
          - L5c2
