= Haplogroup I =

Haplogroup I may refer to:

- Haplogroup I (mtDNA), a human mitochondrial DNA (mtDNA) haplogroup
- Haplogroup I (Y-DNA), a human Y-chromosome (Y-DNA) haplogroup
