= Haplogroup I2 =

Haplogroup I2 may refer to:

- Haplogroup I-M438 (Y-DNA)
- Haplogroup I2'3 (mtDNA)
