= Haplogroup N =

Haplogroup N may refer to:

- Haplogroup N-M231, a human Y-chromosome (Y-DNA) haplogroup
- Haplogroup N (mtDNA), a human mitochondrial DNA (mtDNA) haplogroup
