= Haplogroup W =

Human mitochondrial DNA (mtDNA) haplogroup

- Possible time of origin: 23,900 ybp
- Possible place of origin: West Asia
- Ancestor: N2
- Descendants: W1, C194T, W3, W4, W5, W6, W7
- Defining mutations: 195 204 207 1243 3505 5460 8251 8994 11947 15884C 16292

Haplogroup W is a human mitochondrial DNA (mtDNA) haplogroup.

== Origin ==
Haplogroup W is believed to have originated around 23,900 years ago in Western Asia. It is descended from the haplogroup N2.

== Distribution ==
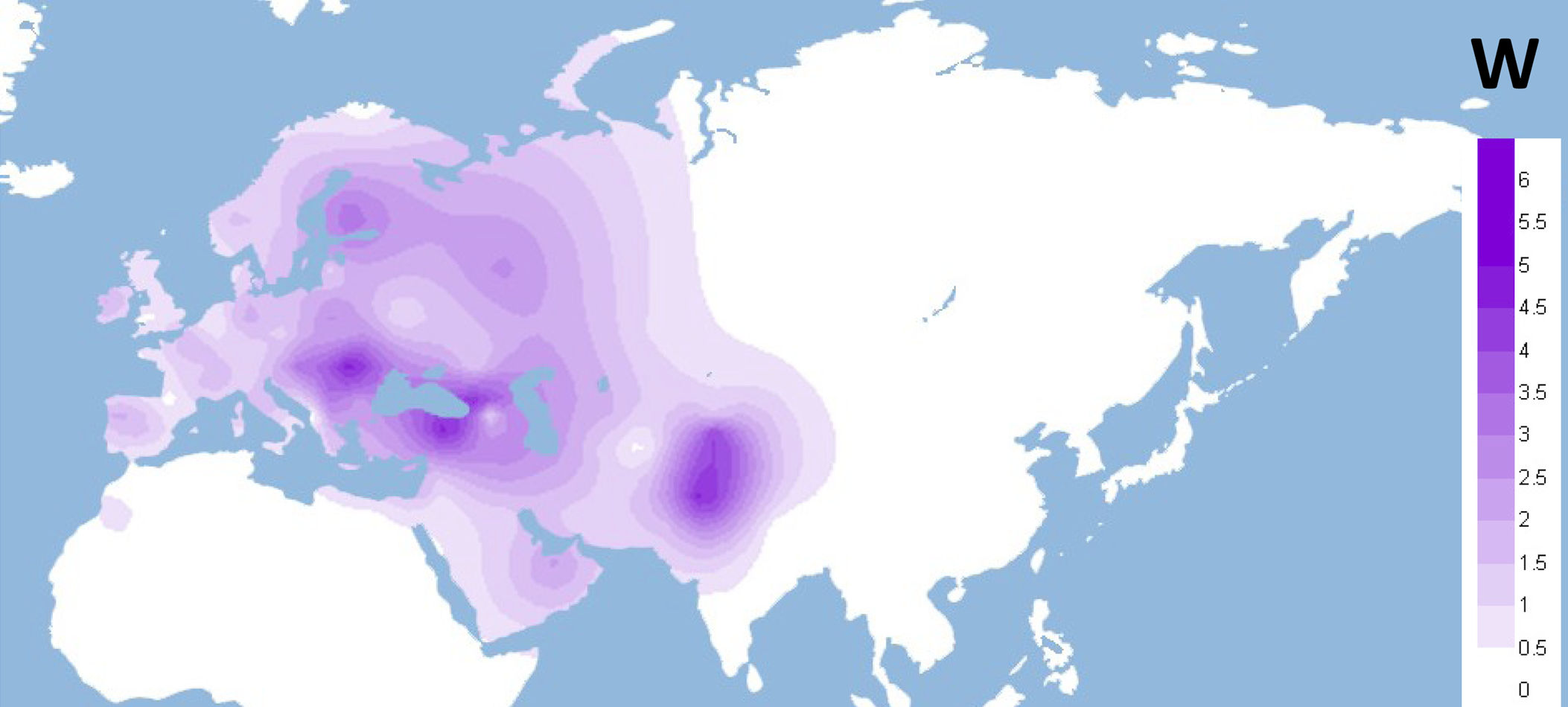
Projected spatial distribution of haplogroup W.

Haplogroup W is found in Europe, Western Asia, and South Asia. It is widely distributed at low frequencies, with a high concentration in Northern Pakistan. Haplogroup W is also found in the Maghreb among Algerians (1.08%-3.23%) and in Siberia among Yakuts (6/423 = 1.42%).

Additionally, the clade has been observed among ancient Egyptian mummies excavated at the Abusir el-Meleq archaeological site in Middle Egypt, which date from the Ptolemaic Kingdom.

The W5 subclade has been found in a fossil associated with the Starčevo culture (Lánycsók site; 1/1 or 100%).

Ancient DNA analysis found that the medieval individual Sungir 6 (730-850 cal BP) belonged to the W3a1 subclade.

== Subclades ==
=== Tree ===
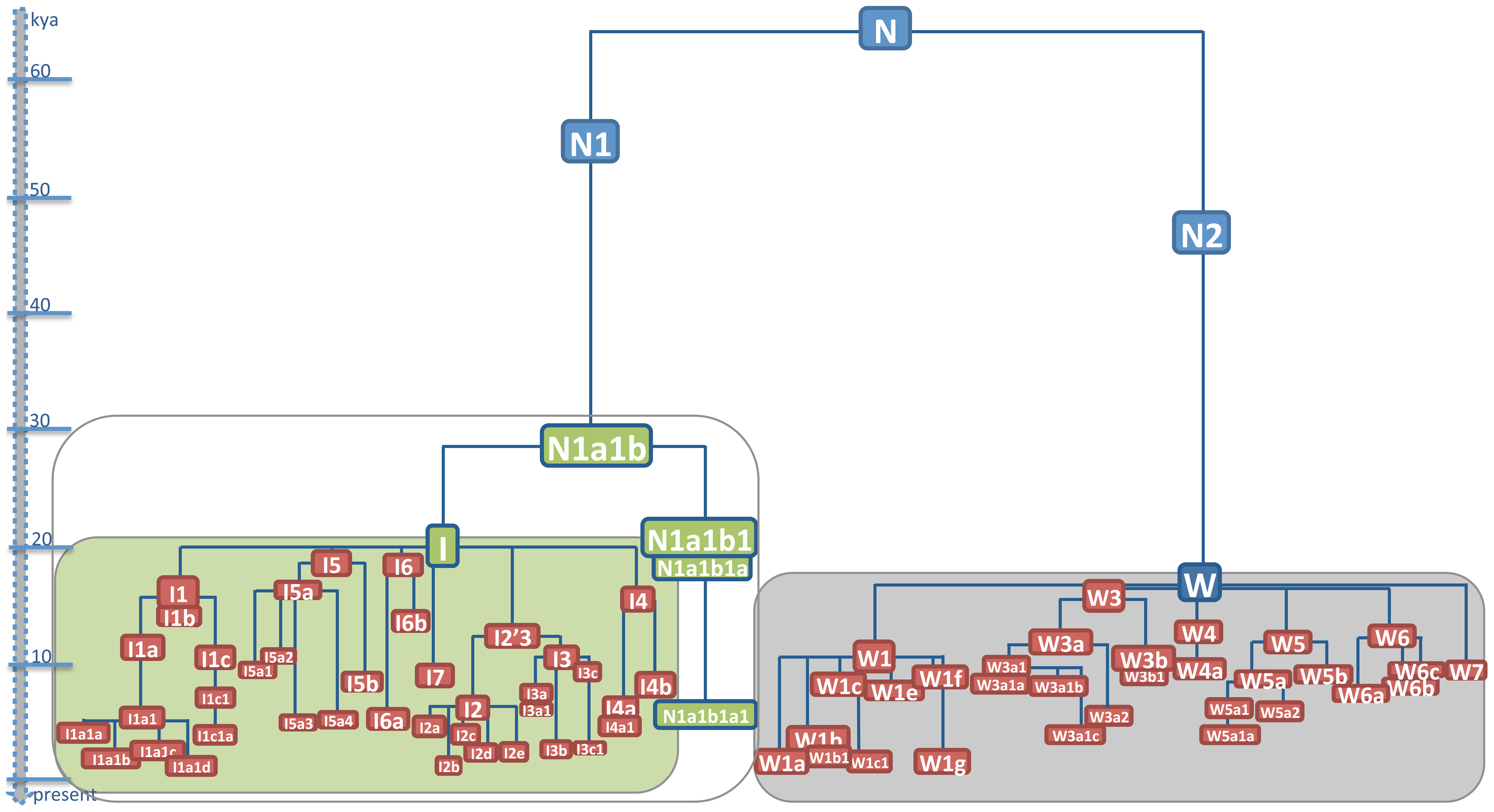
Phylogenetic tree of haplogroups I (left) and W (right). Kya in the left scale bar stands for thousand years ago.

This phylogenetic tree of haplogroup W subclades is based on the paper by Mannis van Oven and Manfred Kayser Updated comprehensive phylogenetic tree of global human mitochondrial DNA variation and subsequent published research.

- W
  - W1 – Italy, Poland, Czech Republic, Slovenia, Finland, Spain, Qashqai people of Iran
    - W1a – Finns
    - W1b
      - W1b1 – Finns
    - W1-T119C
      - W1c – Poland, Persians from Iran
        - W1c1
      - W1i
    - W1d - Iraqi Jews
    - W1e
      - W1e1
        - W1e1a
    - W1f – Italy
    - W1g – England, Belgium, Portugal, Gitanos (Roma people of Spain)
    - W1h – Nordic countries, England, Croatia, Ashkenazi Jews
      - W1h1 – Italians
  - W-C194T
    - W3 - Turkey, Azerbaijan, India (Jammu and Kashmir, Tamil Nadu)
      - W3a
        - W3a1 – Armenians, Turkey (Turkish, Kurd), France (Toulouse, Sarthe), Italy (Tuscany, Sardinia, Sicily, Umbria, Campania, Trentino-Alto Adige), Hungary, Poland, Ukraine, Belarus, Russia (Sunghir6 from 750 - 900 ybp Vladimir Oblast, Sverdlovsk Oblast, Omsk Oblast, Ingushetia, Volga Tatar, Chechens), Denmark, Berbers from Morocco, Pakistan (Pashtun, Kho), India, Singapore, United States
          - W3a1a
            - W3a1a1 – Polish people, Ashkenazi Jews
            - W3a1a2 - Russia (Nizhny Novgorod Oblast, Tatar from Buinsk)
            - W3a1a3 - Poland (Podkarpackie), United States
            - W3a1a+T9090C - Pakistan (Kho)
            - W3a1a+A15325G - Italy (Napoli)
          - W3a1b – Pakistan (Pashtuns, Sindhi, Azad Kashmir), India (New Delhi, Andhra Pradesh), Bangladesh (Bengali), Thailand (Mon, Thai), China (Shanghai), United States (Hispanic)
          - W3a1-T199C
            - W3a1c - England, United States, Slovakia, Russia (Ryazan Oblast, Tambov Oblast, Bashkortostan), Kazakhstan, China (Daur)
            - W3a1d – Hungarians, Serbia, Republika Srpska, Latvia, Poland, Ukraine, Russia (Ulyanovsk Oblast, Yakuts), New Zealand
        - W3a2 – France (Seine-Maritime), Poland, India, Uygurs from China
      - W3b – Italy (Calabria), Albania, Serbia, Romania (Bucharest), Bulgarians, Turkey, Iraq (Assyrian), Iran, Armenians, Kurds, Tajiks (especially Wakhis and other Pamiris), Pakistan (Burusho, Kho, Makrani), Cambodia, Uyghurs
        - W3b1 – Austrians, Ashkenazi Jews
    - W4 - Denmark, Poland, Italy (Sardinia, Umbria), Pakistan (Sindhis), India (Jammu and Kashmir), Mongolia, United Kingdom (ancient Orkney)
      - W4a - England (St Mary Spital, pre-Black Death medieval London, ca. 725 years before present), Ukraine (Russian speaker from Kharkiv Oblast), India, China (Xinjiang ca. 1412 - 1529 years before present)
        - W4a1 – Finns, Sweden (Dalarna County), Poland (Mazowieckie), Turkey, England, United States
      - W4b - Italy, Mongolia
      - W4c - Italy, Poland, India
      - W4d - Albania, Turkey (Kurds), Iraq (Baghdad), Iran (Lorestan), Pakistan (Kho)
    - W5 - Denmark, Poland, Serbia, Algeria (Batna), Morocco (Berber), Iran (Persian), United States
      - W5a - Germany, Denmark
        - W5a1
          - W5a1a – Flemish people, Norway (Rogaland), Denmark, Italy (Tuscany), Canary Islands, Brazil, Irish people, Polish people, Russia (Belgorod Oblast), Canada, United States
            - W5a1a1 - England, Estonia, Russia (Adyghe in Kabardino-Balkaria)
              - W5a1a1a
        - W5a2 - United Kingdom, Denmark, Germany (North Rhine-Westphalia), Poland
          - W5a2b
      - W5b - Portugal (Azores, Leiria)
        - W5b1 - Denmark
          - W5b1a
    - W6 – Sindhis, Han Chinese from Xi'an city, Italy, Kuwait, Persians from Iran, Russia (North Ossetia, Belgorod Oblast), Kazakhstan, Mongolia
      - W6a
      - W6b
        - W6b1 – Iran, United Arab Emirates, Bahrain, Saudi Arabia
      - W6c – Greece, England, Ireland, Ingushetia
        - W6c1 – Armenians from Turkey
          - W6c1a – Armenians from Turkey, Kurds, Greece
      - W6d
    - W7 – Armenians
    - W8 – Bedouin of Israel, Yemen, Iran
    - W9
      - W9a – Armenians from Turkey, Kurds from Turkey

== Famous members ==
- Biologist Rudolf Raff was a member of haplogroup W.
- Journalist and investor Laurel Touby is a member of haplogroup W3a.
- Businesswoman and television host Martha Stewart belongs to haplogroup W6.

== See also ==
- Genealogical DNA test
- Genetic genealogy
- Human mitochondrial genetics
- Population genetics

Phylogenetic tree of human mitochondrial DNA (mtDNA) haplogroups

Mitochondrial Eve (L)

L0
L1–6

L1
L2

L3

L4
L5
L6
M
N

CZ
D
E
G
Q

O
A
S
R

I
W
X
Y
C
Z
B
F
R0

pre-JT

P

U
HV
JT
K
H
V
J
T
