= Haplogroup L2 =

Human mitochondrial DNA grouping indicating common ancestry

- Possible time of origin: 80,000–111,100 YBP
- Possible place of origin: West Africa or Central Africa
- Ancestor: L2─6 (L2'3'4'6)
- Descendants: L2a─d, L2e
- Defining mutations: 146, 150, 152, 2416, 8206, 9221, 10115, 13590, 16311!, 16390

Haplogroup L2 is a human mitochondrial DNA (mtDNA) haplogroup with a widespread modern distribution, particularly in Sub-Saharan Africa. Its L2a subclade is the most frequent and widely distributed mtDNA cluster on the continent, as well as among descendants of Africans in the Americas.

== Origin ==
L2 is a common lineage in Africa. It is believed to have evolved between 87,000 and 107,000 years ago or approx. 90,000 YBP. Its age and widespread distribution and diversity across the continent makes its exact origin point within Africa difficult to trace with any confidence. Several L2 haplotypes observed in Guineans and other West Africa populations shared genetic matches with East Africa and North Africa. An origin for L2b, L2c, L2d and L2e in West or Central Africa seems likely. The early diversity of L2 can be observed all over the African Continent, but as we can see in Subclades section below, the highest diversity is found in West Africa. Most of subclades are largely confined to West and western-Central Africa.

According to a 2015 study, "results show that lineages in Southern Africa cluster with Western/Central African lineages at a recent time scale, whereas, eastern lineages seem to be substantially more ancient. Three moments of expansion from a Central African source are associated to L2: one migration at 70–50 ka into Eastern or Southern Africa, postglacial movements 15–10 ka into Eastern Africa; and the southward Bantu Expansion in the last 5 ka. The complementary population and L0a phylogeography analyses indicate no strong evidence of mtDNA gene flow between eastern and southern populations during the later movement, suggesting low admixture between Eastern African populations and the Bantu migrants. This implies that, at least in the early stages, the Bantu expansion was mainly a demic diffusion with little incorporation of local populations".

== Distribution ==
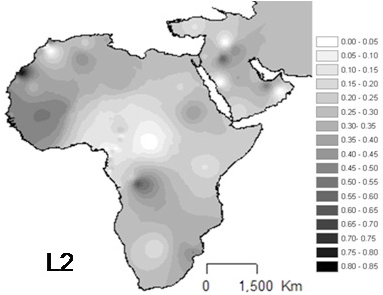
Projected spatial distribution of haplogroup L2 in Africa.

L2 is the most common haplogroup in Africa, and it has been observed throughout the continent. It is found in approximately one third of Africans and their recent descendants.

The highest frequency occurs among the Mbuti Pygmies (64%). Also strong presence in Western Africa populations in Senegal (43–54%). Also important in Non-Bantu populations of East Africa (44%), in Sudan and Mozambique.

It is particularly abundant in Chad and the Kanembou (38% of the sample), but is also relatively frequent in Nomadic Arabs (33%) and Akan people (~33%)

== Subclades ==
Haplogroup L2 family tree

- Haplogroup L2
  - - L2a
    - - L2b
      - L2c
    - L2d
  - L2e

L2 has five main subhaplogroups: L2a, L2b, L2c, L2d and L2e. Of these lineages, the most common subclade is L2a, which is found in Africa, the Levant, and in the Americas.

Haplogroup L2 has been observed among specimens at the island cemetery in Kulubnarti, Sudan, which date from the Early Christian period (AD 550–800).

=== Haplogroup L2a ===
L2a is widespread in Africa and the most common and widely distributed sub-Saharan African Haplogroup and is also somewhat frequent at 19% in the Americas among descendants of the continent of AfroEurAsia using the Out of Africa Theory or Model. (Salas et al., 2002). L2a has a possible date of origin approx. 48,000 YBP.

It is particularly abundant in Chad (38% of the sample; 33% undifferentiated L2 among Chad Arabs,), and in Non-Bantu populations of East Africa (Kenya, Uganda and Tanzania) at 38%. About 33% in Mozambique and 32% in Ghana.

This subclade is characterised by mutations at 2789, 7175, 7274, 7771, 11914, 13803, 14566 and 16294. It represents 52% of the total L2 and is the only subclade of L2 to be widespread all over Africa.

The wide distribution of L2a and diversity makes identifying a geographical origin difficult. The main puzzle is the almost ubiquitous Haplogroup L2a, which may have spread East and West along the South East Africa Corridor in after the Last Glacial Maximum, or the origins of these expansions may lie earlier, at the beginnings of the Later Stone Age ~ 40,000 years ago.

In East Africa L2a was found 15% in Nile Valley–Nubia, 5% of Egyptians, 14% of Cushite speakers, 15% of Semitic Amhara people, 10% of Gurage, 6% of Tigray-Tigrinya people, 13% of Ethiopians and 5% of Yemenis.

Haplogroup L2a also appears in North Africa, with the highest frequency 20% Tuareg, Fulani (14%). Found also among some Algeria Arabs, it is found at 10% among Moroccan Arabs, some Moroccan Berbers and Tunisian Berbers.

In patients who are given the drug stavudine to treat HIV, Haplogroup L2a is associated with a lower likelihood of peripheral neuropathy as a side effect.

==== Haplogroup L2a1 ====
L2a can be further divided into L2a1, harboring the transition at 16309 (Salas et al. 2002).

This subclade is observed at varying frequencies in West Africa among the Mandinka, Wolof, and others; among the North Africans; in the Sahel among the Hausa, Fulbe, and others; in Central Africa among the Bakongo, Fali, and others; in South Africa among the Khoisan family including the Khwe and Bantu speakers; and in East Africa among the Kikuyu from Kenya.

All L2 clades present in Ethiopia are mainly derived from the two subclades, L2a1 and L2b. L2a1 is defined by mutations at 12693, 15784 and 16309. Most Ethiopian L2a1 sequences share mutations at nps 16189 and 16309. However, whereas the majority (26 out of 33) Afro Americans share Haplogroup L2a complete sequences could be partitioned into four subclades by substitutions at nps L2a1e-3495, L2a1a-3918, L2a1f-5581, and L2a1i-15229. None of those sequences, were observed in Ethiopian 16309 L2a1 samples. (Salas 2002) et al.

Haplogroup L2a1 has also been observed among the Mahra (4.6%).

Haplogroup L2a1 has been found in ancient fossils associated with the Pre-Pottery Neolithic culture at Tell Halula, Syria. A specimen excavated at the Savanna Pastoral Neolithic site of Luxmanda in Tanzania also carried the L2a1 clade. Admixture clustering analysis further indicated that the individual bore significant ancestry from the ancient Levant, confirming ancestral ties between the makers of the Savanna Pastoral Neolithic and the Pre-Pottery Neolithic.

===== Haplogroup L2a1a =====
Subclade L2a1a is defined by substitutions at 3918, 5285, 15244, and 15629. There are two L2a clusters that are well represented in southeastern Africans, L2a1a and L2a1b, both defined by transitions at quite stable HVS-I positions. Both of these appear to have an origin in West Africa or North West Africa (as indicated by the distribution of matching or neighboring types), and to have undergone dramatic expansion either in South East Africa or in a population ancestral to present-day Southeastern Africans.

The very recent starbursts in subclades L2a1a and L2a2 suggest a signature for the Bantu expansions, as also proposed by Pereira et al. (2001).

L2a1a is defined by a mutation at 16286. The L2a1a founder candidate dates to 2,700 (SE 1,200) years ago. (Pereira et al. 2001). However, L2a1a, as defined by a substitution at (np 16286) (Salas et al. 2002), is now supported by a coding-region marker (np 3918) (fig. 2A) and was found in four of six Yemeni L2a1 lineages. L2a1a occurs at its highest frequency in Southeastern Africa (Pereira et al. 2001; Salas et al. 2002). Both the frequent founder haplotype and derived lineages (with 16092 mutation) found among Yemenis have exact matches within Mozambique sequences (Pereira et al. 2001; Salas et al. 2002). L2a1a also occurs at a smaller frequency in North West Africa, among the Maure and Bambara of Mali and Mauritania. (Rando et al. 1998; Maca-Meyer et al. 2003)

L2a1a is present in the United States population.

====== Haplogroup L2a1a1 ======
L2a1a1 is defined by markers 6152C, 15391T, and 16368C. It has been found in the United States as well as Brazil, Libya, Sierra Leone, Angola, Zambia, and other countries.

===== Haplogroup L2a1b =====
L2a1b is defined by substitutions at 16189 and 10143. 16192 is also common in L2a1b and L2a1c; it appears in North Africa in Egypt, It also appears in Southeastern Africa and so it may also be a marker for the Bantu expansion. the South African variant is mostly attributed to L2a1b1 being a branch of the L2a1b, it is found in South Africa, Mozambique, Kenya, and Kuwait.

===== Haplogroup L2a1c =====
L2a1c often shares mutation 16189 with L2a1b, but has its own markers at 3010 and 6663. 16192 is also common in L2a1b and L2a1c; it appears in Southeastern Africa as well as East Africa. This suggests some diversification of this clade in situ.

Positions T16209C C16301T C16354T on top of L2a1 define a small sub-clade, dubbed L2a1c by Kivisild et al. (2004, Figure 3) (see also Figure 6 in Salas et al. 2002), which mainly appears in East Africa (e.g. Sudan, Nubia, Ethiopia), among the Turkana and West Africa (e.g. Kanuri).

In the Chad Basin, four different L2a1c types one or two mutational steps from the East and West African types were identified. (Kivisild et al.) 2004. (citation on page.9 or 443)

L2a1c has been shown to be present in Chad, Gabon, Spain, and the United States.

====== Haplogroup L2a1c1 ======
L2a1c1 has a north African origin. It is defined by markers 198, 930, 3308, 8604, 16086. It is observed in Tunisians, Moroccans, Egyptians, Nubians, and Yemenis. Branches of L2a1c1 are present in Nigeria, Senegal, and Zambia.

Haplogroup L2a1c2

L2a1c2 is a branch of L2a1c1. Originating in north Africa, primarily observed in north African Jews and other north Africans. Branches also present in Latin America and West Africa, due to north African admixture.

===== Haplogroup L2a1d =====
L2a1d is defined by the mutations T5196C, T9530C, T11386C, A12612G, and C13934T. It has been found in the United Arab Emirates and Kuwait Also L2a1d is found in Benin.

====== Haplogroup L2a1d1 ======
L2a1d1 is an Eastern African branch that has been identified in populations in Somalia and Sudan. L2a1d1 has also been found in Ethiopia and Egypt.

====== Haplogroup L2a1d2 ======
L2a1d2 is associated with Sub-Saharan Africa, including southern Africa (Mozambique, Mbunda people and Bemba people in Zambia, Khoisan peoples including Tshwa San).

===== Haplogroup L2a1e =====
L2a1e is defined by the mutations C3495A, G8790A, and G12630A. It has been found in Brazil, Grenada, and among African Americans.

====== Haplogroup L2a1e1 ======
L2a1e1 has been found around the Americas in Brazil, Caribbean populations of West African descent (Jamaica, Dominica, and Barbados), and among African Americans.

===== Haplogroup L2a1f =====
L2a1f is observed in Bakongo descendants living in the United States and the Dominican Republic, Khosian people in South Africa, Oman, Zambia and Madagascar it has also been found in Burkina Faso and Oman as well as through the Americas.

===== Haplogroup L2a1g =====
L2a1g is defined by the mutations A8014G, C14281T, T16131C, C16225T, and C16234T. It is observed in southern Africa among Bantu speakers, including in Zambia, Madagascar, and South Africa.

===== Haplogroup L2a1h =====
L2a1h has been shown to be present in Israel and Kenya.

===== Haplogroup L2a1k =====
L2a1k is defined by markers G6722A and T12903C. Described as European-specific, it was previously called subclade L2a1a and has been detected in Czechs, Slovaks, Croatians, Serbs, and Bulgarians.

===== Haplogroup L2a1l =====
L2a1l is defined by the mutation C534T. It appears in Algeria, Sierra Leone (among Mende people), and The Gambia (among Wolof people) and was present in ancient Spain.

====== Haplogroup L2a1l1 ======
L2a1l1 is observed among the Nuna and Mossi peoples of Burkina Faso.

====== Haplogroup L2a1l2 ======
L2a1l2 is present in people in various parts of West Africa, North Africa, and western Europe, including Mandinka people from Guinea-Bissau, Fula people from The Gambia, and Pana people from Burkina Faso.

====== Haplogroup L2a1l2a ======
L2a1l2a is recognized as an "Ashkenazi-specific" haplogroup, seen amongst Ashkenazi Jews with ancestry in Central and Eastern Europe. It has also been detected in small numbers in ostensibly non-Jewish Polish populations, where it is presumed to have come from Ashkenazi admixture. However, this haplotype constitutes only a very small proportion of Ashkenazi mitochondrial lineages; various studies (including Behar's) have put its incidence at between 1.4 and 1.6%.

====== Haplogroup L2a1l3 ======
L2a1l3 is defined by the mutations G14905A and T16357C. It is found in Togo as well as in Yoruba people in Nigeria and in Algeria.

===== Haplogroup L2a1m =====
L2a1m is defined by the mutation A13884G. It has been found in Burkina Faso and as well as Oman, Yemen, Saudi Arabia and Israel.

====== Haplogroup L2a1m1 ======
L2a1m1 has been found among African Americans and Dominicans.

====== Haplogroup L2a1m1a ======
L2a1m1a has been found among African Americans and in Saint Vincent and the Grenadines.

===== Haplogroup L2a1n =====
L2a1n is observed among the Yoruba people of Nigeria and the Mossi people of Burkina Faso and has also been detected in Cameroon and Portugal on the Iberian Peninsula.

===== Haplogroup L2a1o =====
L2a1o is defined by the mutation T12438C. It has been detected in Syria and Burkina Faso.

===== Haplogroup L2a1p =====
L2a1p is defined by the mutations A9410G, T13818C, and C15626T. It is found in Nigeria, Kassena people in Burkina Faso, and Moroccan Jews. It is also present in the United States of America.

==== Haplogroup L2a2 ====
L2a2 is characteristic of the Mbuti Pygmies.

=== Haplogroup L2b'c ===
L2b'c probably evolved around 62,000 years ago.

==== Haplogroup L2b ====
This subclade is predominantly found in West Africa, but it is spread all over Africa. branches of L2b also include L2b1a1 which is found in Liguria Italy and L2b3 which is found in Galicia (Spain).

==== Haplogroup L2c ====
L2c is most frequent in West Africa, and may have arisen there. Specially present in Senegal at 39%, Cape Verde 16% and Guinea-Bissau 16%. Branches of L2c has also been known to be found in Europe in areas such as on the Iberian Peninsula in Andalusia Spain, Catalonia Spain and also in continental North Western Europe in the Netherlands.

=== Haplogroup L2d ===
L2d is most frequent in West Africa, where it may have arisen. It is also found in Yemen, Mozambique and Sudan.

=== Haplogroup L2e ===
L2e (former L2d2) is typical in West Africa. It is also found in Tunisia, and among Mandinka people from Guinea-Bissau and African Americans.

== Tree ==
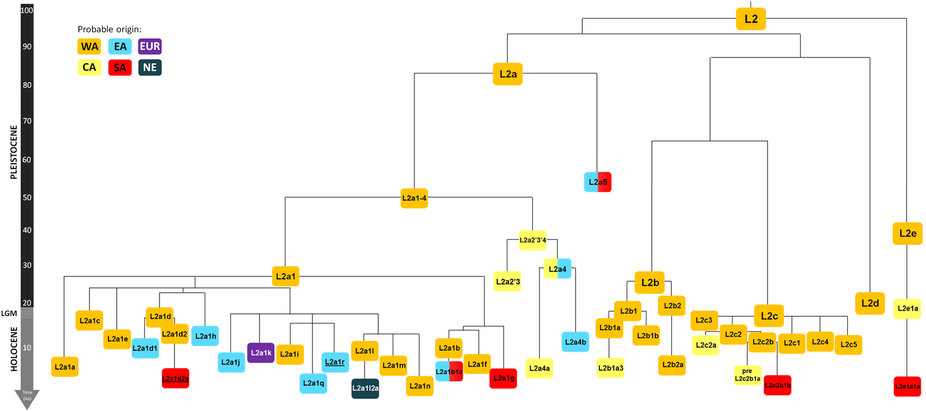
Phylogenetic tree of haplogroup L2 subclades. Numbers in the left side bar represents estimated time in thousand years ago. Colour scheme corresponding to the probable origin of each clade.

This phylogenetic tree of haplogroup L2 subclades is based on the paper by Mannis van Oven and Manfred Kayser Updated comprehensive phylogenetic tree of global human mitochondrial DNA variation and subsequent published research.

- Most Recent Common Ancestor (MRCA)
  - L1'2'3'4'5'6
    - L2'3'4'6
      - L2
        - L2a'b'c'd
          - L2a
            - L2a1
              - L2a1a
                - L2a1a1
                - L2a1a2
                  - L2a1a2a
                    - L2a1a2a1
                  - L2a1a2b
                - L2a1a3
              - 16189 (16192)
                - L2a1b
                  - L2a1b1
                - L2a1f
                  - L2a1f1
              - 143
                - L2a1c
                  - L2a1c1
                  - L2a1c2
                  - L2a1c3
                  - L2a1c4
                - L2a1d
                - L2a1e
                  - L2a1e1
                - L2a1h
                - 16189
                  - L2a1i
                  - L2a1j
                  - L2a1k
                  - 16192
                    - L2a1l
                      - L2a1l1
                        - L2a1l1a
                      - L2a1l2
            - L2a2
              - L2a2a
                - L2a2a1
              - L2a2b
                - L2a2b1
          - L2b'c
            - L2b
              - L2b1
                - L2b1a
                  - L2b1a2
                  - L2b1a3
            - L2c
              - L2c2
                - L2c2a
              - L2c3
          - L2d
            - L2d1
              - L2d1a
        - L2e

== See also ==
- Genealogical DNA test
- Genetic genealogy
- Human mitochondrial genetics
- Population genetics
- Human mitochondrial DNA haplogroups

Phylogenetic tree of human mitochondrial DNA (mtDNA) haplogroups

Mitochondrial Eve (L)

L0
L1–6

L1
L2

L3

L4
L5
L6
M
N

CZ
D
E
G
Q

O
A
S
R

I
W
X
Y
C
Z
B
F
R0

pre-JT

P

U
HV
JT
K
H
V
J
T
