= Haplogroup X (mtDNA) =

Human mitochondrial DNA haplogroup

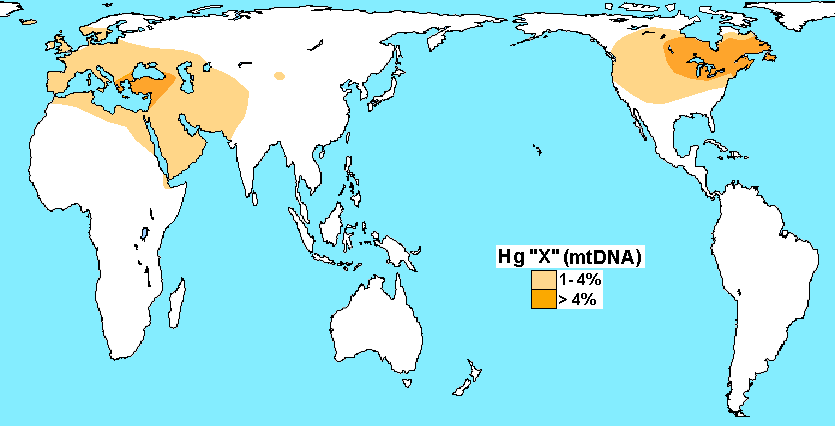
- Possible time of origin: ca. 31,800 years ago
- Possible place of origin: Middle East
- Ancestor: N
- Descendants: X1'2'3, X4
- Defining mutations: 73, 7028, 11719, 12705, 14766, 16189, 16223, 16278

Haplogroup X is a human mitochondrial DNA (mtDNA) haplogroup. It is found in North America, Europe, Western Asia, North Africa, and the Horn of Africa.

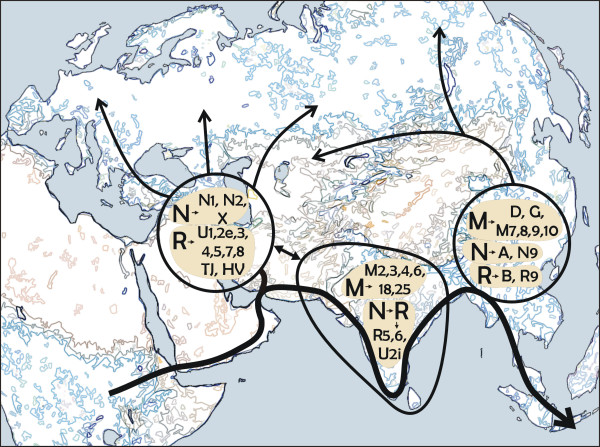
A mtDNA-based map of major human migrations.

Haplogroup X diverged from haplogroup N roughly 30,000 years ago (just prior to or during the Last Glacial Maximum). It is in turn ancestral to subclades X2 and X1, which arose c.16-21 thousand and c.14-24 thousand years ago, respectively.

== Distribution ==
Haplogroup X is found in approximately 2% of native Europeans, and 13% of all native North Americans. Additionally, the Haplogroup is present in around 3% of Assyrians, with high concentrations in Erzurum, Turkey as well. Notably, the haplogroup is especially common, at 14.3%, among the natives of Bahariya Oasis (Western Desert, Egypt. The X1 subclade is much less frequent, and is largely restricted to North Africa, the Horn of Africa and the Near East.

Subclade X2 appears to have undergone extensive population expansion and dispersal around or soon after the Last Glacial Maximum, roughly 20,000 years ago. It is more strongly represented in the Near East, the Caucasus, and southern Europe, and somewhat less strongly present in the rest of Europe. The highest concentrations are found in the Ojibwe (25%), Sioux (15%), Nuu-Chah-Nulth (12%), Georgia (8%), Orkney (7%), and amongst the Druze in Israel (27%). Subclades of X2 are not present in South American Amerindian populations. The oldest known human associated with X2 is Kennewick Man, whose c. 9000-year old remains were discovered in Washington State.

=== Archaeogenetics ===
Haplogroup X has been found in various other bone specimens that were analysed for ancient DNA, including specimens associated with the Alföld Linear Pottery (X2b-T226C, Garadna-Elkerülő út site 2, 1/1 or 100%), Linearbandkeramik (X2d1, Halberstadt-Sonntagsfeld, 1/22 or ~5%), and Iberia Chalcolithic (X2b, La Chabola de la Hechicera, 1/3 or 33%; X2b, El Sotillo, 1/3 or 33%; X2b, El Mirador Cave, 1/12 or ~8%) cultures. Abel-beth-maachah 2201 was a man who lived between 1014 and 836 BC during the Levant Iron Age and was found in the region now known as Abel Beth Maacah, Metula, Israel. He was associated with the Galilean cultural group. His direct maternal line belonged to mtDNA haplogroup X2b. Haplogroup X has been found in ancient Assyria and ancient Egyptian mummies excavated at the Abusir el-Meleq archaeological site in Middle Egypt, which date from the late New Kingdom and Roman periods. Fossils excavated at the Late Neolithic site of Kelif el Boroud in Morocco, which have been dated to around 5,000 years old, have also been found to carry the X2 subclade.

=== Druze ===
In Eurasia, the greatest frequency and variety of haplogroup X is observed in the Druze, a minority population in Israel, Jordan, Lebanon, and Syria, as much in X1 (16%) as in X2 (11%). The Druze also have much diversity of X lineages. This pattern of heterogeneous parental origins is consistent with Druze oral tradition. The Galilee Druze represent a population isolate, so their combination of a high frequency and diversity of X signifies a phylogenetic refugium, providing a sample snapshot of the genetic landscape of the Near East prior to the modern age.

=== North America ===
Haplogroup X is also one of the five haplogroups found in the indigenous peoples of the Americas. (namely, X2a subclade).

Although it occurs only at a frequency of about 3% for the total current indigenous population of the Americas, it is a bigger haplogroup in northern North America, where among the Algonquian peoples it comprises up to 25% of mtDNA types. It is also present in lesser percentages to the west and south of this area—among the Sioux (15%), the Nuu-chah-nulth (11%–13%), the Navajo (7%), and the Yakama (5%). In Latin America, Haplotype X6 was present in the Tarahumara 1.8% (1/53) and Huichol 20% (3/15) X6 and X7 was also found in 12% in Yanomani people.

Unlike the four main Native American mtDNA haplogroups (A, B, C, D), X is not strongly associated with East Asia. The main occurrence of X in Asia discovered so far is in the Altai people in Siberia.

One theory of how the X Haplogroup ended up in North America is that the people carrying it migrated from central Asia along with haplogroups A, B, C, and D, from an ancestor from the Altai Region of Central Asia. Two sequences of haplogroup X2 were sampled further east of Altai among the Evenks of Central Siberia. These two sequences belong to X2* and X2b. It is uncertain if they represent a remnant of the migration of X2 through Siberia or a more recent input.

This relative absence of haplogroup X2 in Asia was one of the major factors used to support the Solutrean hypothesis during the early 2000s. The Solutrean hypothesis postulates that haplogroup X reached North America with a wave of European migration emerging from the Solutrean culture, a stone-age culture in south-western France and in Spain, by boat around the southern edge of the Arctic ice pack roughly 20,000 years ago. Since the later 2000s and during the 2010s, evidence has turned against the Solutrean hypothesis, as no presence of mt-DNA ancestral to X2a has been found in Europe or the Near East. The New World X2a lineage is not derived from the Old World lineages such as X2b, X2c, X2d, X2e, and X2f, indicating an early origin of the New World lineage "likely at the very beginning of their expansion and spread from the Near East". A 2008 study came to the conclusion that the presence of haplogroup X in the Americas does not support migration from Solutrean-period Europe. The lineage of haplogroup X in the Americas is not derived from a European subclade, but rather represent an independent subclade, labelled X2a. The X2a subclade has not been found in Eurasia, and has most likely arisen within the early Paleo-Indian population, at roughly 13,000 years ago. A basal variant of X2a was found in the Kennewick Man fossil (ca. 9,000 years ago).

== Subclades ==
=== Tree ===
This phylogenetic tree of haplogroup X subclades is based on the paper by Mannis van Oven and Manfred Kayser Updated comprehensive phylogenetic tree of global human mitochondrial DNA variation and subsequent published research.

- X
  - X1'2'3
    - X1'3
      - X1
        - X1a
          - X1a1
        - X1b
        - X1c
          - X3
        - X3a
    - X2
      - X2-G225A
        - X2a'j
          - X2a
            - X2a1
              - X2a1a
                - X2a1a1
              - X2a1b
                - X2a1b1
                  - X2a1b1a
              - X2a1c
            - X2a2
          - X2j
        - X2b'd
          - X2b
            - X2b-T226C
              - X2b1
              - X2b2
              - X2b3
              - X2b4
                - X2b4a
                  - X2b4a1
              - X2b5
              - X2b6
                - X2b6a
              - X2b7
              - X2b8
              - X2b9
              - X2b10
                - X2b10a
              - X2b11
              - X2b-T226C-C16192T
                - X2b12
                - X2b13
          - X2d
            - X2d1
              - X2d1a
            - X2d2
        - X2c
          - X2c1
            - X2c1a
            - X2c1b
            - X2c1c
              - X2c1c1
            - X2c1d
            - X2c1e
          - X2c2
        - X2e
          - X2e1
            - X2e1a
              - X2e1a1
                - X2e1a1a
            - X2e1b
          - X2e2
            - X2e2a
              - X2e2a1
              - X2e2a2
            - X2e2b
              - X2e2b1
            - X2e2c
              - X2e2c1
        - X2-G225A-G153A!
          - X2g
          - X2l
        - X2-G225A-T16223C
          - X2h
        - X2i
          - X2i-A225G!
            - X2i1
        - X2m'n
          - X2m
            - X2m1
            - X2m2
          - X2n
        - X2o
          - X2o1
      - X2f
        - X2f1
      - X2g
      - X2h
      - X2k
      - X2p
        - X2p1
  - X4

== Notable members ==
- Abraham Lincoln carries haplogroup X1.
- Steven J. Heine carries haplogroup X2c1.

== See also ==
- Human mitochondrial DNA haplogroups
- Indigenous American genetic studies
- Kennewick Man
- The Seven Daughters of Eve

Phylogenetic tree of human mitochondrial DNA (mtDNA) haplogroups

Mitochondrial Eve (L)

L0
L1–6

L1
L2

L3

L4
L5
L6
M
N

CZ
D
E
G
Q

O
A
S
R

I
W
X
Y
C
Z
B
F
R0

pre-JT

P

U
HV
JT
K
H
V
J
T
