= Haplogroup N (mtDNA) =

Widespread human mitochondrial DNA grouping indicating common ancestry

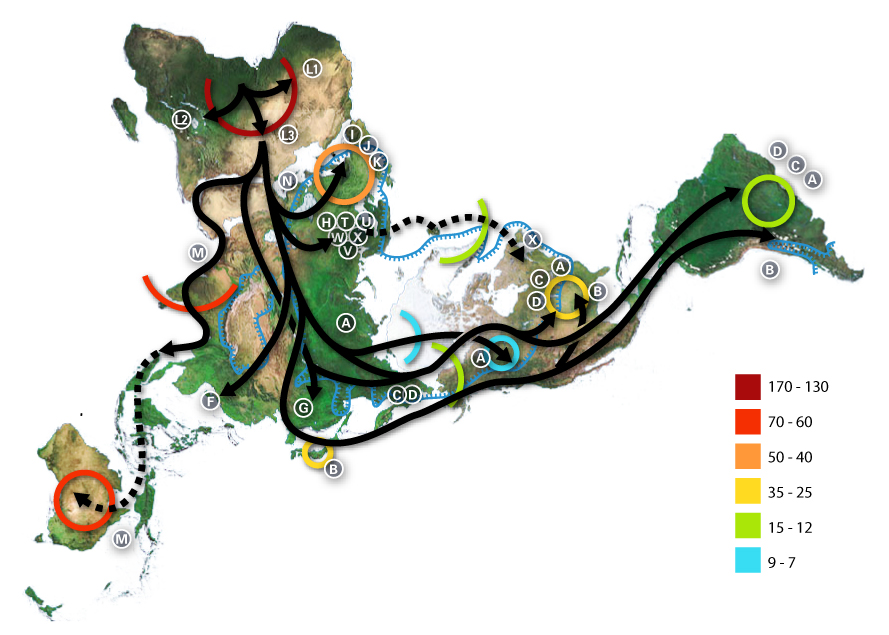
- Ancient dispersal of haplogroup L3, its descendant M and N lineages, and other mtDNA clades. Numbers represent thousand years before present.
- Possible time of origin: ~55-70,000 YBP or 50-65,000 YBP
- Possible place of origin: Asia or East Africa
- Ancestor: L3
- Descendants: N1'5, N2, N3, N7, N8, N9, N10, N11, N13, N14, N21, N22, A, O, S, X, R
- Defining mutations: 8701, 9540, 10398, 10873, 15301

Haplogroup N is a human mitochondrial DNA (mtDNA) clade. A macrohaplogroup, its descendant lineages are distributed across many continents. Like its sibling macrohaplogroup M, macrohaplogroup N is a descendant of the haplogroup L3.

All mtDNA haplogroups found outside of Africa are descendants of either haplogroup N or its sibling haplogroup M. M and N are the signature maternal haplogroups that define the theory of the recent African origin of modern humans and subsequent early human migrations around the world. The global distribution of haplogroups N and M indicates that there was likely at least one major prehistoric migration of humans out of Africa, with both N and M later evolving outside the continent.

== Origins ==
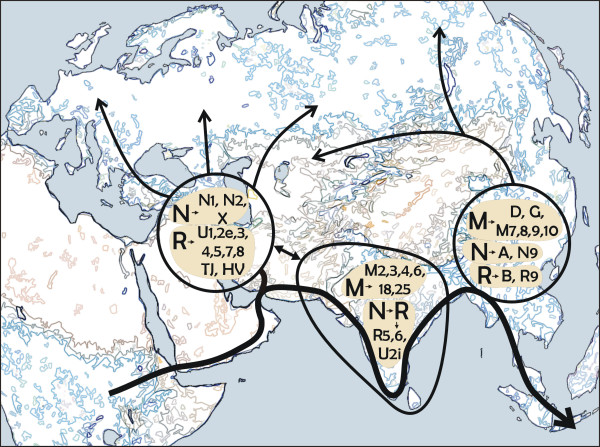
Suggested routes of the initial settlement of Europe based on mtDNA haplogroups M and N, Metspalu et al. 2004. A major population split near the Persian Gulf would explain the ubiquity of Haplogroup N and the absence of Haplogroup M in West Eurasia

There is widespread agreement in the scientific community concerning the African ancestry of haplogroup L3 (haplogroup N's parent clade). However, whether or not the mutations which define haplogroup N itself first occurred within Asia or Africa has been a subject for ongoing discussion and study.

The out of Africa hypothesis has gained generalized consensus. However, many specific questions remain unsettled. To know whether the two M and N macrohaplogroups that colonized Eurasia were already present in Africa before the exit is puzzling.

Torroni et al. 2006 state that Haplogroups M, N and R occurred somewhere between East Africa and the Persian Gulf.

Also related to the origins of haplogroup N is whether ancestral haplogroups M, N and R were part of the same migration out of Africa, or whether Haplogroup N left Africa via the Northern route through the Levant, and M left Africa via Horn of Africa. This theory was suggested because haplogroup N is by far the predominant haplogroup in Western Eurasia, and haplogroup M is absent in Western Eurasia, but is predominant in India and is common in regions East of India. However, the mitochondrial DNA variation in isolated "relict" populations in southeast Asia and among Indigenous Australians supports the view that there was only a single dispersal from Africa. Southeast Asian populations and Indigenous Australians all possess deep rooted clades of both haplogroups M and N. The distribution of the earliest branches within haplogroups M, N, and R across Eurasia and Oceania therefore supports a three-founder-mtDNA scenario and a single migration route out of Africa. These findings also highlight the importance of Indian subcontinent in the early genetic history of human settlement and expansion.

=== Asian origin hypothesis ===
The hypothesis of Asia as the place of origin of haplogroup N is supported by the following:

1. Haplogroup N is found in all parts of the world but has low frequencies in Sub-Saharan Africa. According to a number of studies, the presence of Haplogroup N in Africa is most likely the result of back migration from Eurasia.
2. The oldest clades of macrohaplogroup N are found in Asia and Australia.
3. It would be paradoxical that haplogroup N had traveled all the distance to Australia or New World yet failed to affect other populations within Africa besides North Africans and Horn Africans.
4. The mitochondrial DNA variation in isolated "relict" populations in southeast Asia supports the view that there was only a single dispersal from Africa. The distribution of the earliest branches within haplogroups M, N, and R across Eurasia and Oceania provides additional evidence for a three-founder-mtDNA scenario and a single migration route out of Africa. These findings also highlight the importance of Indian subcontinent in the early genetic history of human settlement and expansion. Therefore, N's history is similar to M and R which have their most probable origin in South Asia.

A study (Vai et al. 2019), finds a basal branch of maternal haplogroup N in early Neolithic North African remains from the Libyan site of Takarkori. The authors propose that N most likely split from L3 in the Arabian peninsula and later migrated back to North Africa, with its sister haplogroup M also likely splitting from L3 in the Middle East, but also suggest that N may have possibly diverged in North Africa, and state that more information is necessary to be certain.

=== African origin hypothesis ===
According to Toomas Kivisild "the lack of L3 lineages other than M and N in India and among non-African mitochondria in general suggests that the earliest migration(s) of modern humans already carried these two mtDNA ancestors, via a departure route over the Horn of Africa.

In 2019, a study by Vai et al. presented evidence of a basal branch of haplogroup N from the Neolithic Sahara. They suggest that N either diverged from haplogroup L3 in the Near East (possibly in the Arabian peninsula, following the exit of L3 from Africa), then back-migrated to North Africa, or that it instead may have originated in North Africa (having diverged from L3 there).

== Distribution ==
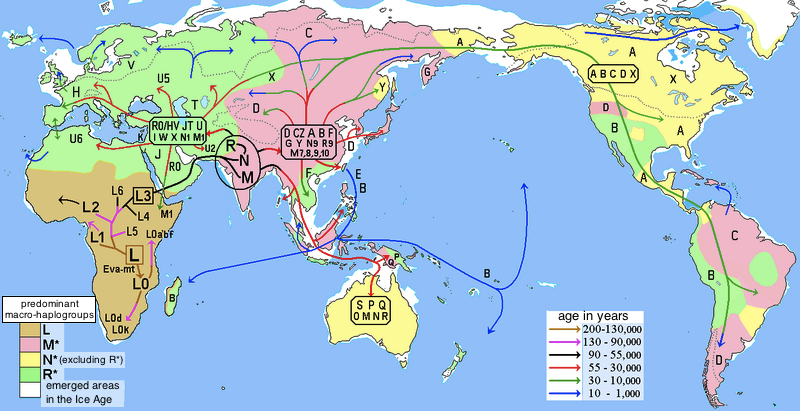
Dispersal route of Haplogroup N and its subgroups

Haplogroup N is derived from the ancestral L3 macrohaplogroup, which represents the migration discussed in the theory of the recent African origin of modern humans. Haplogroup N is the ancestral haplogroup to almost all clades today distributed in Europe and Oceania, as well as many found in Asia and the Americas. It is believed to have arisen at a similar time to haplogroup M.

=== Subgroups distribution ===
Haplogroup N's derived clades include the macro-haplogroup R and its descendants, and haplogroups A, I, S, W, X, and Y.

Rare unclassified haplogroup N* has been found among fossils belonging to the Cardial and Epicardial culture (Cardium pottery) and the Pre-Pottery Neolithic B. A rare unclassified form of N has been also been reported in modern Algeria.

- Haplogroup N1'5
  - Haplogroup N1 – found in Africa.
    - N1a'c'd'e'I
      - N1a'd'e'I
        - N1a'e'I
          - Haplogroup N1a – Arabian Peninsula and Northeast Africa. Found also in Central Asia and Southern Siberia. This branch is well attested in ancient people from various cultures of Neolithic Europe, from Hungary to Spain, and among the earliest farmers of Anatolia.
            - N1a1'2
              - N1a1
                - N1a1a
                  - N1a1a-T152C!
                    - N1a1a1
                      - N1a1a1a
                        - N1a1a1a1
                          - N1a1a1a1a
                        - N1a1a1a2
                        - N1a1a1a3
                      - N1a1a1b
                    - N1a1a2
                  - N1a1a3
                - N1a1b
                  - N1a1b1
                  - N1e'I
                    - Haplogroup N1e – found in Balochs, Burushos, and Buryats
                    - Haplogroup I – West Eurasia and South Asia.
              - N1a2
            - N1a3
              - N1a3a
                - N1a3a1
                  - N1a3a1a
                - N1a3a2
                - N1a3a3
        - N1d
      - N1c
    - Haplogroup N1b – found in Middle East, Egypt (Gurna), Caucasus and Europe.
      - N1b1
        - N1b1a
          - N1b1a1
          - N1b1a2
            - N1b1a2a
            - N1b1a2b
          - N1b1a3
          - N1b1a-G16129A!
            - N1b1a4
              - N1b1a4a
          - N1b1a5 – found in Portugal and Uzbekistan
          - N1b1a6
          - N1b1a-T195C!
            - N1b1a7
            - N1b1a8
              - N1b1a8a
              - N1b1a8b
        - N1b1b
          - N1b1b1 – found in Ashkenazi Jews and other populations, formerly called N1b2. It is believed to be of Middle Eastern origin, but over time became concentrated in Ashkenazi Jews
      - N1b2
  - Haplogroup N5 – found in India.
    - N5a
- Haplogroup N2
  - Haplogroup N2a – small clade found in West Europe.
    - N2a1
    - N2a2
  - Haplogroup W – found in Western Eurasia and South Asia
- Haplogroup N3 – all subgroups have so far only been found in Belarus
  - Haplogroup N3a
    - Haplogroup N3a1
  - Haplogroup N3b
- Haplogroup N7 – all subgroups have so far only been found in Cambodia
  - Haplogroup N7a
    - Haplogroup N7a1
    - Haplogroup N7a2
  - Haplogroup N7b
- Haplogroup N8 – found in China.
- Haplogroup N9 – found in Far East. [TMRCA 45,709.7 ± 7,931.5 ybp; CI=95%]
  - Haplogroup N9a [TMRCA 17,520.4 ± 4,389.8 ybp; CI=95%]
    - Haplogroup N9a-C16261T
      - Haplogroup N9a-C16261T* – Vietnam (Kinh)
      - Haplogroup N9a-A4129G-A4913G-T12354C-A12612G-C12636T-T16311C!!! – Tashkurgan (Kyrgyz)
      - Haplogroup N9a1'3 [TMRCA 15,007.4 ± 6,060.1 ybp; CI=95%]
        - Haplogroup N9a1 – Chinese (Hakka in Taiwan, etc.), She, Tu, Uyghur, Tuvan, Mongolia, Khamnigan, Korea, Japan [TMRCA 9,200 (95% CI 7,100 <-> 11,600) ybp]
          - Haplogroup N9a1a – Chinese (Sichuan, Zhanjiang, etc.) [TMRCA 7,300 (95% CI 3,800 <-> 12,800) ybp]
          - Haplogroup N9a1b – Kyrgyz (Tashkurgan)
          - Haplogroup N9a1c – Vietnam (Tay people), Thailand (Khon Mueang from Chiang Mai Province, Lao Isan from Loei Province)
        - Haplogroup N9a3 – China [TMRCA 11,500 (95% CI 7,500 <-> 16,800) ybp]
          - Haplogroup N9a3a – Japan, Korean (Seoul), Taiwan (incl. Paiwan), Thailand (Mon from Lopburi Province and Kanchanaburi Province), China, Uyghur, Kyrgyz (Tashkurgan), Kazakhstan, Buryat, Russia (Belgorod, Chechen Republic, etc.), Ukraine, Moldova, Belarus, Lithuania, Poland, Czech (West Bohemia), Hungary, Austria, Germany [TMRCA 8,280.9 ± 5,124.4 ybp; CI=95%]
      - Haplogroup N9a2'4'5'11 [TMRCA 15,305.4 ± 4,022.6 ybp; CI=95%]
        - Haplogroup N9a2 – Japan, Korea, China (Barghut in Hulunbuir, Uyghur, etc.) [TMRCA 10,700 (95% CI 8,200 <-> 13,800) ybp]
          - Haplogroup N9a2a – Japan, Korea, Uyghur [TMRCA 8,100 (95% CI 6,500 <-> 10,000) ybp]
            - Haplogroup N9a2a1 – Japan [TMRCA 4,200 (95% CI 1,850 <-> 8,400) ybp]
            - Haplogroup N9a2a2 – Japan, Korea, Volga-Ural region (Tatar) [TMRCA 5,700 (95% CI 3,500 <-> 8,900) ybp]
            - Haplogroup N9a2a3 – Japan, Hulun-Buir region (Barghut) [TMRCA 4,700 (95% CI 2,400 <-> 8,400) ybp]
            - Haplogroup N9a2a4 – Japan [TMRCA 2,800 (95% CI 600 <-> 7,900) ybp]
          - Haplogroup N9a2b – China
          - Haplogroup N9a2c [TMRCA 7,200 (95% CI 3,600 <-> 12,700) ybp]
            - Haplogroup N9a2c* – Japan
            - Haplogroup N9a2c1 – Japan, Korea, Uyghur [TMRCA 2,600 (95% CI 1,250 <-> 4,900) ybp]
          - Haplogroup N9a2d – Japan, Korea [TMRCA 5,200 (95% CI 1,800 <-> 12,000) ybp]
          - Haplogroup N9a2e – China
        - Haplogroup N9a4 – Malaysia [TMRCA 7,900 (95% CI 3,900 <-> 14,300) ybp]
          - Haplogroup N9a4a – Japan [TMRCA 4,400 (95% CI 1,500 <-> 10,200) ybp]
          - Haplogroup N9a4b [TMRCA 5,700 (95% CI 2,400 <-> 11,400) ybp]
            - Haplogroup N9a4b* – Japan
            - Haplogroup N9a4b1 – China (Minnan in Taiwan, etc.)
            - Haplogroup N9a4b2 – China
        - Haplogroup N9a5 [TMRCA 8,700 (95% CI 4,700 <-> 15,000) ybp]
          - Haplogroup N9a5* – Korea
          - Haplogroup N9a5a – Japan
          - Haplogroup N9a5b – Japan [TMRCA 5,300 (95% CI 1,150 <-> 15,300) ybp]
        - Haplogroup N9a11 – Taiwan (Hakka, Minnan), Laos (Lao from Luang Prabang)
      - Haplogroup N9a6 – Thailand (Phuan from Lopburi Province, Khon Mueang from Lamphun Province, Phutai from Sakon Nakhon Province, Lawa from Mae Hong Son Province, Soa from Sakon Nakhon Province), Vietnam, Sumatra [TMRCA 11,972.5 ± 5,491.7 ybp; CI=95%]
        - Haplogroup N9a6a – Cambodia (Khmer), Malaysia (Bidayuh, Jehai, Temuan, Kensiu), Sumatra, Sundanese
        - Haplogroup N9a6b – Malaysia (Seletar)
      - Haplogroup N9a7 – Japan
      - Haplogroup N9a8 – Japan, China, Buryat
      - Haplogroup N9a9 – Chelkans (Biyka, Turochak), Tubalar (North-East Altai), Kyrgyz (Kyrgyzstan), China, Ukraine (Vinnytsia Oblast), Romania (10th century AD Dobruja)
      - Haplogroup N9a10 – Thailand (Khon Mueang from Mae Hong Son Province, Chiang Mai Province, Lamphun Province, and Lampang Province, Shan from Mae Hong Son Province, Lao Isan from Loei Province, Black Tai from Kanchanaburi Province, Phuan from Sukhothai Province and Phichit Province, Mon from Kanchanaburi Province), Laos (Lao from Luang Prabang, Hmong), Vietnam (Tay Nung), China (incl. Han in Chongqing)
        - Haplogroup N9a10a – China, Taiwan (Ami)
          - Haplogroup N9a10a1 – Chinese (Suzhou)
          - Haplogroup N9a10a2 – Philippines (Ivatan), Taiwan (Ami)
            - Haplogroup N9a10a2a – Taiwan (Atayal, Tsou)
        - N9a10-T16311C!
          - Haplogroup N9a10b – China
      - Haplogroup N9a12 – Khon Mueang (Pai District)
  - Haplogroup N9b – Japan, Udegey, Nanai, Korea [TMRCA 14,885.6 ± 4,092.5 ybp; CI=95%]
    - Haplogroup N9b1 – Japan [TMRCA 11,859.3 ± 3,760.2 ybp; CI=95%]
      - Haplogroup N9b1a – Japan [TMRCA 10,645.2 ± 3,690.3 ybp; CI=95%]
      - Haplogroup N9b1b – Japan [TMRCA 2,746.5 ± 2,947.0 ybp; CI=95%]
      - Haplogroup N9b1c – Japan [TMRCA 6,987.8 ± 4,967.0 ybp; CI=95%]
        - Haplogroup N9b1c1 – Japan
    - Haplogroup N9b2 – Japan [TMRCA 13,369.7 ± 4,110.0 ybp; CI=95%]
      - Haplogroup N9b2a – Japan
    - Haplogroup N9b3 – Japan [TMRCA 7,629.8 ± 6,007.6 ybp; CI=95%]
    - Haplogroup N9b4 – Japan, Ulchi
  - Haplogroup Y – found especially among Nivkhs, Ulchs, Nanais, Negidals, Ainus, and the population of Nias Island, with a moderate frequency among other Tungusic peoples, Koreans, Mongols, Koryaks, Itelmens, Chinese, Japanese, Tajiks, Island Southeast Asians (including Taiwanese aborigines), and some Turkic peoples [TMRCA 24,576.4 ± 7,083.2 ybp; CI=95%]
    - Haplogroup Y1 – Korea, Taiwan (Minnan), Thailand (Iu Mien from Phayao Province), Poland, Slovakia, Czech Republic [TMRCA 14,689.5 ± 5,264.3 ybp; CI=95%]
      - Haplogroup Y1a – Nivkh, Ulchi, Hezhen, Udegey, Even, Zabaikal Buryat, Mongolian, Daur, Korea, Han, Tibet, Ukraine [TMRCA 7,467.5 ± 5,526.7 ybp; CI=95%]
        - Haplogroup Y1a1 – Uyghur, Kyrgyz, Yakut, Buryat, Hezhen, Udegey, Evenk (Taimyr), Ket, Slovakia, Romania, Hungary, Turkey
        - Haplogroup Y1a2 – Koryak, Even (Kamchatka)
      - Haplogroup Y1b – Volga Tatar [TMRCA 9,222.8 ± 4,967.0 ybp; CI=95%]
        - Haplogroup Y1b1 – Chinese (Han from Lanzhou, etc.), Japanese, Korea, Russia
      - Haplogroup Y1c - Korea (especially Jeju Island), Khamnigan, Uyghur, Canada
    - Haplogroup Y2 – Chinese, Japanese, Korean, Khamnigan, South Africa (Cape Coloured) [TMRCA 7,279.3 ± 2,894.5 ybp; CI=95%]
      - Haplogroup Y2a – Taiwan (Atayal, Saisiyat, Tsou), Philippines (Maranao), Brunei, Indonesia, Malaysia, Hawaii, USA (Hispanic), Spain, Ireland [TMRCA 4,929.5 ± 2,789.6 ybp; CI=95%]
        - Haplogroup Y2a1 - Philippines (Bugkalot, Ivatan, Surigaonon, Manobo, Mamanwa, etc.), Malaysia (Sabah, Acheh Malay from Kedah, Banjar from Perak), Indonesia (Besemah from Sumatra, Medan, Bangka, Mandar from Sulawesi, etc.)
          - Haplogroup Y2a1a - Philippines (Kankanaey, Ifugao), USA (Hispanic)
      - Haplogroup Y2b – Japan, South Korea, Buryat [TMRCA 1,741.8 ± 3,454.2 ybp; CI=95%]
- Haplogroup N10 – found in China (Han from Shanghai, Jiangsu, Fujian, Guangdong, and Yunnan, Hani and Yi from Yunnan, She from Guizhou, Uzbek from Xinjiang) and Southeast Asia (Thailand, Indonesia, Vietnam, Malaysia).
  - N10a
  - N10b
- Haplogroup N11 – Mainland China & Philippines: Han Chinese (Yunnan, Sichuan, and Hubei), Tibetan (Xizang), Dongxiang (Gansu), Oroqen (Inner Mongolia) and Mamanwa (Philippines).
  - N11a
    - N11a1
      - N11a1a – ethnicity unknown, Zhejiang (eastern China)
      - N11a1b – Uyghur, Xinjiang (western China)
    - N11a2 – ethnicity unknown, China
  - N11b – Mamanwa, Philippines
- Haplogroup N13 – Aboriginal Australians
- Haplogroup N14 – Aboriginal Australians
- Haplogroup N21 – Temuan, Semelai, Thailand, Khmer, ethnic Malays from Malaysia and Indonesia.
  - N21-T195C! - Thailand (Southern Thai, Phutai), Cambodia (Khmer from Kampong Thom)
    - N21a - Malaysia (Temuan)
      - N21a1 (N21a+T3552C) - Malaysia (Temuan, Semelai)
      - N21a2 (N21a+G11150A) - Cham, Indonesia (Semende from southern Sumatra), Thailand (Karen)
        - N21a2a (N21a2+A13716G) - Vietnam (Giarai)
      - N21a3 (N21a+T12189C) - Thailand (Tai Yuan)
    - N21+T195C!+A16182G
      - N21+T195C!+A16182G+T9325C - Myanmar (Burman), China (Mosuo), Thailand (Blang)
      - N21+T195C!+A16182G+G15043A - Myanmar (Burman), Thailand (Blang, Tai Yuan), Vietnam (Hà Nhì)
      - N21+T195C!+A16182G+G15217A - Thailand (Central Thai), Sri Lanka (Tamil)
      - N21+T195C!+A16182G+G4512A - Thailand (Bru)
    - N21+T195C!+T7220C - Thai
      - N21+T195C!+T7220C+T14153C - Myanmar (Burman), Thailand (Central Thai)
    - N21+T195C!+G16129A! - Cham, Vietnam (Giarai)
    - N21+T195C!+A731G - Cham
      - N21+T195C!+A731G+A6791T - Vietnam (Mnong)
- Haplogroup N22 – Southeast Asia, Bangladesh, India, Japan
  - N22a
- Haplogroup A – found in Central and East Asia, as well as among Native Americans.
- Haplogroup O or N12 - found among Indigenous Australians and the Floresians of Indonesia.
- Haplogroup S – extended among Aboriginal Australians.
- Haplogroup X – found most often in Western Eurasia, but also present in the Americas.
  - Haplogroup X1 – found primarily in North Africa as well as in some populations of the Levant, notably among the Druze
  - Haplogroup X2 – found in Western Eurasia, Siberia and among Native Americans
- Haplogroup R – a very extended and diversified macro-haplogroup.

== Subclades ==
=== Tree ===
This phylogenetic tree of haplogroup N subclades is based on the paper by Mannis van Oven and Manfred Kayser Updated comprehensive phylogenetic tree of global human mitochondrial DNA variation and subsequent published research.

- N
  - N1'5
    - N1
      - N1a'c'd'e'I
        - N1a'd'e'I
          - N1a'e'I
            - N1a
              - N1a1
                - N1a1a
            - N1e'I
              - I
              - N1e
          - N1d
        - N1c
      - N1b
        - N1b1
          - N1b1a
          - N1b1b
          - N1b1c
            - N1b1d
        - N1b2
    - N5
  - N2
    - N2a
    - W
  - N3
    - N3a
      - N3a1
    - N3b
  - N7
    - N7a
      - N7a1
      - N7a2
    - N7b
  - N8
  - N9
    - N9a
      - N9a1'3
        - N9a1
        - N9a3
      - N9a2'4'5
        - N9a2
          - N9a2a'b
            - N9a2a
            - N9a2b
          - N9a2c
          - N9a2d
        - N9a4
        - N9a5
      - N9a6
        - N9a6a
    - N9b
      - N9b1
        - N9b1a
        - N9b1b
        - N9b1c
          - N9b1c1
      - N9b2
      - N9b3
    - Y
  - N10
    - N10a
    - N10b
  - N11
    - N11a
      - N11a1
      - N11a2
    - N11b
  - N13
  - N14
  - N21
  - N22
  - A
  - O
    - O1
  - S
  - X
  - R

== See also ==
Phylogenetic tree of human mitochondrial DNA (mtDNA) haplogroups

Mitochondrial Eve (L)

L0
L1–6

L1
L2

L3

L4
L5
L6
M
N

CZ
D
E
G
Q

O
A
S
R

I
W
X
Y
C
Z
B
F
R0

pre-JT

P

U
HV
JT
K
H
V
J
T
