= Haplogroup I (mtDNA) =

Human mitochondrial DNA haplogroup

- Possible time of origin: 20.1 kya (Olivieri 2013)
- Possible place of origin: Middle East
- Ancestor: N1a1b (former N1e'I), (Olivieri 2013)
- Descendants: I1, I2'3, I4, I5, I6, I7 (Olivieri 2013)
- Defining mutations: T10034C, G16129A!, G16391A (Behar & Family Tree DNA 2012)

Haplogroup I is a human mitochondrial DNA (mtDNA) haplogroup. It is believed to have originated about 21,000 years ago, during the Last Glacial Maximum (LGM) period in West Asia (Olivieri 2013); Terreros 2011; Fernandes 2012). The haplogroup is unusual in that it is now widely distributed geographically, but is common in only a few small areas of East Africa, West Asia, and Europe. It is especially common among the El Molo and Rendille peoples of Kenya, various regions of Iran, the Lemko people of Slovakia, Poland and Ukraine, the island of Krk in Croatia, the department of Finistère in France and some parts of Scotland and Ireland.

== Origin ==
Haplogroup I is a descendant (subclade) of haplogroup N1a1b and sibling of haplogroup N1a1b1 (Olivieri 2013). It is believed to have arisen somewhere in West Asia between 17,263 and 24,451 years before present (BP) (Behar 2012b), with coalescence age of 20.1 thousand years ago (Olivieri 2013). Specifically, it has been suggested that its origin is in the Near East (Terreros 2011). It has diverged to at least seven distinct clades i.e. branches I1–I7, dated between 16–6.8 thousand years (Olivieri 2013). The hypothesis about its Near Eastern origin is based on the fact that all haplogroup I clades, especially those from Late Glacial period (I1, I4, I5, and I6), include mitogenomes from the Near East (Olivieri 2013). The age estimates and dispersal of some subclades (I1, I2'3, I5) are similar to those of major subclades of the mtDNA haplogroups J and T, indicating possible dispersal of the I haplogroup into Europe during the Late Glacial period (c. 18–12 kya) and postglacial period (c. 10–11 kya), several millennia before the European Neolithic period. Some subclades (I1a1, I2, I1c1, I3) show signs of the Neolithic diffusion of agriculture and pastoralism within Europe (Olivieri 2013).

It is noteworthy that, with the exception of its northern neighbor Azerbaijan, Iran is the only population in which haplogroup I exhibits polymorphic levels. Also, a contour plot based on the regional phylogeographic distribution of the I haplogroup exhibits frequency clines consistent with an Iranian cradle ... Moreover, when compared with other populations in the region, those from the Levant (Iraq, Syria and Palestine) and the Arabian Peninsula (Oman and UAE) exhibit significantly lower proportions of I individuals ... this haplogroup has been detected in European groups (Krk, a tiny island off the coast of Croatia (11.3%), and Lemko, an isolate from the Carpathian Highlands (11.3%)) at comparable frequencies to those observed in the North Iranian population. However, the higher frequencies of the haplogroup within Europe are found in geographical isolates and are likely the result of founder effects and/or drift ... it is plausible that the high levels of haplogroup I present in Iran may be the result of a localized enrichment through the action of genetic drift or may signal geographical proximity to the location of origin.

— Terreros 2011

A similar view puts more emphasis on the Persian Gulf region of the Near East (Fernandes 2012).

Haplogroup I ... dates to ~25 ka ago and is overall most frequent in Europe ..., but the facts that it has a frequency peak in the Gulf region and that its highest diversity values are in the Gulf, Anatolia, and southeast Europe suggest that its origin is most likely in the Near East and/or Arabia ...

— Fernandes 2012

== Distribution ==
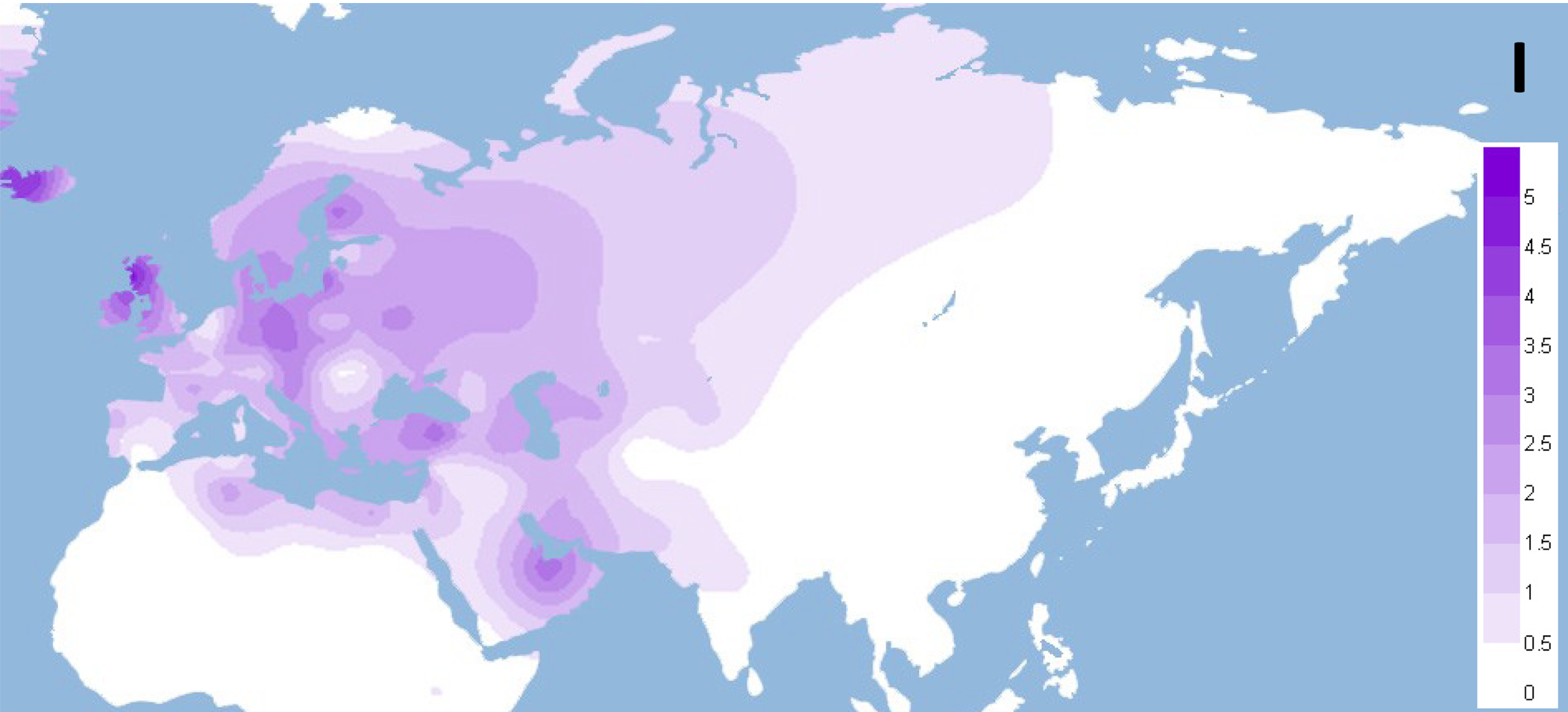
Projected frequencies of mtDNA haplogroup I

Haplogroup I is found at moderate to low frequencies in East Africa, Europe, West Asia and South Asia (Fernandes 2012). In addition to the confirmed seven clades, the rare basal/paraphyletic clade I* has been observed in three individuals; two from Somalia and one from Iran (Olivieri 2013).

=== Africa ===
The highest frequencies of mitochondrial haplogroup I observed so far appear in the Cushitic-speaking El Molo (23%) and Rendille (>17%) in northern Kenya (Castrì 2008). The clade is also found at comparable frequencies among Soqotrans (~22%).

Population	Location	Language Family	N	Frequency	Source
Amhara	Ethiopia	Afro-Asiatic > Semitic	1/120	0.83%	Kivisild 2004
Egyptians	Egypt	Afro-Asiatic > Semitic	2/34	5.9%	Stevanovitch 2004
Beta Israel	Ethiopia	Afro-Asiatic > Cushitic	0/29	0.00%	Behar 2008a
Dawro Konta	Ethiopia	Afro-Asiatic > Omotic	0/137	0.00%	Castrì 2008 and Boattini 2013
Ethiopia	Ethiopia	Undetermined	0/77	0.00%	Soares 2011
Ethiopian Jews	Ethiopia	Afro-Asiatic > Cushitic	0/41	0.00%	Non 2011
Gurage	Ethiopia	Afro-Asiatic > Semitic	1/21	4.76%	Kivisild 2004
Hamer	Ethiopia	Afro-Asiatic > Omotic	0/11	0.00%	Castrì 2008 and Boattini 2013
Ongota	Ethiopia	Afro-Asiatic > Cushitic	0/19	0.00%	Castrì 2008 and Boattini 2013
Oromo	Ethiopia	Afro-Asiatic > Cushitic	0/33	0.00%	Kivisild 2004
Tigrai	Ethiopia	Afro-Asiatic > Semitic	0/44	0.00%	Kivisild 2004
Daasanach	Kenya	Afro-Asiatic > Cushitic	0/49	0.00%	Poloni 2009
Elmolo	Kenya	Afro-Asiatic > Cushitic	12/52	23.08%	Castrì 2008 and Boattini 2013
Luo	Kenya	Nilo-Saharan	0/49	0.00%	Castrì 2008 and Boattini 2013
Maasai	Kenya	Nilo-Saharan	0/81	0.00%	Castrì 2008 and Boattini 2013
Nairobi	Kenya	Niger-Congo	0/100	0.00%	Brandstatter 2004
Nyangatom	Kenya	Nilo-Saharan	1/112	0.89%	Poloni 2009
Rendille	Kenya	Afro-Asiatic > Cushitic	3/17	17.65%	Castrì 2008 and Boattini 2013
Samburu	Kenya	Nilo-Saharan	3/35	8.57%	Castrì 2008 and Boattini 2013
Turkana	Kenya	Nilo-Saharan	0/51	0.00%	Castrì 2008 and Boattini 2013
Hutu	Rwanda	Niger-Congo	0/42	0.00%	Castrì 2009
Dinka	Sudan	Nilo-Saharan	0/46	0.00%	Krings 1999
Sudan	Sudan	Undetermined	0/102	0.00%	Soares 2011
Burunge	Tanzania	Afro-Asiatic > Cushitic	1/38	2.63%	Tishkoff 2007
Datoga	Tanzania	Nilo-Saharan	0/57	0.00%	Tishkoff 2007 and Knight 2003
Iraqw	Tanzania	Afro-Asiatic > Cushitic	0/12	0.00%	Knight 2003
Sukuma	Tanzania	Niger-Congo	0/32	0.00%	Tishkoff 2007 and Knight 2003
Turu	Tanzania	Niger-Congo	0/29	0.00%	Tishkoff 2007
Yemeni	Yemen	Afro-Asiatic > Semitic	0/114	0.00%	Kivisild 2004

=== Asia ===
Haplogroup I is present across West Asia, and is also found at lower frequencies in Central Asia and South Asia. Its highest frequency area is perhaps in northern Iran (9.7%). Terreros 2011 notes that it also has high diversity there and reiterates past studies that have suggested that this may be its place of origin. Found in Svan population from Georgia(Caucasus) I* 4.2%."Sequence polymorphisms of the mtDNA control region in a human isolate: the Georgians from Swanetia."Alfonso-Sánchez MA1, Martínez-Bouzas C, Castro A, Peña JA, Fernández-Fernández I, Herrera RJ, de Pancorbo MM. The table below shows some of the populations where it has been detected.

Population	Language Family	N	Frequency	Source
Baluch	Indo-European	0/39	0.00%	Quintana-Murci 2004
Brahui	Dravidian	0/38	0.00%	Quintana-Murci 2004
Caucasus (Georgia)*	Kartvelian	1/58	1.80%	Quintana-Murci 2004
Druze	–	11/311	3.54%	Shlush 2008
Gilaki	Indo-European	0/37	0.00%	Quintana-Murci 2004
Gujarati	Indo-European	0/34	0.00%	Quintana-Murci 2004
Hazara	Indo-European	0/23	0.00%	Quintana-Murci 2004
Hunza Burusho	Isolate	2/44	4.50%	Quintana-Murci 2004
India	–	8/2544	0.30%	Metspalu 2004
Iran (North)	–	3/31	9.70%	Terreros 2011
Iran (South)	–	2/117	1.70%	Terreros 2011
Kalash	Indo-European	0/44	0.00%	Quintana-Murci 2004
Kurdish (Western Iran)	Indo-European	1/20	5.00%	Quintana-Murci 2004
Kurdish (Turkmenistan)	Indo-European	1/32	3.10%	Quintana-Murci 2004
Lur	Indo-European	0/17	0.00%	Quintana-Murci 2004
Makrani	Indo-European	0/33	0.00%	Quintana-Murci 2004
Mazandarian	Indo-European	1/21	4.80%	Quintana-Murci 2004
Pakistani	Indo-European	0/100	0.00%	Quintana-Murci 2004
Pakistan	–	1/145	0.69%	Metspalu 2004
Parsi	Indo-European	0/44	0.00%	Quintana-Murci 2004
Pathan	Indo-European	1/44	2.30%	Quintana-Murci 2004
Persian	Indo-European	1/42	2.40%	Quintana-Murci 2004
Shugnan	Indo-European	1/44	2.30%	Quintana-Murci 2004
Sindhi	Indo-European	1/23	8.70%	Quintana-Murci 2004
Turkish (Azerbaijan)	Turkic	2/40	5.00%	Quintana-Murci 2004
Turkish (Anatolia)*	Turkic	1/50	2.00%	Quintana-Murci 2004
Turkmen	Turkic	0/41	0.00%	Quintana-Murci 2004
Uzbek	Turkic	0/42	0.00%	Quintana-Murci 2004

=== Europe ===
==== Eastern Europe ====
In Eastern Europe, the frequency of haplogroup I is generally lower than in Western Europe (1 to 3 percent), but its frequency is more consistent between populations with fewer places of extreme highs or lows. There are two notable exceptions. Nikitin 2009 found that Lemkos (a sub- or co-ethnic group of Rusyns) in the Carpathian Mountains have the "highest frequency of haplogroup I (11.3%) in Europe, identical to that of the population of Krk Island (Croatia) in the Adriatic Sea". (Note: Nikitin 2009: 6/53 in Lemkos "Lemkos shared the highest frequency of haplogroup I ever reported and the highest frequency of haplogroup M* in the region.") (Note: Cvjetan 2004: 15/133)

Population	N	Frequency	Source
Boyko	0/20	0.00%	Nikitin 2009
Hutsul	0/38	0.00%	Nikitin 2009
Lemko	6/53	11.32%	Nikitin 2009
Belorussians	2/92	2.17%	Belyaeva 2003
Russia (European)	3/215	1.40%	Helgason 2001
Romanians (Constanta)	59	0.00%	Bosch 2006
Romanians (Ploiesti)	46	2.17%	Bosch 2006
Russia	1/50	2.0%	Malyarchuk 2001
Ukraine	0/18	0.00%	Malyarchuk 2001
Croatia (Mainland)	4/277	1.44%	Pericić 2005
Croatia (Krk)	15/133	11.28%	Cvjetan 2004
Croatia (Brač)	1/105	0.95%	Cvjetan 2004
Croatia (Hvar)	2/108	1.9%	Cvjetan 2004
Croatia (Korčula)	1/98	1%	Cvjetan 2004
Herzegovinians	1/130	0.8%	Cvjetan 2004
Bosnians	6/247	2.4%	Cvjetan 2004
Serbians	4/117	3.4%	Cvjetan 2004
Macedonians	2/146	1.4%	Cvjetan 2004
Macedonian Romani	7/153	4.6%	Cvjetan 2004
Slovenians	2/104	1.92%	Malyarchuk 2003
Bosnians	4/144	2.78%	Malyarchuk 2003
Poles	8/436	1.83%	Malyarchuk 2003
Caucasus (Georgia)*	1/58	1.80%	Quintana-Murci 2004
Russians	5/201	2.49%	Malyarchuk 2003
Bulgaria/Turkey	2/102	1.96%	Helgason 2001

==== Western Europe ====
In Western Europe, haplogroup I is most common in Northwestern Europe (Norway, the Isle of Skye, and the British Isles). The frequency in these areas is between 2 and 5 percent. Its highest frequency in Brittany, France where it is over 9 percent of the population in Finistère. It is uncommon and sometimes absent in other parts of Western Europe (Iberia, South-West France, and parts of Italy).

Population	Language	N	Frequency	Source
Austria/Switzerland	–	4/187	2.14%	Helgason 2001
Basque (Admix Zone)	Basque/Labourdin côtier-haut navarrais	0/56	0.00%	Martınez-Cruz 2012
Basque (Araba)	Basque/Occidental	0/55	0.00%	Martınez-Cruz 2012
Basque (Bizkaia)	Basque/Biscayen	1/59	1.69%	Martınez-Cruz 2012
Basque (Central/Western Navarre )	Basque/Haut-navarrais méridional	2/63	3.17%	Martınez-Cruz 2012
Basque (Gipuskoa)	Basque/Gipuzkoan	0/57	0.00%	Martınez-Cruz 2012
Basque (Navarre Labourdin)	Basque/Bas-navarrais	0/68	0.00%	Martınez-Cruz 2012
Basque (North/Western Navarre)	Basque/Haut-navarrais septentrional	0/51	0.00%	Martınez-Cruz 2012
Basque (Roncal)	Basque/Roncalais-salazarais	0/55	0.00%	Martınez-Cruz 2012
Basque (Soule)	Basque/Souletin	0/62	0.00%	Martınez-Cruz 2012
Basque (South/Western Gipuskoa)	Basque/Biscayen	0/64	0.00%	Martınez-Cruz 2012
Béarn	French	0/51	0.00%	Martınez-Cruz 2012
Bigorre	French	0/44	0.00%	Martınez-Cruz 2012
Burgos	Spanish	0/25	0.00%	Martınez-Cruz 2012
Cantabria	Spanish	0/18	0.00%	Martınez-Cruz 2012
Chalosse	French	0/58	0.00%	Martınez-Cruz 2012
Denmark	–	6/105	5.71%	Mikkelsen 2010
England/Wales	–	12/429	3.03%	Helgason 2001
Finland	–	1/49	2.04%	Torroni 1996
Finland/Estonia	–	5/202	2.48%	Helgason 2001
France (Finistère)	–	2/22	9.10%	Dubut 2003
France (Morbihan)	–	0/40	0.00%	Dubut 2003
France (Normandy)	–	0/39	0.00%	Dubut 2003
France (Périgord-Limousin)	-	2/72	2.80%	Dubut 2003
France (Var)	–	2/37	5.40%	Dubut 2003
France/Italy	–	2/248	0.81%	Helgason 2001
Germany	–	12/527	2.28%	Helgason 2001
Gran Canaria	-	6/214	2.80%	García-Olivares 2023
Iceland	–	21/467	4.71%	Helgason 2001
Ireland	–	3/128	2.34%	Helgason 2001
Italy (Tuscany)	–	2/48	4.20%	Torroni 1996
La Rioja	Spanish	1/51	1.96%	Martınez-Cruz 2012
North Aragon	Spanish	0/26	0.00%	Martınez-Cruz 2012
Orkney	–	5/152	3.29%	Helgason 2001
Saami	–	0/176	0.00%	Helgason 2001
Scandinavia	–	12/645	1.86%	Helgason 2001
Scotland	–	39/891	4.38%	Helgason 2001
Spain/Portugal	–	2/352	0.57%	Helgason 2001
Sweden	–	0/37	0.00%	Torroni 1996
Western Bizkaia	Spanish	0/18	0.00%	Martınez-Cruz 2012
Western Isles/Isle of Skye	–	15/246	6.50%	Helgason 2001

=== Historic and prehistoric samples ===
Haplogroup I has until recently been absent from ancient European samples found in Paleolithic and Mesolithic grave sites. In 2017, in a site on Italian island of Sardinia was found a sample with the subclade I3 dated to 9124–7851 BC (Modi 2017), while in the Near East, in Levant was found a sample with yet-not-defined subclade dated 8850–8750 BC, while in Iran was found a younger sample with subclade I1c dated to 3972–3800 BC (Lazaridis 2016). In Neolithic Spain (c. 6090–5960 BC in Paternanbidea, Navarre) was found a sample with yet-not-defined subclade (Olivieri 2013). Haplogroup I displays a strong connection with the Indo-European migrations; especially its I1, I1a1 and I3a subclades, which have been found in Poltavka and Srubnaya cultures in Russia (Mathieson 2015), among ancient Scythians (Der Sarkissian 2011), and in Corded Ware and Unetice Culture burials in Saxony (Brandt 2013).I3a has also been found in the Unetice Culture in Lubingine, Germany 2,200 B.C. to 1,800 B.C. courtesy article on Unetice Culture Wikipedia of 2 Skeletons that were DNA tested. Haplogroup I (with undetermined subclades) has also been noted at significant frequencies in more recent historic grave sites (Melchior 2008 and Hofreiter 2010).

In 2013, Nature announced the publication of the first genetic study utilizing next-generation sequencing to ascertain the ancestral lineage of an Ancient Egyptian individual. The research was led by Carsten Pusch of the University of Tübingen in Germany and Rabab Khairat, who released their findings in the Journal of Applied Genetics. DNA was extracted from the heads of five Egyptian mummies that were housed at the institution. All the specimens were dated to between 806 BC and 124 AD, a time frame corresponding with the Late Dynastic and Ptolemaic periods. The researchers observed that one of the mummified individuals likely belonged to the I2 subclade. Haplogroup I has also been found among ancient Egyptian mummies excavated at the Abusir el-Meleq archaeological site in Middle Egypt, which date from the Pre-Ptolemaic/late New Kingdom, Ptolemaic, and Roman periods.

Haplogroup I5 has also been observed among specimens at the mainland cemetery in Kulubnarti, Sudan, which date from the Early Christian period (AD 550–800).

==== Samples with determined subclades ====
Culture	Country	Site	Date	Haplogroup	Source
Unetice	Germany	Esperstedt	2050–1800 BC	I1	Adler 2012; Brandt 2013
Bell Beaker	Germany	—	2600–2500 BC	I1a1	Lee 2012; Oliveiri 2013
Unetice	Germany	Plotzkau 3	2200–1550 BC	I1a1	Brandt 2013
Unetice	Germany	Eulau	1979–1921 BC	I1a1	Brandt 2013
Srubnaya	Russia	Rozhdestveno I, Samara Steppes, Samara	1850–1600 BC	I1a1	Mathieson 2015
Seh Gabi	Iran	—	3972–3800 BC	I1c	Lazaridis 2016
Cami de Can Grau	Spain	—	3500–3000 BC	I1c1	Sampietro 2007; Olivieri 2013
Late Dynastic-Ptolemaic	Egypt	—	806 BC – 124 AD	I2	Khairat 2013
Su Carroppu	Italy	—	9124–7851 BC	I3	Modi 2017
Scythian	Russia	Rostov-on-Don	500–200 BC	I3	Der Sarkissian 2011
Unetice	Germany	Benzingerode-Heimburg	1653–1627 BC	I3a	Brandt 2013
Unetice	Germany	Esperstedt	2131–1979 BC	I3a	Adler 2012; Brandt 2013; Haak 2015; Mathieson 2015
Unetice	Germany	Esperstedt	2199–2064 BC	I3a	Adler 2012; Brandt 2013; Haak 2015
Poltavka	Russia	Lopatino II, Sok River, Samara	2885–2665 BC	I3a	Mathieson 2015
Karasuk	Russia	Sabinka 2	1416–1268 BC	I4a1	Allentoft 2015
Minoan	Greece	Ayios Charalambos	2400–1700 BC	I5	Hughey 2013
Minoan	Greece	Ayios Charalambos	2400–1700 BC	I5	Hughey 2013
Minoan	Greece	Ayios Charalambos	2400–1700 BC	I5	Hughey 2013
Christian Nubia	Sudan	Kulubnarti	550–800 AD	I5	Sirak 2016
Late Bronze Age	Armenia	Norabak	1209–1009 BC	I5c	Allentoft 2015
Mezhovskava	Russia	Kapova cave	1598–1398 BC	I5c	Allentoft 2015

==== Samples with unknown subclades ====
Populations	N	Frequency	Source
Roman Iron Age sites Bøgebjerggård (AD 1–400); Simonsborg (AD 1–200); Skovgaarde (AD 200–400)	3/24	12.5%	Melchior 2008a, Hofreiter 2010
Viking Age burial sites Galgedil (AD 1000); Christian cemetery Kongemarken (AD 1000–1250) medieval cemetery Riisby (AD 1250–1450)	4/29	13.79%	Melchior 2008, Hofreiter 2010
Anglo-Saxon burial sites Leicester:6; Lavington:6; Buckland:7; Norton:12; Norwich:17	1/48	2.08%	Töpf 2006

We have previously observed a high frequency of Hg I's among Iron Age villagers (Bøgebjerggård) and individuals from the early Christian cemetery, Kongemarken [16], [17]. This trend was also found for the additional sites reported here, Simonsborg, Galgedil and Riisby. The overall frequency of Hg I among the individuals from the Iron Age to the Medieval Age is 13% (7/53) compared to 2.5% for modern Danes [35]. The higher frequencies of Hg I can not be ascribed to maternal kinship since only two individuals share the same common motif (K2 and K7 at Kongemarken). Except for Skovgaarde (no Hg I's observed) frequencies range between 9% and 29% and there seems to be no trend in relation to time. No Hg I's were observed at the Neolithic Damsbo and the Bronze Age site Bredtoftegård, where all three individuals harbored Hg U4 or Hg U5a (Table 1).

— Hofreiter 2010

The frequency of haplogroup I may have undergone a reduction in Europe following the Middle Ages. An overall frequency of 13% was found in ancient Danish samples from the Iron Age to the Medieval Age (including Vikings) from Denmark and Scandinavia compared to only 2.5% in modern samples. As haplogroup I is not observed in any ancient Italian, Spanish [contradicted by the recent research as have been found in pre-Neolithic Italy as well Neolithic Spain], British, central European populations, early central European farmers and Neolithic samples, according to the authors "Haplogroup I could, therefore, have been an ancient Southern Scandinavian type "diluted" by later immigration events" (Hofreiter 2010).

== Subclades ==
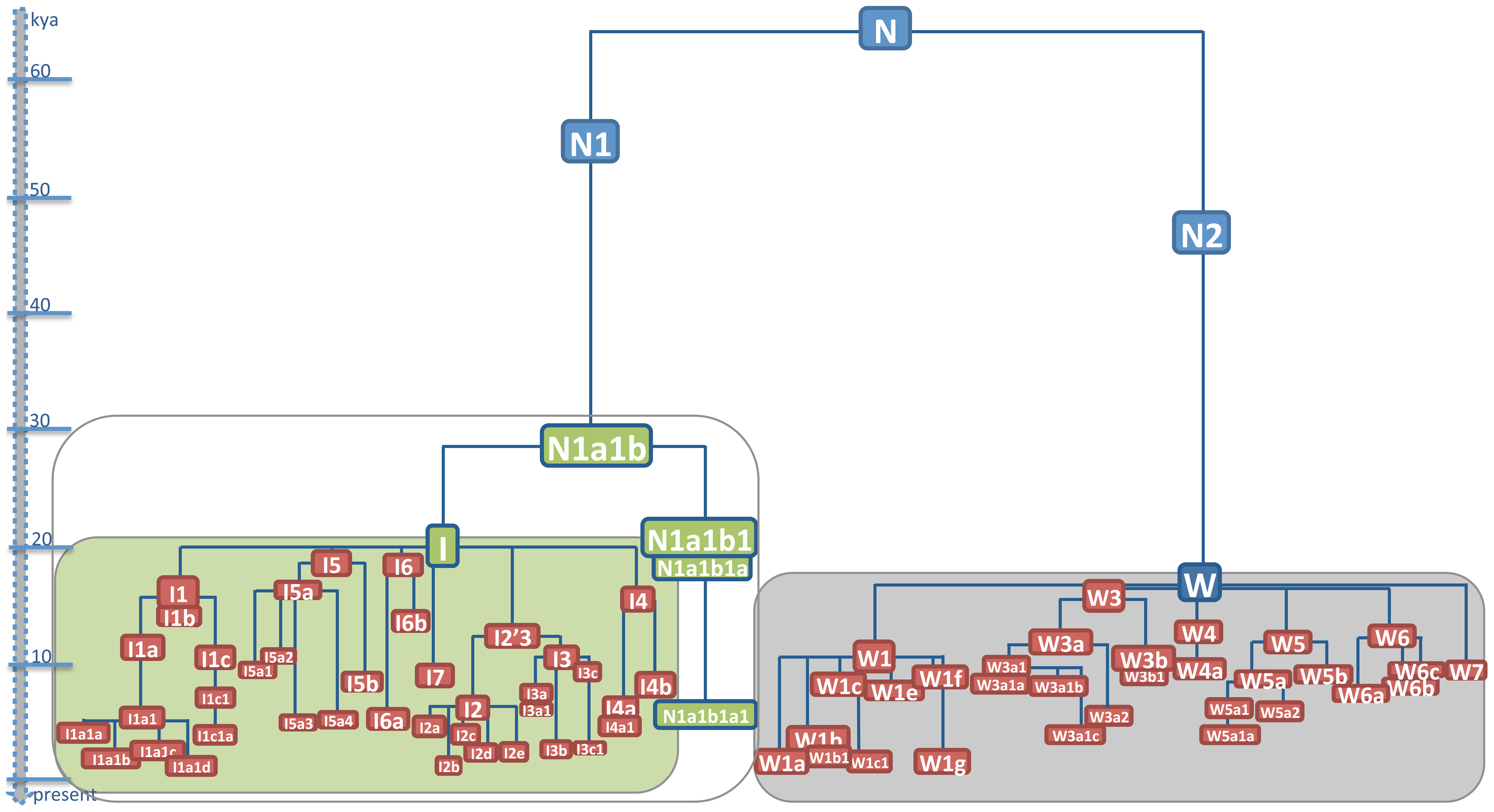
Phylogenetic tree of haplogroups I (left) and W (right). Kya in the left scale bar stands for thousand years ago (Olivieri 2013).

=== Tree ===
This phylogenetic tree of haplogroup I subclades with time estimates is based on the paper and published research (Olivieri 2013).

Hg (July 2013)	Age estimate (thousand years)	95% confidence interval (thousand years)
N1a1b	28.6	23.5–33.9
I	20.1	18.4–21.9
I1	16.3	14.6–18.0
I1a	11.6	9.9–13.3
I1a1	4.9	4.2–5.6
I1a1a	3.8	3.3–4.4
I1a1b	1.4	0.5–2.2
I1a1c	2.5	1.3–3.7
I1a1d	1.8	1.0–2.6
I1b	13.4	11.3–15.5
I1c	10.3	8.4–12.2
I1c1	7.2	5.4–9.0
I1c1a	4.0	2.5–5.4
I2'3	12.6	10.4–14.7
I2	6.8	6.0–7.6
I2a	4.7	3.8–5.7
I2a1	3.2	2.1–4.4
I2b	1.7	0.5–2.9
I2c	4.7	3.6–5.8
I2d	3.0	1.1–4.8
I2e	3.1	1.4–4.8
I3	10.6	8.8–12.4
I3a	7.4	6.1–8.7
I3a1	6.1	4.7–7.5
I3b	2.6	1.1–4.2
I3c	9.4	7.6–11.2
I4	15.1	12.3–18.0
I4a	6.4	5.4–7.4
I4a1	5.7	4.5–6.7
I4b	8.4	5.8–10.9
I5	18.4	16.4–20.3
I5a	16.0	14.0–17.9
I5a1	9.2	7.1–11.3
I5a2	12.3	10.2–14.4
I5a2a	1.6	1.0–2.1
I5a3	4.8	2.8–6.8
I5a4	5.6	3.5–7.8
I5b	8.8	6.3–11.2
I6	18.4	16.2–20.6
I6a	5.3	3.5–7.0
I6b	13.1	10.4–15.8
I7	9.1	6.3–11.9

=== Distribution ===
==== I1 ====
Haplogroup I1
- Possible time of origin: 15,231 ± 3,402 BP (Behar 2012b)
- Possible place of origin: Insufficient Data
- Ancestor: I
- Defining mutations: 455.1T, G6734A, G9966A, T16311C! (Behar & Family Tree DNA 2012)

It formed during the Last Glacial pre-warming period. It is found mainly in Europe, Near East, occasionally in North Africa and the Caucasus. It is the most frequent clade of the haplogroup (Olivieri 2013).

Genbank ID	Population	Source
JQ702472		Behar 2012b
JQ702567	Germany	Behar 2012b
JQ704077	Germany	Behar 2012b
JQ705840		Behar 2012b
KY022422	Iran	FamilyTreeDNA
MG191350	Spanish	FamilyTreeDNA
MG646219	Poland	Piotrowska-Nowak 2019b
MK294405	Swedish	FamilyTreeDNA
MN586593	Germany	FamilyTreeDNA
MW600776	Russian	FamilyTreeDNA

===== I1a =====
Haplogroup I1a
- Possible time of origin: 11,726 ± 3,306 BP (Behar 2012b)
- Possible place of origin: Insufficient Data
- Ancestor: I1
- Defining mutations: T152C!, G207A (Behar & Family Tree DNA 2012)

The subclade frequency peaks (circa 2.8%) are mostly located in North-Eastern Europe (Olivieri 2013).

Genbank ID	Population	Source
EU694173	–	FamilyTreeDNA
HM454265	Turkey (Armenian)	FamilyTreeDNA
JQ245746	Chuvash	Fernandes 2012
KC911435	Iran	Derenko 2013
KC911577	Iran	Derenko 2013
MK217219	Assyrians	Shamoon-Pour 2019
OQ982011	Italy	FamilyTreeDNA
PV621706	Morocco	Colombo 2025

====== I1a1 ======
Haplogroup I1a1
- Possible time of origin: 5,294 ± 2,134 BP (Behar 2012b)
- Possible place of origin: Insufficient Data
- Ancestor: I1a
- Defining mutations: G203A, C3990T, G9947A, A9966G!, T10915C! (Behar & Family Tree DNA 2012)

Genbank ID	Population	Source
EF177414	Portugal	Pereira 2007
FJ460562	Tunisia	Costa 2009
JQ245767	Turkey	Fernandes 2012
JQ245802	Morocco	Fernandes 2012
JQ702519	–	Behar 2012b
JQ702882	–	Behar 2012b
JQ703835	–	Behar 2012b
JQ705025	–	Behar 2012b
JQ705645	–	Behar 2012b
JQ705889	–	Behar 2012b
JX152861	Denmark	Raule 2014
JX153351	Denmark	Raule 2014
JX297189	Spain	Cardoso 2013
KJ570782	Czech	FamilyTreeDNA
MG551928	England	FamilyTreeDNA
MH120632	Poland	Piotrowska-Nowak 2019a
MK874614	Scotland	FamilyTreeDNA
MK967511	Ireland	FamilyTreeDNA
OM194303	Kazakhs	Askapuli 2022
OM238070	Scottish	FamilyTreeDNA
OP681985	Canary Islanders	García-Olivares 2023
OP682630	Canary Islanders	García-Olivares 2023
OP682053	Canary Islanders	García-Olivares 2023
OP682263	Canary Islanders	García-Olivares 2023

====== I1a1a ======
Haplogroup I1a1a
- Possible time of origin: 3,327 ± 2,720 BP (Behar 2012b)
- Possible place of origin: Insufficient Data
- Ancestor: I1a1
- Defining mutations: G9053A (Behar & Family Tree DNA 2012)

Genbank ID	Population	Source
AY339502	Finland	Finnila 2001
AY339503	Finland	Finnila 2001
AY339504	Finland	Finnila 2001
AY339505	Finland	Finnila 2001
JQ702939	–	Behar 2012b
JQ703652	–	Behar 2012b
JQ704013	–	Behar 2012b
JQ705140	–	Behar 2012b
JX153234	Finland	Raule 2014
KC170986	Ukrainian	FamilyTreeDNA
KF146236	Poland	Olivieri 2013
KF146237	Italy	Olivieri 2013
KY409854	Sardinians	Olivieri 2017
KY410140	Sardinians	Olivieri 2017
KY671032	Russia	Malyarchuk 2017
KY671065	Russia	Malyarchuk 2017
KY671085	Russia	Malyarchuk 2017
MG646256	Poland	Piotrowska-Nowak 2019b
MG646266	Poland	Piotrowska-Nowak 2019b
MG952793	Hungary	Malyarchuk 2018
MH120465	Poland	Piotrowska-Nowak 2019a
MH120665	Poland	Piotrowska-Nowak 2019a
MK103008	Swedish	FamilyTreeDNA
MK202791	Russian	FamilyTreeDNA
MK732936	Finnish	FamilyTreeDNA
OL638786	Brazil	Avila 2022
OL638813	Brazil	Avila 2022
OM714626	Slovak	Grzybowski 2023
OM714682	Slovak	Grzybowski 2023
OM714689	Slovak	Grzybowski 2023
OM714735	Czech	Grzybowski 2023
OM714742	Czech	Grzybowski 2023
OR438500	Poland	Piotrowska-Nowak 2023
OR438613	Poland	Piotrowska-Nowak 2023

====== I1a1a1 ======
GenBank ID	Population	Source
AY339506	Finland	Finnila 2001
KF899911	Russia	FamilyTreeDNA
JX152986	Finland	Raule 2014
MH983007	Finland	FamilyTreeDNA
MK040467	Finland	FamilyTreeDNA

====== I1a1a2 ======
GenBank ID	Population	Source
AY339507	Finland	Finnila 2001
AY339508	Finland	Finnila 2001
AY339509	Finland	Finnila 2001
OL555719	Finnish	YSEQ

====== I1a1a3 ======
GenBank ID	Population	Source
JQ245749	Czech	Fernandes 2012
JQ705378	–	Behar 2012b
KJ765971	Finnish	FamilyTreeDNA
KT277305	–	FamilyTreeDNA
KY348642	Scottish	FamilyTreeDNA
KY782222	Poland	Malyarchuk 2017
MW413811	Ukrainian	FamilyTreeDNA
PQ280055	Belarusian	Malyarchuk 2025

====== I1a1a3a ======
GenBank ID	Population	Source
JQ245748	Czech	Fernandes 2012
KJ816752	Lithuanian	FamilyTreeDNA
KY671110	Russia	Malyarchuk 2017
OL638952	Brazil	Speransa 2022

====== I1a1b ======
Haplogroup I1a1b
- Possible time of origin: 2,608 ± 2,973 BP (Behar 2012b)
- Possible place of origin: Insufficient Data
- Ancestor: I1a1
- Defining mutations: T14182C (Behar & Family Tree DNA 2012)

Genbank ID	Population	Source
JQ702470	–	Behar 2012b
JQ704690	–	Behar 2012b
JQ705595	–	Behar 2012b
JX153797	Denmark	Raule 2014
JX154050	Denmark	Raule 2014
KF586486	Ireland	FamilyTreeDNA
KJ849732	Swedes	FamilyTreeDNA
KJ850479	English	FamilyTreeDNA
KM822854	Scotland	FamilyTreeDNA
KT074442	Finland	FamilyTreeDNA
KU672519	Ireland	FamilyTreeDNA
KX906927	Ireland	FamilyTreeDNA
MG182421	Ireland	FamilyTreeDNA
MG548632	Welsh	FamilyTreeDNA
MN163828	Finland	FamilyTreeDNA
MT984338	Ireland	YSEQ
MZ457933	Ireland	FamilyTreeDNA
MZ846395	Shetland	Dulias 2022

====== I1a1c ======
Haplogroup I1a1c
- Possible time of origin: About 1,523 BP (Behar 2012b)
- Possible place of origin: Insufficient Data
- Ancestor: I1a1
- Defining mutations: T6620C (Behar & Family Tree DNA 2012)

Genbank ID	Population	Source
GU123027	Mishar Tatars (Buinsk)	Malyarchuk 2010b
JQ702023	–	Behar 2012b
JQ702457	–	Behar 2012b
KF146238	Ukraine	Olivieri 2013
MG386697	German	FamilyTreeDNA
MH918097	Lithuania	FamilyTreeDNA
OL638548	Brazil	Avila 2022
OM714767	Czech	Grzybowski 2023
PQ274761	Belarusian	Malyarchuk 2025
PQ285788	Russian	Malyarchuk 2025b
PX929695	Romanian Jews	FamilyTreeDNA

====== I1a1d ======
Haplogroup I1a1d
- Possible time of origin: About 1,892 BP (Behar 2012b)
- Possible place of origin: Insufficient Data
- Ancestor: I1a1
- Defining mutations: A1836G, T4023C, T13488C, T16189C! (Behar & Family Tree DNA 2012)

Genbank ID	Population	Source
JQ702342	–	Behar 2012b
JQ705189	–	Behar 2012b
KT124612	Wales	FamilyTreeDNA
KX949567	United Kingdom	FamilyTreeDNA
MZ846966	Orkney	Dulias 2022
OQ101207	English	FamilyTreeDNA
OR193751	Wales	FamilyTreeDNA

====== I1a1e ======
GenBank ID	Population	Source
JQ701900	–	Behar 2012b
JQ702820	–	Behar 2012b
KJ095105	Ireland	FamilyTreeDNA
KU375199	England	FamilyTreeDNA
KY671114	Russia	Malyarchuk 2017
MK570297	England	FamilyTreeDNA
MN599048	Norway	FamilyTreeDNA
MZ846316	Shetland	Dulias 2022
MZ846989	Orkney	Dulias 2022
MZ847013	Orkney	Dulias 2022
MZ847773	Orkney	Dulias 2022
MZ847969	Orkney	Dulias 2022
MZ848045	Orkney	Dulias 2022

===== I1b =====
Haplogroup I1b
- Possible time of origin: 11,135 ± 4,818 BP (Behar 2012b)
- Possible place of origin: Insufficient Data
- Ancestor: I1
- Defining mutations: T6227C (Behar & Family Tree DNA 2012)

Genbank ID	Population	Source
AY195769	Caucasian	Mishmar 2003
AY714041	India	Palanichamy 2004
EF556153	Jewish Diaspora	Behar 2008a
FJ234984	Armenian	FamilyTreeDNA
FJ968796	–	FamilyTreeDNA
JQ704018	–	Behar 2012b
JQ705376	–	Behar 2012b
KC911562	Iran	Derenko 2013
KF146240	Italy	Olivieri 2013
KF146241	Iran	Olivieri 2013
KF146242	Iran	Olivieri 2013
KF146243	Italy	Olivieri 2013
KJ890387.1	Swedish	FamilyTreeDNA
KJ890390	German	FamilyTreeDNA
KJ937089	Armenian	FamilyTreeDNA
KM986573	Yemen	Vyas 2016
KM986617	Yemen	Vyas 2016
KY073882	Hungary	FamilyTreeDNA
KY410160	Sardinians	Olivieri 2017
KY671121	Russia	Malyarchuk 2017
KY680312	Sweden	FamilyTreeDNA
MF362869	Armenian	Margaryan 2017
MG272907	Thailand	Kutanan 2018
MH378689	Chechen	FamilyTreeDNA
MK491399	Armenian	Derenko 2019
MN595812	Pakistan	Rahman 2021
MW959772	English	FamilyTreeDNA
OM714633	Slovak	Grzybowski 2023
OR838478	Saudi Arabia	FamilyTreeDNA
PQ137400	Pakistan	Bukhari 2025

===== I1c =====
Haplogroup I1c
- Possible time of origin: 8,216 ± 3,787 BP (Behar 2012b)
- Possible place of origin: Insufficient Data
- Ancestor: I1
- Defining mutations: G8573A, C16264T, G16319A, T16362C (Behar & Family Tree DNA 2012)

GenBank ID	Population	Source
JQ705932	–	Behar 2012b
KP783168	Turkish	FamilyTreeDNA
MG748728	Spain	FamilyTreeDNA
OL619849	Mongolia	Cardinali 2022
OR769030	Turkey	YSEQ

====== I1c1 ======
GenBank ID	Population	Source
KF146244	Italy	Olivieri 2013
MF437134	United Arab Emirates	Al-Jasmi 2020
MH120606	Poland	Piotrowska-Nowak 2019a
OL638549	Brazil	Avila 2022

====== I1c1a1 ======
GenBank ID	Population	Source
EU564849	Lithuanian Jews	FamilyTreeDNA
JQ702655	–	Behar 2012b
JQ705190	–	Behar 2012b
JQ705364	–	Behar 2012b
KJ558222	Lithuanian Jews	FamilyTreeDNA
KJ801472	-	Lang 2015
KU052787	Lithuanian Jews	FamilyTreeDNA
MZ158184	Belarusian Jews	FamilyTreeDNA
OR182493	Hungarian Jews	Brook 2022

====== I1c1a2 ======
GenBank ID	Population	Source
KX156834	Chechens	FamilyTreeDNA

===== I1d =====
GenBank ID	Population	Source
KF146245	Italy	Olivieri 2013
KF146246	Italy	Olivieri 2013

===== I1e =====
GenBank ID	Population	Source
JX462710	India	Khan 2013
KY697192	Italians	FamilyTreeDNA
KY982964	-	FamilyTreeDNA

===== I1f =====
GenBank ID	Population	Source
JX153931	Denmark	Raule 2014
JX153979	Denmark	Raule 2014
KF251094	English	FamilyTreeDNA
KJ557251	Scottish	FamilyTreeDNA
KJ809106	England	FamilyTreeDNA
MK434282	Norway	FamilyTreeDNA

==== I2'3 ====
Haplogroup I2'3
- Possible time of origin: 11,308 ± 4,154 BP (Behar 2012b)
- Possible place of origin: Insufficient Data
- Ancestor: I
- Defining mutations: T152C!, G207A (Behar & Family Tree DNA 2012)

It is the common root clade for subclades I2 and I3. There's a sample from Tanzania with which I2'3 shares a variant at position 152 from the root node of haplogroup I, and this "node 152" could be upstream I2'3s clade (Olivieri 2013). Both I2 and I3 might have formed during the Holocene period, and most of their subclades are from Europe, only few from the Near East (Olivieri 2013). Examples of this ancestral branch have not been documented.

===== I2 =====
Haplogroup I2
- Possible time of origin: 6,387 ± 2,449 BP (Behar 2012b)
- Possible place of origin: Insufficient Data
- Ancestor: I2'3
- Defining mutations: A15758G (Behar & Family Tree DNA 2012)

GenBank ID	Population	Source
EU570217	Ireland	FamilyTreeDNA
FJ911909	–	FamilyTreeDNA
GU122984	Volga Tatars	Malyarchuk 2010b
GU294854	–	FamilyTreeDNA
HQ287882	–	Pope 2011
JQ701942	–	Behar 2012b
JQ702191	–	Behar 2012b
JQ702284	–	Behar 2012b
JQ703850	–	Behar 2012b
JQ704705	–	Behar 2012b
JQ704765	–	Behar 2012b
JQ704936	–	Behar 2012b
JQ705000	–	Behar 2012b
JQ705304	–	Behar 2012b
JQ705379	–	Behar 2012b
JQ245744	Chechnya	Fernandes 2012
JQ245747	Czech	Fernandes 2012
JQ245771	Turkey	Fernandes 2012
JX153641	Denmark	Raule 2014
JX153773	Denmark	Raule 2014
KC911614	Iranian Azerbaijanis	Derenko 2013
KF146254	Italy	Olivieri 2013
KF146255	Ukraine	Olivieri 2013
KF146256	Italy	Olivieri 2013
KF146257	Italy	Olivieri 2013
KJ599625	Chechens	FamilyTreeDNA
KJ645815	Armenians	FamilyTreeDNA
KP969064	Norway	FamilyTreeDNA
KR014102	Italy	FamilyTreeDNA
KU682980	Uyghurs	Zheng 2018
KU683033	Uyghurs	Zheng 2018
KU683240	Uyghurs	Zheng 2018
KU683502	Uyghurs	Zheng 2018
KY000078	Norway	FamilyTreeDNA
KY042020	Sweden	FamilyTreeDNA
KY172919	Sweden	FamilyTreeDNA
KY428665	England	FamilyTreeDNA
KY671062	Russia	Malyarchuk 2017
KY671122	Russia	Malyarchuk 2017
KY780115	Irish	FamilyTreeDNA
MF068709	Germany	FamilyTreeDNA
MF116368	Sweden	FamilyTreeDNA
MF279144	Sweden	FamilyTreeDNA
MF278022	England	FamilyTreeDNA
MF362766	Armenians	Margaryan 2017
MN540393	England	FamilyTreeDNA
MT075870	Ireland	FamilyTreeDNA
MT223153	Ireland	FamilyTreeDNA
MZ846734	Shetland	Dulias 2022
MZ847795	Orkney	Dulias 2022
OM936970	Netherlands	FamilyTreeDNA
ON060656	Ireland	FamilyTreeDNA
PP263591	Ireland	FamilyTreeDNA

====== I2a ======
Haplogroup I2a
- Possible time of origin: 3,771 ± 2,143 BP (Behar 2012b)
- Possible place of origin: Insufficient Data
- Ancestor: I2
- Defining mutations: A11065G, G16145A (Behar & Family Tree DNA 2012)

GenBank ID	Population	Source
HQ326985	–	FamilyTreeDNA
HQ695930	–	FamilyTreeDNA
HQ714959	Scotland	FamilyTreeDNA
JQ705921	–	Behar 2012b
PP579598	Norwegian	FamilyTreeDNA
PP849723	–	FamilyTreeDNA

====== I2a1 ======
Haplogroup I2a1
- Possible time of origin: 2,986 ± 1,968 BP (Behar 2012b)
- Possible place of origin: Insufficient Data
- Ancestor: I2a
- Defining mutations: T3398C (Behar & Family Tree DNA 2012)

GenBank ID	Population	Source
AY339497	Finland	Finnila 2001
HQ724528	Ireland	FamilyTreeDNA
JN411083	Ireland	FamilyTreeDNA

====== I2a1a ======
GenBank ID	Population	Source
MT892955	Finland	FamilyTreeDNA

====== I2a2 ======
GenBank ID	Population	Source
JQ703910	–	Behar 2012b
KP987219	Ireland	FamilyTreeDNA
KR088263	England	FamilyTreeDNA

====== I2a3 ======
GenBank ID	Population	Source
JQ705175	–	Behar 2012b
JX154048	Denmark	Raule 2014
KU493988	Sweden	FamilyTreeDNA
MK591009	Ireland	FamilyTreeDNA
MT137386	Ireland	FamilyTreeDNA

====== I2b ======
Haplogroup I2b
- Possible time of origin: About 1,267 BP (Behar 2012b)
- Possible place of origin: Insufficient Data
- Ancestor: I2
- Defining mutations: T6515C, 8281-8289d, A16166c (Behar & Family Tree DNA 2012)

GenBank ID	Population	Source
AY339498	Finland	Finnila 2001
AY339499	Finland	Finnila 2001
AY339500	Finland	Finnila 2001
AY339501	Finland	Finnila 2001

====== I2c ======
Haplogroup I2c
- Possible time of origin: About 2,268 BP (Behar 2012b)
- Possible place of origin: Insufficient Data
- Ancestor: I2
- Defining mutations: T460C, G9438A (Behar & Family Tree DNA 2012)

GenBank ID	Population	Source
JQ702163	–	Behar 2012b
JQ702253	–	Behar 2012b
JQ703024	–	Behar 2012b
JQ705187	–	Behar 2012b
JQ705666	–	Behar 2012b
KJ882427	France	FamilyTreeDNA
KR051235	Scotland	FamilyTreeDNA
KU291444	Scotland	FamilyTreeDNA
MZ846506	Shetland	Dulias 2022
MZ846570	Shetland	Dulias 2022
MZ847001	Orkney	Dulias 2022
MZ847048	Orkney	Dulias 2022
OL604518	Scotland	FamilyTreeDNA
OP682030	Canary Islanders	García-Olivares 2023

====== I2d ======
Haplogroup I2d
- Possible time of origin: About 3,828 BP (Behar 2012b)
- Possible place of origin: Insufficient Data
- Ancestor: I2
- Defining mutations: G6480A (Behar & Family Tree DNA 2012)

GenBank ID	Population	Source
JQ705244	–	Behar 2012b
JQ703829	–	Behar 2012b
JX153642	Denmark	Raule 2014
KY684194	Germans	FamilyTreeDNA
MG646226	Poland	Piotrowska-Nowak 2019b
MH087474	English	FamilyTreeDNA
MH120469	Poland	Piotrowska-Nowak 2019a
MH120515	Poland	Piotrowska-Nowak 2019a
MH675881	Finland	FamilyTreeDNA

====== I2e ======
Haplogroup I2e
- Possible time of origin: About 2,936 BP (Behar 2012b)
- Possible place of origin: Insufficient Data
- Ancestor: I2
- Defining mutations: G3591A (Behar & Family Tree DNA 2012)

GenBank ID	Population	Source
JQ702578	–	Behar 2012b
JQ703106	–	Behar 2012b
MN176248	Poland	Piotrowska-Nowak 2020
MN176270	Poland	Piotrowska-Nowak 2020

===== I3 =====
Haplogroup I3
- Possible time of origin: 8,679 ± 3,410 BP (Behar 2012b)
- Possible place of origin: Insufficient Data
- Ancestor: I2'3
- Defining mutations: T239C (Behar & Family Tree DNA 2012)

GenBank ID	Population	Source
JQ702647	–	Behar 2012b
JQ703862	–	Behar 2012b
OL521838	Ireland	FamilyTreeDNA

====== I3a ======
Haplogroup I3a
- Possible time of origin: 6,091 ± 3,262 BP (Behar 2012b)
- Possible place of origin: Oldest sample from Poltavka culture (Russia-Lopatino II, Sok River, Samara, 2885–2665 BC) (Mathieson 2015)
- Ancestor: I3
- Defining mutations: T16086C (Behar & Family Tree DNA 2012)

GenBank ID	Population	Source
EU746658	France	FamilyTreeDNA
EU869314	–	FamilyTreeDNA
JQ245751	Greece	Fernandes 2012
JQ702041	–	Behar 2012b
JQ702062	–	Behar 2012b
JQ702109	–	Behar 2012b
JQ702413	–	Behar 2012b
JX153712	Denmark	Raule 2014
KF146258	Iran	Olivieri 2013
KJ507246	Flemish	FamilyTreeDNA
KJ850495	English	FamilyTreeDNA
KU859398	Belgium	FamilyTreeDNA
KY369150	Italy	FamilyTreeDNA
KY408233	Sardinians	Olivieri 2017
MF002495	Germany	FamilyTreeDNA
MF322516	Irish	FamilyTreeDNA
MK088054	France	FamilyTreeDNA
MZ614451	Scotland	FamilyTreeDNA
ON980565	Scotland	FamilyTreeDNA
OP682222	Canary Islanders	García-Olivares 2023
OP682259	Canary Islanders	García-Olivares 2023
OP682273	Canary Islanders	García-Olivares 2023
OP682309	Canary Islanders	García-Olivares 2023
OP682392	Canary Islanders	García-Olivares 2023
OP682401	Canary Islanders	García-Olivares 2023
OQ470330	Norwegians	FamilyTreeDNA

====== I3a1 ======
Haplogroup I3a1
- Possible time of origin: 5,070 ± 3,017 BP (Behar 2012b)
- Possible place of origin: Insufficient Data
- Ancestor: I3a
- Defining mutations: G2849A (Behar & Family Tree DNA 2012)

GenBank ID	Population	Source
AY963586	Italy	Bandelt
HQ420832	France	FamilyTreeDNA
JQ704837	–	Behar 2012b
KP903567	Austria	FamilyTreeDNA
MH120756	Poland	Piotrowska-Nowak 2019a
OL638572	Brazil	Avila 2022

====== I3b ======
Haplogroup I3b
- Possible time of origin: 5,596 ± 3,629 BP (Behar 2012b)
- Possible place of origin: Insufficient Data
- Ancestor: I3
- Defining mutations: C16494T (Behar & Family Tree DNA 2012)

GenBank ID	Population	Source
GU590993	Ireland	FamilyTreeDNA
JQ705377	–	Behar 2012b

====== I3c ======
GenBank ID	Population	Source
JQ702493	–	Behar 2012b
JQ703883	–	Behar 2012b
KJ021060	-	FamilyTreeDNA

====== I3d ======
GenBank ID	Population	Source
OR233329	Russians	FamilyTreeDNA
OR438549	Poland	Piotrowska-Nowak 2023

==== I4 ====
Haplogroup I4
- Possible time of origin: 14,913 ± 5,955 BP (Behar 2012b)
- Possible place of origin: Insufficient Data
- Ancestor: I
- Defining mutations: G8519A (Behar & Family Tree DNA 2012)

The clade splits into subclades I4a and newly defined I4b, with samples found in Europe, the Near East and the Caucasus (Olivieri 2013).

GenBank ID	Population	Source
KJ021059	Polish	FamilyTreeDNA

===== I4a =====
Haplogroup I4a
- Possible time of origin: About 2,124 BP (Behar 2012b)
- Possible place of origin: Insufficient Data
- Ancestor: I4
- Defining mutations: A10819G (Behar & Family Tree DNA 2012)

GenBank ID	Population	Source
EU091245	–	FamilyTreeDNA
JN660158	Armenian	FamilyTreeDNA
JQ245737	North Ossetia	Fernandes 2012
JQ701909	–	Behar 2012b
JQ701957	–	Behar 2012b
JQ705303	–	Behar 2012b
JQ705514	–	Behar 2012b
JQ706017	–	Behar 2012b
JQ702369	–	Behar 2012b
JX153115	Calabria, Italy	Raule 2014
JX153325	Denmark	Raule 2014
KJ676825	German	FamilyTreeDNA
KJ676862	French Canadians	FamilyTreeDNA
KT390700	Ireland	FamilyTreeDNA
KT851987	Israel	FamilyTreeDNA
KX495667	Armenian	FamilyTreeDNA
KY034415	Croatia	FamilyTreeDNA
MF362868	Armenians	Margaryan 2017
MF662102	English	FamilyTreeDNA
MG660526	Chelkans	Nazhmidenova 2020
MH120634	Poland	Piotrowska-Nowak 2019a
MH120664	Poland	Piotrowska-Nowak 2019a
MZ846849	Orkney	Dulias 2022
MZ846865	Orkney	Dulias 2022
MZ847386	Orkney	Dulias 2022
MZ847388	Orkney	Dulias 2022
MZ847393	Orkney	Dulias 2022
OL638882	Brazil	Avila 2022
ON457162	–	FamilyTreeDNA
ON602072	England	FamilyTreeDNA
OQ645346	German	FamilyTreeDNA
PQ424518	–	FamilyTreeDNA
PV621707	Morocco	Colombo 2025

====== I4a1 ======
GenBank ID	Population	Source
EF153786	Siberia	Derenko 2007
EF660987	Italy	Gasparre 2007
HM804481	–	FamilyTreeDNA
JQ705060	–	Behar 2012b
JQ705191	–	Behar 2012b
JQ705906	–	Behar 2012b
KJ676824	German	FamilyTreeDNA
KJ890389	Russia	FamilyTreeDNA
KU922938	Wales	FamilyTreeDNA
KY849396	Swedes	FamilyTreeDNA
MG015877	Swedes	FamilyTreeDNA
MG646165	Poland	Piotrowska-Nowak 2019b
MH322053	Germany	FamilyTreeDNA
MW691107	Ireland	FamilyTreeDNA
ON010030	Sweden	FamilyTreeDNA

====== I4a2 ======
GenBank ID	Population	Source
KF254840	Finland	FamilyTreeDNA

===== I4b =====
GenBank ID	Population	Source
JQ704976	–	Behar 2012b
KF146261	Iran	Olivieri 2013
KX467275	India	Sharma 2018
MF522885	East Pamir Kyrgyz	Peng 2017
MF522894	East Pamir Kyrgyz	Peng 2017
MG744604	Germany	FamilyTreeDNA
MN595698	Pakistan	Rahman 2021
MN595704	Pakistan	Rahman 2021
MN595717	Pakistan	Rahman 2021
MN595823	Pakistan	Rahman 2021

==== I5 ====
Haplogroup I5
- Possible time of origin: 18,806 ± 4,005 BP (Behar 2012b)
- Possible place of origin: Insufficient Data
- Ancestor: I
- Defining mutations: A14233G (Behar & Family Tree DNA 2012)

Is the second most frequent clade of the haplogroup. Its subclades are found in Europe, e.g. I5a1, and the Near East, e.g. I5a2a and I5b (Olivieri 2013).

GenBank ID	Population	Source
HQ658465	German (north)	FamilyTreeDNA
JQ245724	North Ossetia	Fernandes 2012
KJ920750	German (west)	FamilyTreeDNA
KT250729	German (east)	FamilyTreeDNA
KT346427	Polish	FamilyTreeDNA
MK617274	Serbia	Davidovic 2020

===== I5a =====
Haplogroup I5a
- Possible time of origin: 15,116 ± 4,128 BP (Behar 2012b)
- Possible place of origin: Insufficient Data
- Ancestor: I5
- Defining mutations: T5074C, C16148T (Behar & Family Tree DNA 2012)

GenBank ID	Population	Source
KT748522	Pontic Greeks	FamilyTreeDNA
KX017466	Finnish	FamilyTreeDNA
MF362944	Armenians	Margaryan 2017
MN696689	Finnish	FamilyTreeDNA

====== I5a1 ======
Haplogroup I5a1
- Possible time of origin: 11,062 ± 4,661 BP (Behar 2012b)
- Possible place of origin: Insufficient Data
- Ancestor: I5a
- Defining mutations: 8281-8289d, A12961G (Behar & Family Tree DNA 2012)

GenBank ID	Population	Source
JQ245807	Bulgaria	Fernandes 2012
JX152976	Finland	Raule 2014
KM925143	Finland	FamilyTreeDNA
MK134361	Serbia	Davidovic 2020
MK217239	Assyrians	Shamoon-Pour 2019

====== I5a1a ======
GenBank ID	Population	Source
JQ705096	–	Behar 2012b
KF146248	Italy	Olivieri 2013
KJ746501	English	FamilyTreeDNA
KX856070	English	FamilyTreeDNA
MG744602	French	FamilyTreeDNA

====== I5a1b ======
GenBank ID	Population	Source
AF382007	Leon	Maca-Meyer 2001
EF660917	Italy	Gasparre 2007
JQ704713	–	Behar 2012b

====== I5a1c ======
GenBank ID	Population	Source
EU597573	Bedouin (Israel)	Hartmann 2009
JQ704768	–	Behar 2012b
KF146247	Italy	Olivieri 2013

====== I5a1g ======
GenBank ID	Population	Source
MT338490	German (Remscheid, Luttringhausen, North Rhine-Westphalia)	FamilyTreeDNA

====== I5a2 ======
GenBank ID	Population	Source
JQ701894	–	Behar 2012b
KY408295	Sardinians	Olivieri 2017
KY408387	Sardinians	Olivieri 2017
MH168104	Ukrainians	FamilyTreeDNA
MZ384391	United Kingdom	FamilyTreeDNA
PP302047	Dutch	FamilyTreeDNA

====== I5a2a ======
GenBank ID	Population	Source
JQ245733	Dubai	Fernandes 2012
JQ245780	Yemen	Fernandes 2012
JQ245781	Yemen	Fernandes 2012
JQ245782	Yemen	Fernandes 2012
JQ245783	Yemen	Fernandes 2012
JQ245784	Yemen	Fernandes 2012
JQ245785	Yemen	Fernandes 2012
JQ245786	Yemen	Fernandes 2012

====== I5a3 ======
GenBank ID	Population	Source
JN415483	Germany	Achilli 2012
JQ245772	Turkey	Fernandes 2012

====== I5a4 ======
GenBank ID	Population	Source
FJ348190	Hutterite	Pichler 2010
HM852869	Turkey	Schoenberg 2011
KF146249	Italy	Olivieri 2013
KJ676977	Romanian	FamilyTreeDNA
KY615004	Rusyns	FamilyTreeDNA

===== I5b =====
GenBank ID	Population	Source
KF255549	Italy	FamilyTreeDNA
ON640629	Cyprus	FamilyTreeDNA

===== I5c =====
GenBank ID	Population	Source
KM245143	Spain	Fregel 2015
KP419690	Italians	FamilyTreeDNA
MF362879	Armenians	Margaryan 2017
MK491434	Armenians	Derenko 2019
OP642525	Chechens	FamilyTreeDNA

====== I5c1 ======
GenBank ID	Population	Source
HQ658465	German	FamilyTreeDNA
KC787372	English	FamilyTreeDNA
KF146251	Italy	Olivieri 2013
KY409830	Sardinians	Olivieri 2017
KY981527	Sardinians	FamilyTreeDNA
OL438769	Romanians	FamilyTreeDNA

==== I6 ====
Haplogroup I6
- Possible time of origin: About 18,400 BP (Olivieri 2013)
- Possible place of origin: Insufficient Data
- Ancestor: I
- Defining mutations: T3645C (Behar & Family Tree DNA 2012)

The subclade is very rare, found until July 2013 only in four samples from the Near East (Olivieri 2013).

GenBank ID	Population	Source
JQ245773	Turkey	Fernandes 2012
MK036912	Croatia	FamilyTreeDNA
PV621708	Moroccan Arab	Colombo 2025

===== I6a =====
Haplogroup I6a
- Possible time of origin: About 5,300 BP (Olivieri 2013)
- Possible place of origin: Insufficient Data
- Ancestor: I6
- Defining mutations: (G203A), G3915A, A6116G, A7804G, T15287C, (A16293c) (Behar & Family Tree DNA 2012)

GenBank ID	Population	Source
AY245555	–	Janssen 2006
JQ705382	–	Behar 2012b
KM262180	Italy	FamilyTreeDNA
KY409776	Sardinians	Olivieri 2017

==== I7 ====
Haplogroup I7
- Possible time of origin: About 9,100 BP (Olivieri 2013)
- Possible place of origin: Insufficient Data
- Ancestor: I
- Defining mutations: C3534T, A4829G, T16324C

It is the rarest defined subclade, until July 2013 found only in two samples from the Near East and the Caucasus (Olivieri 2013).

GenBank ID	Population	Source
JF298212	Armenian	FamilyTreeDNA
KF146253	Kuwait	Olivieri 2013

== See also ==
=== Genetics ===
- Genealogical DNA test
- Genetic genealogy
- Human mitochondrial DNA haplogroup
- Human mitochondrial genetics
- Human mitochondrial molecular clock
- Mitochondrial Eve
- Population genetics

=== Backbone mtDNA Tree ===
Phylogenetic tree of human mitochondrial DNA (mtDNA) haplogroups

Mitochondrial Eve (L)

L0
L1–6

L1
L2

L3

L4
L5
L6
M
N

CZ
D
E
G
Q

O
A
S
R

I
W
X
Y
C
Z
B
F
R0

pre-JT

P

U
HV
JT
K
H
V
J
T
