= Haplogroup R (mtDNA) =

Human mitochondrial DNA haplogroup

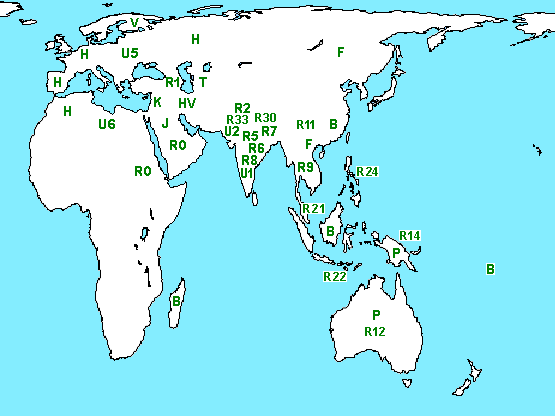
- Possible time of origin: 66.8±14.2 kya
- Possible place of origin: Southeast Asia
- Ancestor: N
- Descendants: R0, R1, R2'JT, R5, R6, R7, R8, R9, R-T16189C!, R12'21, R14, R23, R30, R31, R32, P, U
- Defining mutations: 12705, 16223

Haplogroup R is a widely distributed human mitochondrial DNA (mtDNA) haplogroup. Haplogroup R is associated with the peopling of Eurasia after about 70,000 years ago, and is distributed in modern populations throughout the world outside of sub-Saharan Africa.

Haplogroup R is a descendant of the macro-haplogroup N. Among the R clade's descendant haplogroups are B, U (and thus K), F, R0 (and thus HV, H, and V), and JT (the ancestral haplogroup of J and T).

== Origin ==
Soares et al. (2009) estimate the age of haplogroup R at roughly 50,000 to 70,000 years ago.

This is consistent with an emergence in the course of the Southern Dispersal out of East Africa to West, South and Southeast Asia. It has been suggested that the early lineage of haplogroups M, N and R along the coastal route during the period of roughly 70,000 to 60,000 years ago. The northern route out of Africa is another possibility, where the expansion of haplogroup R may originate from Southeast Asia.

Haplogroup R has wide diversity and antiquity in the indigenous population of South Asia. Tribes and castes of Western and Southern India show higher diversity than the other regions, possibly suggesting their autochthonous status. Larruga et al. (2017) found mtDNA R spread to Eurasia and Australia from a core area along the Southeast Asian coast.

== Archaeogenetics ==
The Ust'-Ishim man of Siberia, dated ca. 45,000 years old, belongs to haplogroup R* (formerly classified as U*).

Haplogroup R has also been observed among Egyptian mummies excavated at the Abusir archaeological site in Lower Egypt, which date from the late New Kingdom of Egypt, the Ptolemaic Kingdom, and Roman Egypt.

Subclade R2 was observed in the remains of a Neolithic human from western Iran in Tepe Abdul Hosein.

== Distribution ==
Haplogroup R and its descendants are distributed all over Australasia, Americas, Southeast Asia, South Asia, Central Asia, West Asia, East Asia, Europe, North Africa and Horn of Africa.

The basal R* clade is found among the Soqotri (1.2%), as well as in Northeast Africa (1.5%), the Middle East (0.8%), the Near East (0.8%), and the Arabian Peninsula (0.3%).

=== Subclades ===
- Haplogroup R
  - R0 or pre-HV
    - R0a or (preHV)1: Occurs commonly in the Arabian peninsula, with its highest frequency observed among the Soqotri. Moderate frequencies found in North Africa, the Horn of Africa, and Central Asia.
    - HV: It is a west Eurasian haplogroup mainly found throughout the Middle East, including Iran. It is also found in North Africa, Central Asia and South Asia.
        - V: Found at moderately low frequencies around Europe; the highest frequency is in the Sami people 40%.
      - HV1: Mainly in the Middle East.
      - HV2: Mainly in South Asia.
      - HV3: Mainly in Eastern Europe.
      - H: In West Eurasia. It is the most common mtDNA haplogroup in Europe.
  - R1
      - R1a* (3337): Found in Brahmins from Uttar Pradesh (India).
      - R1b: Observed in an Eastern hunter gatherer from Karelia, Russia, dated to 5500 BCE.
        - R1b1: Observed in Bulgaria, Armenia (including an ancient specimen), and India
          - R1b1a: Observed in Uyghurs
          - R1b1b: Observed in Finland (including Finland Swedes)
        - R1b2
          - R1b2a: Observed in Yakuts
          - R1b2b: Observed in Uyghurs
  - pre-JT or R2'JT
    - R2: Present in low frequencies in Middle East, Pakistan, and India. Found in a few populations in the Volga basin. Found in Balochistan (Pakistan)
      - (13500): Found in Rajasthan and Uttar Pradesh (India).
      - (150, 303+1C): In Iran, Georgia and Turkey.
    - JT
      - J: The highest frequency is in the Near East (12%), 21% in Saudi Arabia. J declines towards Europe at 11%, Caucasus 8%, North Africa 6% and becomes practically missing in East Asia.
      - T: The highest frequency is in the Caspian region (Caucasus, Northern Iran, Turkmenistan). It is important in Europe (almost 10%), Middle East, Central Asia, Pakistan and North Africa. Small frequency in the Horn of Africa and India.
  - R3: Found in Armenia. Also observed in an ancient individual from Hungary, dating to 7000 years ago
  - R5: Widely spread in the Indian subcontinent. Specially in Madhya Pradesh (India) at 17%.
    - R5a
      - R5a1: Found within the Indo-European speaking populations of India.
      - R5a2: Specially among Dravidic groups of India and Sri Lanka. And Arain of Pakistan at 8%.
  - R6'7 (16362) The most important presence is among Austroasiatic language-speakers from India (10%).
    - R6: Small frequencies in India and Pakistan found prominently in both Tamil and Kashmiri populations.
    - R7: In the Indian subcontinent.
      - R7a: Mainly in East India, specially in Santals from Bihar and Jharkhand.
      - R7b: Specially in Dravidian tribes of East India.
  - R8: The highest frequency occurs towards East India, especially within Orissa (12%), and it is found among the Austroasiatic tribes (Munda and Khasi speakers). It is also present in low frequency among speakers of Dravidian, Indo-European, and Tibeto-Burman (e.g. Nyishi, Changpa, Sherpa).
    - R8a: Found mainly in Orissa and Andhra Pradesh (India).
    - R8b: In Orissa, Gujarat, Andhra Pradesh (India).
  - R9 (16304)
    - R9b: It appears mostly in Southeast Asia. Found all over Indonesia, in Indochina, Malaysia, in Aboriginal Malays like Semelai at 28% and Temuan 21%.
    - (249d)
      - R9c: All over the Malay Archipelago and Taiwan. Mainly in Batak (Palawan) at 58%, the Tsou of Taiwan (22.9%), and Alor (Indonesia) at 11%.
      - F: Fairly common in East Asia and Southeast Asia. Higher frequencies occur in some areas like Nicobar at 50% and Arunachal Pradesh 31% (India), and Shors people from Siberia at 44%. There is also an important frequency in Taiwanese aborigines, Guangdong (China), Maluku (Indonesia), Thailand and Vietnam.
  - R11'B (16189)
    - R11: Found in China, mainly in Lahu people from Yunnan at 12.5%. Also in Japan, Korea, Chams, and Rajasthan (India).
    - B
      - B4: It is found often in East Asia, Southeast Asia, Polynesia, Melanesia, Micronesia, Madagascar and Indigenous peoples of the Americas.
      - B5: Spread in East Asia and Southeast Asia.
    - R24: Found in Philippines.
  - R12'21
    - R12: Found in Australia.
    - R21: In indigenous peoples of Malaysia like Jahai Negritos at 63% and Senoi 37% as well as in the Maniq of Southern Thailand and in a few other Thai and Malaysian individuals.
  - R14: Found in Papua New Guinea and in Austronesian speakers of East Timor and Lembata.
  - R22 or R12: Very frequent in the Shompen (10/29 = 34.5%). Elsewhere found mainly in south-central Indonesia (11.4% Mataram, 8.0% Waingapu, 7.3% Bali, 1.9% Borneo) and in Cham of Bình Thuận, Vietnam (7/168 = 4.2%), with singleton or sporadic occurrences in Thailand, Sumatra, Java, Sulawesi, and Alor.
  - R23: Small clade found in Bali and Sumba (Indonesia).
  - R30
    - R30a: Found in Andhra Pradesh, Uttar Pradesh (India), in the Tharu people from Nepal and Sinhalese people from Sri Lanka.
    - R30b: Found in Punjab.
    - R30* (1598, 16189): Found in Punjab, Nepal and Japan.
  - R31
    - R31a: In Brahmins from Uttar Pradesh and Rajputs from Rajasthan (India).
    - R31b: In Reddys from Andhra Pradesh (India).
  - R32
    - Found in Mauritius
  - P: It is characteristic of Sahul. Found in Philippines and East Indonesia.
    - (16176)
      - P1: Widespread in Melanesia. Higher frequencies occur in Papua New Guinea. Also found in Maluku, Nusa Tenggara and Polynesia.
      - P2'10
        - P2: In Melanesia, specially in New Guinea and New Caledonia.
        - P10: Found in Philippines.
      - P9 (or AuE): In Aboriginal Australians from the central region.
    - P3: In Australia and Melanesia.
    - P4: In Australia and Melanesia.
  - U
    - U1: It appears mostly in the Middle East and Caucasus. Found from India to the Mediterranean and to the rest of Europe.
    - U5: Approximately 11% of total Europeans and 10% of European-Americans. The highest frequency is in the Sami people.
    - U6: It is common in North Africa and the Horn of Africa, especially in the Maghreb. Highest frequencies of the subclade occur among Algerian Berbers (29%) and Egyptian Copts (27.6%). U6 has also been found among Iberomaurusian specimens dating from the Epipaleolithic at the Taforalt prehistoric site.
    - U2'3'4'7'8'9 (1811): Widely spread in West Eurasia and the Indian subcontinent.
      - U8
        - K

== Tree ==
This phylogenetic tree of haplogroup R subclades is based on the paper by Mannis van Oven and Manfred Kayser Updated comprehensive phylogenetic tree of global human mitochondrial DNA variation and subsequent published research.

- R
  - R0 (formerly pre-HV)
    - R0a'b
      - R0a
        - R0a1
          - R0a1a
            - R0a1a1
              - R0a1a1a
            - R0a1a2
            - R0a1a3
            - R0a1a4
          - R0a1-T152C!
            - R0a1b
        - R0a-60.1T
          - R0a2'3
            - R0a2
              - R0a2a
                - R0a2a1
              - R0a2b
              - R0a2c
              - R0a2d
              - R0a2e
              - R0a2f
                - R0a2f1
                  - R0a2f1a
                  - R0a2f1b
              - R0a2g
              - R0a2h
              - R0a2i
              - R0a2-T195C!
                - R0a2j
              - R0a2k
                - R0a2k1
              - R0a2l
              - R0a2m
              - R0a2n
            - R0a3
              - R0a3a
          - R0a4
      - R0b
    - HV
      - HV0 (formerly pre-V)
        - HV0a
          - HV0a1
            - HV0a1a
          - V
        - HV0-T195C!
          - HV0b
          - HV0c
          - HV0d
          - HV0e
          - HV0f
          - HV0g
      - HV1
        - HV1a'b'c
          - HV1a
            - HV1a1
              - HV1a1a
              - HV1a1b
            - HV1a2
              - HV1a2a
              - HV1a2b
            - HV1a3
              - HV1a3a
          - HV1b
            - HV1b1
              - HV1b1a
              - HV1b1b
            - HV1b-T152C!
              - HV1b2
              - HV1b3
                - HV1b3a
                - HV1b3b
          - HV1c
        - HV1d
      - HV-A73G!
        - HV2
          - HV2a
            - HV2a1
            - HV2a2
            - HV2a3
        - HV20
      - HV4
        - HV4a
          - HV4a1
            - HV4a1-C16291T
              - HV4a1a
                - HV4a1a1
                - HV4a1a2
                - HV4a1a3
                - HV4a1a4
          - HV4a2
            - HV4a2a
            - HV4a2b
        - HV4b
        - HV4c
      - HV5
        - HV5a
        - HV5b
      - HV-T16311C!
        - HV6
          - HV6a
        - HV7
        - HV8
        - HV9
          - HV9-T152C!
            - HV9a
              - HV9a1
                - HV9a1a
          - HV9b
          - HV9c
        - HV10
        - HV11
          - HV11a
        - HV14
          - HV14a
        - HV15
        - HV16
        - HV17
          - HV17a
        - HV22
        - HV23
        - HV24
      - HV12
        - HV12a
          - HV12a1
        - HV12b
          - HV12b1
            - HV12b1a
      - HV13
        - HV13a
        - HV13b
      - HV18
      - HV19
      - HV21
      - H
  - R1
    - R1a
      - R1a1
        - R1a1a
          - R1a1a1
            - R1a1a1a
          - R1a1a2
        - R1a1b
        - R1a1c
    - R1b
      - R1b1
  - R2'JT
    - R2
      - R2-T13500C
        - R2-T13500C-T195C!
          - R2a
        - R2b
          - R2b1
        - R2c
        - R2d
    - JT
      - J
      - T
  - R5
    - R5a
      - R5a1
        - R5a1a
      - R5a2
        - R5a2a
        - R5a2b
          - R5a2b1
          - R5a2b2
          - R5a2b3
          - R5a2b4
  - R6'7
    - R6
      - R6-G16129A!
        - R6a
          - R6a1
            - R6a1a
          - R6a2
      - R6b
    - R7
      - R7a'b
        - R7a
          - R7a1
            - R7a1a
            - R7a1b
              - R7a1b1
              - R7a1b2
        - R7b
          - R7b1
            - R7b1a
              - R7b1a1
          - R7b2
  - R8 - India
    - R8a - Sri Lanka
      - R8a1
        - R8a1a
          - R8a1a1
            - R8a1a1a
              - R8a1a1a1
                - R8a1a1a1a
              - R8a1a1a2
            - R8a1a1b
            - R8a1a1c
            - R8a1a1d
          - R8a1a2
            - R8a1a2a
          - R8a1a3 - South Africa, Norway
        - R8a1-T16093C
          - R8a1b
      - R8a2
    - R8b
      - R8b1
        - R8b1a
      - R8b2
  - (16304)
    - R9
      - R9b - Cambodia, Thailand (Lao Isan in Ubon Ratchathani Province and Roi Et Province), Guinea
        - R9b1 - China, Uyghur, Thailand (Mon in Central Thailand, Thai in Western Thailand), Laos (Lao in Vientiane), Vietnam (La Hủ), Denmark
          - R9b1a
            - R9b1a1 - Philippines (Mamanwa)
              - R9b1a1a - China, Thailand (Karen and Thai Lue in Northern Thailand, Lao Isan in Roi Et Province, Thai in Central Thailand and Eastern Thailand), Cambodia (Banteay Meanchey), Malaysia (Semelai, aboriginal Malay), Singapore, Indonesia (Tengger, Palembang, Padang, Manado), Vietnam (Giarai)
            - R9b1a2 - Taiwan (Tsou), Thailand (Lao Isan in Loei Province, Thai in Western Thailand)
              - R9b1a2a - China (Han from Tai'an, etc.), Vietnam (Tay, etc.), Russia (Tubalar)
              - R9b1a2b - China, Taiwan (Minnan, Hakka), Vietnam (Tay), Thailand (Khon Mueang from Chiang Rai Province, Tai Khuen from Northern Thailand)
            - R9b1a3 - Thailand, China (Han, Dai), Vietnam (Dao, Nùng, etc.), Kazakhstan
          - R9b1b - China, Vietnam, Cambodia (Siem Reap), Thailand (Khon Mueang from Chiang Mai Province, Tai Yuan from Central Thailand, Mon from Northern Thailand)
        - R9b2 - Thailand, Cambodia, Vietnam
      - R9c - China (Barghut from Hulun Buir), Taiwan
        - R9c1
          - R9c1a - Philippines, Indonesia, Taiwan (Makatao), Thailand (Khon Mueang from Chiang Rai Province)
            - R9c1a1 - Taiwan (Makatao, Rukai, Puyuma, etc.), Guam
            - R9c1a2 - Taiwan (Tsou, Bunun)
            - R9c1a3 - Philippines (Batak of Palawan)
          - R9c1b
            - R9c1b1 - China (Han), Vietnam (Kinh, Dao), Thailand (Tai Dam in Kanchanaburi Province, Khon Mueang in Mae Hong Son Province, Tai Yuan in Northern Thailand, Thai Lue in Northern Thailand), Myanmar
            - R9c1b2 - Thailand (Khon Mueang in Chiang Rai Province), Taiwan (Makatao, etc.), Philippines (Ifugao, Bugkalot), East Timor
      - F
  - R-T16189C!
    - R11'B (16189)
      - R11'B6
        - R11
          - R11a
          - R11b
            - R11b1
              - R11b1a
              - R11b1b
        - B6
          - B6a
            - B6a1
              - B6a1a
    - B
      - B4'5
    - R24
      - R24a
  - R12'21
    - R12
    - R21
  - R14
  - R22
  - R23
  - R30
    - R30a
      - R30a1
        - R30a1a
        - R30a1b
          - R30a1b1
        - R30a1c
    - R30b
      - R30b1
      - R30b2
        - R30b2a
  - R31
    - R31a
      - R31a1
    - R31b
  - R32
  - P
  - U
