= Genetic history of Central Africa =

Central African genetic history

The genetic history of Central Africa encompasses the genetic history of the people of Central Africa. The Sahara served as a trans-regional passageway and place of dwelling for people in Africa during various humid phases and periods throughout the history of Africa.

== Archaic Human DNA ==
Archaic traits found in human fossils of West Africa (e.g., Iho Eleru fossils, which dates to 13,000 BP) and Central Africa (e.g., Ishango fossils, which dates between 25,000 BP and 20,000 BP) may have developed as a result of admixture between archaic humans and modern humans or may be evidence of late-persisting early modern humans. While Denisovan and Neanderthal ancestry in non-Africans outside of Africa are more certain, archaic human ancestry in Africans is less certain and is too early to be established with certainty.

== Ancient DNA ==
In 4000 BP (or even earlier during the Mesolithic), there may have been a population that traversed from Africa (e.g., West Africa or West-Central Africa), through the Strait of Gibraltar, into the Iberian Peninsula, where admixing between Africans and Iberians (e.g., of northern Portugal, of southern Spain) occurred. Based on a small trace presence of sub-Saharan African components in select samples from Iberia, and the discovery of a mitogenome L2a1 found in one individual, while all others belonged to European mitochondrial haplogroups.

=== Cameroon ===
West African hunter-gatherers, in the region of western Central Africa (e.g., Shum Laka, Cameroon), particularly between 8000 BP and 3000 BP, were found to be related to modern Central African hunter-gatherers (e.g., Baka, Bakola, Biaka, Bedzan).

=== Democratic Republic of Congo ===
At Kindoki, in the Democratic Republic of Congo, there were three individuals, dated to the protohistoric period (230 BP, 150 BP, 230 BP); one carried haplogroups E1b1a1a1d1a2 (E-CTS99, E-CTS99) and L1c3a1b, another carried haplogroup E (E-M96, E-PF1620), and the last carried haplogroups R1b1 (R-P25 1, R-M415) and L0a1b1a1.

At Ngongo Mbata, in the Democratic Republic of Congo, an individual, dated to the protohistoric period (220 BP), carried haplogroup L1c3a.

At Matangai Turu Northwest, in the Democratic Republic of Congo, an individual, dated to the Iron Age (750 BP), carried an undetermined haplogroup(s).

== Y-Chromosomal DNA ==
Haplogroup R-V88 may have originated in western Central Africa (e.g., Equatorial Guinea), and, in the middle of the Holocene, arrived in North Africa through population migration.

== Mitochondrial DNA ==
In 150,000 BP, Africans (e.g., Central Africans, East Africans) bearing haplogroup L1 diverged. Between 75,000 BP and 60,000 BP, Africans bearing haplogroup L3 emerged in East Africa and eventually migrated into and became present in modern West Africans, Central Africans, and non-Africans. Amid the Holocene, including the Holocene Climate Optimum in 8000 BP, Africans bearing haplogroup L2 spread within West Africa and Africans bearing haplogroup L3 spread within East Africa. As the largest migration since the Out of Africa migration, migration from Sub-Saharan Africa toward the North Africa occurred, by West Africans, Central Africans, and East Africans, resulting in migrations into Europe and Asia; consequently, Sub-Saharan African mitochondrial DNA was introduced into Europe and Asia.

Mitochondrial haplogroup L1c is strongly associated with pygmies, especially with Bambenga groups. L1c prevalence was variously reported as: 100% in Ba-Kola, 97% in Aka (Ba-Benzélé), and 77% in Biaka, 100% of the Bedzan (Tikar), 97% and 100% in the Baka people of Gabon and Cameroon, respectively, 97% in Bakoya (97%), and 82% in Ba-Bongo. Mitochondrial haplogroups L2a and L0a are prevalent among the Bambuti.

== Autosomal DNA ==
Genetically, African pygmies have some key differences between them and Bantu peoples.

== Medical DNA ==
Evidence suggests that, when compared to other Sub-Saharan African populations, African pygmy populations display unusually low levels of expression of the genes encoding for human growth hormone and its receptor associated with low serum levels of insulin-like growth factor-1 and short stature.

The genomes of Africans commonly found to undergo adaptation are regulatory DNA, and many cases of adaptation found among Africans relate to diet, physiology, and evolutionary pressures from pathogens. Throughout Sub-Saharan Africa, genetic adaptation (e.g., rs334 mutation, Duffy blood group, increased rates of G6PD deficiency, sickle cell disease) to malaria has been found among Sub-Saharan Africans, which may have initially developed in 7300 BP. Sub-Saharan Africans have more than 90% of the Duffy-null genotype. In the rainforests of Central Africa, genetic adaptation for non-height-related factors (e.g., immune traits, reproduction, thyroid function) and short stature (e.g., EHB1 and PRDM5 – bone synthesis; OBSCN and COX10 – muscular development; HESX1 and ASB14 – pituitary gland's growth hormone production/secretion) has been found among rainforest hunter-gatherers.
