= Genetic history of West Africa =

West African genetic history

The genetic history of West Africa encompasses the genetic history of the people of West Africa. The Sahara served as a trans-regional passageway and place of dwelling for people in Africa during various humid phases and periods throughout the history of Africa.

== Archaic human DNA ==
Archaic traits found in human fossils of West Africa (e.g., Iho Eleru fossils, which dates to 13,000 BP) and Central Africa (e.g., Ishango fossils, which dates between 25,000 BP and 20,000 BP) may have developed as a result of admixture between archaic humans and modern humans or may be evidence of late-persisting early modern humans. While Denisovan and Neanderthal ancestry in non-Africans outside of Africa are more certain, archaic human ancestry in Africans is less certain and is too early to be established with certainty.

== Ancient DNA ==
As of 2017, human ancient DNA has not been found in the region of West Africa. As of 2020, human ancient DNA has not been forthcoming in the region of West Africa.

In 4000 BP (or even earlier during the Mesolithic), there may have been a population that traversed from Africa (e.g., West Africa or West-Central Africa), through the Strait of Gibraltar, into the Iberian Peninsula, where admixing between Africans and Iberians (e.g., of northern Portugal, of southern Spain) occurred. Based on a small trace presence of sub-Saharan African components in select samples from Iberia, and the discovery of a mitogenome L2a1 found in one individual, while all others belonged to European mitochondrial haplogroups.

In Granada, a Muslim (Moor) of the Cordoba Caliphate, who was of haplogroups E1b1a1 and H1+16189, as well as estimated to date between 900 CE and 1000 CE, and a Morisco, who was of haplogroup L2e1, as well as estimated to date between 1500 CE and 1600 CE, were both found to be of Sub-Saharan West African (i.e., Gambian) and Iberian descent.

== Y-Chromosomal DNA ==
Eight male individuals from Guinea Bissau, two male individuals from Niger, one male individual from Mali, and one male individual from Cabo Verde carried haplogroup A1a.

As a result of haplogroup D0, a basal branch of haplogroup DE, being found in three Nigerian men, it may be the case that haplogroup DE, as well as its sublineages D0 and E, originated in Africa.

As of 19,000 years ago, Africans, bearing haplogroup E1b1a-V38, likely traversed across the Sahara, from east to west. E1b1a1-M2 likely originated in West Africa or Central Africa.

== Mitochondrial DNA ==
Between 75,000 BP and 60,000 BP, Africans bearing haplogroup L3 emerged in East Africa and eventually migrated into and became present in modern West Africans, Central Africans, and non-Africans. Amid the Holocene, including the Holocene Climate Optimum in 8000 BP, Africans bearing haplogroup L2 spread within West Africa and Africans bearing haplogroup L3 spread within East Africa. As the largest migration since the Out of Africa migration, migration from Sub-Saharan Africa toward the North Africa occurred, by West Africans, Central Africans, and East Africans, resulting in migrations into Europe and Asia; consequently, Sub-Saharan African mitochondrial DNA was introduced into Europe and Asia. During the early period of the Holocene, 50% of Sub-Saharan African mitochondrial DNA was introduced into North Africa by West Africans and the other 50% was introduced by East Africans. During the modern period, a greater number of West Africans introduced Sub-Saharan African mitochondrial DNA into North Africa than East Africans. Between 15,000 BP and 7000 BP, 86% of Sub-Saharan African mitochondrial DNA was introduced into Southwest Asia by East Africans, largely in the region of Arabia, which constitute 50% of Sub-Saharan African mitochondrial DNA in modern Southwest Asia. In the modern period, 68% of Sub-Saharan African mitochondrial DNA was introduced by East Africans and 22% was introduced by West Africans, which constitutes 50% of Sub-Saharan African mitochondrial DNA in modern Southwest Asia. During the early period of the Holocene, Sub-Saharan African mitochondrial DNA was introduced into Europe, mostly in Iberia. West Africans probably migrated, across Sahelian Africa, North Africa, and the Strait of Gibraltar, into Europe, and introduced 63% of Sub-Saharan African mitochondrial DNA. During the modern period, West Africans introduced 75% of Sub-Saharan African mitochondrial DNA into Iberia and other parts of Europe, possibly by sea voyage.

Around 18,000 BP, Mende people, along with Gambian peoples, grew in population size.

In 15,000 BP, Niger-Congo speakers may have migrated from the Sahelian region of West Africa, along the Senegal River, and introduced L2a1 into North Africa, resulting in modern Mauritanian peoples and Berbers of Tunisia inheriting it.

Between 11,000 BP and 10,000 BP, Yoruba people and Esan people grew in population size.

As early as 11,000 years ago, Sub-Saharan West Africans, bearing macrohaplogroup L (e.g., L1b1a11, L1b1a6a, L1b1a8, L1b1a9a1, L2a1k, L3d1b1a), may have migrated through North Africa and into Europe, mostly into southern Europe (e.g., Iberia).

== Autosomal DNA ==
During the early period of the Holocene, in 9000 BP, Khoisan-related peoples admixed with the ancestors of the Igbo people, possibly in the western Sahara.

Between 2000 BP and 1500 BP, Nilo-Saharan-speakers may have migrated across the Sahel, from East Africa into West Africa, and admixed with Niger-Congo-speaking Berom people. In 710 CE, West African-related populations (e.g., Niger-Congo-speaking Berom people, Bantu-speakers) and East African-related populations (Nilo-Saharan-speaking Ethiopians, Nilo-Saharan-speaking Chadians) admixed with one another in northern Nigeria and northern Cameroon.

Fan et al. (2019) found that the Fulani people show genetic affinity to isolated Afroasiatic-speaking groups in Eastern Africa, specifically Omotic-speakers such as the Aari people. While the Fulani have nearly exclusive indigenous African ancestry (defined by West and East African ancestry), they also show traces of West-Eurasian-like admixture, supporting an ancestral homeland somewhere in North or Eastern Africa, and westwards expansion during the Neolithic, possibly caused by the arrival and expansion of West-Eurasian-related groups. Fan et al. (2023) found that the Fulani, who have 50% Amhara-related and 50% Tikari-related ancestry as well as occupy regions such as West Africa, Central Africa, and the Sudan as nomadic herders, may have initially been Afroasiatic speakers that subsequently underwent language replacement and became Niger-Congo speakers.

== Medical DNA ==
The genomes of Africans commonly found to undergo adaptation are regulatory DNA, and many cases of adaptation found among Africans relate to diet, physiology, and evolutionary pressures from pathogens. Throughout Sub-Saharan Africa, genetic adaptation (e.g., rs334 mutation, Duffy blood group, increased rates of G6PD deficiency, sickle cell disease) to malaria has been found among Sub-Saharan Africans, which may have initially developed in 7300 BP. Sub-Saharan Africans have more than 90% of the Duffy-null genotype.

=== Pediculus ===
During the Copper Age and early Islamic era of ancient Israel, West Africans may have migrated into ancient Israel and introduced head louse from West Africa.

=== Sickle Cell ===
Amid the Green Sahara, the mutation for sickle cell originated in the Sahara or in the northwest forest region of western Central Africa (e.g., Cameroon) by at least 7,300 years ago, though possibly as early as 22,000 years ago. The ancestral sickle cell haplotype to modern haplotypes (e.g., Cameroon/Central African Republic and Benin/Senegal haplotypes) may have first arose in the ancestors of modern West Africans, bearing haplogroups E1b1a1-L485 and E1b1a1-U175 or their ancestral haplogroup E1b1a1-M4732. West Africans (e.g., Yoruba and Esan of Nigeria), bearing the Benin sickle cell haplotype, may have migrated through the northeastern region of Africa into the western region of Arabia. West Africans (e.g., Mende of Sierra Leone), bearing the Senegal sickle cell haplotype, may have migrated into Mauritania (77% modern rate of occurrence) and Senegal (100%); they may also have migrated across the Sahara, into North Africa, and from North Africa, into Southern Europe, Turkey, and a region near northern Iraq and southern Turkey. Some may have migrated into and introduced the Senegal and Benin sickle cell haplotypes into Basra, Iraq, where both occur equally. West Africans, bearing the Benin sickle cell haplotype, may have migrated into the northern region of Iraq (69.5%), Jordan (80%), Lebanon (73%), Oman (52.1%), and Egypt (80.8%).

=== Schistosomes ===
According to Steverding (2020), while not definite: Near the African Great Lakes, schistosomes (e.g., S. mansoni, S. haematobium) underwent evolution. Subsequently, there was an expansion alongside the Nile. From Egypt, the presence of schistosomes may have expanded, via migratory Yoruba people, into Western Africa. Thereafter, schistosomes may have expanded, via migratory Bantu peoples, into the rest of Sub-Saharan Africa (e.g., Southern Africa, Central Africa).

=== Thalassemia ===
Through pathways taken by caravans, or via travel amid the Almovarid period, a population (e.g., Sub-Saharan West Africans) may have introduced the –29 (A → G) β-thalassemia mutation (found in notable amounts among African Americans) into the North African region of Morocco.

== Domesticated animal DNA ==
While the Niger-Congo migration may have been from West Africa into Kordofan, possibly from Kordofan, Sudan, Niger-Congo speakers accompanied by undomesticated helmeted guineafowls, may have traversed into West Africa, domesticated the helmeted guineafowls by 3000 BCE, and via the Bantu expansion, traversed into other parts of Sub-Saharan Africa (e.g., Central Africa, East Africa, Southern Africa).
