= Genetic history of Africa =

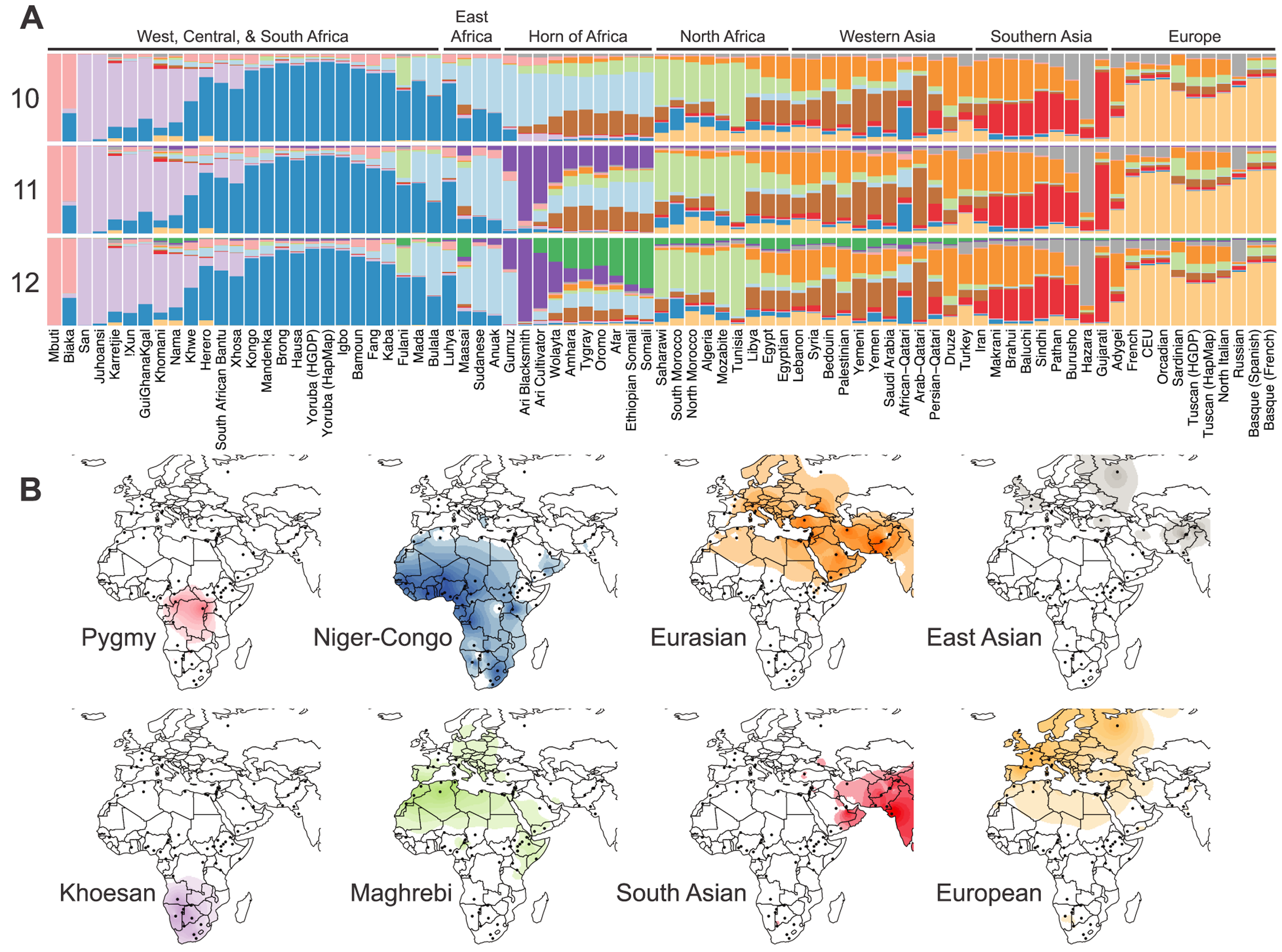
Population structure of African populations in a broad context. ADMIXTURE analysis of 2,194 individuals from 81 populations for 16,420 SNPs reveals both well-established and novel ancestry components in African populations.

The genetic history of Africa summarizes the genetic makeup and population history of Africans in living on the African continent, including the recent origin of modern humans in Africa, as well as the regional genetic histories of Africa's generally recognized subdivisions: North Africa, West Africa, East Africa, Central Africa, and Southern Africa.

The genetic history of Africa has been influenced by the various migrations, modes of economy, and social practices of its peoples; as well as by major historical events. In addition, various major geographical features of the continent have influenced Africans' genetic history, with the Sahara famously serving as both a trans-regional passageway and place of dwelling for people in Africa during various humid phases and periods throughout the history of Africa; as well as a physical barrier restricting (but not preventing) geneflow between the northernmost and Sub-Saharan parts of the continent.

== Overview ==
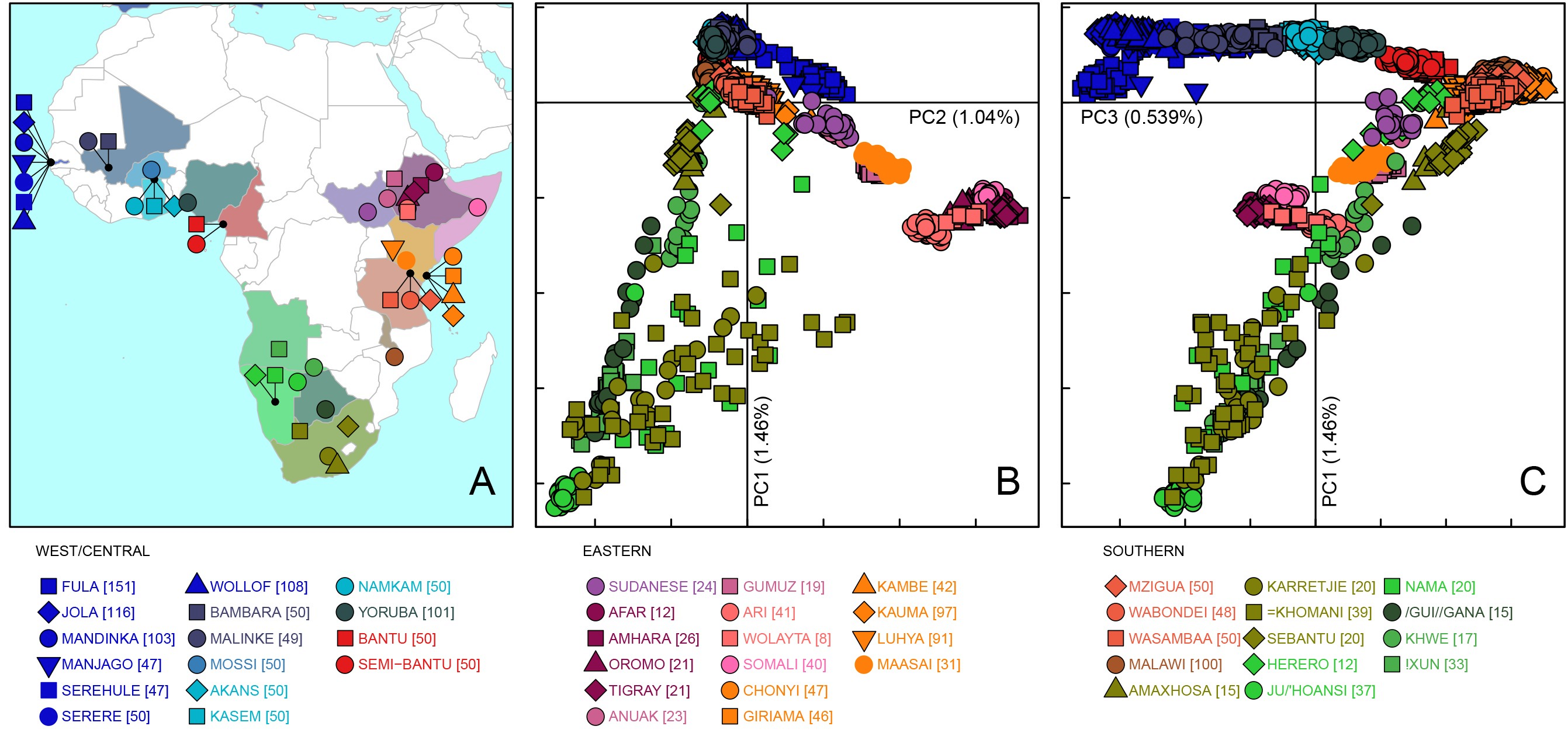
(A) the origin of the 46 African ethnic groups used in the analysis; ethnic groups from similar regions are given the same colour, but different shapes. B PCA shows that the first major axis of variation in Africa (PC1, y-axis) splits southern groups from the rest of Africa, each symbol represents an individual; PC2 (x-axis) reflects ethno-linguistic differences, with Niger-Congo and Nilo-Saharan speakers split from Afroasiatic speakers. C The third principal component (PC3, x-axis) represents geographical separation of Niger-Congo speakers, forming a cline from west to east Africans.

The peoples of Africa are characterized by regional genetic substructure and heterogeneity, reflecting to some degree respective ethno-linguistic identity, and, in part, explainable by the "multiregional evolution" of modern human lineages in various multiple regions of the African continent, as well as later admixture events, including back-migrations from Eurasia, of both highly differentiated West and East Eurasian components.

According to a 2017 study, Africa's genetic structure is largely partitioned by geography and language family, with populations belonging to the same ethno-linguistic groupings showing high genetic homogeneity and coherence. Gene flow, consistent with both short- and long-range migration events followed by extensive admixture and bottleneck events, have influenced the regional genetic makeup and demographic structure of Africans. The historical Bantu expansion had lasting impacts on the modern demographic make up of Africa, resulting in a greater genetic and linguistic homogenization.

Overall, different African populations display genetic diversity and substructure, but can be clustered in distinct but partially overlapping groupings:

- Khoisan or 'South African hunter-gatherers' from Southern Africa represented by the Khoisan peoples; they are associated with the deepest divergence (c. 270,000 years ago) of human genetic diversity, forming a distinct cluster of their own. They subsequently diverged into a Northern and Southern subgroup, c. 30,000 years ago. (Note: The lineage leading to the Khoe-San is basal to all other human lineages with an estimated divergence time of 300–200 kya (e.g., the Ju|'Hoan with the lowest level of recent admixture diverged ~270 ± 12 kya).)
- 'Central African hunter-gatherers' or 'Rain forest hunter-gatherers' (Pygmies) of Central Africa, represented by the Biaka and Mbuti; associated with another deep divergence (c. 220,000 years ago). They subsequently diverged into an Eastern and Western subgroup, c. 20,000 years ago. (Note: Subsequently, the Mbuti (RHG) diverged ~220 ± 10 kya from all other human lineages, forming a second basal lineage (Schlebusch et al. 2020) (fig. 1).)
- "Ancestral Eurasians" represent the ancestral population of modern Eurasians shortly before the Out-of-Africa expansion; they are inferred to have diverged from other African populations, most likely somewhere in Northeast Africa, c. 70,000 years ago.
- The various Afroasiatic-speakers from Northern Africa and the Horn of Africa, are suggested to have diverged from other African groups c. 50,000 years ago, but currently insufficient data and geneflow from other groups complicate an accurate estimation of the divergence date. Afroasiatic-speaking populations also display variable amounts of West Asian (primarily Natufian-like, but also Neolithic Anatolian and Iranian) admixtures from Eurasian backflow movements, with the remainder being primarily from autochthonous African genetic clusters, associated with Nilotic-like ancestry. They also display affinity for the Paleolithic North African Taforalt specimens of the Iberomaurusian culture. (Note: First, present-day ancestry in North Africans is characterized by an autochthonous Maghrebi component related to a Paleolithic back migration to Africa from Eurasia. ... This result suggests that Iberomaurusian populations in North Africa were related to Paleolithic people in the Levant, but also that migrations of sub-Saharan African origin reached the Maghreb during the Pleistocene. ... This result is consistent with our previous finding that Cushitic ancestry formed by admixture between Nilo-Saharan and Arabian ancestries39. ... While these findings show that a Levant-Neolithic-related population made a critical contribution to the ancestry of present-day eastern Africans (Lazaridis et al., 2016), present-day Cushitic speakers such as the Somali cannot be fit simply as having Tanzania_Luxmanda_3100BP ancestry. The best fitting model for the Somali includes Tanzania_Luxmanda_3100BP ancestry, Dinka-related ancestry, and 16% ± 3% Iranian-Neolithic-related ancestry (p = 0.015). This suggests that ancestry related to the Iranian Neolithic appeared in eastern Africa after earlier gene flow related to Levant Neolithic populations, a scenario that is made more plausible by the genetic evidence of admixture of Iranian-Neolithic-related ancestry throughout the Levant by the time of the Bronze Age (Lazaridis et al., 2016) and in ancient Egypt by the Iron Age (Schuenemann et al., 2017).)
- 'Eastern African hunter-gatherers', represented by Hadza, Sandawe, Omotic-speakers, and the ancient Mota specimen; their phylogenetic relationship to other populations is not clear, but they display affinity to modern East and West African populations, and harbor Khoesan-like geneflow along a Northeast to Southwest cline, as well as later (West) Eurasian admixtures, but at lower amounts than among Afroasiatic-speakers. (Note: This could either suggest deep population structure with EAHG and southern hunter–gatherer groups tracing some of their ancestries to a basal central African RHG lineage (Lipson et al. 2020, 2022) or gene flow between southern African and central African foragers, as indicated by a distinct allele-sharing pattern between the !Xun/Ju|'Hoan and Mbuti (Scheinfeldt et al. 2019; Bergström et al. 2020; Schlebusch et al. 2020). ... Currently, insufficient data exist to estimate the (even older) Eastern African-Omotic divergence time.)
- "Ancient East Africans" or "Ancestral West/East Africans" associated with the common ancestor of modern Niger-Congo and Nilo-Saharan-speakers originated around 28,000 years ago, likely in the Nile Valley region. They subsequently diverged at c. 18,000 years ago into the ancestors of West and West-Central African Niger-Congo and Bantu-speakers, and into the East African Nilo-Saharan/Nilotic-speakers. They represent the dominant and most widespreaded ancestry component of modern Africa, and are associated with relative recent population expansions linked to agriculture and pastoralist lifestyles. Genetic data indicates affinity for older hunter-gatherer groups in East Africa, but their exact relationship remains unclear. (Note: For the pair of Western and West-Central African ancestries, the point estimate of divergence time was 6,900 years ago. ... Western Africa ancestry is the predominant ancestry among populations from the area around Senegal and the Gambia whereas West-Central African ancestry predominates among populations from the area around Nigeria. ... Comparing two Mandenka and one Gambian to two Esan and one Yoruba, the split time was estimated to be <4,600 years ago, which is expected to be an underestimate compared to the FST-based time because of the presence of 0–11.1% West-Central African ancestry in the Western Africans and 26.7–35.0% Western African ancestry in the West-Central Africans. ... In turn, Eastern African ancestry, which is characteristic of modern Nilotes, and the common ancestor of Western and West-Central African ancestries derived from a common ancestor 18,000 years ago based on decomposition of FST or <13,800 years ago based on msmc analysis of two Dinka compared to either one Gambian and one Mandenka or two Esan. The latter time is relatively underestimated because of the presence of 22.6–26.1% Western or West-Central African ancestry in the Eastern Africans. This common ancestor probably existed in the Nile Valley. ... Currently, insufficient data exist to estimate the (even older) Eastern African-Omotic divergence time.) There is evidence for limited geneflow (9–13%) from a human ghost lineage, referred to as 'West African foragers' with a deeper or equally deep divergence time than 'Khoisan hunter-gatherers', into modern West Africans.
- Austronesian-speaking Malagasy people in Madagascar have received significant East/Southeast Asian admixture associated with the Austronesian expansion, with the remainder ancestry being primarily associated with West-Central and East African components. The estimated date of geneflow between these sources is c. 2,200 years ago.

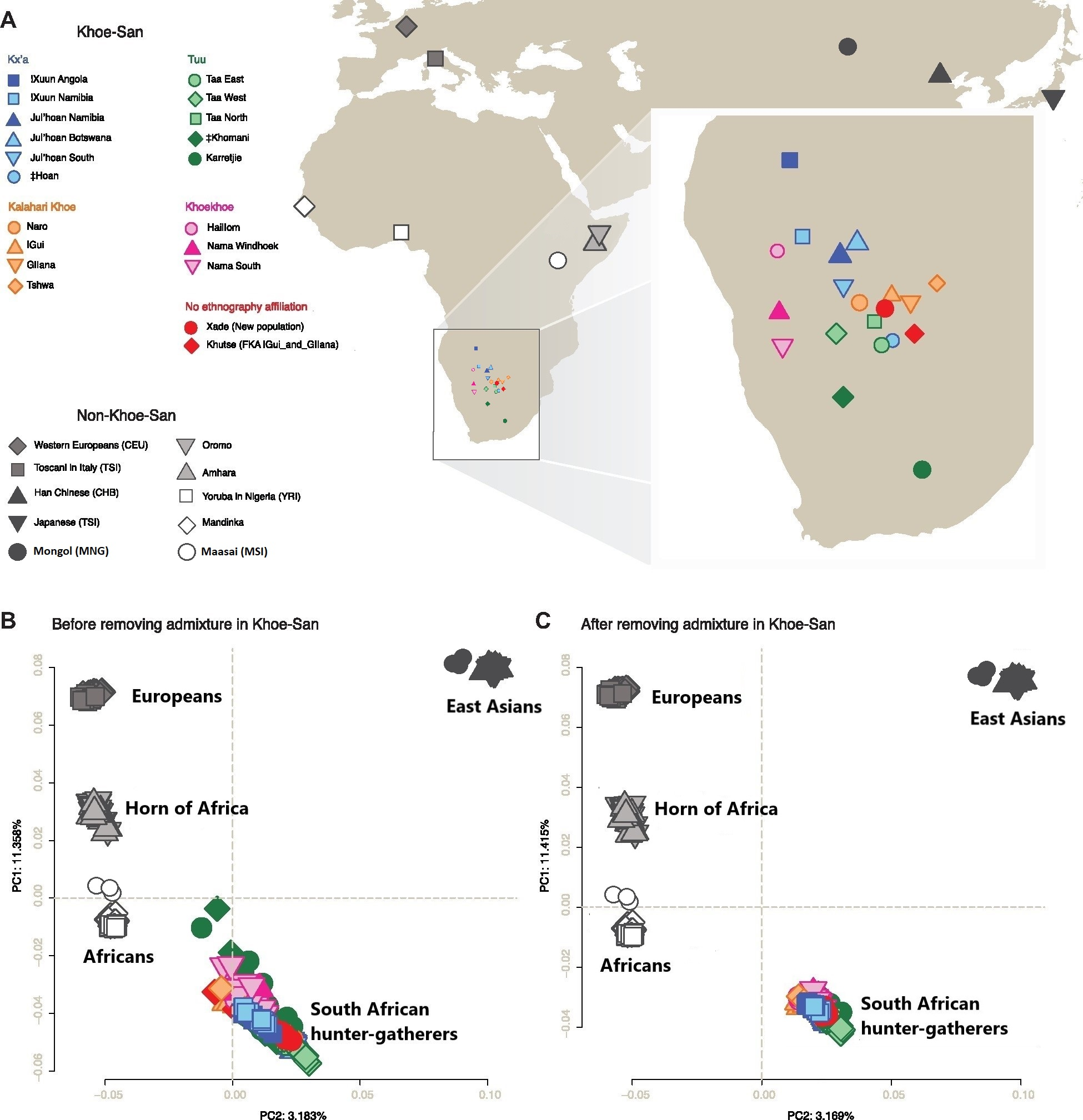
Geographic location of the samples analyzed in this study A. PCA of the Khoe-San individuals, Eurasians, West and East Africans before (unmasked, B) and after (masked, C) applying the local ancestry pipeline (146,696 independent SNPs).

=== Out-of-Africa event ===
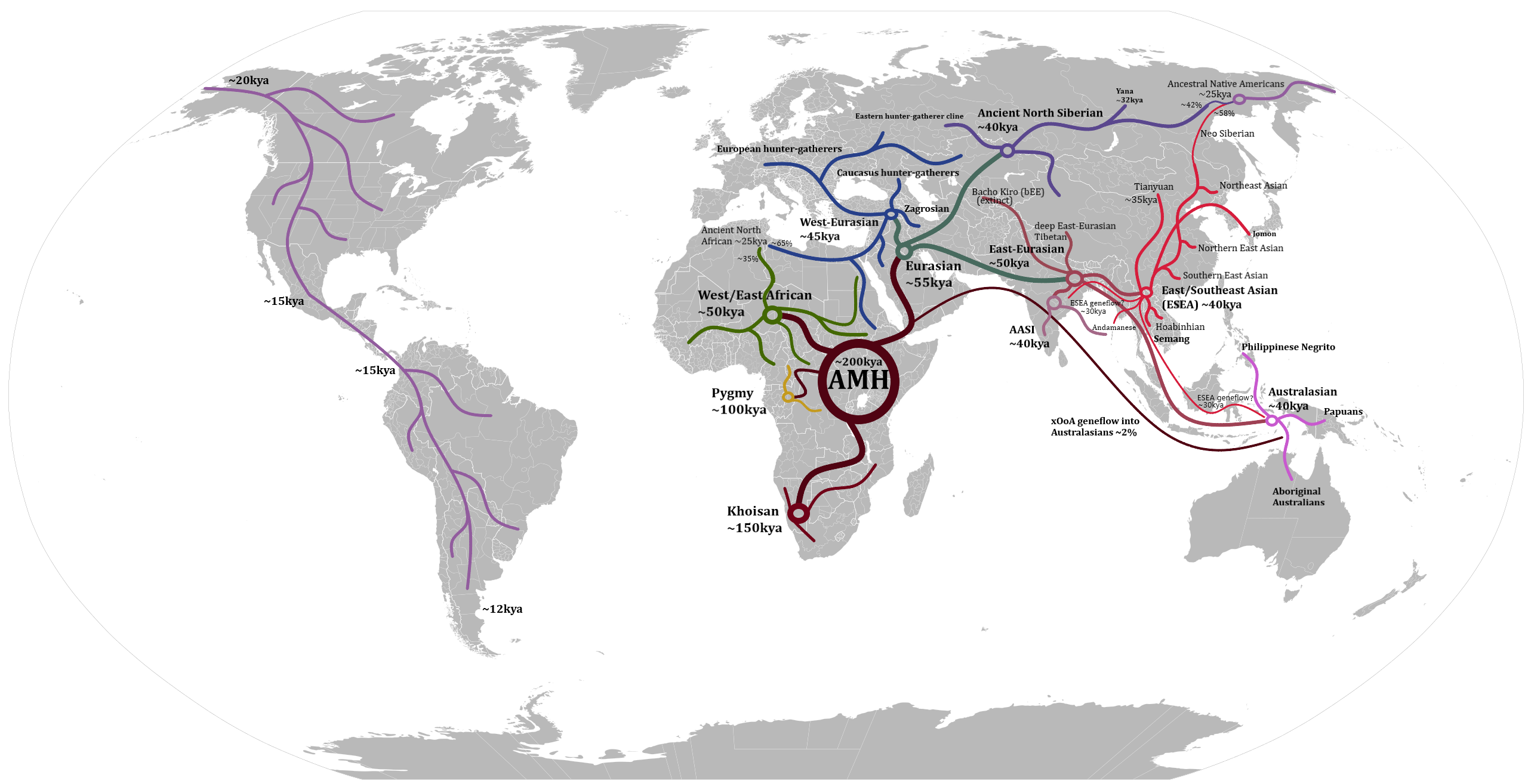
Human migration routes following Out-of-Africa.

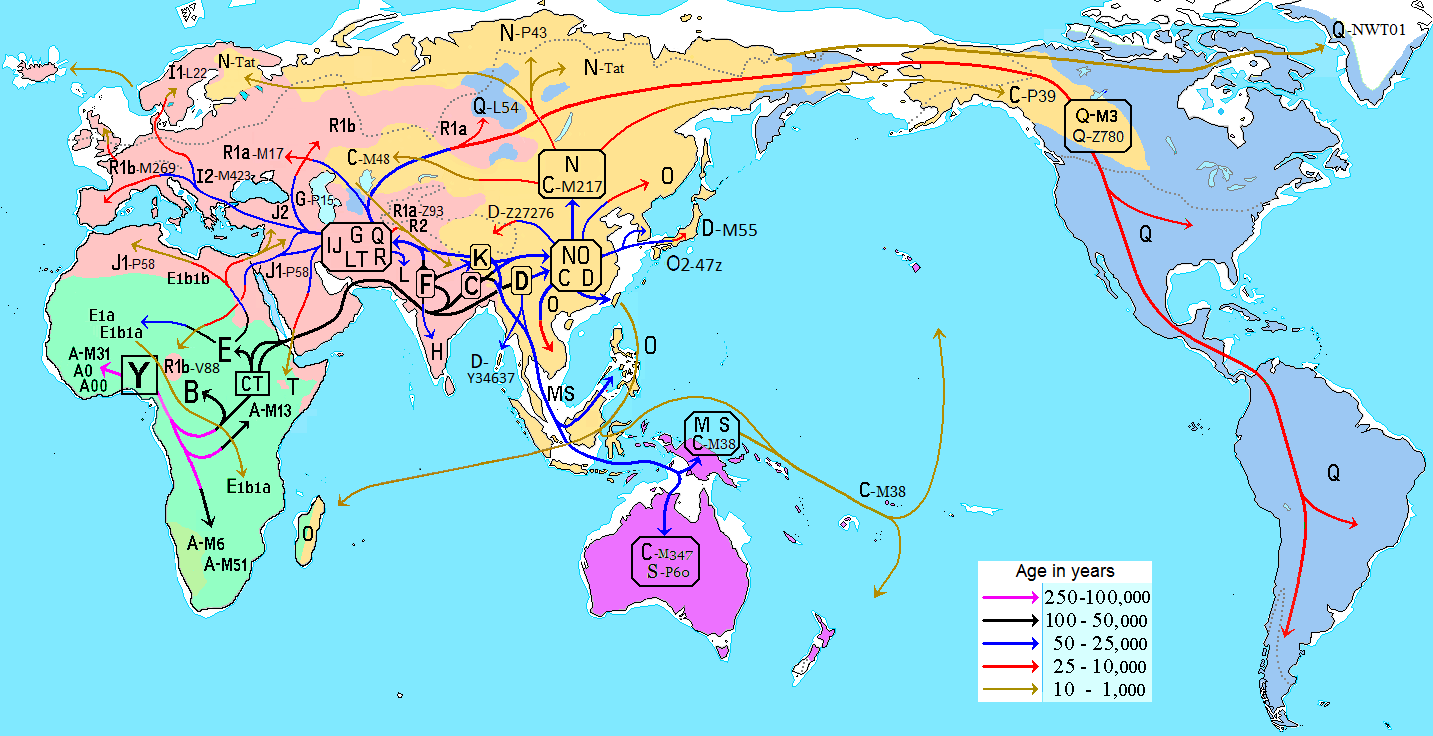
Most modern Africans display a high level of genetic homogeneity, but contributions from Eurasian populations are substantial, mostly concentrated in the Northeastern part of Africa and Madagascar.

The "recent African origin" model proposes that all modern non-African populations descend from one or several waves of H. sapiens that left Africa 70,000–60,000 years ago. Notably, recent genetic and archeologic data suggests that H. sapiens originated from interactions in multiple regions of Africa, instead of emerging from a singular sub-region, as descendants of the last common ancestor of all modern humans expanded into, absorbed, and/or replaced various other deep lineages (described as "archaic"). The H. sapiens ancestral to non-Africans would have most likely left Northeastern Africa.

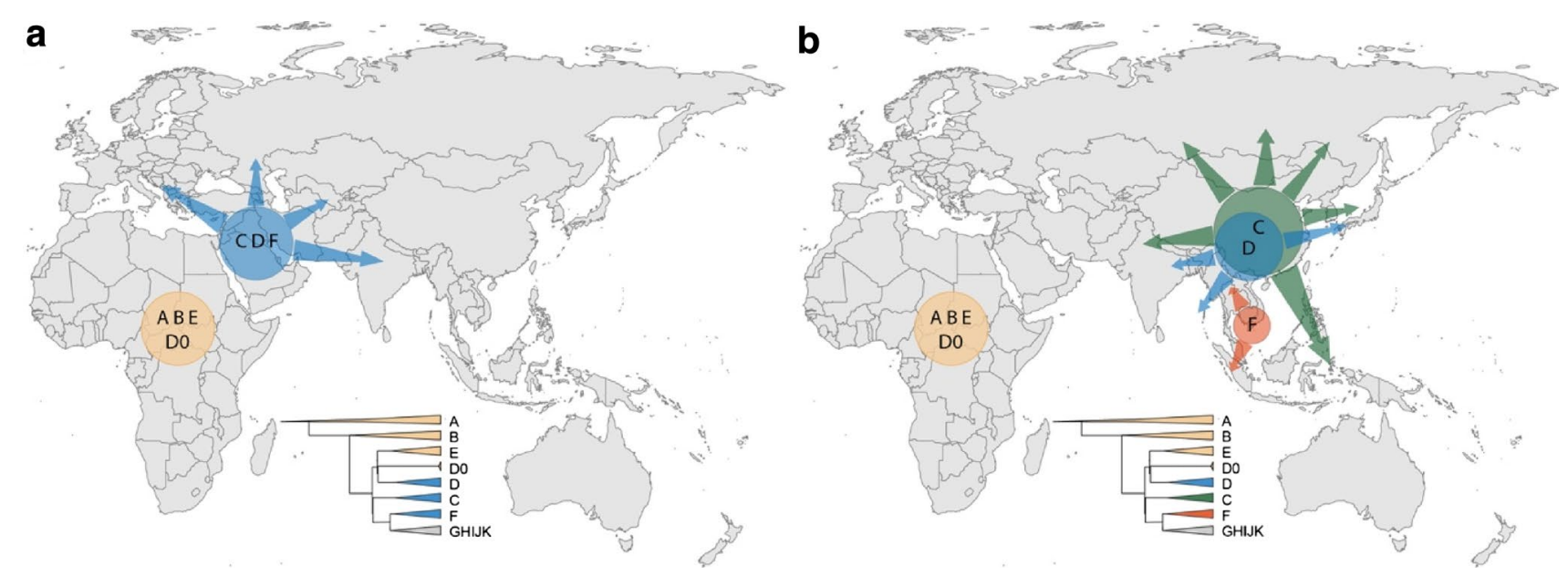
According to serial founder model, the earliest-branching non-African lineages are expected to have expanded in the Middle East, after the Out-of-Africa event A, but have their deepest divergence in modern-day East or Southeast Asia B, suggesting either rapid diversification and substructure within the early Eurasians, or replacement and loss of deep lineages in Western Eurasia. Simplified Y tree is shown as reference for colours.

=== Admixture events with archaic hominins ===
According to Durvasula et al. (2020), there are indications that 2% to 19% (≃6.6 to 7.0%) of the DNA of West African populations may have come from an unknown archaic hominin which split from the ancestor of humans and Neanderthals between 360 kya to 1.02 mya. However, Durvasula et al. (2020) also suggests that at least part of this archaic admixture is also present in Eurasians/non-Africans, and that the admixture event or events range from 0 to 124 ka B.P, which includes the period before the Out-of-Africa migration and prior to the African/Eurasian split (thus affecting in part the common ancestors of both Africans and Eurasians/non-Africans). Chen et al. (2020) found that Africans have higher Neanderthal ancestry than previously thought. 2,504 African samples from all over Africa were analyzed and tested on Neanderthal ancestry. All African samples showed evidence for minor Neanderthal ancestry, but always at lower levels than observed in Eurasians.

=== Geneflow between Eurasian and African populations ===
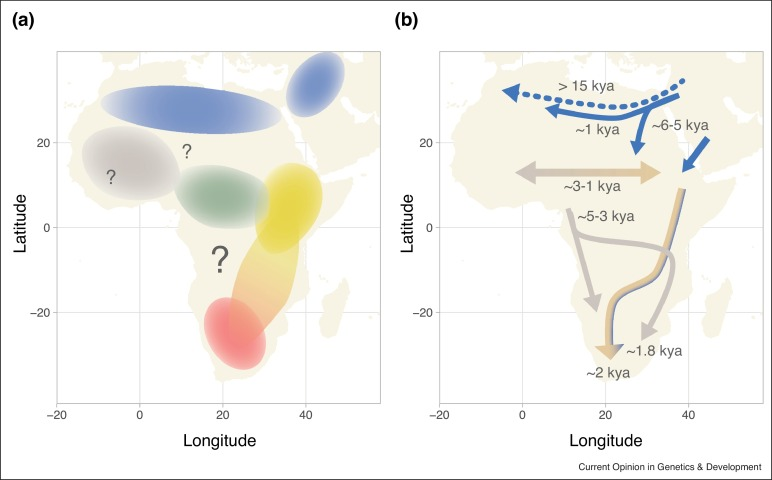
Pre-Neolithic and Neolithic migration events in Africa.

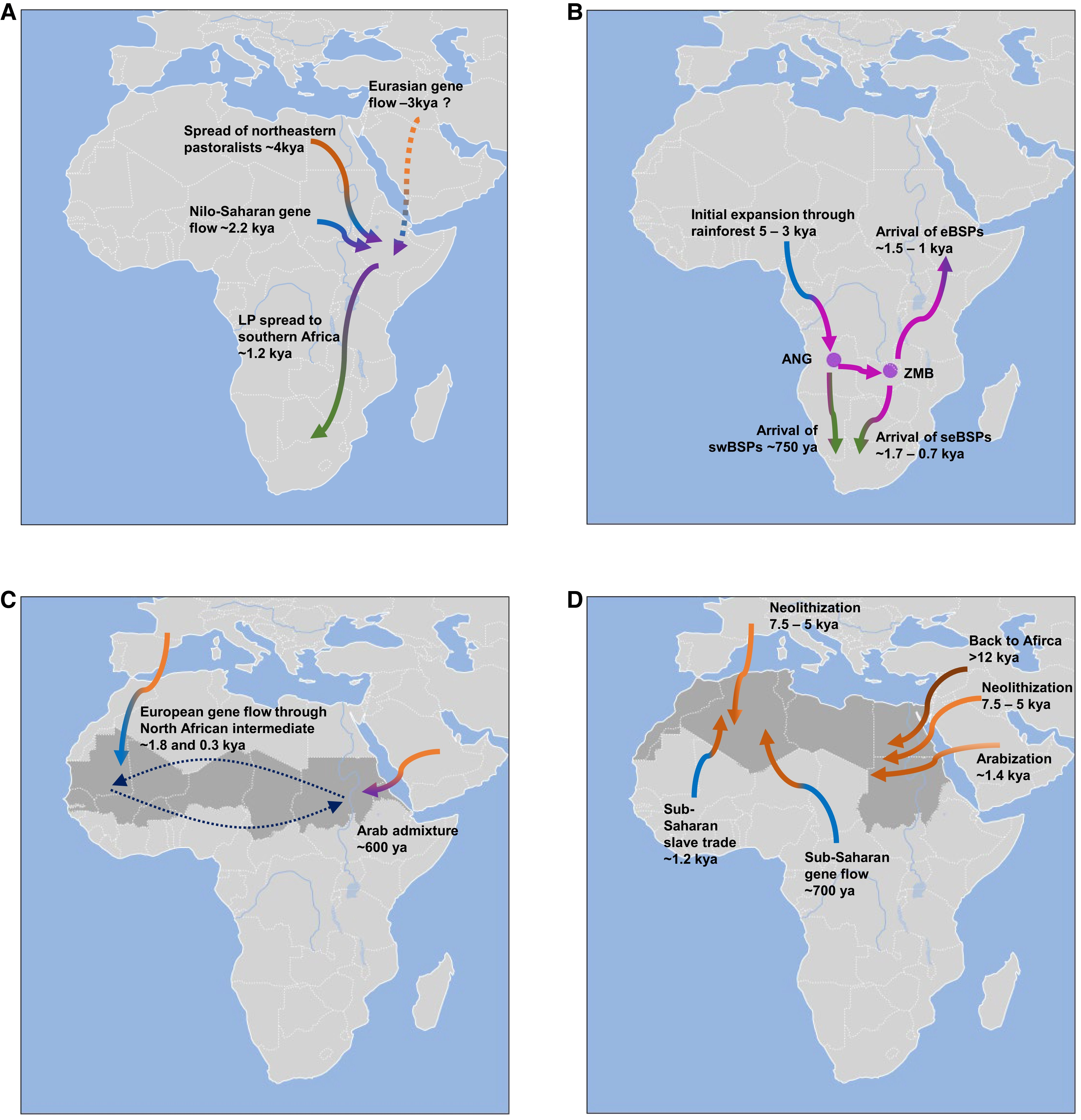
A visual summary of the main admixture movements into and within Africa.

Significant Eurasian admixture is found in Northern Africa, and among specific ethnic groups of the Horn of Africa, Northern Sudan, the Sahel region, as well as among the Malagasy people of Madagascar. Various genome studies found evidence for multiple prehistoric back-migrations from various Eurasian populations and subsequent admixture with native groups. West Eurasian-associated geneflow arrived to Northern Africa during the Paleolithic (30,000 to 15,000 years ago), followed by other pre-Neolithic and Neolithic migration events. Genetic data on the Taforalt samples "demonstrated that Northern Africa received significant amounts of gene-flow from Eurasia predating the Holocene and development of farming practices". Medieval geneflow events, such as the Arab expansion also left traces in various African populations. Pickrell et al. (2014) indicated that Western Eurasian ancestry eventually arrived through Northeast Africa (particularly the Horn of Africa) to Southeast Africa and Southern Africa.

Ramsay et al. (2018) also found evidence for significant Western Eurasian admixture in various parts of Africa, from both ancient and more recent migrations, being highest among populations from Northern Africa, and some groups of the Horn of Africa:

In addition to the intrinsic diversity within the continent due to population structure and isolation, migration of Eurasian populations into Africa has emerged as a critical contributor to the genetic diversity. These migrations involved the influx of different Eurasian populations at different times and to different parts of Africa. Comprehensive characterization of the details of these migrations through genetic studies on existing populations could help to explain the strong genetic differences between some geographically neighbouring populations.

This distinctive Eurasian admixture appears to have occurred over at least three time periods with ancient admixture in central west Africa (e.g., Yoruba from Nigeria) occurring between ~7.5 and 10.5 kya, older admixture in east Africa (e.g., Ethiopia) occurring between ~2.4 and 3.2 kya and more recent admixture between ~0.15 and 1.5 kya in some east African (e.g., Kenyan) populations.

Subsequent studies based on LD decay and haplotype sharing in an extensive set of African and Eurasian populations confirmed the presence of Eurasian signatures in west, east and southern Africans. In the west, in addition to Niger-Congo speakers from The Gambia and Mali, the Mossi from Burkina Faso showed the oldest Eurasian admixture event ~7 kya. In the east, these analyses inferred Eurasian admixture within the last 4000 years in Kenya.

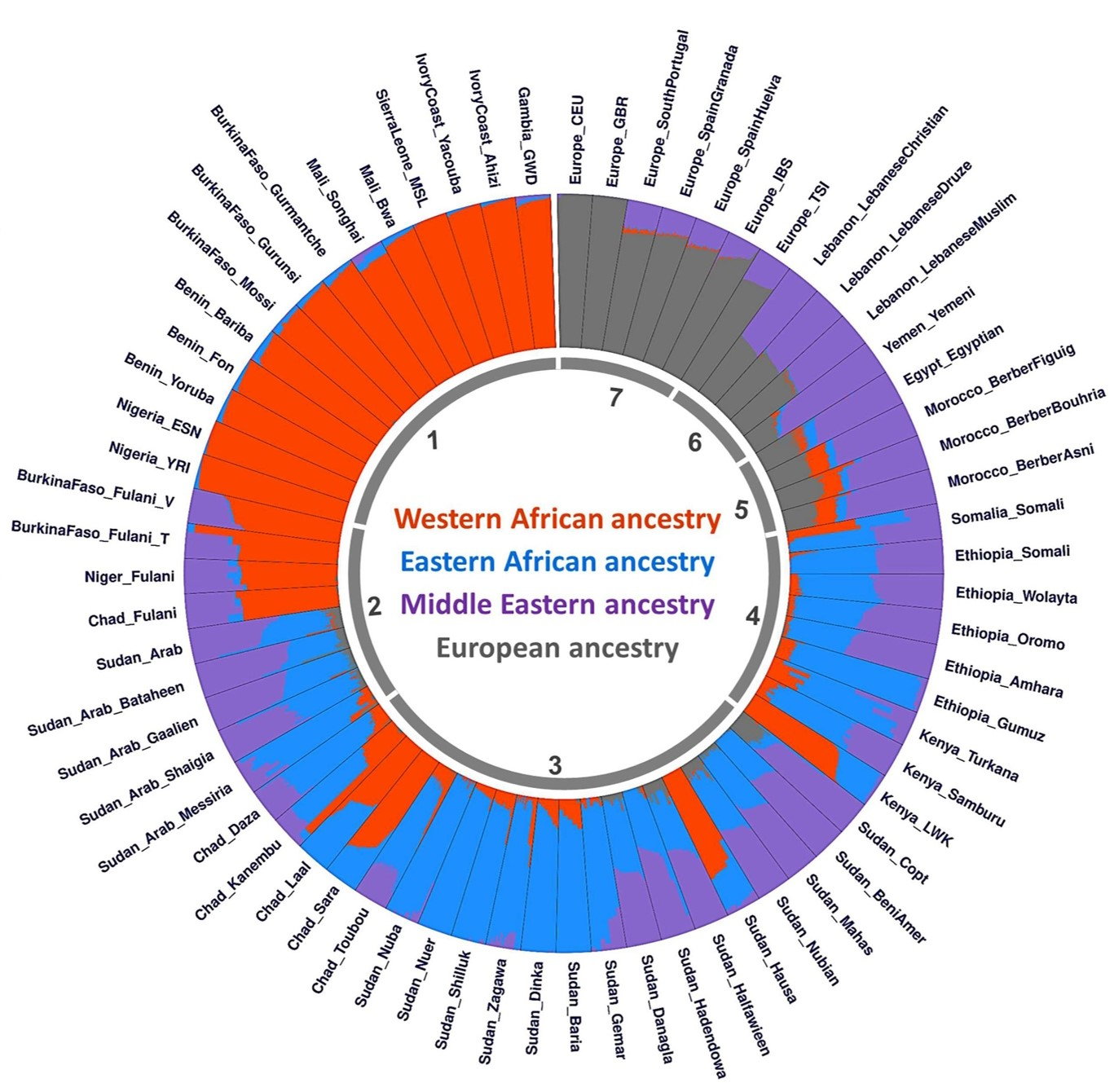
Ancestral components of various human populations using a four-way Admixture model. European and Middle Eastern (Western Eurasian) ancestry is found in many African groups.

There is no definitive agreement on when or where the original homeland of the Afroasiatic language family existed. Some have suggested that they were spread by people with largely West-Eurasian ancestry during the Neolithic Revolution, towards Northern Africa and the Horn of Africa, outgoing from the Middle East, specifically from the Levant. Others argue that the first speakers of Proto-Afroasiatic were based in Northeast Africa because that region includes the majority of the diversity of the Afroasiatic language family and has very diverse groups in close geographic proximity, which is sometimes considered a telltale sign for a linguistic geographic origin. A subset of the Proto-Afroasiatic population would have migrated to the Levant during the late Paleolithic, merging with local West-Eurasians and resulting in a population which would later give rise to Natufian culture, associated with the early development of agriculture and early Afroasiatic languages, or specifically pre-proto-Semitic. In addition, Y-haplogroup sub-lineage E-M215 (also known as "E1b1b) and its derivative E-M35 are quite common among Afroasiatic speakers, and southwestern Ethiopia is a plausible source of these haplogroups. Under this African model, the linguistic group and carriers of this lineage would have arisen and dispersed together from Northeast Africa in the Mesolithic, plausibly having already developed subsistence patterns of pastoralism and intensive plant usage and collection.

The Near-Eastern agriculturalist hypothesis does not account for the domestication of plants endemic to the Horn of Africa such as teff, ensete, and Niger seed, nor does it account for the lack of evidence of intrusive agricultural populations or for the growing of wheat, barley, or sorghum in that region prior to 3000 B.C. According to historian and linguist Christopher Ehret, the form of intensive plant collection practiced by the Proto-Afroasiatic population in Northeast Africa may have been a precursor to the other agricultural practices that would later independently develop in the Fertile Crescent and the Horn of Africa.

David Schoenbrun, Christopher Ehret, Steven A. Brandt and Shomarka Keita (2025) have highlighted the problematic categorisation of genetic haplogroups characterised as ‘African’ and ‘Eurasian' in North African genome studies. In reference to the van de Loosdrecht et al. 2018 study on the epipalaeolithic Taforalt remains from Morocco, which identified the EM35 (primarily EM78) common in north-eastern Africa but characterised the mtDNA (female lineage haplogroups) of U6 and M1 as 'Eurasian', the authors questioned the classification of these maternal haplogroups despite their localised and long-established presence in ancient African populations. In their view, identifying a range of African populations may still remain an issue “since the idea of ‘African’ still gets stereotyped or restricted. (Accepting the southwestern Asian/Levantine geographical continuity with Africa eliminates a conceptual barrier related to racio-typological thinking permitting an Africasian construct analogous to Eurasian.)”.

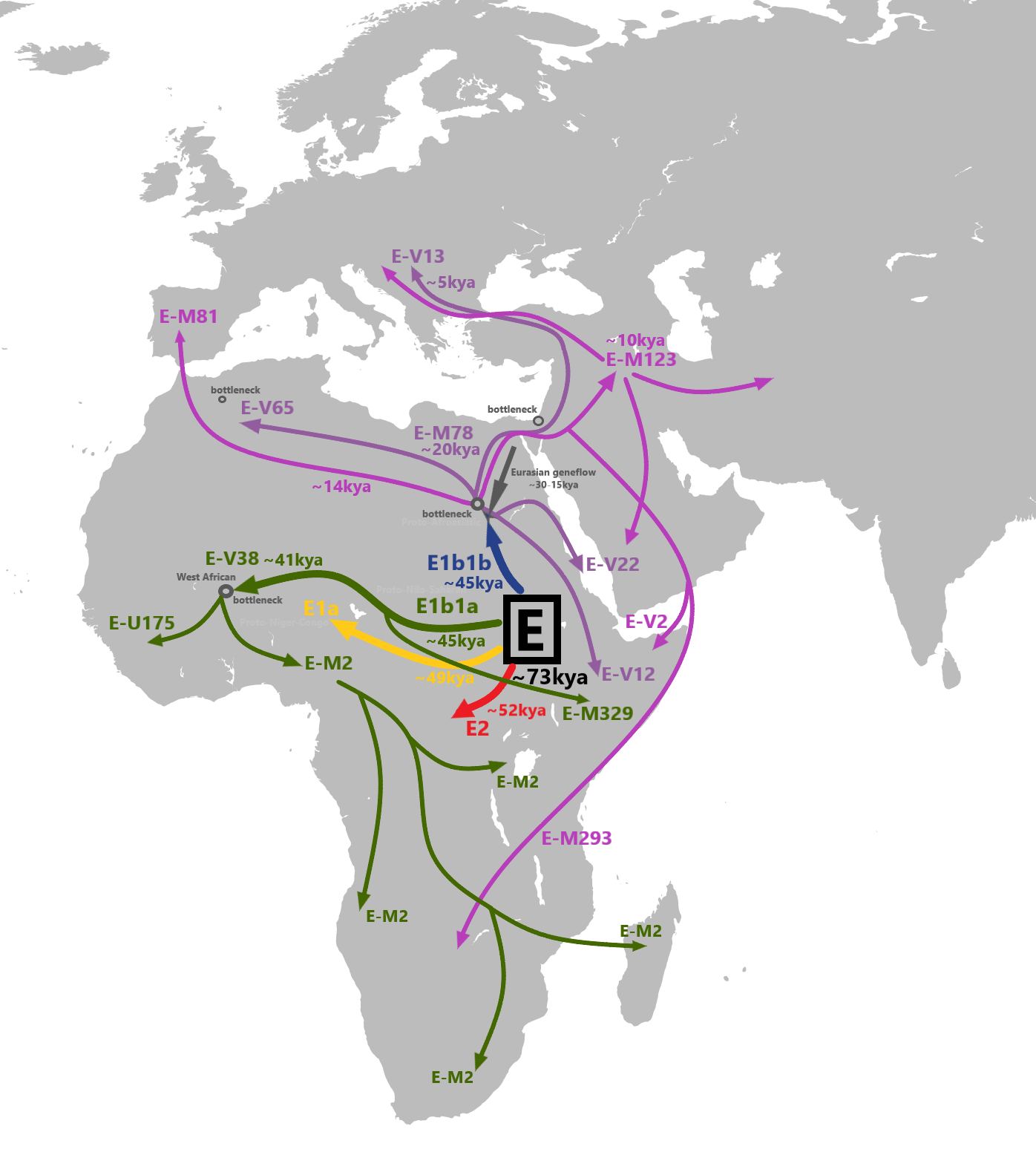
Proposed migration routes of paternal lineage E.

==== Horn of Africa ====
While many studies conducted on Horn of Africa populations estimate a West-Eurasian admixture event around 3,000 years ago, Hodgson et al. (2014) found a distinct West-Eurasian ancestral component among studied Afroasiatic-speaking groups in the Horn of Africa (and to a lesser extent in North Africa and West Asia), most prevalent among the ethnic Somali. This ancestral component dubbed "Ethio-Somali" is most closely related to the "Maghrebi" (peaking in Tunisians) component and is believed to have diverged from other non-African ancestries around 23,000 years ago, and migrated back to Africa prior to developing agriculture (12–23 ka) from the Near East. This population would have crossed via the Sinai Peninsula and then split into two, with one branch continuing west across North Africa and the other heading south into the Horn of Africa. The authors propose that the "Ethio-Somali" component may have been a substantial ancestral component of the Proto-Afroasiatic-speaking population. Later migration from Arabia into the HOA beginning around 3 ka would explain the origin of the Ethiosemitic languages at this time. An mtDNA analysis by Gandini et al. (2016) has produced additional evidence in support of a pre-agricultural back-migration from West-Eurasia into the Horn of Africa with an estimated date of arrival into the Horn of Africa in the early Holocene, possibly as a result of obsidian exchange networks across the Red Sea. Hodgson et al. also confirmed the existence of an ancestral component indigenous to the Horn of Africa - "Ethiopic" or "Omotic" (Pagani et al.) - which is most prevalent among speakers of the Omotic branch of Afroasiatic in southwestern Ethiopia. This lineage is associated with that of a 4,500 year-old fossil (Mota) found in a cave in southwestern Ethiopia, which has high genetic affinity to modern Ethiopian groups, especially the endogamous blacksmith caste of the Omotic Aari people. Like Mota, Aari blacksmiths do not show evidence for admixture with West-Eurasians, demonstrating a degree of population continuity in this region for at least 4,500 years. In a comparative analysis of Mota's genome referencing modern populations, Gallego et al. (2016) concluded that the divergence of Omotic from other Afroasiatic languages may have resulted from the relative isolation of its speakers from external groups.

Another 2004 mtDNA study featured samples from Gurna, Upper Egypt and clustered them together with the Ethiopian and Yemeni groups, in between the Near Eastern and other African sample groups.

The E-M35 haplogroup subclade is found among all Afro-Asiatic speaking regions, with the M-78 clade now commonly thought to have arisen in either Sudan or Egypt, "or further south in the northeastern quadrant of Africa".

In an analysis of 68 Ethiopian ethnic groups, Lopez et al. (2021) revealed that several groups belonging to the three AA classifications of Cushitic, Omotic and Semitic show high genetic similarity to each other on average. Furthermore, the Nilo-Saharan speakers in the southwest shared more recent ancestry with Bantu and Nilotics, in contrast Afro-Asiatic speakers in the northeast shared more recent ancestry with Egyptians and other West Eurasians. The data also supported widespread recent intermixing among various ethnic groups.

==== Madagascar ====
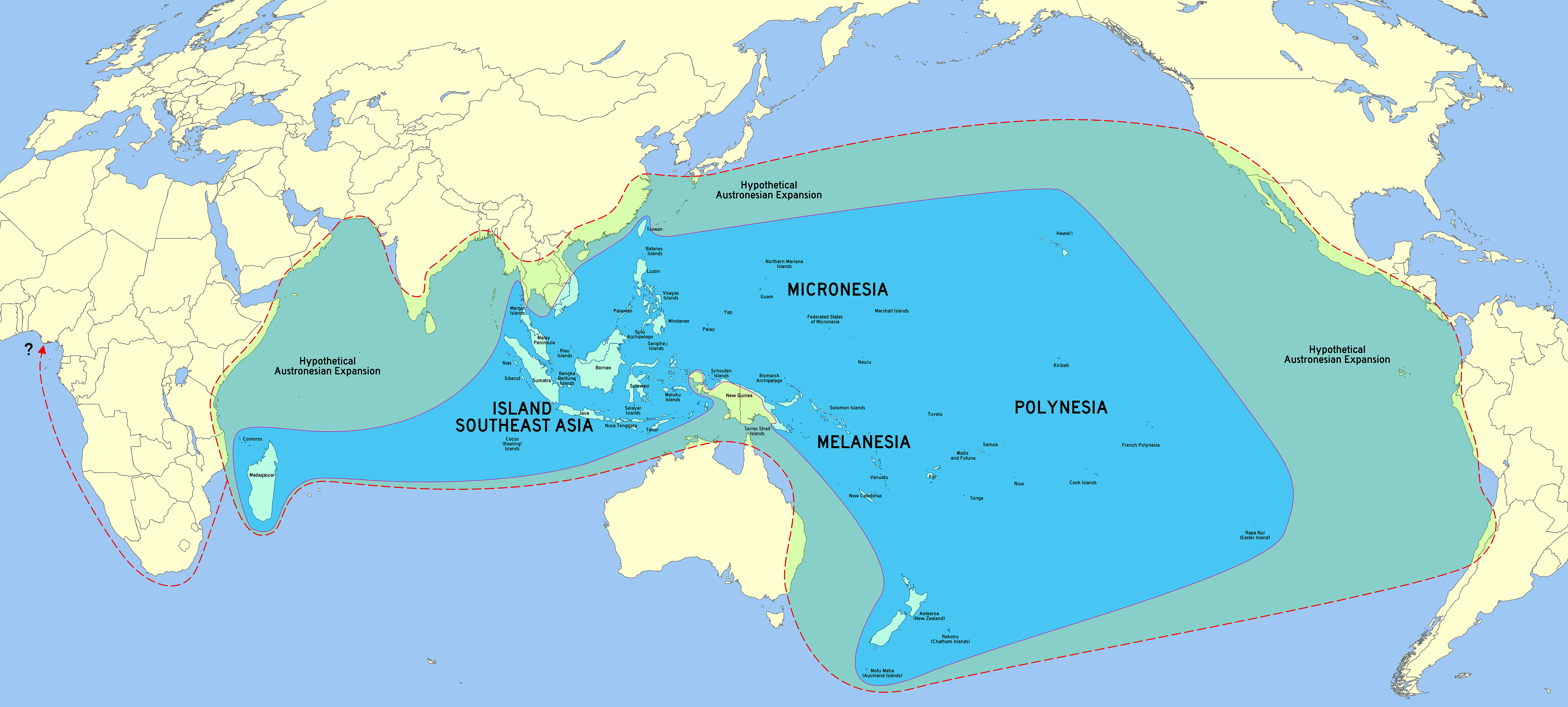
Austronesian expansion, outgoing from Taiwan and the northern Philippines.

Specific East Asian-related ancestry is found among the Malagasy speakers of Madagascar at a medium frequency. The presence of this East Asian-related ancestry is mostly linked to the Austronesian peoples expansion from Southeast Asia. The peoples of Borneo were identified to resemble the East Asian voyagers, who arrived on Madagascar. East Asian ancestry among Malagasy people was estimated at a mean average of 33%, but as high as ~75% among some Highlander groups and upper caste groups.

==== Northern Africa ====
Compiled genetic publications have identified a high frequency of E haplogroup subclades across Egypt, including among Egyptian Copts in Adaima, Upper Egypt and émigré Coptic communities in Sudan. Other haplogroups with a notable occurrence in the Egyptian populations have included the J and R haplogroups.

A 2005 study found that populations in Somalia, Sudan, Egypt and Oromos in Ethiopia shared the same Y chromosome haplogroup E3b1, defined by E-M78.

A 2005 genetic study found close affinities of eastern sub-Saharan populations with Egypt in the phylogenetic trees through analysis of the short DNA sequences. The authors suggested that the influential role of the Nile River served as a migratory route and an agent of genetic flow which contributed to present-day heterogeneity in Egypt.

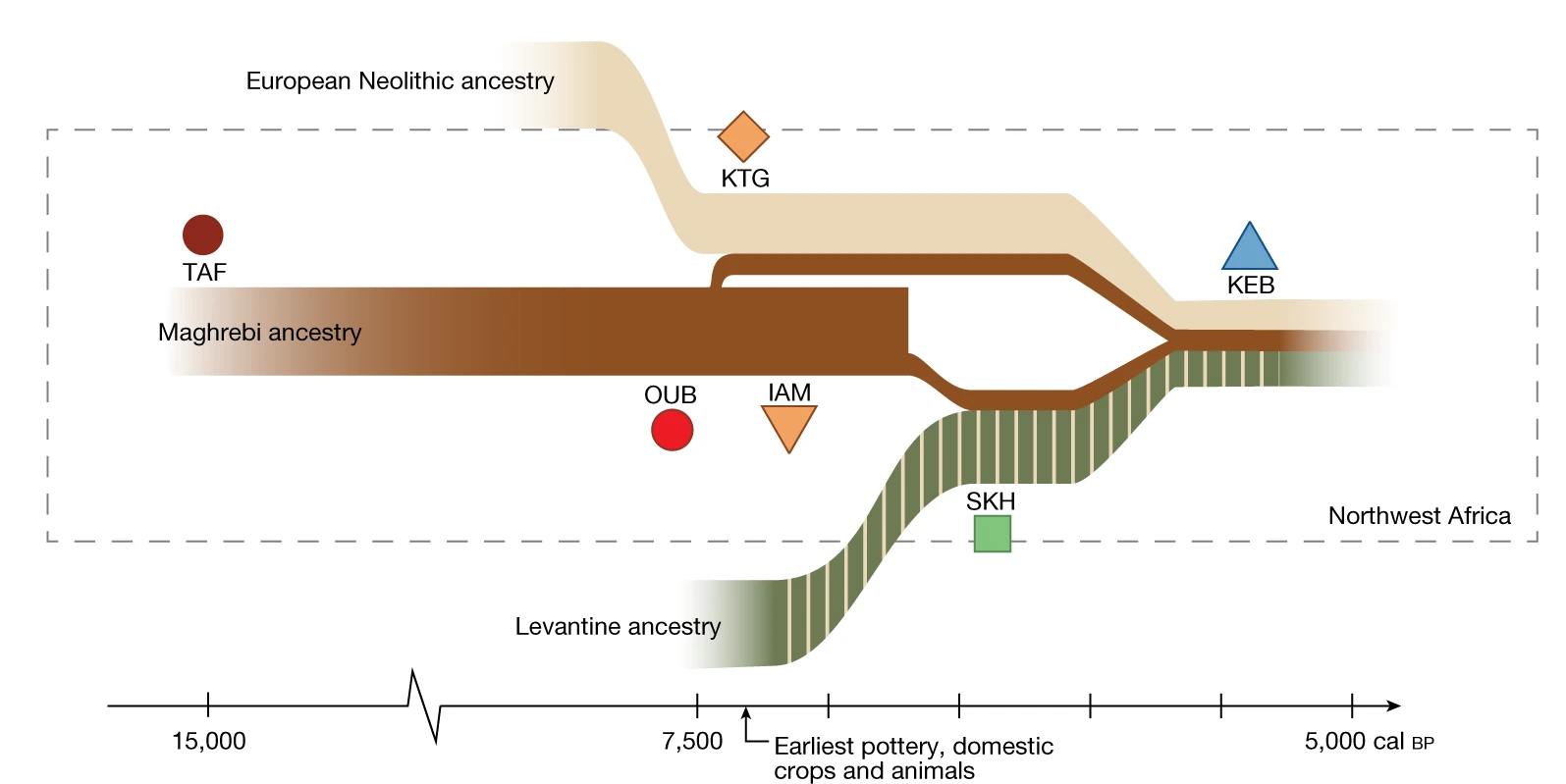
The neolithization of Northwestern Africa corresponded to the arrival of European migration circa 5500 BC (■), and a wave of Levantine migration circa 5000 BC (■), with some local admixture (■).

Dobon et al. (2015) identified an autosomal ancestral component that is commonly found among modern Afroasiatic-speaking populations (as well as Nubians) in Northeast Africa. This Coptic component peaks among Copts in Sudan, which is differentiated by its lack of Arab influence, but shares common ancestry with the North African/Middle Eastern populations. It appears alongside a component that defines Nilo-Saharan speakers of southwestern Sudan and South Sudan. Arauna et al. (2017), analyzing existing genetic data obtained from Northern African populations, such as Berbers, described them as a mosaic of North African (Taforalt), Middle Eastern, European (Early European Farmers), and Sub-Saharan African-related ancestries.

Chen et al. (2020) analyzed 2,504 African samples from all over Africa, and found archaic Neanderthal ancestry, among all tested African samples at low frequency. They also identified a European-related (West-Eurasian) ancestry segment, which seems to largely correspond with the detected Neanderthal ancestry components. European-related admixture among Africans was estimated to be between ~0% to up to ~30%, with a peak among Northern Africans. According to Chen et al. (2020), "These data are consistent with the hypothesis that back-migration contributed to the signal of Neanderthal ancestry in Africans. Furthermore, the data indicates that this back-migration came after the split of Europeans and East Asians, from a population related to the European lineage."

There is a minor geneflow from North Africa in parts of Southern Europe, this is supported by the presence of an African-specific mitochondrial haplogroup among one of four 4,000 year old samples. Multiple studies found also evidence for geneflow of African ancestry towards Eurasia, specifically Europe and the Middle East. The analysis of 40 different West-Eurasian populations found African admixture at a frequency of 0% to up to ~15%.

==== Western Africa ====
Hollfelder et al. (2021) concluded that West African Yoruba people, which were previously used as "unadmixed reference population" for indigenous Africans, harbor minor levels of Neanderthal ancestry, which can be largely associated with back-migration of an "Ancestral European-like" source population.

A genome-wide study of a Fulani community from Burkina Faso inferred two major admixture events in this group, dating to ~1800 ya, and 300 ya. The first admixture event took place between the West African ancestors of the Fula and ancestral North African nomadic groups. The second admixture event, relatively recent, inferred a source from Southwestern Europe, or suggests either an additional gene flow between the Fulani and Northern African groups, who carry admixture proportions from Europeans. Sahelian populations like the Toubou also showed admixture coming from Eurasians.

==== Southern Africa ====
Low levels of West Eurasian ancestry (European or Middle Eastern) are found in Khoe–Kwadi Khoesan-speakers. It could have been acquired indirectly by admixture with migrating pastoralists from East Africa. This hypothesis of gene flow from eastern to southern Africa is further supported by other genetic and archaeological data documenting the spread of pastoralism from East to South Africa.

== Regional genomic overview ==
=== North Africa ===
==== Archaic Human DNA ====
While Denisovan and Neanderthal ancestry in non-Africans outside of Africa are more certain, archaic human ancestry in Africans is less certain and is too early to be established with certainty.

==== Ancient DNA ====
Daniel Shriner (2018), using modern populations as a reference, showed that the Natufians carried 61.2% Arabian, 21.2% Northern African, 10.9% Western Asian, and a small portion of Eastern African ancestry at 6.8%, which is associated with the modern Omotic-speaking groups found in southern Ethiopia.

===== Egypt =====
Khnum-aa, Khnum-Nakht, Nakht-Ankh and JK2911 carried maternal haplogroup M1a1.

Djehutynakht (10A) carried maternal haplogroup U5b2b5. JK2888 carried maternal haplogroup U6a2.

Thuya, Tiye, Tutankhamen's mother, and Tutankhamen carried the maternal haplogroup K.

JK2134 carried maternal haplogroup J1d and JK2887 carried maternal haplogroup J2a1a1.

Amenhotep III, Akhenaten, and Tutankhamen carried the paternal haplogroup R1b.

Ramesses III and "Unknown Man E", possibly Pentawere, carried paternal haplogroup E1b1a.

JK2134 and JK2911 carried paternal haplogroup J.

Takabuti carried maternal haplogroup H4a1 and YM:KMM A 63 carried maternal haplogroup HV.

OM:KMM A 64 carried maternal haplogroup T2c1a.

JK2888 carried paternal haplogroup E1b1b1a1b2.

In 2025, biochemist Jean-Philippe Gourdine reviewed genetic data on the Ancient Egyptian populations in the international scholarly publication, General History of Africa Volume IX. Expanding on a previous STR analysis co-performed with Keita, on the Amarna royal mummies which included Tutankhamun, Gourdine stated the analysis had found “that they had strong affinities with current sub-Saharan populations: 41 per cent to 93.9 per cent for sub-Saharan Africa, compared to 4.6 per cent to 41 per cent for Eurasia and 0.3 per cent to 16 per cent for Asia (Gourdine, 2018).” He also referenced comparable analysis conducted by DNA Tribes company, which specialized in genetic genealogy and had large datasets, with the latter having identified strong affinities between the Amarna royal mummies and Sub-Saharan African populations.

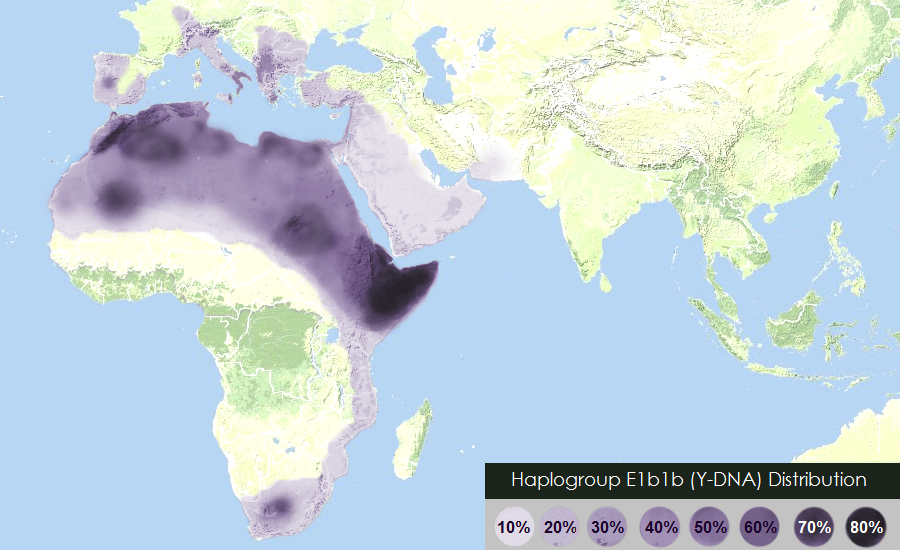
E1b1b is the most common paternal haplogroup across Africa, including Egypt, with modern genetic studies rooting the origin of the E haplogroup in East Africa.

Genetic analysis of a modern Upper Egyptian population in Adaima by Eric Crubézy had identified genetic markers common across Africa, with 71% of the Adaima samples carrying E1b1 haplogroup and 3% carrying the L0f mitochondrial haplogroup. A secondary review, published in UNESCO General History of Africa Volume IX, in 2025 noted the results were preliminary and need to be confirmed by other laboratories with new sequencing methods. This was supported by an anthropological study which found the notable presence of dental markers, characteristic of Khoisan people, in a predynastic-era cemetery at Adaïma. The genetic marker E1b1 was identified in a number of genetic studies to have wide distribution across Egypt, with "P2/215/M35.1 (E1b1b), for short M35, likely also originated in eastern tropical Africa, and is predominantly distributed in an arc from the Horn of Africa up through Egypt". Multiple STR analysis of the Amarna royal mummies (including Rameses III, Tutankhamun and Amenhotep III) were deployed to estimate their ethnicity have found they had strong affinities with modern Sub-Saharan populations. Nonetheless, these forms of analysis were not exhaustive as only 8 of the 13 CODIS markets were used.

===== Libya =====
At Takarkori rockshelter, in Libya, two naturally mummified women, dated to the Middle Pastoral Period (7000 BP), carried basal maternal haplogroup N.

===== Morocco =====
Van de Loorsdrecht et al. (2018) found that of seven samples of Taforalts of Morocco, radiocarbon dated to between 15,100 cal BP and 13,900 cal BP, six were found to carry maternal haplogroup U6a, and one was found to carry maternal haplogroup M1b. All six males were found to carry paternal haplogroup E1b1b, and they harbored 63.5% Natufian-related ancestry and 36.5% Sub-Saharan African-related ancestry. However, no present-day or ancient Holocene Sub-Saharan African group was found to be a good proxy for the non-Eurasian admixture component found in Taforalt individuals. Instead, Iosif Lazaridis et al. (2018) argued that this Iberomaurusian/Taforalt lineage contributed around 13% ancestry to modern West Africans "rather than Taforalt having ancestry from an unknown Sub-Saharan African source".

Finally a study in 2025 by researchers from the Max Planck Institute for Evolutionary Anthropology in Leipzig discovered that the non-Eurasian ancestry found in Taforalt was from an ancestral lineage, native to North Africa that diverged there before the Out-of-Africa migration that gave rise to Eurasians, but never left Africa and became mostly isolated (both from sub-Saharan African and Eurasian groups). This North African lineage did "not carry sub-Saharan African ancestry, suggesting that, contrary to previous interpretations, the Green Sahara was not a corridor connecting Northern and sub-Saharan Africa."

==== Mitochondrial DNA ====
Amid the Holocene, including the Holocene Climate Optimum in 8000 BP, Africans bearing haplogroup L2 spread within West Africa and Africans bearing haplogroup L3 spread within East Africa. As the largest migration since the Out of Africa migration, migration from Sub-Saharan Africa toward the North Africa occurred, by West Africans, Central Africans, and East Africans, resulting in migrations into Europe and Asia; consequently, Sub-Saharan African mitochondrial DNA was introduced into Europe and Asia. During the early period of the Holocene, 50% of Sub-Saharan African mitochondrial DNA was introduced into North Africa by West Africans and the other 50% was introduced by East Africans. During the modern period, a greater number of West Africans introduced Sub-Saharan African mitochondrial DNA into North Africa than East Africans.

Mitochondrial haplogroups L3, M, and N are found among Sudanese peoples (e.g., Beja, Nilotics, Nuba, Nubians), who have no known interaction (e.g., history of migration/admixture) with Europeans or Asians; rather than having developed in a post-Out-of-Africa migration context, mitochondrial macrohaplogroup L3/M/N and its subsequent development into distinct mitochondrial haplogroups (e.g., Haplogroup L3, Haplogroup M, Haplogroup N) may have occurred in East Africa at a time that considerably predates the Out-of-Africa migration event of 50,000 BP.

==== Medical DNA ====
The genomes of Africans commonly found to undergo adaptation are regulatory DNA, and many cases of adaptation found among Africans relate to diet, physiology, and evolutionary pressures from pathogens.

===== Lactase persistence =====
Neolithic agriculturalists, who may have resided in Northeast Africa and the Near East, may have been the source population for lactase persistence variants, including –13910*T, and may have been subsequently supplanted by later migrations of peoples. The Sub-Saharan West African Fulani, the North African Tuareg, and European agriculturalists, who are descendants of these Neolithic agriculturalists, share the lactase persistence variant –13910*T. While shared by Fulani and Tuareg herders, compared to the Tuareg variant, the Fulani variant of –13910*T has undergone a longer period of haplotype differentiation. The Fulani lactase persistence variant –13910*T may have spread, along with cattle pastoralism, between 9686 BP and 7534 BP, possibly around 8500 BP; corroborating this timeframe for the Fulani, by at least 7500 BP, there is evidence of herders engaging in the act of milking in the Central Sahara.

=== West Africa ===
==== Archaic Human DNA ====
Archaic traits found in human fossils of West Africa (e.g., Iho Eleru fossils, which dates to 13,000 BP) and Central Africa (e.g., Ishango fossils, which dates between 25,000 BP and 20,000 BP) may have developed as a result of admixture between archaic humans and modern humans or may be evidence of late-persisting early modern humans. While Denisovan and Neanderthal ancestry in non-Africans outside of Africa are more certain, archaic human ancestry in Africans is less certain and is too early to be established with certainty.

==== Ancient DNA ====
As of 2020, human ancient DNA has not been forthcoming in the region of West Africa.

==== Y-Chromosomal DNA ====
Eight male individuals from Guinea Bissau, two male individuals from Niger, one male individual from Mali, and one male individual from Cabo Verde carried haplogroup A1a.

As a result of haplogroup D0, a basal branch of haplogroup DE, being found in three Nigerian men, it may be the case that haplogroup DE, as well as its sublineages D0 and E, originated in Africa.

As of 19,000 years ago, Africans, bearing haplogroup E1b1a-V38, likely traversed across the Sahara, from east to west. E1b1a1-M2 likely originated in West Africa or Central Africa.

==== Mitochondrial DNA ====
Around 18,000 BP, Mende people, along with Gambian peoples, grew in population size.

In 15,000 BP, Niger-Congo speakers may have migrated from the Sahelian region of West Africa, along the Senegal River, and introduced L2a1 into North Africa, resulting in modern Mauritanian peoples and Berbers of Tunisia inheriting it.

Between 11,000 BP and 10,000 BP, Yoruba people and Esan people grew in population size.

As early as 11,000 years ago, Sub-Saharan West Africans, bearing macrohaplogroup L (e.g., L1b1a11, L1b1a6a, L1b1a8, L1b1a9a1, L2a1k, L3d1b1a), may have migrated through North Africa and into Europe, mostly into southern Europe (e.g., Iberia).

==== Autosomal DNA ====
During the early period of the Holocene, in 9000 BP, Khoisan-related peoples admixed with the ancestors of the Igbo people, possibly in the western Sahara.

Between 2000 BP and 1500 BP, Nilo-Saharan-speakers may have migrated across the Sahel, from East Africa into West Africa, and admixed with Niger-Congo-speaking Berom people. In 710 CE, West African-related populations (e.g., Niger-Congo-speaking Berom people, Bantu-speakers) and East African-related populations (Nilo-Saharan-speaking Ethiopians, Nilo-Saharan-speaking Chadians) admixed with one another in northern Nigeria and northern Cameroon.

Fan et al. (2019) found that the Fulani people show genetic affinity to isolated Afroasiatic-speaking groups in Eastern Africa, specifically Omotic-speakers such as the Aari people. While the Fulani have nearly exclusive indigenous African ancestry (defined by West and East African ancestry), they also show traces of West-Eurasian-like admixture, supporting an ancestral homeland somewhere in North or Eastern Africa, and westwards expansion during the Neolithic, possibly caused by the arrival and expansion of West-Eurasian-related groups. Fan et al. (2023) found that the Fulani, samples from whom they compared to various Central, East, and Southern African populations, could be modelled as possessing 50% Amhara-related and 50% Tikari-related ancestry. They suggested that the Fulani were initially Afroasiatic speakers that subsequently underwent language replacement and became Niger-Congo speakers. Various studies considering the Fulani alongside West African populations identify strong affinities with the Songhay.

==== Medical DNA ====
The genomes of Africans commonly found to undergo adaptation are regulatory DNA, and many cases of adaptation found among Africans relate to diet, physiology, and evolutionary pressures from pathogens. Throughout Sub-Saharan Africa, genetic adaptation (e.g., rs334 mutation, Duffy blood group, increased rates of G6PD deficiency, sickle cell disease) to malaria has been found among Sub-Saharan Africans, which may have initially developed in 7300 BP. Sub-Saharan Africans have more than 90% of the Duffy-null genotype.

===== Pediculus =====
During the Copper Age and early Islamic era of ancient Israel, West Africans may have migrated into ancient Israel and introduced head louse from West Africa.

===== Sickle Cell =====
Amid the Green Sahara, the mutation for sickle cell originated in the Sahara or in the northwest forest region of western Central Africa (e.g., Cameroon) by at least 7,300 years ago, though possibly as early as 22,000 years ago. The ancestral sickle cell haplotype to modern haplotypes (e.g., Cameroon/Central African Republic and Benin/Senegal haplotypes) may have first arose in the ancestors of modern West Africans, bearing haplogroups E1b1a1-L485 and E1b1a1-U175 or their ancestral haplogroup E1b1a1-M4732. West Africans (e.g., Yoruba and Esan of Nigeria), bearing the Benin sickle cell haplotype, may have migrated through the northeastern region of Africa into the western region of Arabia. West Africans (e.g., Mende of Sierra Leone), bearing the Senegal sickle cell haplotype, may have migrated into Mauritania (77% modern rate of occurrence) and Senegal (100%); they may also have migrated across the Sahara, into North Africa, and from North Africa, into Southern Europe, Turkey, and a region near northern Iraq and southern Turkey. Some may have migrated into and introduced the Senegal and Benin sickle cell haplotypes into Basra, Iraq, where both occur equally. West Africans, bearing the Benin sickle cell haplotype, may have migrated into the northern region of Iraq (69.5%), Jordan (80%), Lebanon (73%), Oman (52.1%), and Egypt (80.8%).

===== Schistosomes =====
According to Steverding (2020), while not definite: Near the African Great Lakes, schistosomes (e.g., S. mansoni, S. haematobium) underwent evolution. Subsequently, there was an expansion alongside the Nile. From Egypt, the presence of schistosomes may have expanded, via migratory Yoruba people, into Western Africa. Thereafter, schistosomes may have expanded, via migratory Bantu peoples, into the rest of Sub-Saharan Africa (e.g., Southern Africa, Central Africa).

===== Thalassemia =====
Through pathways taken by caravans, or via travel amid the Almovarid period, a population (e.g., Sub-Saharan West Africans) may have introduced the –29 (A → G) β-thalassemia mutation (found in notable amounts among African Americans) into the North African region of Morocco.

==== Domesticated Animal DNA ====
While the Niger-Congo migration may have been from West Africa into Kordofan, possibly from Kordofan, Sudan, Niger-Congo speakers accompanied by undomesticated helmeted guineafowls, may have traversed into West Africa, domesticated the helmeted guineafowls by 3000 BCE, and via the Bantu expansion, traversed into other parts of Sub-Saharan Africa (e.g., Central Africa, East Africa, Southern Africa).

=== Central Africa ===
==== Archaic Human DNA ====
Archaic traits found in human fossils of West Africa (e.g., Iho Eleru fossils, which dates to 13,000 BP) and Central Africa (e.g., Ishango fossils, which dates between 25,000 BP and 20,000 BP) may have developed as a result of admixture between archaic humans and modern humans or may be evidence of late-persisting early modern humans. While Denisovan and Neanderthal ancestry in non-Africans outside of Africa are more certain, archaic human ancestry in Africans is less certain and is too early to be established with certainty.

==== Ancient DNA ====
In 4000 BP, there may have been a population that traversed from Africa (e.g., West Africa or West-Central Africa), through the Strait of Gibraltar, into the Iberian Peninsula, where admixing between Africans and Iberians (e.g., of northern Portugal, of southern Spain) occurred.

===== Cameroon =====
West African hunter-gatherers, in the region of western Central Africa (e.g., Shum Laka, Cameroon), particularly between 8000 BP and 3000 BP, were found to be related to modern Central African hunter-gatherers (e.g., Baka, Bakola, Biaka, Bedzan).

===== Democratic Republic of Congo =====
At Kindoki, in the Democratic Republic of Congo, there were three individuals, dated to the protohistoric period (230 BP, 150 BP, 230 BP); one carried haplogroups E1b1a1a1d1a2 (E-CTS99, E-CTS99) and L1c3a1b, another carried haplogroup E (E-M96, E-PF1620), and the last carried haplogroups R1b1 (R-P25 1, R-M415) and L0a1b1a1.

==== Y-Chromosomal DNA ====
Haplogroup R1b-V88 is thought to have originated in Europe and migrated into Africa with farmers or herders in the Neolithic period, c. 5500 BC. R1b-V88 is found at a high frequency among Chadic speaking peoples such as the Hausa, as well as in Kanembu, Fulani, and Toubou populations.

==== Mitochondrial DNA ====
In 150,000 BP, Africans (e.g., Central Africans, East Africans) bearing haplogroup L1 diverged. Between 75,000 BP and 60,000 BP, Africans bearing haplogroup L3 emerged in East Africa and eventually migrated into and became present in modern West Africans, Central Africans, and non-Africans. Amid the Holocene, including the Holocene Climate Optimum in 8000 BP, Africans bearing haplogroup L2 spread within West Africa and Africans bearing haplogroup L3 spread within East Africa. As the largest migration since the Out of Africa migration, migration from Sub-Saharan Africa toward the North Africa occurred, by West Africans, Central Africans, and East Africans, resulting in migrations into Europe and Asia; consequently, Sub-Saharan African mitochondrial DNA was introduced into Europe and Asia.

Mitochondrial haplogroup L1c is strongly associated with pygmies, especially with Bambenga groups. L1c prevalence was variously reported as: 100% in Ba-Kola, 97% in Aka (Ba-Benzélé), and 77% in Biaka, 100% of the Bedzan (Tikar), 97% and 100% in the Baka people of Gabon and Cameroon, respectively, 97% in Bakoya (97%), and 82% in Ba-Bongo. Mitochondrial haplogroups L2a and L0a are prevalent among the Bambuti.

==== Autosomal DNA ====
Genetically, African pygmies have some key difference between them and Bantu peoples.

==== Medical DNA ====
Evidence suggests that, when compared to other Sub-Saharan African populations, African pygmy populations display unusually low levels of expression of the genes encoding for human growth hormone and its receptor associated with low serum levels of insulin-like growth factor-1 and short stature.

The genomes of Africans commonly found to undergo adaptation are regulatory DNA, and many cases of adaptation found among Africans relate to diet, physiology, and evolutionary pressures from pathogens. Throughout Sub-Saharan Africa, genetic adaptation (e.g., rs334 mutation, Duffy blood group, increased rates of G6PD deficiency, sickle cell disease) to malaria has been found among Sub-Saharan Africans, which may have initially developed in 7300 BP. Sub-Saharan Africans have more than 90% of the Duffy-null genotype. In the rainforests of Central Africa, genetic adaptation for non-height-related factors (e.g., immune traits, reproduction, thyroid function) and short stature (e.g., EHB1 and PRDM5 – bone synthesis; OBSCN and COX10 – muscular development; HESX1 and ASB14 – pituitary gland's growth hormone production/secretion) has been found among rainforest hunter-gatherers.

=== Eastern Africa ===
From the region of Kenya and Tanzania to South Africa, eastern Bantu-speaking Africans constitute a north to south genetic cline; additionally, from eastern Africa to toward southern Africa, evidence of genetic homogeneity is indicative of a serial founder effect and admixture events having occurred between Bantu-speaking Africans and other African populations by the time the Bantu migration had spanned into South Africa.

==== Archaic Human DNA ====
While Denisovan and Neanderthal ancestry in non-Africans outside of Africa are more certain, archaic human ancestry in Africans is less certain and is too early to be established with certainty.

==== Ancient DNA ====
===== Ethiopia =====
At Mota, in Ethiopia, an individual, estimated to date to the 5th millennium BP, carried haplogroups E1b1 and L3x2a. The individual of Mota is genetically related to groups residing near the region of Mota, and in particular, are considerably genetically related to the Aari people, especially the blacksmith caste of that group.

===== Kenya =====
At Jawuoyo Rockshelter, in Kisumu County, Kenya, a forager of the Later Stone Age carried haplogroups E1b1b1a1b2/E-V22 and L4b2a2c.

At Ol Kalou, in Nyandarua County, Kenya, a pastoralist of the Pastoral Neolithic carried haplogroups E1b1b1b2b2a1/E-M293 and L3d1d.

At Kokurmatakore, in Marsabit County, Kenya, a pastoralist of the Pastoral Iron Age carried haplogroups E1b1b1/E-M35 and L3a2a.

At White Rock Point, in Homa Bay County, Kenya, there were two foragers of the Later Stone Age; one carried haplogroups BT (xCT), likely B, and L2a4, and another probably carried haplogroup L0a2.

At Nyarindi Rockshelter, in Kenya, there were two individuals, dated to the Later Stone Age (3500 BP); one carried haplogroup L4b2a and another carried haplogroup E (E-M96, E-P162).

At Lukenya Hill, in Kenya, there were two individuals, dated to the Pastoral Neolithic (3500 BP); one carried haplogroups E1b1b1b2b (E-M293, E-CTS10880) and L4b2a2b, and another carried haplogroup L0f1.

At Hyrax Hill, in Kenya, an individual, dated to the Pastoral Neolithic (2300 BP), carried haplogroups E1b1b1b2b (E-M293, E-M293) and L5a1b.

At Molo Cave, in Kenya, there were two individuals, dated to the Pastoral Neolithic (1500 BP); while one had haplogroups that went undetermined, another carried haplogroups E1b1b1b2b (E-M293, E-M293) and L3h1a2a1.

At Kakapel, in Kenya, there were three individuals, one dated to the Later Stone Age (3900 BP) and two dated to the Later Iron Age (300 BP, 900 BP); one carried haplogroups CT (CT-M168, CT-M5695) and L3i1, another carried haplogroup L2a1f, and the last carried haplogroup L2a5.

At Panga ya Saidi, in Kenya, an individual, estimated to date between 496 BP and 322 BP, carried haplogroups E1b1b1b2 and L4b2a2.

At Kilifi, Mtwapa, in Kenya, an individual, dated between 1250 CE and 1650 CE, carried haplogroup L3b1a1a.

===== Tanzania =====
At Mlambalasi rockshelter, in Tanzania, an individual, dated between 20,345 BP and 17,025 BP, carried undetermined haplogroups.

At Gishimangeda Cave, in Karatu District, Tanzania, there were eleven pastoralists of the Pastoral Neolithic; one carried haplogroups E1b1b1a1b2/E-V22 and HV1b1, another carried haplogroup L0a, another carried haplogroup L3x1, another carried haplogroup L4b2a2b, another carried haplogroups E1b1b1b2b2a1/E-M293 and L3i2, another carried haplogroup L3h1a2a1, another carried haplogroups E1b1b1b2b2/E-V1486, likely E-M293 and L0f2a1, and another carried haplogroups E1b1b1b2b2/E-V1486, likely E-M293, and T2+150; while most of the haplogroups among three pastoralists went undetermined, one was determined to carry haplogroup BT, likely B.

At Kilwa, Coast, in Tanzania, an individual, dated between 1300 CE and 1600 CE, carried haplogroups J2a2a1a1a2a~ and L2a1h.

At Lindi, in Tanzania, an individual, dated between 1511 cal CE and 1664 cal CE, carried haplogroups E1b1a1a1a2a1a3a1d~ and L0a1a2.

At Makangale Cave, on Pemba Island, Tanzania, an individual, estimated to date between 1421 BP and 1307 BP, carried haplogroup L0a.

At Songo Mnara, in Tanzania, an individual, dated between 1294 cal CE and 1392 cal CE, carried haplogroups R1a and L3e3a.

===== Uganda =====
At Munsa, in Uganda, an individual, dated to the Later Iron Age (500 BP), carried haplogroup L3b1a1.

==== Y-Chromosomal DNA ====
As of 19,000 years ago, Africans, bearing haplogroup E1b1a-V38, likely traversed across the Sahara, from east to west.

Before the slave trade period, East Africans, who carried haplogroup E1b1a-M2, expanded into Arabia, resulting in various rates of inheritance throughout Arabia (e.g., 2.8% Qatar, 3.2% Yemen, 5.5% United Arab Emirates, 7.4% Oman).

==== Mitochondrial DNA ====
In 150,000 BP, Africans (e.g., Central Africans, East Africans) bearing haplogroup L1 diverged. In 130,000 BP, Africans bearing haplogroup L5 diverged in East Africa. Between 130,000 BP and 75,000 BP, behavioral modernity emerged among Southern Africans and long-term interactions between the regions of Southern Africa and Eastern Africa became established. Between 75,000 BP and 60,000 BP, Africans bearing haplogroup L3 emerged in East Africa and eventually migrated into and became present in modern West Africans, Central Africans, and non-Africans. Amid the Holocene, including the Holocene Climate Optimum in 8000 BP, Africans bearing haplogroup L2 spread within West Africa and Africans bearing haplogroup L3 spread within East Africa. As the largest migration since the Out of Africa migration, migration from Sub-Saharan Africa toward the North Africa occurred, by West Africans, Central Africans, and East Africans, resulting in migrations into Europe and Asia; consequently, Sub-Saharan African mitochondrial DNA was introduced into Europe and Asia. During the early period of the Holocene, 50% of Sub-Saharan African mitochondrial DNA was introduced into North Africa by West Africans and the other 50% was introduced by East Africans. During the modern period, a greater number of West Africans introduced Sub-Saharan African mitochondrial DNA into North Africa than East Africans. Between 15,000 BP and 7000 BP, 86% of Sub-Saharan African mitochondrial DNA was introduced into Southwest Asia by East Africans, largely in the region of Arabia, which constitute 50% of Sub-Saharan African mitochondrial DNA in modern Southwest Asia. In the modern period, 68% of Sub-Saharan African mitochondrial DNA was introduced by East Africans and 22% was introduced by West Africans, which constitutes 50% of Sub-Saharan African mitochondrial DNA in modern Southwest Asia.

==== Autosomal DNA ====
Across all areas of Madagascar, the average ancestry for the Malagasy people was found to be 4% West Eurasian, 37% Austronesian, and 59% Bantu.

==== Medical DNA ====
The genomes of Africans commonly found to undergo adaptation are regulatory DNA, and many cases of adaptation found among Africans relate to diet, physiology, and evolutionary pressures from pathogens. Throughout Sub-Saharan Africa, genetic adaptation (e.g., rs334 mutation, Duffy blood group, increased rates of G6PD deficiency, sickle cell disease) to malaria has been found among Sub-Saharan Africans, which may have initially developed in 7300 BP. Sub-Saharan Africans have more than 90% of the Duffy-null genotype. In the highlands of Ethiopia, genetic adaptation (e.g., rs10803083, an SNP associated with the rate and function of hemoglobin; BHLHE41, a gene associated with circadian rhythm and hypoxia response; EGNL1, a gene strongly associated with oxygen homeostasis in mammals) to hypoxia and low atmospheric pressure has been found among the Amhara people, which may have developed within the past 5000 years. In Tanzania, genetic adaptation (e.g., greater amount of amylase genes than in African populations that consume low-starch foods) has been found in the Hadza people due to a food diet that especially includes consumption of tubers.

=== Southern Africa ===
From the region of Kenya and Tanzania to South Africa, eastern Bantu-speaking Africans constitute a north to south genetic cline; additionally, from eastern Africa to toward southern Africa, evidence of genetic homogeneity is indicative of a serial founder effect and admixture events having occurred between Bantu-speaking Africans and other African populations by the time the Bantu migration had spanned into South Africa.

==== Archaic Human DNA ====
While Denisovan and Neanderthal ancestry in non-Africans outside of Africa are more certain, archaic human ancestry in Africans is less certain and is too early to be established with certainty.

==== Ancient DNA ====
Three Later Stone Age hunter-gatherers carried ancient DNA similar to Khoisan-speaking hunter-gatherers. Prior to the Bantu migration into the region, as evidenced by ancient DNA from Botswana, East African herders migrated into Southern Africa. Out of four Iron Age Bantu agriculturalists of West African origin, two earlier agriculturalists carried ancient DNA similar to Tsonga and Venda peoples and the two later agriculturalists carried ancient DNA similar to Nguni people; this indicates that there were various movements of peoples in the overall Bantu migration, which resulted in increased interaction and admixing between Bantu-speaking peoples and Khoisan-speaking peoples.

===== Botswana =====
At Nqoma, in Botswana, an individual, dated to the Early Iron Age (900 BP), carried haplogroup L2a1f.

At Taukome, in Botswana, an individual, dated to the Early Iron Age (1100 BP), carried haplogroups E1b1a1 (E-M2, E-Z1123) and L0d3b1.

At Xaro, in Botswana, there were two individuals, dated to the Early Iron Age (1400 BP); one carried haplogroups E1b1a1a1c1a and L3e1a2, and another carried haplogroups E1b1b1b2b (E-M293, E-CTS10880) and L0k1a2.

===== Malawi =====
At Fingira rockshelter, in Malawi, an individual, dated between 6179 BP and 2341 BP, carried haplogroups B2 and L0d1.

At Chencherere, in Malawi, an individual, estimated to date between 5400 BP and 4800 BP, carried haplogroup L0k2.

At Hora 1 rockshelter, in Malawi, an individual, dated between 16,897 BP and 15,827 BP, carried haplogroups B2b and L5b.

===== South Africa =====
At Doonside, in South Africa, an individual, estimated to date between 2296 BP and 1910 BP, carried haplogroup L0d2.

At Ballito Bay, South Africa, an individual, estimated to date between 1986 BP and 1831 BP, carried haplogroups A1b1b2 and L0d2c1.

At Kalemba rockshelter, in Zambia, an individual, dated between 5285 BP and 4975 BP, carried haplogroup L0d1b2b.

==== Y-Chromosomal DNA ====
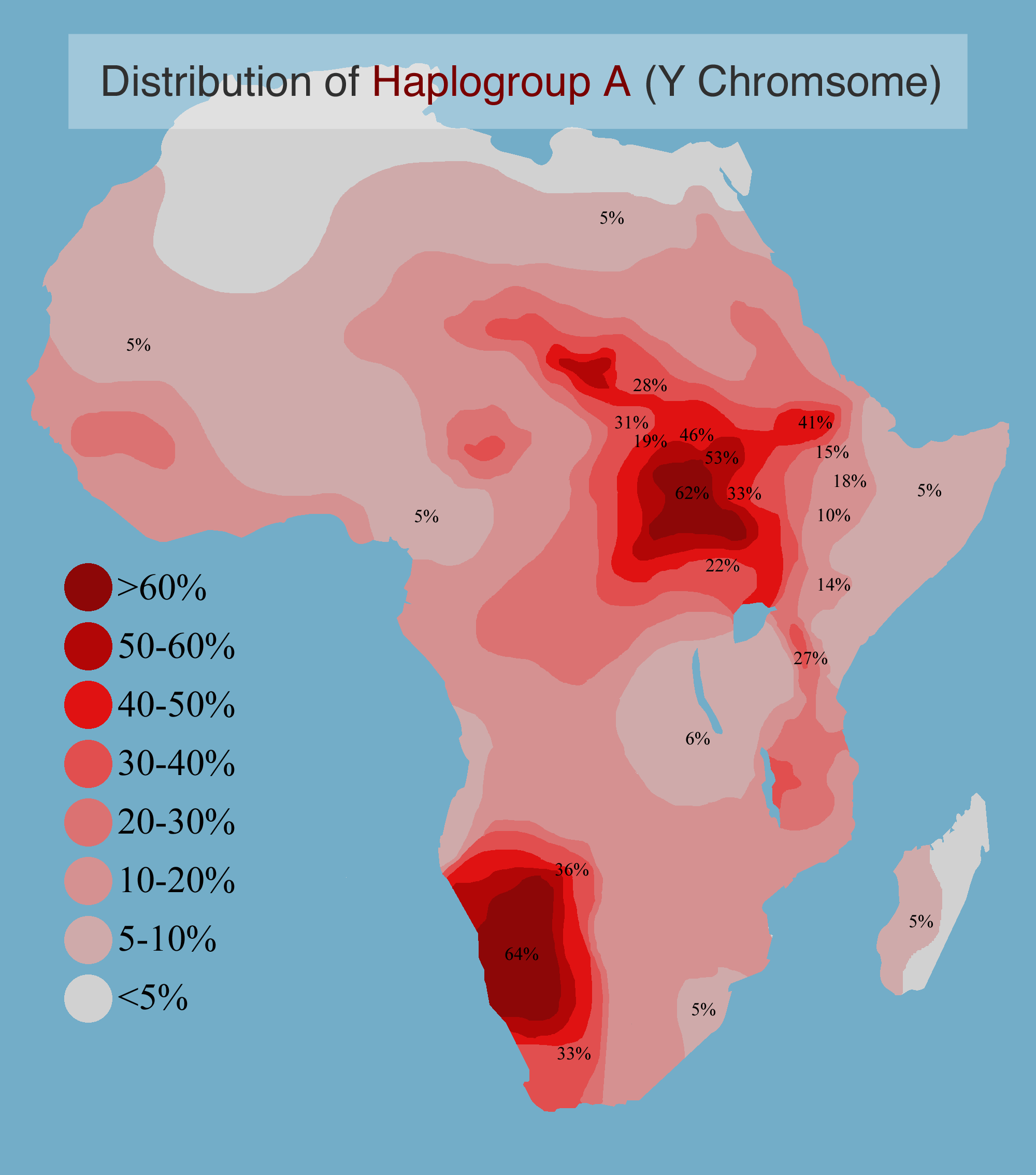
Distribution of Y-Chromosome Haplogroup A in Africa.

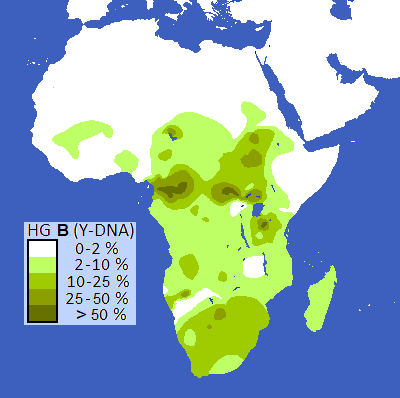
Distribution of haplogroup B (M60) of the human Y chromosome in native populations.

Various Y chromosome studies show that the San carry some of the most divergent (oldest) human Y-chromosome haplogroups. These haplogroups are specific sub-groups of haplogroups A and B, the two earliest branches on the human Y-chromosome tree.

==== Mitochondrial DNA ====
In 200,000 BP, Africans (e.g., Khoisan of Southern Africa) bearing haplogroup L0 diverged from other Africans bearing haplogroup L1′6, which tend to be northward of Southern Africa. Between 130,000 BP and 75,000 BP, behavioral modernity emerged among Southern Africans and long-term interactions between the regions of Southern Africa and Eastern Africa became established.

Mitochondrial DNA studies also provide evidence that the San carry high frequencies of the earliest haplogroup branches in the human mitochondrial DNA tree. This DNA is inherited only from one's mother. The most divergent (oldest) mitochondrial haplogroup, L0d, has been identified at its highest frequencies in the southern African San groups.

==== Autosomal DNA ====
Henn et al. (2011) found that the ǂKhomani San, as well as the Sandawe and Hadza peoples of Tanzania, were the most genetically diverse of any living humans studied. This high degree of genetic diversity hints at the origin of anatomically modern humans.

==== Medical DNA ====
Among the ancient DNA from three hunter-gatherers sharing genetic similarity with San people and four Iron Age agriculturalists, their SNPs indicated that they bore variants for resistance against sleeping sickness and Plasmodium vivax. In particular, two out of the four Iron Age agriculturalists bore variants for resistance against sleeping sickness and three out of the four Iron Age agriculturalists bore Duffy negative variants for resistance against malaria. In contrast to the Iron Age agriculturalists, from among the San-related hunter-gatherers, a six-year-old boy may have died from schistosomiasis. In Botswana, a man, who dates to 1400 BP, may have also carried the Duffy negative variant for resistance against malaria.

The genomes of Africans commonly found to undergo adaptation are regulatory DNA, and many cases of adaptation found among Africans relate to diet, physiology, and evolutionary pressures from pathogens. Throughout Sub-Saharan Africa, genetic adaptation (e.g., rs334 mutation, Duffy blood group, increased rates of G6PD deficiency, sickle cell disease) to malaria has been found among Sub-Saharan Africans, which may have initially developed in 7300 BP. Sub-Saharan Africans have more than 90% of the Duffy-null genotype. In the Kalahari Desert region of Africa, various possible genetic adaptations (e.g., adiponectin, body mass index, metabolism) have been found among the ǂKhomani people. Sub-Saharan Africans have more than 90% of the Duffy-null genotype. In South Africa, genetic adaptation (e.g., rs28647531 on chromosome 4q22) and strong susceptibility to tuberculosis has been found among Coloureds.

== Recent African origin of modern humans ==
Between 500,000 BP and 300,000 BP, anatomically modern humans may have emerged in Africa. As Africans (e.g., Y-Chromosomal Adam, Mitochondrial Eve) have migrated from their places of origin in Africa to other locations in Africa, and as the time of divergence for East African, Central African, and West African lineages are similar to the time of divergence for the Southern African lineage, there is insufficient evidence to identify a specific region for the origin of humans in Africa. In 100,000 BP, anatomically modern humans migrated from Africa into Eurasia. Subsequently, tens of thousands of years after, the ancestors of all present-day Eurasians migrated from Africa into Eurasia and eventually became admixed with Denisovans and Neanderthals.

Archaeological and fossil evidence provide support for the African origin of homo sapiens and behavioral modernity. Models reflecting a pan-African origin (multiple locations of origin within Africa) and evolution of modern humans have been developed. As the idea of "modern" has become increasingly problematized, research has "begun to disentangle what is meant by "modern" genetic ancestry, skeletal morphology, and behavior, recognizing these are unlikely to form a single package."

In comparison to the non-African genome, the African genome features a ~25% greater number of polymorphisms, or 3 to 5 times as many, and genetic variants that are rare outside of Africa are found to occur at an abundant rate within Africa. Most of the genetic diversity found among non-Africans is found to be, at large, a subset of genetic diversity found among Africans. The genomes of Africans commonly found to undergo adaptation are regulatory DNA, and many cases of adaptation found among Africans relate to diet, physiology, and evolutionary pressures from pathogens. Throughout Sub-Saharan Africa, genetic adaptation (e.g., rs334 mutation, Duffy blood group, increased rates of G6PD deficiency, sickle cell disease) to malaria has been found among Sub-Saharan Africans, which may have initially developed in 7300 BP. Throughout Africa, various genetic adaptations (e.g., apolipoprotein L1 (APOL1): G1 and G2 haplotype resistance to trypanosomiasis and increased risk of kidney disease; human leukocyte antigen (HLA) genes; major histocompatibility complex (MHC)) to HIV-1, smallpox, trypanosomiasis (African sleeping sickness), and tuberculosis has been found among Africans. Biomedical tests for specific genetic variants (e.g., rs1799853 in the CYP2C9 gene), which have been approved by the U.S. Food and Drug Administration and are intended to indicate correct prescription of warfarin, has been found to be increasingly irrelevant to Africans as the variants are rare in Africa. As frequency rate factors into considering and deciding variant pathogenicity and generalizable polygenic scores, modern clinical classifications of genetic variant pathogenicity are found to be inadequate due to a lack of genetic diversity in biomedical studies. Fan et al (2023) recently found ~5.3 million unique genetic variants in 180 African hunter-gatherer populations, and among existing classifications for variants determined to likely be "pathogenic", ~29% (44/154) of these "pathogenic" classified variants were found to occur frequently among the African hunter-gatherers.

== See also ==
- Genetic history of the African diaspora
