= Haplogroup L1 =

Human mitochondrial DNA grouping indicating common ancestry

- Possible time of origin: 107,600–174,300 YBP
- Possible place of origin: Central Africa
- Ancestor: L1-6
- Descendants: L1b, L1c
- Defining mutations: 3666, 7055, 7389, 13789, 14178, 14560

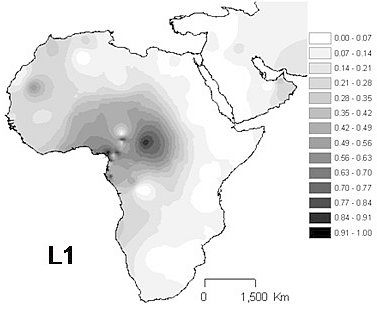
Projected spatial distribution of haplogroup L1 in Africa.

Haplogroup L1 is a human mitochondrial DNA (mtDNA) haplogroup. It is most common in Central Africa and West Africa. It diverged from L1-6 at about 140,000 years ago (140.6+33.7
−33.0 kya 95% CI). Its emergence is associated with the early peopling of Africa by anatomically modern humans during the Eemian, and it is now mostly found in Central African foragers.

== Ancient DNA ==
Among the less than 1% of subgroups of macro-haplogroup L found among the population in Europe, haplogroup L1b is present; haplogroup L1b in Europe, which is often found in West Africa, has been dated to 10,000 BP.

== Distribution ==
Haplogroup L1 is found most commonly in Central Africa and West Africa. It reaches its highest frequency among the Mbenga people. It is likely that it was formerly more widespread, and was constrained to its current area as a result of the Bantu migration (which is largely associated with haplogroup L2). Haplogroup L1 has been observed in specimens from the island cemetery in Kulubnarti, Sudan, which date from the Early Christian period (AD 550–800). An ancient Beaker culture individual at the Camino de las Yeseras in Spain (San Fernando de Henares, Madrid; [I4245 / RISE695] F) has also been found to carry the L1b1a mitochondrial haplogroup.

== Subclades ==
=== L1c ===
L1c emerged at about 85 kya. It reaches its highest frequencies in Central Africa, notably among the Mbenga people. (See map.) Among the Mbenga, it is carried by 100% of Ba-Kola, 97% of Ba-Benzélé, and 77% of Biaka. Other populations in which L1c is particularly prevalent include the Bedzan (Tikar) people (100%), Baka people from Gabon (97%) and Cameroon (90%), the Bakoya (97%), and the Ba-Bongo (82%). Common also in São Tomé (20%) and Angola (16–24%).

=== L1b ===
L1b is much more recent, dated at about 10 kya. It is frequent in West Africa. It has also been found in Mozambique (1%), Ethiopia (2%), Egypt (1%), the Nile Valley (4%), Kung (1%), Cape Verde (8%), Senegal (17–20%), Niger/Nigeria (15%), Guinea Bissau (11%), Morocco (4–5%), and Algeria (1–2%).

== Phylogenetics ==
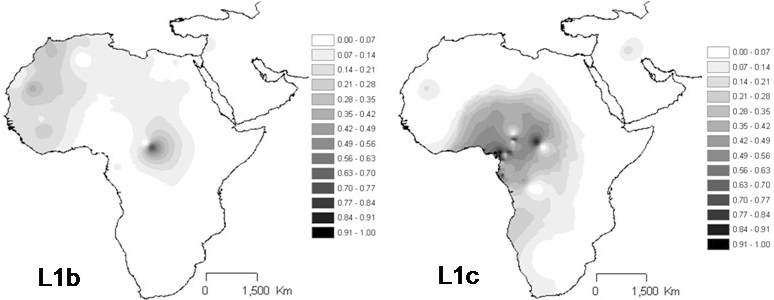
Interpolation maps for haplogroup L1b and L1c.

L1 has two branches, L1c and L1b (the formerly named haplogroups L1d, L1k, L1a, L1f have been re-classified into haplogroup L0, as L0d, L0k, L0a, L0f; L1e as L5).

Phylogeny of L1c:

- L1c
  - L1c1'2'4'6
    - L1c1
      - L1c1a
        - L1c1a1
          - L1c1a1a
            - L1c1a1a1
              - L1c1a1a1a
              - L1c1a1a1b
                - L1c1a1a1b1
            - L1c1a1a2
          - L1c1a1b
        - L1c1a2
          - L1c1a2a
            - L1c1a2a1
            - L1c1a2a2
          - L1c1a2b
          - L1c1a2c
      - L1c1b'c'd
        - L1c1b
        - L1c1c'd
          - L1c1c
          - L1c1d
    - L1c2'4
      - L1c2
        - L1c2a
          - L1c2a1
            - L1c2a1a
            - L1c2a1b
          - L1c2a2
        - L1c2b
          - L1c2b1
          - L1c2b2
      - L1c4
        - L1c4a
        - L1c4b
    - L1c6
  - L1c3
    - L1c3a
      - L1c3a1
      - L1c3a1a
    - L1c3b'c
      - L1c3b
        - L1c3b1
          - L1c3b1a
          - L1c3b1b
        - L1c3b2
      - L1c3c

Phylogeny of L1b:

- L1b
  - L1b1
    - L1b1a
      - L1b1a1'4
        - L1b1a1
        - L1b1a4
      - L1b1a2
        - L1b1a2a
      - 189
        - L1b1a3
          - L1b1a3a
            - L1b1a3a1
      - L1b1a5
      - L1b1a6
      - L1b1a7

== See also ==
- Genealogical DNA test
- Genetic genealogy
- Human mitochondrial genetics
- Population genetics
- Human mitochondrial DNA haplogroups

Phylogenetic tree of human mitochondrial DNA (mtDNA) haplogroups

Mitochondrial Eve (L)

L0
L1–6

L1
L2

L3

L4
L5
L6
M
N

CZ
D
E
G
Q

O
A
S
R

I
W
X
Y
C
Z
B
F
R0

pre-JT

P

U
HV
JT
K
H
V
J
T
