= Macro-haplogroup L =

Human mitochondrial lineage

Haplogroup L
- Time of origin: 230 to 150 kya
- Place of origin: Eastern Africa
- Descendants: L0, L1-6

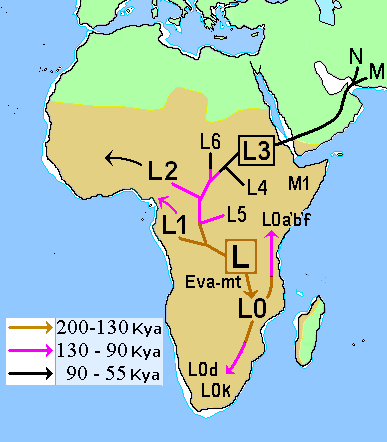
Overview of the main divisions of haplogroup L.

In human mitochondrial genetics, L is the mitochondrial DNA macro-haplogroup that is at the root of the anatomically modern human (Homo sapiens) mtDNA phylogenetic tree. As such, it represents the most ancestral mitochondrial lineage of all currently living modern humans, also dubbed "Mitochondrial Eve".

Its two sub-clades are L1-6 and L0. The split occurred during the Penultimate Glacial Period; L1-6 is estimated to have formed ca. 170 kya, and L0 ca. 150 kya. The formation of L0 is associated with the peopling of Southern Africa by populations ancestral to the Khoisan, ca. 140 kya, at the onset of the Eemian interglacial. L is further subdivided into L1-6 and L1, dated ca. 150 kya and 130 kya, respectively. Haplogroups L5 (120 kya), L2 and L6 (90 kya), L4 (80 kya) and L3 (70 kya).

== Origin ==
The outgroup for mtDNA phylogeny of modern humans is the mtDNA of archaic humans, specifically Neanderthals and Denisovans. The split of the modern human lineage from the Neanderthal and Denisovan lineage is dated to between ca. 760–550 kya based on full genome analysis. This is consistent with the estimate based on Y-chromosomal DNA, which places the split between ca. 806–447 kya. In terms of mtDNA, however, it appears that modern humans and Neanderthals form a sister clade, with Denisovans as basal outgroup. The split of Neanderthal and modern human mtDNA is dated to about 498–295 kya, i.e. significantly younger than the date estimated based on nuclear DNA. This has been explained as reflecting early gene flow from Africa into the Neanderthal genome, around 270 kya or earlier, i.e. around the time of the first emergence of anatomically modern humans (Jebel Irhoud). Posth et al. (2017) suggest the possibility that early Homo sapiens mtDNA from Africa may have replaced the original Neanderthal mtDNA entirely even when assuming minimal admixture. The Neanderthal and Denisovan lineages diverged before about 430 kya, and Denisovan mtDNA was not affected by the introgression.

The most recent common ancestor of modern human mtDNA (dubbed "Mitochondrial Eve") is dated to ca. 230–150 kya. The emergence of haplogroup L1-6 by definition dates a later time, at an estimated 200–130 kya, possibly in a population in eastern Africa. Haplogroup L0 emerges from the basal haplogroup L1-6* somewhat later, at an estimated 190–110 kya.

The deep time depth of these lineages entails that substructure of this haplogroup within Africa is complex and poorly understood. Date estimates are necessarily imprecise. The intervals cited above represent high and low estimates of the 95% confidence interval following Soares et al. (2009), the most likely ages are to be taken near the center of these intervals.

== Phylogeny ==
=== L1-6 ===
Haplogroup L1-6
- Possible time of origin: 200 to 130 kya
- Ancestor: L (Mitochondrial Eve)
- Descendants: L1, L2-L6
- Defining mutations: 146, 182, 4312, 10664, 10915, 11914, 13276, 16230

Haplogroup L phylogeny

- L
  - L1─6
    - L1
      - L1
      - L2
    - - L3
      - - L4
        - - L5
          - - L6
            - L7
  - L0
    - L0d
    - - L0k
      - - L0f
        - - L0a
          - L0b

Haplogroup L1-6 (also L1'2'3'4'5'6) split off undifferentiated haplogroup L roughly 20,000 years after Mitochondrial Eve, or at roughly 170,000 years ago (167±36 kya in the estimate of Soares et al. 2009). It diverged, in its turn, into L1 (150 kya), L5 (120 kya), and L2 (90 kya) before the recent out-of Africa event of ca. 70 kya. L3 emerges around 70 kya and is closely associated with the out-of-Africa event; it may have arisen either in East Africa or in Asia. L6 and L4 are sister clades of L3, but they are limited to East Africa and did not participate in the out-of-Africa migration.

Haplogroup L1 diverged from L at about 140,000 years ago. Its emergence is associated with the early peopling of Africa by anatomically modern humans during the Eemian, and it is now mostly found in Bantu & Semi Bantu speaking West African populations.

Haplogroup L5 was formerly classified as L1e, but is now recognized as having diverged from L1 at about 120 kya. It is also mostly associated with pygmies, with highest frequency in Mbuti pygmies from Eastern Central Africa at 15%.

Haplogroup L2 diverged from L(1'4'6)'2 at about 90 kya, associated with the peopling of East West Africa. As a result of the South East Bantu migration it is now spread throughout Central Sub-Saharan Africa, at the expense of the previously more widespread L0, L1 and L5.

Haplogroup L6 diverged from L3'4'6 at about the same time, ca. 90 kya. It is now a minor haplogroup with distribution mostly limited to the Horn of Africa and southern East Africa.

Haplogroup L3 diverged from L3'4 at about 70 kya, likely shortly before the Southern Dispersal event (Out-of-Africa migration), possibly in East Africa. The mtDNA of all non-Africans is derived from L3, divided into two main lineages, M and N.

Haplogroup L4 is a minor haplogroup of East Africa that arose around 70 kya but did not participate in the out-of-Africa migration. The haplogroup formerly named L7 has been re-classified as a subclade of L4, named L4a.

=== L0 ===
Haplogroup L0 arose between about 200 and 130 kya, that is, at about the same time as L1, before the beginning of the Eemian. It is associated with the peopling of Southern Africa after about 140,000 years ago.

Its subclades are L0d and L0k. Both are almost exclusively restricted to the Khoisan of southern Africa, but L0d has also been detected among the Sandawe people of Tanzania, which suggests an ancient connection between the Khoisan and East African speakers of click languages.

Haplogroup L0f is present in relatively small frequencies in Tanzania among the Sandawe people who are known to be older than the Khoisan. L0a is most prevalent in South-East African populations (25% in Mozambique), and L0b is found in Ethiopia.

== Distribution ==
Putting aside its sub-branches, haplogroups M and N, the L haplogroups are predominant all over sub-Saharan Africa; L is at 96–100%, apart. It is found in North Africa, Arabian Peninsula, Middle East, Americas, Europe, ranging from low to high frequencies depending on the country.

=== Africa ===
The mutations that are used to identify the basal lineages of haplogroup L, are ancient and may be 150,000 years old. The deep time depth of these lineages entails that substructure of this haplogroup within Africa is complex and, at present, poorly understood. The first split within haplogroup L occurred 140–200kya, with the mutations that define macrohaplogroups L0 and L1-6. These two haplogroups are found throughout Africa at varying frequencies and thus exhibit an entangled pattern of mtDNA variation. However the distribution of some subclades of haplogroup L is structured around geographic or ethnic units. For example, the deepest clades of haplogroup L0, L0d and L0k are almost exclusively restricted to the Khoisan of southern Africa. L0d has also been detected among the Sandawe of Tanzania, which suggests an ancient connection between the Khoisan and East African populations.

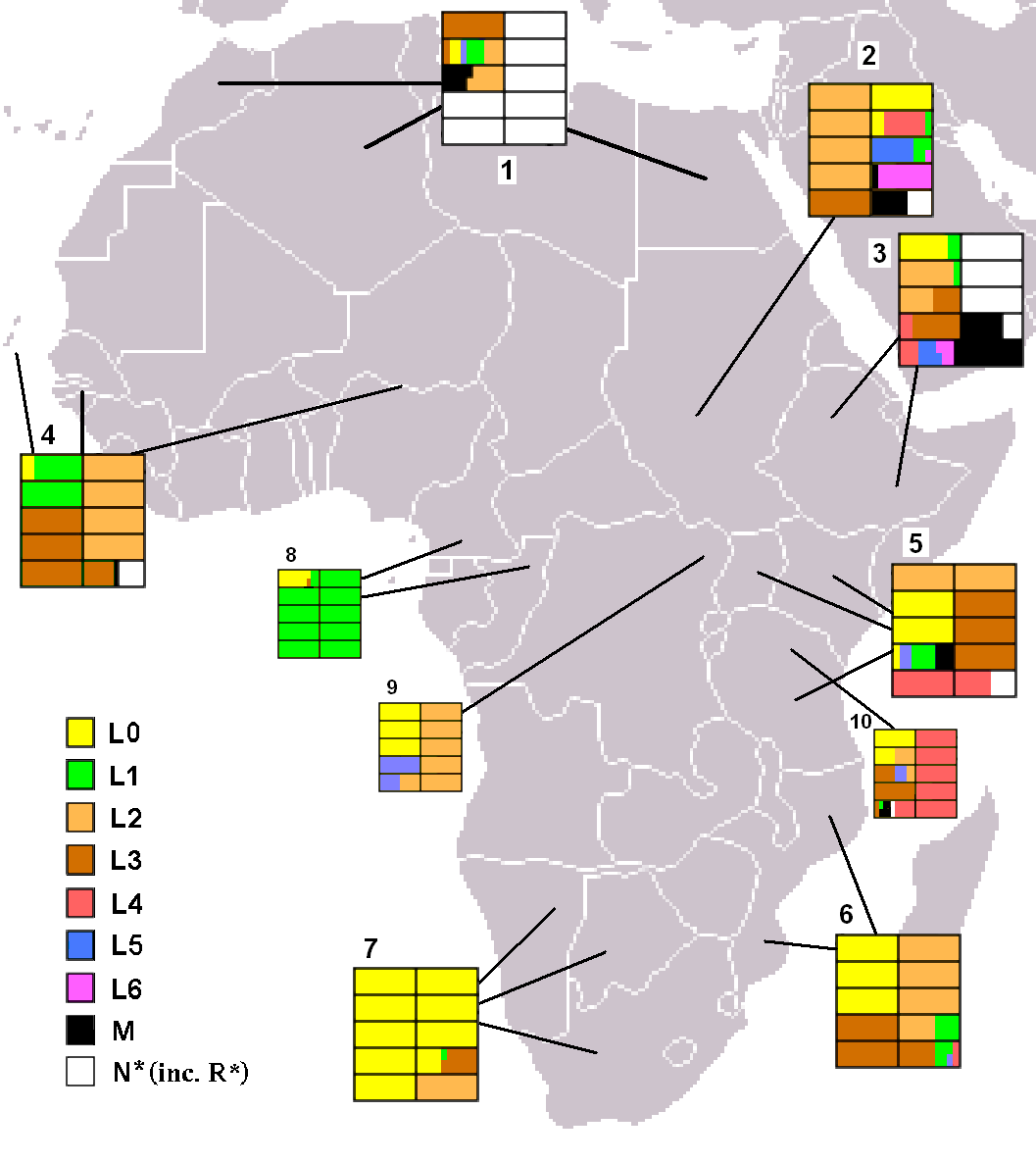
Macro-haplogroup L (mtDNA) composition within Africa. Approximate frequencies in: 1. North Africa.; 2. Sudan.; 3. Ethiopia.; 4. West Africa.; 5. East Africa (Kenya, Uganda, Tanzania).; 6. Southeast Africa (Mozambique).; 7. Native Southern Africans (!Xung, !Kung and Khwe khoisans).; 8. Mbenga Pygmies (Baka, Bi-Aka and Ba-Kola).; 9. Ba-Mbuti Pygmies.; 10. Hadza/Sandawe.

=== South Africa ===
Haplogroup L reaches 100% in many native South African population. Various South Africa's ethnic minority have different frequencies of Haplogroup L lineages. It's found 47% in the Cape Coloured, 44% in Cape Malay, 14% in Indian Muslims, 20% in other Muslim population in South Africa.

=== North Africa ===
Haplogroup L is also found at moderate frequencies in North Africa. For example, the various Berber populations have frequencies of haplogroup L lineages that range from 3% to 45%. Haplogroup L has also been found at a small frequency of 2.2% in North African Jews from Morocco, Tunisia and Libya. Frequency was the highest in Libyan Jews 3.6%. Moroccan Arabs have more elevated SSA maternal admixture at around 21% to 36% Via L-mtDNA sequences, Highest frequencies of L-mtDNA is reported to Moroccan Arabs of The Surrounding area of El jadida at 33%.

=== West Asia ===
Haplogroup L is also found in West Asia at low to moderate frequencies, most notably in Yemen where frequencies as high as 60% have been reported. It is also found at 15.50% in Bedouins from Israel, 13.68% in Palestinians, 12.55% in Jordanians, 9.48% in Iraqis, 9.15% in Syrians, 7.5% in the Hazara of Afghanistan, 6.66% in Saudi Arabians, 2.84% in Lebanese, 2.60% in Druzes from Israel, 2.44% in Kurds and 1.76% in Turks. Overall the Arab slave trade and expansion of foreign empires that encapsulated Saudi Arabia were linked to the presence of haplogroup L in the Saudi Arabian gene pool.

=== Europe ===
In Europe, haplogroup L is found at low frequencies, typically less than 1% with the exception of Iberia (Spain and Portugal) where regional frequencies as high as 18.2% have been reported and some regions of Italy where frequencies between 2 and 3% have been found. Overall frequency in Iberia is higher in Portugal than in Spain where frequencies are only high in the south and west of the country. Increasing frequencies are observed for Galicia (3.26%) and northern Portugal (3.21%), through the center (5.02%) and to the south of Portugal (11.38%). Relatively high frequencies of 7.40% and 8.30% were also reported respectively in South Spain, in the present population of Huelva and Priego de Cordoba by Casas et al. 2006. Significant frequencies were also found in the Autonomous regions of Portugal, with L haplogroups constituting about 13% of the lineages in Madeira and 3.4% in the Azores. In the Spanish archipelago of Canary Islands, frequencies have been reported at 6.6%. According to some researchers L lineages in Iberia are associated to Islamic invasions, while for others it may be due to more ancient processes as well as more recent ones through the introduction of these lineages by means of the modern slave trade. The highest frequency (18.2%) of Sub-Saharan lineages found so far in Europe were observed by Alvarez et al. 2010 in the comarca of Sayago in Spain and in Alcacer do Sal in Portugal. In Italy, Haplogroup L lineages are present in some regions at frequencies between 2 and 3% in Latium (2.90%), parts of Tuscany, Basilicata and Sicily. In 2015 study found that a prehistoric episode would be the main contributor to the sub-Saharan presence in Mediterranean Europe and Iberia. A 2018 study ascribed high levels of African admixture in Spain and Portugal to two separate episodes, one during the North African Islamic expansions into Iberia and one later one, possibly related to the slave trade.

=== The Americas ===
Haplogroup L lineages are found in the African diaspora of the Americas as well as indigenous Americans. Haplogroup L lineages are predominant among African Americans, Afro-Caribbeans and Afro-Latin-Americans. In Brazil, Pena et al. report that 85% of self-identified Afro-Brazilians have Haplogroup L mtDNA sequences. Haplogroup L lineages are also found at moderate frequencies in self-identified White Brazilians. Alves Silva reports that 28% of a sample of White Brazilians belong to haplogroup L. In Argentina, a minor contribution of African lineages was observed throughout the country. Haplogroup L lineages were also reported at 8% in Colombia, and at 4.50% in North-Central Mexico. In North America, haplogroup L lineages were reported at a frequency of 0.90% in White Americans of European ancestry.

Haplogroup L are detected in various Amerindian groups in ranging frequencies. It was found in 8% in the Nahua-Coyolillo and 7.1% in Chibcha speaking group Nasa ethnic group.

== Haplogroup L Frequencies (> 1%) ==
Region	Population or Country	Number tested	Reference	%
North Africa	Libya (Jews)	83	Behar et al. (2008)	3.60%
North Africa	Tunisia (Jews)	37	Behar et al. (2008)	2.20%
North Africa	Morocco (Jews)	149	Behar et al. (2008)	1.34%
North Africa	Tunisia	64	Turchi et al. (2009)	48.40%
North Africa	Tunisia (Takrouna)	33	Frigi et al. (2006)	3.03%
North Africa	Tunisia (Zriba)	50	Turchi et al. (2009)	8.00%
North Africa	Morocco	56	Turchi et al. (2009)	26.80%
North Africa	Morocco (Berbers)	64	Turchi et al. (2009)	3.20%
North Africa	Algeria (Mozabites)	85	Turchi et al. (2009)	12.90%
North Africa	Algeria	47	Turchi et al. (2009)	20.70%
Europe	Italy (Latium)	138	Achilli et al. (2007)	2.90%
Europe	Italy (Volterra)	114	Achilli et al. (2007)	2.60%
Europe	Italy (Basilicata)	92	Ottoni et al. (2009)	2.20%
Europe	Italy (Sicily)	154	Ottoni et al. (2009)	2.00%
Europe	Malta	132	Caruana et al. (2016)	15.90%
Europe	Spain	312	Alvarez et al. (2007)	2.90%
Europe	Spain (Galicia)	92	Pereira et al. (2005)	3.30%
Europe	Spain (North East)	118	Pereira et al. (2005)	2.54%
Europe	Spain (Priego de Cordoba)	108	Casas et al. (2006)	8.30%
Europe	Spain (Zamora)	214	Alvarez et al. (2010)	4.70%
Europe	Spain (Sayago)	33	Alvarez et al. (2010)	18.18%
Europe	Spain (Catalonia)	101	Alvarez-Iglesias et al. (2009)	2.97%
Europe	South Iberia	310	Casas et al. (2006)	7.40%
Europe	Spain (Canaries)	300	Brehm et al. (2003)	6.60%
Europe	Spain (Balearic Islands)	231	Picornell et al. (2005)	2.20%
Europe	Spain (Andalusia)	1004	Barral-Arca et al. (2016)	2.6%
Europe	Spain (Castilla y Leon)	428	Barral-Arca et al. (2016)	2.1%
Europe	Spain (Aragón)	70	Barral-Arca et al. (2016)	4.3%
Europe	Spain (Asturias)	99	Barral-Arca et al. (2016)	4.0%
Europe	Spain (Galicia)	98	Barral-Arca et al. (2016)	2.0%
Europe	Spain (Madrid)	178	Barral-Arca et al. (2016)	1.70%
Europe	Spain (Castilla-La Mancha)	207	Barral-Arca et al. (2016)	1.40%
Europe	Spain (Extremadura)	87	Barral-Arca et al. (2016)	1.10%
Europe	Spain (Huelva)	280	Hernández et al. (2015)	3.93%
Europe	Spain (Granada)	470	Hernández et al. (2015)	1.49%
Europe	Portugal	594	Achilli et al. (2007)	6.90%
Europe	Portugal (North)	188	Achilli et al. (2007)	3.19%
Europe	Portugal (Central)	203	Achilli et al. (2007)	6.40%
Europe	Portugal (South)	203	Achilli et al. (2007)	10.84%
Europe	Portugal	549	Pereira et al. (2005)	5.83%
Europe	Portugal (North)	187	Pereira et al. (2005)	3.21%
Europe	Portugal (Central)	239	Pereira et al. (2005)	5.02%
Europe	Portugal (South)	123	Pereira et al. (2005)	11.38%
Europe	Portugal (Madeira)	155	Brehm et al. (2003)	12.90%
Europe	Portugal (Açores)	179	Brehm et al. (2003)	3.40%
Europe	Portugal (Alcacer do Sal)	50	Pereira et al. (2010)	22.00%
Europe	Portugal (Coruche)	160	Pereira et al. (2010)	8.70%
Europe	Portugal (Pias)	75	Pereira et al. (2010)	3.90%
Europe	Portugal	1429	Barral-Arca et al. (2016)	6.16%
West Asia	Yemen	115	Kivisild et al. (2004)	45.70%
West Asia	Yemen (Jews)	119	Behar et al. (2008)	16.81%
West Asia	Bedouins (Israel)	58	Behar et al. (2008)	15.50%
West Asia	Palestinians (Israel)	117	Achilli et al. (2007)	13.68%
West Asia	Jordania	494	Achilli et al. (2007)	12.50%
West Asia	Iraq	116	Achilli et al. (2007)	9.48%
West Asia	Syria	328	Achilli et al. (2007)	9.15%
West Asia	Saudi Arabia	120	Abu-Amero et al. (2007)	6.66%
West Asia	Lebanon	176	Achilli et al. (2007)	2.84%
West Asia	Druzes (Israel)	77	Behar et al. (2008)	2.60%
West Asia	Kurds	82	Achilli et al. (2007)	2.44%
West Asia	Turkey	340	Achilli et al. (2007)	1.76%
South America	Colombia (Antioquia)	113	Bedoya et al. (2006)	8.00%
North America	Mexico (North-Central)	223	Green et al. (2000)	4.50%
South America	Argentina	246	Corach et al. (2009)	2.03%

== See also ==
- Peopling of Africa
- Homo sapiens
- Recent African origin of modern humans
- Middle Stone Age
