= Bedzan people =

African ethnic group

The Bedzan people (singular Medzan), also known as the Tikar, are a pygmy (or perhaps pygmoid) people of Cameroon. The Bedzan community is primarily located in the village of Yoko, on the Tikar Plain, in the Mbam-et-Kim department of the Centre Region, and its population is estimated to be between 250 and 1,200. They live at the interface of the forest and the savannah, and their language is a dialect of Tikar, which is related to the Bantu languages. The Bedzan Pygmies also refer to themselves Tikar, a name inspired by the Tikar people of Bamenda Grassfields. The Bedzan may have been subjects of the Tikar fondom at one point in the past, which could explain why they speak a dialect of Tikar.

Although not particularly short in stature—at least any longer—the Bedzan are considered pygmies because of their historical ties to the forest and cultural features, such as their music.
