= Bakoya =

Ethnic group in Central Africa

The Bakoya are pygmies, earlier known as Négrilles or Babinga, who inhabitant the rainforest between Cameroon and the Great Lake region of the Congo Basin in Central Africa. Since the 1930s, the Bakoya, in particular, have settled in Gabon in the Ogooue-Ivindo Province, in the northeastern region of the country. Similar minority groups are the Babongo and the Baka pygmies. Before they adapted to the agricultural practices in the new settlements in Gabon along the flanks of the road, Bakoya were "semi-nomadic hunter-gatherers" like the other forest-dwelling pygmies; they resided in small huts. The word 'Pygmee' is a French coinage, adopted by the Gabonese. They are the earliest inhabitants of the forest and are nomadic hunter gatherers.

== Location ==
Pygmies living in the Imbong village are specifically known as Bakoya. They are situated in the Ogooue-Ivindo Province, which is one of the nine provinces of Gabon. They are settled along the Mékambo to Mazingo (Canton Djoua) road and (Canton Djoua), and from Mékambo to Ekata (Canton Loué) road in the Zadié Department.

== History ==
Following the many internecine wars among the tribal groups of the region, the Bakoya, who were living on the banks of the Ogooué River migrated along with the non-pygmy group of Bongom to an upstream region of the Ivindo and Zadié Rivers. According to the oral traditions of the Bakoya, during their travel through the forests they accompanied the Bongom, a non-pygmie tribe. While the Bongom moved out of the forests and established themselves on the Mékambo-Mazingo Road by setting up the villages of Ego, Grand Itumbi, Ngunangu and Ibea, the Bakoya had stayed back in the forest to harvest their crops of u.panda (Panda oleosa) and did not move to the Mékambo-Mazingo Road immediately. At this time the French who had colonized Gabon also created better living facilities.

The Bakoya, Baka and Babongo are three minorities groups of Gabon who are known as the "Pygmies of Gabon" (said to be the first people to inhabit the forests of Gabon) and they form a very small minority of a few thousand people only. All of them have left behind their hunter-gatherer vocation to more "sedentary" modern way of life. Their skills of hunting game with "bow and poisoned arrows, game traps and harpoons" are however much more skillful than the majority population of the Bantu community in the country. But their lot is subject to humiliation at the hands of the Bantus. However, in recent years there is an effort to project their history as a matter of tourism interest and their culture has been brought forth in the form of exhibitions, lectures and discussions. One such initiative was taken in 2002 when an exhibition was organized to project the history of pygmies and their culture.

The government of Gabon recognized the Minorités Autochtones Pygmées au Gabon (MINAPYGA; the Indigenous Pygmy Minorities of Gabon) organization of Bokayo in 1997, which is one of three such indigenous organizations in the country; the other two recognized groups are the Edzendgui and the Association pour le Developpement de la Culture des Peuples Pygmees du Gabon.

== Notable people ==
Leonard Odambo is one of the few well-educated Bokayo who is a qualified journalist and head of an NGO in Libreville.
