= Haplogroup B (mtDNA) =

Human mitochondrial DNA haplogroup

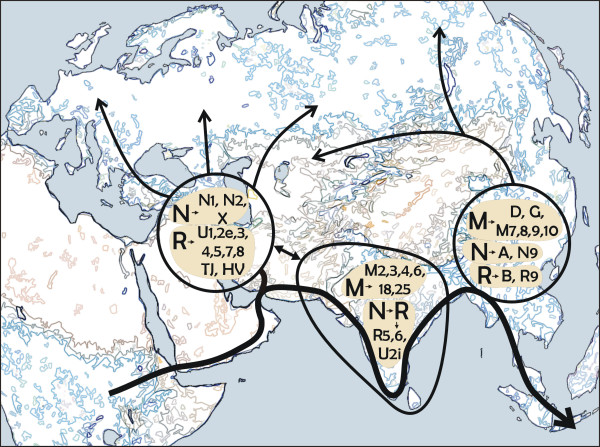
- Possible time of origin: 50,000 YBP
- Possible place of origin: Southeast Asia
- Ancestor: R11'B B4'5'R11B6'R24
- Descendants: B2, B4, B5, B6
- Defining mutations: 8281-8289d

In human mitochondrial genetics, haplogroup B is a human mitochondrial DNA (mtDNA) haplogroup.

== Origin ==
Haplogroup B is believed to have arisen in Asia some 50,000 years before present. Its ancestral haplogroup was Eurasian haplogroup R.

The greatest variety of haplogroup B is in China. It is therefore likely that it underwent its earliest diversification in mainland East or South East Asia.

== Distribution ==
Basal B was found in Upper Paleolithic Tianyuan man.

Haplogroup B is now most common among populations native to Southeast Asia, as well as speakers of Sino-Tibetan languages and Austronesian languages.

A subclade of B4b (which is sometimes labeled B2) is one of five haplogroups found among the indigenous peoples of the Americas, the others being A, C, D, and X.

Because the migration to the Americas by the ancestors of indigenous Americans is generally believed to have been from northeastern Siberia via Beringia, it is surprising that Haplogroup B and Haplogroup X have not been found in Paleo-Siberian tribes of northeastern Siberia. However, Haplogroup B has been found among Turkic, Mongolic, and Tungusic populations of Siberia, such as Tuvans, Altays, Shors, Khakassians, Yakuts, Buryats, Mongols, Negidals, and Evenks. This haplogroup is also found among populations in China, Indonesia, Iran, Iraq, Japan, Korea, Laos, Madagascar, Malaysia, Melanesia, Micronesia, Mongolia, the Philippines, Polynesia, Thailand, and Vietnam.

Although haplogroup B in general has been found in many Siberian population samples, the subclade that is phylogenetically closest to American B2, namely B4b1, has been found mainly in populations of southern China and Southeast Asia, especially Filipinos and Austronesian speakers of eastern Indonesia (approx. 8%) and the aborigines of Taiwan and Hainan (approx. 7%). However, B4b1 has been observed in populations as far north as Turochak and Choya districts in the north of Altai Republic (3/72 = 4.2% Tubalar), Miyazaki and Tokyo, Japan (approx. 3%), South Korea (4/185 = 2.2%), Tuva (1/95 = 1.1% Tuvan), and Hulunbuir (1/149 = 0.7% Barghut).

=== Table of Frequencies of MtDNA Haplogroup B ===
Population	Frequency	Count	Source	Subtypes
Carolinian (Saipan)	1.000	17		B4a1a1a=15, B4a1a(xB4a1a1a)=2
Hawaiians	0.994	160		B4a1a1, B4a1a1a1, B4a1a1a3
Dingban Yao (Mengla, Yunnan)	0.600	10		B4(xB4a, B4b1, B4e, B4f)=3, B4a=1, B4e=1, B4f=1
Iu Mien (Mengla, Yunnan)	0.481	27		B4a=7, B4b1=5, B5a=1
Bapai Yao (Liannan, Guangdong)	0.429	35		B5a=7, B4e=3, B4b1=2, B4a=1, B4(xB4a, B4b1, B4e, B4f)=1, B(xB4, B5)=1
Filipino	0.422	64		B4a1a(xB4a1a1)=8, B5b=7, B4b1=6, B4c1b=4, B4a1a1=1, B5a=1
Tu Yao (Hezhou, Guangxi)	0.390	41		B5a=7, B4(xB4a, B4b1, B4e, B4f)=6, B4a=3
Guoshan Yao (Jianghua, Hunan)	0.375	24		B5a=7, B4(xB4a, B4b1, B4e, B4f)=2
Cham (Bình Thuận, Vietnam)	0.369	168		B5a=27, B4c2=18, B4c1b2=3, B4h=3, B4a1(xB4a1a)=2, B4g=2, B5b2a=2, B4a(xB4a1)=1, B4a1a=1, B4b1=1, B4c1b(xB4c1b2)=1, B5b1=1
Huatou Yao (Fangcheng, Guangxi)	0.368	19		B5a=3, B4a=2, B4b1=1, B4e=1
Filipino (Luzon)	0.367	177		B4a1a(xB4a1a1)=20, B5b=18, B4b1=13, B4c1b=10, B5a=2, B4a(xB4a1a)=1, B7=1
Hmong (Wenshan, Yunnan)	0.333	39		B5a=8, B4a=5
Dong (Tianzhu County, Guizhou)	0.321	28		B4a=6, B5a=2, B4c=1
Kinh (Vietnamese)	0.317	139		B4=24, B5=19, B6=1
Mien (Shangsi, Guangxi)	0.313	32		B4a=5, B5a=3, B4e=2
Kim Mun (Malipo, Yunnan)	0.300	40		B5a=5, B4a=3, B4e=2, B4b1=1, B5(xB5a, B5b)=1
Dai (Xishuangbanna, Yunnan)	0.293	41		B5a=4, B(xB4, B5a, B5b)=4, B4a=3, B4(xB4a)=1
Bunu (Dahua & Tianlin, Guangxi)	0.280	25		B4a=5, B5a=2
Filipino (Visayas)	0.277	112		B4a1a(xB4a1a1)=11, B4b1=8, B4c1b=7, B5b=5
Lanten Yao (Tianlin, Guangxi)	0.269	26		B4a=3, B5a=2, B4b1=1, B4f=1
Laos	0.262	214		B5a=26, B4g=7, B4c2=6, B4a'g*=3, B4a1*=3, B4b1a2a=2, B4e=2, B4*=1, B4a1b=1, B4b1*=1, B4b1a1'2*=1, B4c1b=1, B5b=1, B6=1
Wuzhou Yao (Fuchuan, Guangxi)	0.258	31		B4a=4, B5a=3, B4b1=1
Lahu (Simao, Yunnan)	0.250	32		B4a=5, B4(xB4a, B4b1)=3
Pan Yao (Tianlin, Guangxi)	0.250	32		B5a=4, B4a=2, B4f=1, B5b=1
Yi (Xishuangbanna, Yunnan)	0.250	16		B4(xB4a, B4b1)=1, B4a=1, B5(xB5a, B5b)=1, B5a=1
Naxi (Lijiang, Yunnan)	0.244	45		B4a=5, B4(xB4a, B4b1)=3, B5a=3
Filipino (Mindanao)	0.243	70		B4a1a(xB4a1a1)=7, B4b1=5, B5b=3, B4a(xB4a1a)=1, B4a1a1=1
Lowland Yao (Fuchuan, Guangxi)	0.238	42		B4a=3, B4b1=3, B4(xB4a, B4b1, B4e, B4f)=2, B5a=1, B5b=1
Han (Taiwan)	0.234	111		B4+C16261T+G16129A!=6, B5a1=3, B4+C16261T=2, B4b1a2=2, B4b1b'c=2, B4c1b2a(xB4c1b2a2)=2, B4g=2, B4a1a(xB4a1a1a)=1, B4a4=1, B4b1a3=1, B4c1b+A16335G=1, B4c1c=1, B5b(xB5b2a)=1, B5b2a=1
Gelao (Daozhen County, Guizhou)	0.226	31		B4a=3, B4(xB4a, B4b, B4c)=2, B4b=1, B5a=1
Bai (Xishuangbanna, Yunnan)	0.211	19		B4(xB4a, B4b1)=2, B4a=1, B5a=1
Han (Taipei, Taiwan)	0.209	91		B4(xB4f)=13, B5=6
Gelao (Daozhen County, Guizhou)	0.206	102		B4a=5, B4b1=5, B5a=5, B4(xB4a, B4b, B4c, B4e, B4f, B4g)=3, B5b=2, B4c=1
Korean (South Korea)	0.204	103		B4=13, B5=8
CHS (Han from Hunan & Fujian)	0.200	55		B5=6, B4=5
Lahu (Xishuangbanna, Yunnan)	0.200	15		B4(xB4a, B4b1)=1, B4a=1, B4b1=1
Han (Southern California)	0.192	390		B=75
Dai (Xishuangbanna, Yunnan)	0.190	21		B4a=2, B4(xB4a)=1, B5b=1
Han (Southwest China; pool of 44 Sichuan, 34 Chongqing, 33 Yunnan, and 26 Guizhou)	0.190	137		B4b'd=9, B4a=6, B5a=4, B4c=3, B(xB4a, B4b'd, B4c, B5a, B5b, B6)=2, B5b=1, B6=1
Tujia (western Hunan)	0.188	64		B4a=5, B5b=3, B4(xB4a, B4b1)=2, B5a=2
Hmong (Jishou, Hunan)	0.184	103		B5a=6, B4a=5, B4b1=3, B4(xB4a, B4b1, B4e, B4f)=2, B4e=1, B4f=1, B5b=1
Hani (Xishuangbanna, Yunnan)	0.182	33		B5a=2, B4(xB4a, B4b1)=1, B4a=1, B4b1=1, B5b=1
Xiban Yao (Fangcheng, Guangxi)	0.182	11		B4a=1, B4b1=1
Korean (Seoul & Daejeon, South Korea)	0.180	261		B(xB5)=32, B5=15
Han (Taiwan)	0.179	1117		B=200
CHD (Han from Denver, Colorado)	0.178	73		B4=12, B5=1
Hui (Xinjiang)	0.178	45		B4a=4, B5a=2, B4b1=1, B6=1
Yi (Shuangbai, Yunnan)	0.175	40		B4(xB4a, B4b1)=5, B4a=1, B4b1=1
Tujia (Yanhe County, Guizhou)	0.172	29		B4b=3, B5a=2
Thailand	0.171	105		B(xB5a1)=13, B5a1=5
Tibetan (Zhongdian, Yunnan)	0.171	35		B5a=4, B4(xB4a, B4b1)=2
Aini (Xishuangbanna, Yunnan)	0.160	50		B4a=4, B(xB4, B5)=2, B4(xB4a, B4b1)=1, B5a=1
Chinese (Shenyang, Liaoning)	0.156	160		B4(xB4f)=15, B5=10
Daur (Evenk Autonomous Banner)	0.156	45		B4(xB4a, B4b)=4, B4a=3
Korean (Seoul National University Hospital)	0.155	633		B=98
Yi (Hezhang County, Guizhou)	0.150	20		B4b=1, B4(xB4a, B4b, B4c)=1, B6=1
Mongolian (Ulaanbaatar)	0.149	47		B4=5, B5=2
Korean (South Korea)	0.148	203		B4(xB4f)=24, B5=6
Korean (South Korea)	0.146	185		B4a=11, B4(xB4a, B4b, B4c)=7, B4b1=4, B5a=2, B5b=2, B4c=1
Vietnamese	0.143	42		B4(xB4a, B4b, B4c)=3, B4a=1, B4b(xB4b1)=1, B5a=1
Okinawa	0.141	326		B4(xB4f)=28, B4f=10, B5=8
CHB (Han from Beijing Normal University)	0.140	121		B4=14, B5=3
JPT (Japanese from Tokyo)	0.136	118		B4=11, B5=5
Tujia (Yongshun, Hunan)	0.133	30		B4(xB4a, B4b1)=2, B5a=2
Japanese (Hokkaidō)	0.129	217		B4(xB4f)=18, B4f=5, B5=5
Japanese (Tōkai)	0.124	282		B4(xB4f)=26, B5=9
Japanese (Gifu)	0.121	1617		B=196
Negidal	0.121	33		B5b2=4
Japanese (Tōhoku)	0.119	336		B4(xB4f)=24, B5=15, B4f=1
Korean (northern China)	0.118	51		B4a=2, B4b(xB4b1)=2, B5a=1, B5b=1
Telengit (Altai Republic)	0.113	71		B4=8
Jino (Xishuangbanna, Yunnan)	0.111	18		B4a=1, B5a=1
Tibetan (Nyingchi, Tibet)	0.111	54		B4a=5, B5b=1
Japanese (northern Kyūshū)	0.109	256		B4(xB4f)=19, B5=8, B4f=1
Japanese	0.109	211		B4b1=14, B5b=4, B5a=2, B4a=1, B4(xB4a, B4b1)=1, B5(xB5a, B5b)=1
Evenk (New Barag Left Banner)	0.106	47		B4b=4, B5b=1
Korean (Arun Banner)	0.104	48		B4b=2, B5b=2, B4(xB4a, B4b)=1
Mongol (New Barag Left Banner)	0.104	48		B4b=3, B4a=1, B5a=1
Han (Beijing)	0.100	40		B(xB4, B5a, B5b)=2, B4b(xB4b1)=2
Nu (Gongshan, Yunnan)	0.100	30		B4(xB4a, B4b1)=3
Thai	0.100	40		B5a=3, B(xB4, B5a, B5b)=1
Yi (Luxi, Yunnan)	0.097	31		B4(xB4a, B4b1)=2, B(xB4, B5)=1
Japanese (Miyazaki)	0.090	100		B4b1a1=3, B4(xB4a, B4b1)=2, B4a=2, B5b=2
Khakassian (Khakassia)	0.088	57		B4=5
Han (Xinjiang)	0.085	47		B5a=2, B4b1=1, B5b=1
Kyrgyz (Sary-Tash, Kyrgyzstan)	0.085	47		B5a=2, B4(xB4a, B4b1, B4c)=1, B4a=1
Mongolian (Ulaanbaatar)	0.085	47		B4(xB4a, B4b, B4c)=2, B4a=1, B5b=1
Tuvan	0.084	95		B4a1c2=4, B5=2, B4(xB4a1c2, B4b1a, B4d1a)=1, B4b1a=1
Tibetan (Nyingchi, Tibet)	0.083	24		B=2
Barghut (Hulunbuir)	0.081	149		B4c1a2(xB4c1a2a)=4, B4f1=2, B5b(xB5b2)=2, B4c1a2a=1, B4b1a3a1a=1, B4d1=1, B5b2=1
Chamorro (85 Guam, 14 Saipan, & 6 Rota)	0.076	105		B4a1a1a=7, B4b1=1
Manchurian	0.075	40		B4(xB4a, B4b, B4c)=2, B4a=1
Uzbek (Uzbekistan/Kyrgyzstan)	0.075	40		B=3
Uyghur (Penjim, Panfilov District, Almaty Province, Kazakhstan)	0.073	55		B5a=3, B4(xB4a, B4b1, B4c)=1
Buryat	0.071	126		B4(xB4a, B4b)=5, B5b=2, B(xB4, B5a, B5b)=1, B4b=1
Khamnigan (Buryatia)	0.071	99		B4=5, B5=2
Dungan (Uzbekistan/Kyrgyzstan)	0.063	16		B=1
Persian (eastern Iran)	0.061	82		B4=4, B5=1
Nogai (Dagestan)	0.061	33		B=2
Tibetan (Nagchu, Tibet)	0.057	35		B=2
Kazakh (Kegen Valley, Almaty Province, Kazakhstan)	0.055	55		B4(xB4a, B4b1, B4c)=1, B4a=1, B5b=1
Lisu (Gongshan, Yunnan)	0.054	37		B4(xB4a, B4b1)=1, B5(xB5a, B5b)=1
Tharu (Chitwan, Nepal)	0.053	133		B5a=7
Uzbek (Xinjiang)	0.052	58		B4b1=2, B4c=1
Bukharan Arab (Uzbekistan/Kyrgyzstan)	0.050	20		B=1
Filipino (Palawan)	0.050	20		B4a1a=1
Tajik (Uzbekistan/Kyrgyzstan)	0.050	20		B=1
Turkmen (Uzbekistan/Kyrgyzstan)	0.050	20		B=1
Shor (Kemerovo Oblast)	0.049	82		B4=4
Va (Simao, Yunnan)	0.045	22		B4(xB4a)=1
Altai Kizhi	0.044	90		B4=3, B5=1
Bai (Dali, Yunnan)	0.044	68		B5a=2, B4b1=1
Tofalar	0.043	46		B4a1c2=2
Kyrgyz (Bakay-Ata, Kyrgyzstan)	0.042	48		B4(xB4a, B4b1, B4c)=1, B5b=1
Tubalar	0.042	72		B4b1a=3
Evenk (Krasnoyarsk Krai)	0.041	73		B4=3
Kazakh (Kosh-Agach, Altai Republic)	0.041	98		B5b2=3, B4c1b=1
Buryat (Kushun, Nizhneudinsky, Irkutsk Oblast)	0.040	25		B4d1a=1
Kazakh (Xinjiang)	0.038	53		B4a=2
Teleut (Kemerovo Oblast)	0.038	53		B4=2
Kalmyk (Kalmykia)	0.036	110		B4=3, B5=1
Jetisu Kazakhstan	0.035	200		B4=4, B5=3
Tibetan (Chamdo, Tibet)	0.034	29		B4a=1
Buryat (Buryatia)	0.034	295		B4=9, B5=1
Lahu (Lancang, Yunnan)	0.029	35		B4(xB4a, B4b1)=1
Pumi (Ninglang, Yunnan)	0.028	36		B4(xB4a, B4b1)=1
Va (Ximeng & Gengma, Yunnan)	0.028	36		B5a=1
Yakut (Yakutia)	0.028	36		B4=1
Tharu (Morang, Nepal)	0.025	40		B5a=1
Tibetan (Deqin, Yunnan)	0.025	40		B4(xB4a, B4b1)=1
Oroqen (Oroqen Autonomous Banner)	0.023	44		B4(xB4a, B4b)=1
Uyghur (Xinjiang)	0.021	47		B(xB4, B5, B6)=1
Oirat Mongol (Xinjiang)	0.020	49		B4b1=1
Ainu	0.020	51		B4f1=1
Tuvinian (Tuva)	0.019	105		B4=2
Tibetan (Qinghai)	0.018	56		B4a=1
Nogai (Nogaysky, Dagestan & Adyge-Khabalsky, Karachay-Cherkessia)	0.015	206		B=3
Tibetan (Shannan, Tibet)	0.014	74		B4a=1
Yakut	0.012	423		B4(xB4b1)=3; B4b1=1; B5b2=1
Bashkir	0.009	221		B=2
Chukchi (Anadyr)	0.000	15		–
Uyghur (Uzbekistan/Kyrgyzstan)	0.000	16		–
Crimean Tatar (Uzbekistan/Kyrgyzstan)	0.000	20		–
Iranian (Uzbekistan/Kyrgyzstan)	0.000	20		–
Karakalpak (Uzbekistan/Kyrgyzstan)	0.000	20		–
Kazakh (Uzbekistan/Kyrgyzstan)	0.000	20		–
Kyrgyz (Uzbekistan/Kyrgyzstan)	0.000	20		–
Hindu (Chitwan, Nepal)	0.000	24		–
Nganasan	0.000	24		–
Tibetan (Diqing, Yunnan)	0.000	24		–
Kurd (northwestern Iran)	0.000	25		–
Andhra Pradesh (tribal)	0.000	29		–
Tibetan (Shigatse, Tibet)	0.000	29		–
Batak (Palawan)	0.000	31		–
Ket	0.000	38		–
Tajik (Tajikistan)	0.000	44		–
Tibetan (Lhasa, Tibet)	0.000	44		–
Evenk (Buryatia)	0.000	45		–
Udege (Gvasiugi, Imeni Lazo, Khabarovsk Krai)	0.000	46		–
Itelmen	0.000	47		–
Chuvash	0.000	55		–
Nivkh (northern Sakhalin)	0.000	56		–
Komi-Zyryans	0.000	62		–
Mansi	0.000	63		–
Chukchi	0.000	66		–
Evenk (53 Stony Tunguska basin & 18 Tuguro-Chumikan)	0.000	71		–
Tatar (Aznakayevo)	0.000	71		–
Komi-Permyaks	0.000	74		–
Siberian Eskimo	0.000	79		–
Ulchi	0.000	87		–
Mansi	0.000	98		–
Udmurt	0.000	101		–
Mordvinian	0.000	102		–
Khanty	0.000	106		–
Yakut	0.000	117		–
Tatar (Buinsk)	0.000	126		–
Mari	0.000	136		–
Koryak	0.000	155		–
Tatar	0.000	228		–

== Subclades ==
=== Tree ===
This phylogenetic tree of haplogroup B subclades is based on the paper by Mannis van Oven and Manfred Kayser Updated comprehensive phylogenetic tree of global human mitochondrial DNA variation and subsequent published research.

- B'R11'R24
  - B4'5 – China (Han from Zhanjiang, Paleolithic remains from Tianyuan Cave), the Philippines (Ivatan)
    - B4
      - B4-T16217C* – Vietnam (Lô Lô), Japan
      - B4a'g'h'i'k'm (B4-C16261T)
        - B4-C16261T* – Thailand (Lao Isan in Chaiyaphum Province), Cambodia (Takeo), Vietnam (Kinh), China (Han, Uyghur), Korea
        - B4a – Korea, Han Chinese (Denver), Tujia, Uyghur, Borneo (Bidayuh)
          - B4a1 (TMRCA 22,900 [95% CI 18,200 <-> 28,400] ybp)
            - B4a1a (TMRCA 9,700 [95% CI 9,000 <-> 10,500] ybp)
              - B4a1a* – Philippines (Ivatan, etc.), Malaysia, Papua New Guinea (Trobriand Islands), Ireland
              - B4a1a1 (A14022G, A16247G) – (TMRCA 7,000 [95% CI 6,600 <-> 7,500] ybp) Vanuatu (Port Olry), Papua New Guinea (Siwai of Bougainville) the Polynesian motif, or "PM" (though sometimes referred to as its immediate precursor)
                - B4a1a1a (16247) – (TMRCA 5,400 [95% CI 4,900 <-> 5,900] ybp) Vanuatu (Banks and Torres), Cook Islands (also sometimes referred to as "the Polynesian motif")
                  - B4a1a1a1 – Solomon Islands (Ranongga, Malaita)
                    - B4a1a1a1a – Solomon Islands (Savo)
                      - B4a1a1a1a1 – Solomon Islands (Gela, Isabel)
                    - B4a1a1a1b – Solomon Islands (Gela, Simbo)
                    - B4a1a1a1c – Papua New Guinea (Nasioi and Nagovisi of Bougainville)
                    - B4a1a1a1d – Tonga
                  - B4a1a1a2 – Solomon Islands (Choiseul), Papua New Guinea (Lihir Island)
                    - B4a1a1a2a – Solomon Islands (Malaita)
                    - B4a1a1a2b – Papua New Guinea (Buin of Bougainville)
                  - B4a1a1a3 – Solomon Islands (Malaita, Makira)
                  - B4a1a1a4 – Papua New Guinea (South Coast), Solomon Islands (Guadalcanal)
                  - B4a1a1a5 – Solomon Islands (Malaita, Ontong Java)
                  - B4a1a1a6 – Solomon Islands (Malaita, Vella Lavella)
                  - B4a1a1a7 – Solomon Islands (Bellona)
                  - B4a1a1a8 – Solomon Islands (Tikopia), Fiji
                  - B4a1a1a9 – Solomon Islands (Tikopia)
                  - B4a1a1a10 – Solomon Islands (Savo, Ranongga)
                  - B4a1a1a11 – Solomon Islands (Simbo)
                    - B4a1a1a11a – Solomon Islands (Choiseul), Vanuatu (Banks and Torres)
                    - B4a1a1a11b – Solomon Islands (Bellona), Cook Islands
                  - B4a1a1a12 – Solomon Islands (Gela, Savo)
                  - B4a1a1a13 – Solomon Islands (Choiseul), Samoa
                  - B4a1a1a14 – Papua New Guinea (Buka)
                  - B4a1a1a15 – Tonga, Wallis and Futuna (Futuna)
                  - B4a1a1a16 – Solomon Islands (Tikopia), Tonga
                  - B4a1a1a17 – Papua New Guinea (Buka, Siwai of Bougainville)
                  - B4a1a1a18 – Cook Islands
                  - B4a1a1a19 – Papua New Guinea (Lihir Island, Anem of New Britain)
                  - B4a1a1a20 – Tuvalu
                  - B4a1a1a21 – Solomon Islands (Malaita), Samoa
                  - B4a1a1a22 – Niue, Samoa
                  - B4a1a1a23 – Papua New Guinea (Torau of Bougainville), Solomon Islands (Isabel, Vella Lavella, Shortlands)
                - B4a1a1b – Madagascar (Mikea, Merina) (Malagasy motif – a Polynesian motif found only among the Malagasy people)
                - B4a1a1c – Cook Islands
                - B4a1a1d – Solomon Islands (Isabel), Papua New Guinea (Kavieng)
                - B4a1a1e – Solomon Islands (Ranongga, Malaita)
                - B4a1a1f – Solomon Islands (Guadalcanal)
                - B4a1a1g – Solomon Islands (Russell, Malaita)
                - B4a1a1h – Solomon Islands (Bellona, Rennell)
                - B4a1a1i – Solomon Islands (Ranongga, Savo)
                - B4a1a1j – Solomon Islands (Russell, Guadalcanal)
                - B4a1a1k – Tonga, Samoa
                  - B4a1a1k1 – Tonga, Samoa
                - B4a1a1m – Tonga, Samoa, Wallis and Futuna (Futuna)
                  - B4a1a1m1 – Cook Islands, Tuvalu
                - B4a1a1n – Solomon Islands (Santa Cruz), Cook Islands
                - B4a1a1o – Papua New Guinea (Madang), Solomon Islands (Tikopia), Samoa
                - B4a1a1p – Solomon Islands (Gela)
                - B4a1a1q – Indonesia (West New Guinea), Solomon Islands (Choiseul)
                - B4a1a1r – Cook Islands
                - B4a1a1s – Papua New Guinea (Torau and Nagovisi of Bougainville)
                - B4a1a1t – Samoa, Cook Islands
                - B4a1a1u – Fiji, Wallis and Futuna (Futuna)
                - B4a1a1v – Tonga, Wallis and Futuna (Futuna)
                - B4a1a1w – Papua New Guinea (Anem of New Britain)
                - B4a1a1x – Tuvalu, Micronesia (Majuro Atoll)
                - B4a1a1y – Solomon Islands (Vella Lavella)
                - B4a1a1z – Papua New Guinea (Nakanai of New Britain)
                - B4a1a1aa – Bougainville (Torau, etc.)
                - B4a1a1ab – Solomon Islands (Ontong Java), Samoa
                - B4a1a1ac – Solomon Islands (Kolombangara), Tuvalu
                - B4a1a1ad – Wallis and Futuna (Futuna)
                - B4a1a1ae – Papua New Guinea (Kavieng)
                - B4a1a1af – Papua New Guinea (Anem of New Britain)
              - B4a1a2 – Taiwan (Amis)
              - B4a1a3 – Taiwan (Ami)
                - B4a1a3a – Taiwan (Siraya)
                  - B4a1a3a1 – Philippines (Ivatan), Malaysia (Kota Kinabalu), Spain, USA
                    - B4a1a3a1a – Taiwan (Amis)
              - B4a1a4 – Philippines (Ivatan), Orchid Island (Yami)
              - B4a1a5 – Philippines, Malaysia (Kota Kinabalu)
                - B4a1a5a – Philippines (Kalangoya, Ivatan)
              - B4a1a6 – Philippines (Kalangoya, Ifugao)
                - B4a1a6a – Philippines (Kalangoya, Ibaloi)
              - B4a1a7 – Taiwan (Amis)
            - B4a1b'e (TMRCA 20,000 [95% CI 15,300 <-> 25,700] ybp)
              - B4a1b'e* – China (Naxi, Nyingchi, etc.)
              - B4a1b – Korea, Japan
                - B4a1b1 – Korea, Japan
                  - B4a1b1a – Korea, Japan
              - B4a1e – China, Taiwan (Makatao), Vietnam (Thái), Thailand (Khon Mueang in Chiang Mai Province, Lamphun Province, and Lampang Province, Tai Yuan in Northern Thailand)
            - B4a1c (TMRCA 20,200 [95% CI 15,600 <-> 25,700] ybp) – India, China (Uyghur), Vietnam (Tay), Korea, Japan
              - B4a1c1 (TMRCA 17,400 [95% CI 10,700 <-> 26,600] ybp) – Japan
                - B4a1c1a (TMRCA 13,800 [95% CI 8,200 <-> 21,800] ybp) – Japan, Korea, China
                  - B4a1c1a1 – Japan, Korea
              - B4a1c2'4'5 (TMRCA 17,100 [95% CI 11,800 <-> 23,900] ybp) – Vietnam (Cờ Lao)
                - B4a1c2 – Tuvan, Tofalar
                - B4a1c4 (TMRCA 13,400 [95% CI 11,000 <-> 16,300] ybp) – China (Mongol in Hulun Buir, Dai), Vietnam (Dao, Hà Nhì, Si La, Kinh, Nùng), Thailand (Khon Mueang in Chiang Mai Province, Phutai in Sakon Nakhon Province, Nyaw in Nakhon Phanom Province, Lao Isan in four provinces of Northeast Thailand, Shan in Mae Hong Son Province, Htin in Phayao Province, Phuan in Suphan Buri Province)
                - B4a1c5 – China (Fujian), Taiwan (Hakka)
              - B4a1c3 (TMRCA 16,100 [95% CI 10,100 <-> 24,500] ybp)
                - B4a1c3a (TMRCA 3,600 [95% CI 1,650 <-> 6,800] ybp) – Japan, Korea, Kazakh (Zhan Aul of Altai Republic), Kyrgyz (Kyrgyzstan)
                - B4a1c3b (TMRCA 11,500 [95% CI 5,600 <-> 21,200] ybp) – Japan, Korea, China
            - B4a1d – Vietnam
          - B4a2 – Japan
            - B4a2a – Indonesia (Semende of Sumatra, Banjarmasin), Philippines, Taiwan (Makatao, Hakka)
              - B4a2a1 – Orchid Island (Yami), Philippines (Ivatan)
              - B4a2a2 – Taiwan (Atayal, Saisiat)
              - B4a2a3 – Taiwan (Paiwan, Hakka)
            - B4a2b – China (Han from Beijing)
              - B4a2b1 – China, Jamaica
                - B4a2b1a – Japan
          - B4a3 – Tibet (Nagqu), Tianjin, Japan (Aichi), Iran (Fars), Kuwait
          - B4a4 – Ladakh, Northern Areas of Pakistan (Balti), Singapore, China (Han from Beijing, etc.), Korea, Russia, Germany
            - B4a4a - Yakut, Yukaghir
            - B4a4b - China
            - B4a4c - Thailand
              - B4a4c1 - Naxi, Uyghur
            - B4a4d - China
            - B4a4e - China
              - B4a4e1 - China, Taiwan
            - B4a4f - Japan
              - B4a4f1 - China
          - B4a5 – China (Han), Taiwan (Hakka), Vietnam (H'Mông, Dao, Cờ Lao)
        - B4g
          - B4g1 – Thailand (Khon Mueang in Mae Hong Son, Chiang Rai, and Lampang provinces, Phutai in Sakon Nakhon Province)
              - Vietnam (Thái, Nùng, etc.)
            - B4g1b – Han Chinese (Beijing, Denver)
          - B4g2 – Orchid Island (Tao), China (Han from Hunan), Vietnam (Cờ Lao, Dao, Si La), Thailand (Tai Dam in Kanchanaburi Province, Phutai in Sakon Nakhon Province, Lao Isan in Chaiyaphum Province, Htin in Phayao Province)
        - B4h – China, Taiwan, Vietnam, Thailand (Phuan in Sukhothai Province)
          - B4h1 – China (Fujian, etc.), Taiwan, Thailand (Tai Dam in Kanchanaburi Province), Japan
        - B4i – China
          - B4i1 – China (Han from Beijing, etc.)
        - B4k – China (Han from Beijing, etc.)
        - B4m – Korea, China, Taiwan (Minnan), Vietnam
      - B4b'd'e'j – Vietnam, Laos
        - B4b – Canada
          - B2 – Quechua, Guarani, Coreguaje, Waunana, Katuena, Ache, Gaviao, Xavante, Peru, Ecuador, Colombia, Argentina, USA (Yaqui, Hispanics, etc.), Dominican Republic
            - B2a – Northwestern Canada (Tsimshian), Mexico (Chihuahua)
              - B2a1 – USA (Jemez in New Mexico, Hispanics, etc.), Mexico
                - B2a1a – USA (Hispanics)
                  - B2a1a1 – Mexico (Chihuahua)
                - B2a1b – Mexico (Chihuahua), USA (Hispanic)
              - B2a2 – USA (New Mexico, Colorado, Mexican)
              - B2a3 – Mexico (Chihuahua, Durango), USA (Mexican)
              - B2a4
                - B2a4a – Mexico (Sinaloa)
                  - B2a4a1 – Mexico (Chihuahua, Jalisco, Durango)
              - B2a5 – Pima, USA (Arizona, Utah, California)
            - B2b – Cayapa, Pomo, Xavante, Colombia, Peru, Ecuador, Argentina
              - B2b1 – Venezuela, Ecuador (Shuar of Gualaceo)
              - B2b2 – Bolivia (Beni), Argentina (Criollo of Gran Chaco), USA (Hispanic)
                - B2b2a – Bolivia (Santa Cruz, Cochabamba)
              - B2b3 – Yanomama
                - B2b3a – Puerto Rico, Venezuela, Kayapo
              - B2b4 – USA (Mexican)
            - B2c – Ecuador, USA (Hispanic), ancient Canada, modern Canada
              - B2c1 – Mexico (Mixe), USA (Hispanic, Mexican)
                - B2c1a – USA (Mexican, Hispanic)
                - B2c1b – USA (Hispanic, Mexican)
                - B2c1c – USA (Mexican)
              - B2c2 – USA (Mexican)
                - B2c2a – USA (Mexican, Hispanic)
                - B2c2b – USA (Mexican, Hispanic)
            - B2d – Nicaragua (Chinandega), Ngöbe/Guaymi, Wayuu, Colombia, USA (Hispanic in New Jersey)
            - B2e – Colombia, Argentina, Waiwai
            - B2f – USA (Mexican)
            - B2g
              - B2g1 – Mexico, USA (Yaqui, Mexican, Hispanic)
              - B2g2
            - B2h – Ache
            - B2i
              - B2i1 – Kayapo
              - B2i2 – Chile
                - B2i2a – Mapuche
                  - B2i2a1 – Chile
                    - B2i2a1a – Chile, Argentina
                    - B2i2a1b – Chile
                - B2i2b – Chile
                  - B2i2b1 – Chile
            - B2j
            - B2k – Venezuela, USA (Mexican)
            - B2l – Venezuela, Ecuador
            - B2m
            - B2n
            - B2o – Colombia, Mexico (Maya), USA (Hispanic in Arizona)
              - B2o1 – Ecuador, Bolivia
                - B2o1a – Colombia, Bolivia, Peru
            - B2p – USA (Mexican)
            - B2q – Ecuador, USA (Mexican)
            - B2r – USA (Hispanic, Mexican)
            - B2s – USA (Mexican)
            - B2t – Guatemala (Maya, la Tinta)
            - B2u
            - B2v
            - B2w
            - B2x
            - B2y – South America (Andes), Peru
              - B2y1 – USA
          - B4b1
            - B4b1* – Thailand (Phuan in Phrae Province), Korea, Japan
            - B4b1a
              - B4b1a* – China, Tubalar, Philippines, Indonesia
              - B4b1a-G207A (TMRCA 14,900 [95% CI 11,200 <-> 19,400] ybp) – Japan
                - B4b1a1 (TMRCA 3,000 [95% CI 2,100 <-> 4,200] ybp) – Japan
                  - B4b1a1a – Japan, Korea
                  - B4b1a1b – Japan
                  - B4b1a1c – Japan, Korea
                - B4b1a2 (TMRCA 11,900 [95% CI 10,300 <-> 13,600] ybp) – Japan, Korea, China (Fujian), Taiwan, Philippines (Aeta of Bataan, etc.), Indonesia, Thailand (Khon Mueang in Lampang Province), India
                  - B4b1a2a – Thailand (Khon Mueang in Chiang Mai, Lamphun, and Lampang provinces, Phutai in Sakon Nakhon Province, Tai Dam in Loei Province, Lao Isan in Ubon Ratchathani Province), Vietnam (Gelao), China (Han from Zhanjiang), Korea, Japan
                  - B4b1a2b – Taiwan (Ami)
                    - B4b1a2b1 – Philippines (Maranao, Manobo)
                    - B4b1a2b2 – Taiwan (Bunun, Makatao)
                  - B4b1a2c – Philippines (Mamanwa)
                  - B4b1a2d – Philippines (Surigaonon)
                  - B4b1a2e – China (She people, etc.)
                  - B4b1a2f – Taiwan (Bunun, Tsou)
                  - B4b1a2g – Taiwan (Bunun)
                    - B4b1a2g1 – Taiwan (Bunun)
                  - B4b1a2h – Taiwan (Ami)
                  - B4b1a2i
                    - B4b1a2i* – Tuvalu, Banjar (Banjarmasin)
                    - B4b1a2i1
                      - B4b1a2i1*
                      - B4b1a2i1a
                        - B4b1a2i1a* – Nauru, Kiribati
                          - B4b1a2i1a1 – Tuvalu
                    - B4b1a2i2 – Solomon Islands (Guadalcanal)
                - B4b1a3 (TMRCA 7,300 [95% CI 4,600 <-> 11,000] ybp) – Han Chinese (Denver)
                  - B4b1a3* – Hazara (Pakistan)
                  - B4b1a3a (TMRCA 3,300 [95% CI 2,100 <-> 4,900] ybp)
                    - B4b1a3a* – Turk, Altai Kizhi, Shor, Uyghur, Yakut
                    - B4b1a3a1 – Khamnigan, Buryat, Barghut
                    - B4b1a3a2 – Khamnigan
                    - B4b1a3a3 – Chuvash
                  - B4b1a3b
                    - B4b1a3b* – Buryat
                    - B4b1a3b1 – Uyghur
            - B4b1b'c
              - B4b1b – Japan, Korean, China (Lanzhou), Vietnam
              - B4b1c – China, Taiwan, South Korea, Japan (TMRCA 14,900 [95% CI 9,800 <-> 21,700] ybp)
                - B4b1c1 – Vietnam (Kinh, Tày, Nùng), Thailand, China, Japan (TMRCA 7,200 [95% CI 4,500 <-> 10.800] ybp)
                - B4b1c2 – Mongol (New Barag Left Banner), China, Taiwan (Hakka), Japan (TMRCA 12,900 [95% CI 7,800 <-> 20,100] ybp)
        - B4d
          - B4d1'2'3
            - B4d1'2'3* – Russia (Buryat), China (Oroqen, Tibetan from Tingri, etc.), Korea
            - B4d1 – China (Miao, Daur from Qiqihar, Korean from Antu County, Han from Fengcheng, Lanzhou, Jiangsu, etc.), Taiwan, Japan (Chiba), conqueror period Hungary (three specimens from the Karos-III site)
              - B4d1a – Han Chinese (Denver), Barghut (Hulun Buir)
            - B4d2 – China (Han from Qingdao)
            - B4d3 – China (Han from Beijing, etc.)
              - B4d3a – China, Italy (TMRCA 8,300 [95% CI 4,700 <-> 13,500] ybp)
                - B4d3a1 – Japan (Aichi, Ibaraki, etc.), Korea
          - B4d4 – Japan (Chiba, etc.)
        - B4e – Thailand (Phuan in Lopburi, Sukhothai, and Phrae provinces, Tai Yuan in Uttaradit Province), Laos (Lao in Vientiane), Vietnam (La Hủ), China, Japan (Tokyo)
        - B4j – Buryat, Khamnigan
      - B4c – Thailand, Indonesia
        - B4c1
          - B4c1a'b
            - B4c1a – China (Shandong, Lanzhou, Deng people, Sarikoli in Tashkurgan), Vietnam (La Hủ) (TMRCA 18,000 [95% CI 12,600 <-> 25,000] ybp)
              - B4c1a1 – Japan (Tokyo, Aichi), Korea (South Jeolla) (TMRCA 12,000 [95% CI 8,300 <-> 16,700] ybp)
                - B4c1a1a – Japan (Chiba, Aichi), Korea
                  - B4c1a1a1 – Japan (Tokyo), Korea
                    - B4c1a1a1a – Japan (Aichi, etc.)
                  - B4c1a1a2 – Japan (Aichi)
                - B4c1a1b – Japan (Tokyo, etc.), Korea
                - B4c1a1c – Japan (Tokyo, etc.)
              - B4c1a2 – Barghut, Buryat, Yakut (TMRCA 11,700 [95% CI 6,000 <-> 20,600] ybp)
                - B4c1a2a – Barghut (Hulun Buir), Khamnigan, Kyrgyz (Artux) (TMRCA 3,200 [95% CI 700 <-> 9,300] ybp)
            - B4c1b - Japan (Aichi), Vietnam (Kinh), Thailand
              - B4c1b1
                - B4c1b1* – Japan (Tokyo), Korea, USA
                - B4c1b1a – Japan (Tokyo)
              - B4c1b-A16335G
                - B4c1b-C5246A/T14502C/G16310A
                  - B4c1b-C5246A/T14502C/G16310A* – Vietnam (Tay, Kinh)
                  - B4c1b-C2380T
                    - B4c1b-C2380T* – Japan (Chiba)
                    - B4c1b-A200G/G16145A/C16189TC – Uyghur
                - B4c1b2 - Poland
                  - B4c1b2a – Thailand (Khon Mueang in Lampang Province), China (Han from Fengcheng, Lanzhou, etc.), Kazakh (Altai)
                    - B4c1b2a1 – China (Zhejiang, etc.), Uyghur, Japan
                    - B4c1b2a2 – Indonesia (Besemah of Sumatra), Philippines (Ivatan), South Africa, China
                      - B4c1b2a2a – Philippines (Ivatan), Orchid Island (Yami)
                      - B4c1b2a2b – Philippines (Ivatan)
                  - B4c1b2b – Taiwan (Minnan), Han Chinese (Denver)
                  - B4c1b2c – China, Han Chinese (Denver), Taiwan, Vietnam (Phù Lá, Tay), Cambodia (Siem Reap), Laos (Lao in Vientiane), Hazara (Pakistan)
                    - B4c1b2c1 – China (Han from Beijing), Taiwan (Minnan), Japan
                    - B4c1b2c2 – China, Taiwan (Hakka, etc.), Vietnam (Kinh, La Hủ), Thailand (Khon Mueang in Chiang Mai Province)
              - B4c1b3
                - B4c1b3* – Japan (Aichi)
                - B4c1b3a – Northern Thailand (Khon Mueang in Chiang Mai Province and Lamphun Province)
          - B4c1c
            - B4c1c* – China, Korea, Japan
            - B4c1c-T16311C!
              - B4c1c-T16311C!* – China, Japan
              - B4c1c1 – Japan, Korea, Singapore, Kyrgyzstan
                - B4c1c1a – Japan, Korea
                - B4c1c1b - Japan
        - B4c2
          - B4c2* – Thailand (Tai Lü in Northern Thailand, Thai in Western Thailand, Phuan in Phichit, Lopburi, and Sukhothai provinces, Lao Isan in Ubon Ratchathani Province, Saek in Nakhon Phanom Province, Soa in Sakon Nakhon Province), Laos (Lao in Luang Prabang), Indonesia (Banjar of Banjarmasin, Besemah of Sumatra, Jawa Timur), USA ("Caucasian"), Vietnam (La Hủ, Hà Nhì), Cambodia (Siem Reap, Battambang, Banteay Meanchey)
          - B4c2a
            - B4c2a* – Thai
            - B4c2a1 – Uzbek, Uyghur, China
          - B4c2b – Vietnam (Cham), Cambodia (Kampong Thom), Malaysia (Seletar), Indonesia (Banjar from Banjarmasin), Netherlands
          - B4c2c – Thailand (Thai in Eastern Thailand, Tai Khün in Northern Thailand, Tai Lü in Northern Thailand), Laos (Lao from Luang Prabang), Cambodia (Kampong Thom), Vietnam (Tày, Nùng, Dao), Taiwan (Minnan), China (Tu, etc.)
          - B4c2d – Cambodia (Kampong Thom, Kratié)
          - B4c2e – Vietnam (La Hu)
          - B4c2f – Vietnam (Kinh), Thailand (Phuan)
          - B4c2g – Thailand (Phuan)
        - B4c3
          - B4c3* – China
          - B4c3a
            - B4c3a* – Vietnam (La Chí)
            - B4c3a1 – Vietnam (La Chí)
          - B4c3b – Vietnam (Lô Lô)
          - B4c3c – Vietnam (La Hủ)
      - B4f – Japan (Japanese, Ryukyuan, Ainu, late 3–4th century AD (early Kofun period) Yokohama)
        - B4f* – Vietnam (Lô Lô), Japan (Aichi)
        - B4f1 - Barghut, Korea
          - B4f1* – Japan (Tokyo)
          - B4f1a – Japan (Tokyo, etc.)
    - B5
      - B5* – China
      - B5a – Thailand (Tai Dam from Kanchanaburi Province), Vietnam (Kinh), China (Han), Taiwan (Hakka), Philippines (Agta of Iriga)
        - B5a1 – Thailand (Tai Yuan from Ratchaburi Province, Blang from Chiang Rai Province, Lao Isan from Chaiyaphum Province, Nyaw from Nakhon Phanom Province, Tai Dam from Kanchanaburi Province, Phuan from Sukhothai Province, Soa from Sakon Nakhon Province), Indonesia (Besemah of Sumatra), Vietnam, China
          - B5a1a – Cambodia, Vietnam (Kinh, Gelao), Laos, Thailand, Indonesia, Philippines(Besemah and Kutaradja of Sumatra), China, Uyghur, Taiwan (Minnan), Philippines, India
            - B5a1a1 – Nicobar Islands
          - B5a1b – China (Han from Wuhan), Philippines, Vietnam Malaysia Iran
            - B5a1b1 – Cambodia (Jarai), Indonesia, Philippines, Taiwan, Thailand (Bru from Sakon Nakhon Province, Phuan from Sukhothai Province and Lopburi Province, Tai Yuan from Uttaradit Province, Khon Mueang from Mae Hong Son Province and Chiang Mai Province, Tai Dam from Kanchanaburi Province, Soa from Sakon Nakhon Province, Nyaw from Nakhon Phanom Province, Saek from Nakhon Phanom Province), Laos (Lao from Luang Prabang and Vientiane), China, Korea
          - B5a1c – China, Taiwan (Minnan), Thailand (Kaleun from Nakhon Phanom Province), Guyana Philippines, Malaysia, Indonesia cabodian, Thailand vietnam
            - B5a1c1 – China, Taiwan (Minnan), Laos (Lao from Luang Prabang)
              - B5a1c1a – Han Chinese
                - B5a1c1a1 – China (Han from Hunan, etc.)
            - B5a1c2 – China (Han)
          - B5a1d – China, Thailand, Laos, Cambodia, Indonesia (Semende of Sumatra)
        - B5a2 – China (Han from Hunan)
          - B5a2a
            - B5a2a1
              - B5a2a1a – China
              - B5a2a1b – Korea, Japan (Tokyo, Chiba)
            - B5a2a2
              - B5a2a2* – China
              - B5a2a2a
                - B5a2a2a1 – Taiwan (Paiwan, Rukai)
                - B5a2a2a2 – Taiwan (Saisiyat, Rukai)
              - B5a2a2b
                - B5a2a2b1 – Philippines (Ivatan)
                  - B5a2a2b1a – Taiwan (Bunun)
                - B5a2a2b2 – Taiwan (Makatao)
      - B5b – Korea, China, Uyghur, Kyrgyz
        - B5b1 – China, Tibet, Buryat (Inner Mongolia), Korea, Japan (Tokyo, etc.), Thailand (Suay from Surin Province), Cambodia (Lao), Vietnam, Singapore
          - B5b1a – China, Thailand

(Shan from Mae Hong Son Province), Japan cabodian, Thailand Malaysia, Philippines, Indonesia, vietnam

            - B5b1a1 – Japan (Tokyo, Aichi)
            - B5b1a2 – Japan (Tokyo)
              - B5b1a2a – Japan (Chiba, Tokyo)
            - B5b1b - Cabodian, South chinese, Thailand, Vietnam, Malaysia Indonesia, Philippines,
          - B5b1c – Philippines (Ivatan, etc.), Solomon Islands (Isabel, Santa Cruz), Malaysia (Jawa, Batek), Singapore, Yemen, Indonesia, Cambodian, Thailand, Vietnam
            - B5b1c1 – Philippines (Kalangoya, Ifugao, Ibaloi, Kankanaey)
              - B5b1c1a – Philippines (Kankanaey, Ifugao, Kalangoya, Ibaloi, Abaknon)
        - B5b2 – Russia (Russian old settler in Pokhosk Village of Sakha Republic, Ulchi, Altaian Kazakh), China (Han, Uyghur, Barghut), Japan, Philippines
          - B5b2a – Negidal, Khamnigan, Philippines, Malaysia Indonesia south chinese, cabodian, Thailand, Vietnam
            - B5b2a1 – Japan (Aichi, Tokyo, etc.), China (Han from Wuhan)
            - B5b2a2 – Japan (Tokyo, etc.), Korea, China (Tianjin), Buryat, Hezhen
              - B5b2a2a
                - B5b2a2a1 – Japan (Tokyo, Chiba, Aichi)
                - B5b2a2a2 – Malaysia (Bidayuh of Sarawak), Philippines, Solomon Islands (Ranongga)
          - B5b2b – Yakut, Philippines, Malaysia, Indonesia, sigapore, cabodian, Thailand, Vietnam
          - B5b2-C204T! - China (Han), Korea, Vietnam (Kinh)
            - B5b2c – Taiwan (Minnan, Makatao)Philippines Malaysia Cambodian south chinese thailand, vietnam, Indonesia
              - B5b2c1 – China (Han from Hunan), Japan (Chiba, Aichi)
        - B5b3
          - B5b3a – Japan (Aichi, early 11th century AD (Heian period) Yokohama, etc.), Korea, China
          - B5b3b – Japan Philippines
        - B5b4 – China, Altai Kizhi Philippines
        - B5b5 – Taiwan (Hakka), Han (Denver) Philippines Malaysia Indonesia
  - R11'B6
    - R11 – China (Han from Beijing)
      - R11a – Japan, China
      - R11b – China (Han from Qingdao, etc.), Tibet (Tingri), Korea, Japan
        - R11b1 – China (Han from Hunan)
          - R11b1c - Altai Kizhi
        - R11b2 - China, Xibo
          - R11b2a - China, Thailand (Khmer from Surin Province), Vietnam (Kinh)
        - R11b3 - China (Taihang area in Henan province)
        - R11b4 - China (Han from Chongqing)
    - B6
      - B6a – China (Han from Tai'an), Thailand (Htin in Phayao Province, Palaung and Khon Mueang in Chiang Mai Province, Phuan in Phrae Province and Sukhothai Province, Mon in Ratchaburi Province and Lopburi Province, Tai Dam in Kanchanaburi Province)
        - B6a1 – China, Thailand (Khon Mueang in Lampang Province, Htin in Phayao Province, Blang in Chiang Rai Province), Philippines
          - B6a1a – Myanmar, Thailand (Lawa and Shan in Mae Hong Son Province, Khon Mueang in Chiang Mai Province), Malaysia (Temuan)
  - R24 – Philippines (Mamanwa)
    - R24a – Philippines

== Popular culture ==
In his popular book The Seven Daughters of Eve, Bryan Sykes named the originator of this mtDNA haplogroup Ina.

== See also ==
- Genealogical DNA test
- Genetic genealogy
- Human mitochondrial genetics
- Population genetics
- Indigenous Amerindian genetics

Phylogenetic tree of human mitochondrial DNA (mtDNA) haplogroups

Mitochondrial Eve (L)

L0
L1–6

L1
L2

L3

L4
L5
L6
M
N

CZ
D
E
G
Q

O
A
S
R

I
W
X
Y
C
Z
B
F
R0

pre-JT

P

U
HV
JT
K
H
V
J
T
