= Adyge-Khabl =

Rural locality in the Karachay-Cherkess Republic, Russia

Coordinates: 44°19′52″N 41°56′05″E

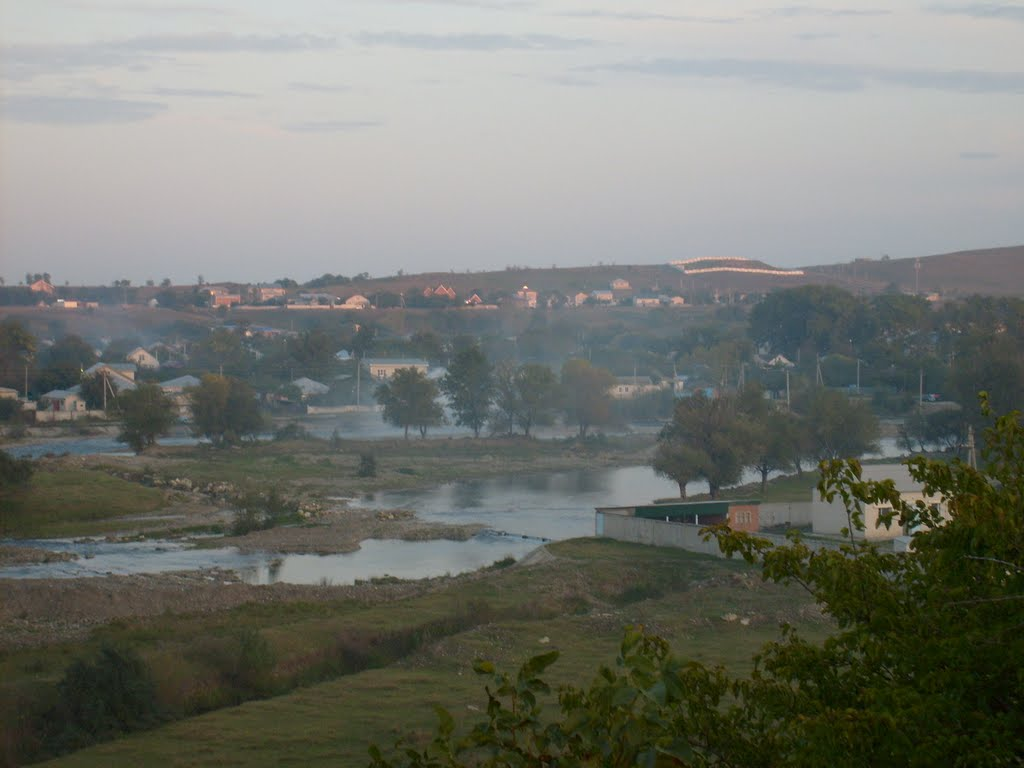
Adyge-Khabl

Adyge-Khabl (Russian: Адыге-Хабль; Kabardian: Адыгэ-Хьэблэ; Abaza: Адыгьа-ХӀабльа; Karachay-Balkar: Адыге-Хабль, Adıge-Xabl) is a rural locality (an aul) and the administrative center of Adyge-Khablsky District of the Karachay-Cherkess Republic, Russia. Population: 3,946 (2010 census); 3,650 (2002 census); 3,775 (1989 Soviet census). The postal code is 369330.

== Demographics ==
In 2002, the population comprised the following ethnic groups:

- Cherkess (49.4%)
- Nogais (18.2%)
- Russians (12.4%)
- Abazins (9.0%)
- Karachays (2.0%)
- Others (9%)
