= Deqin County =

Deqin County 德钦县 • བདེ་ཆེན་རྫོང་
- County
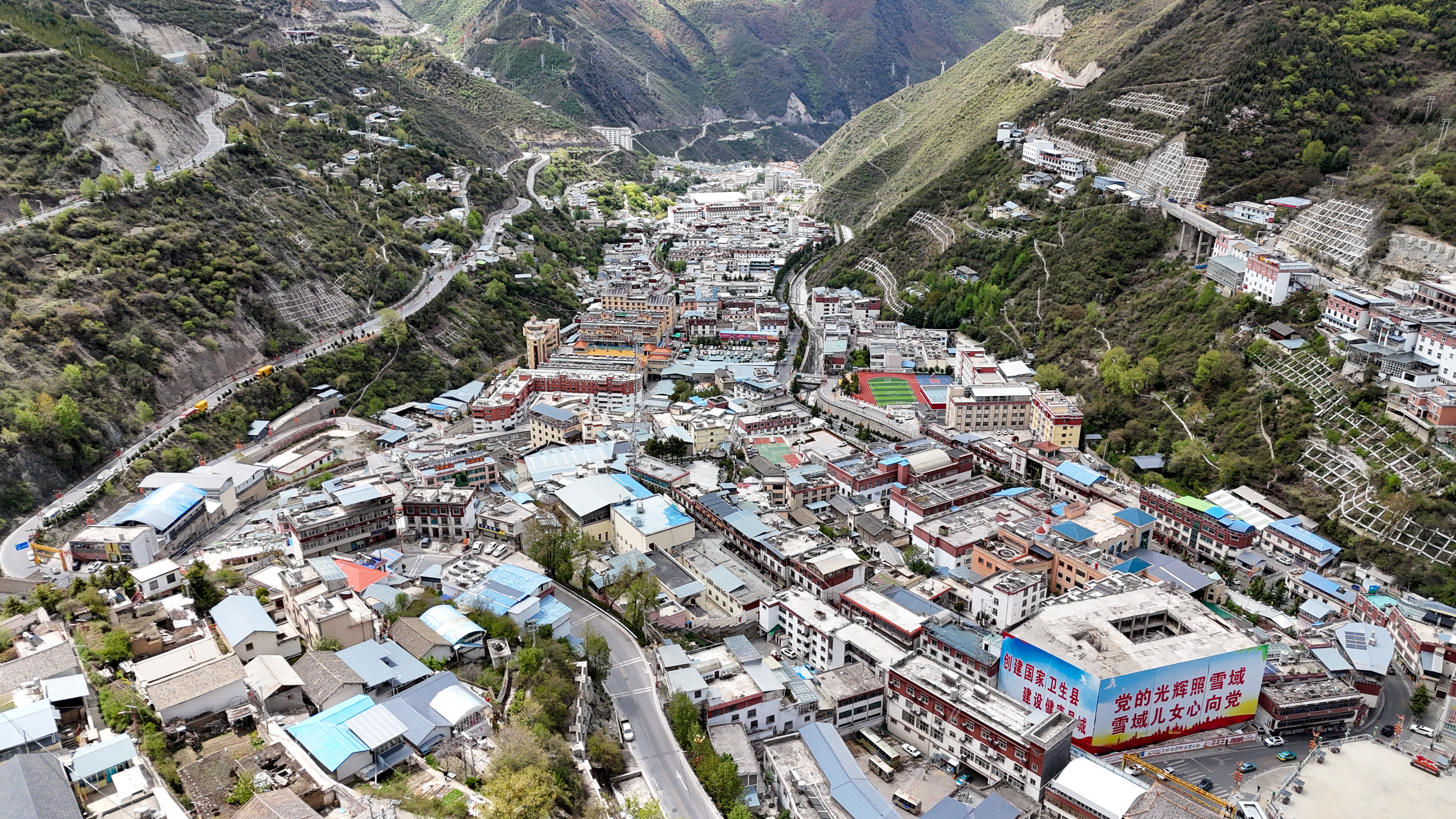
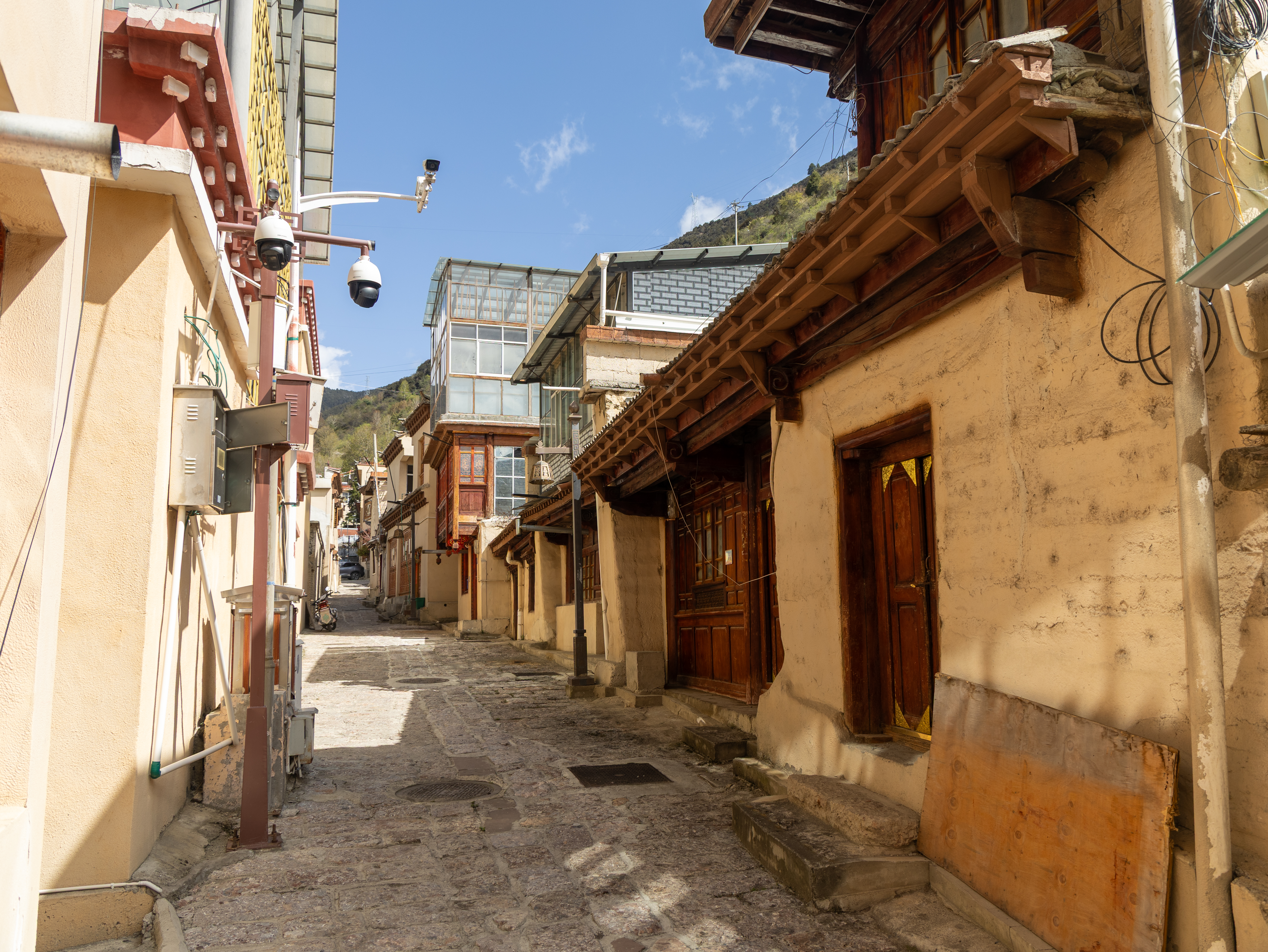
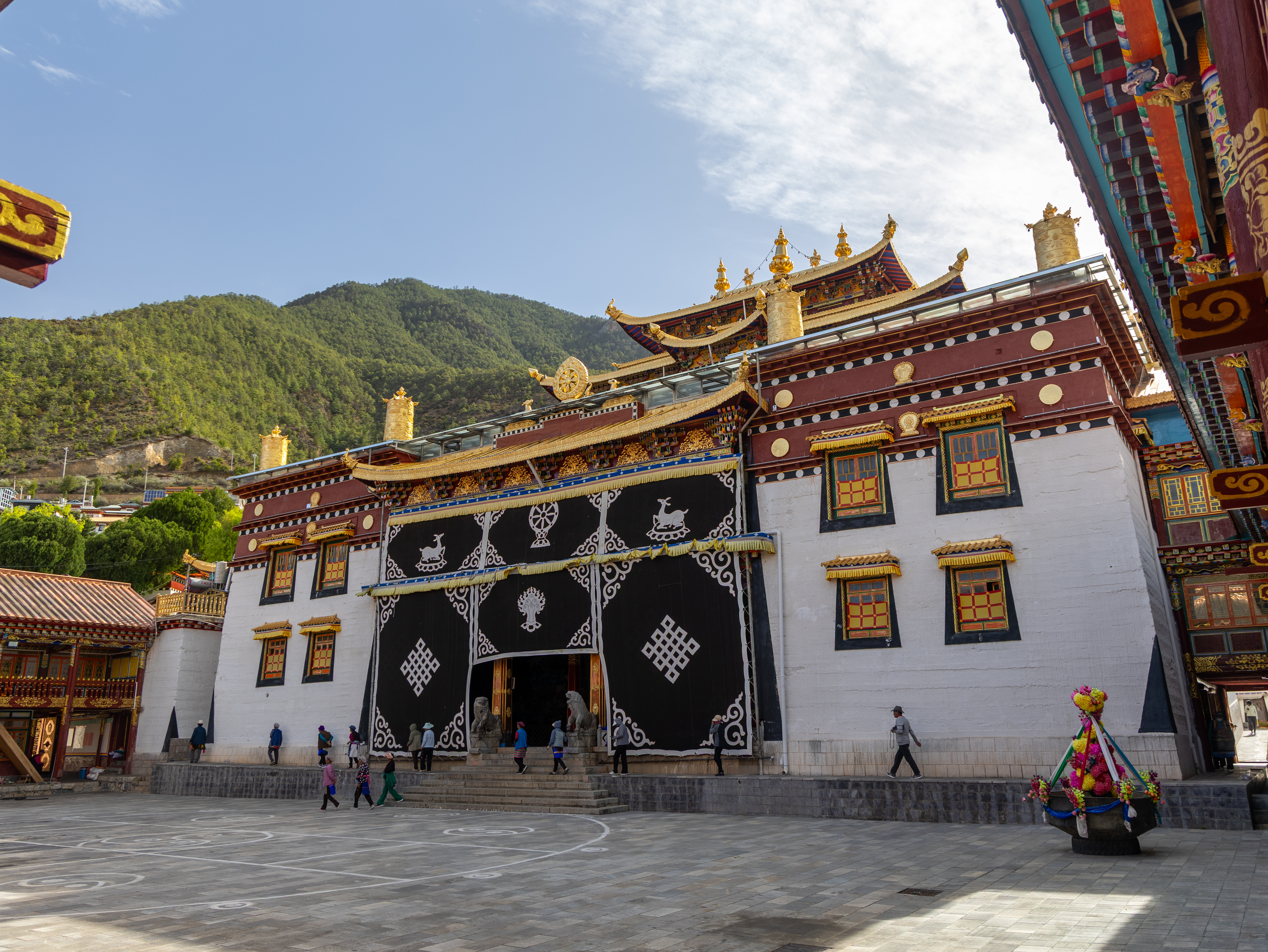
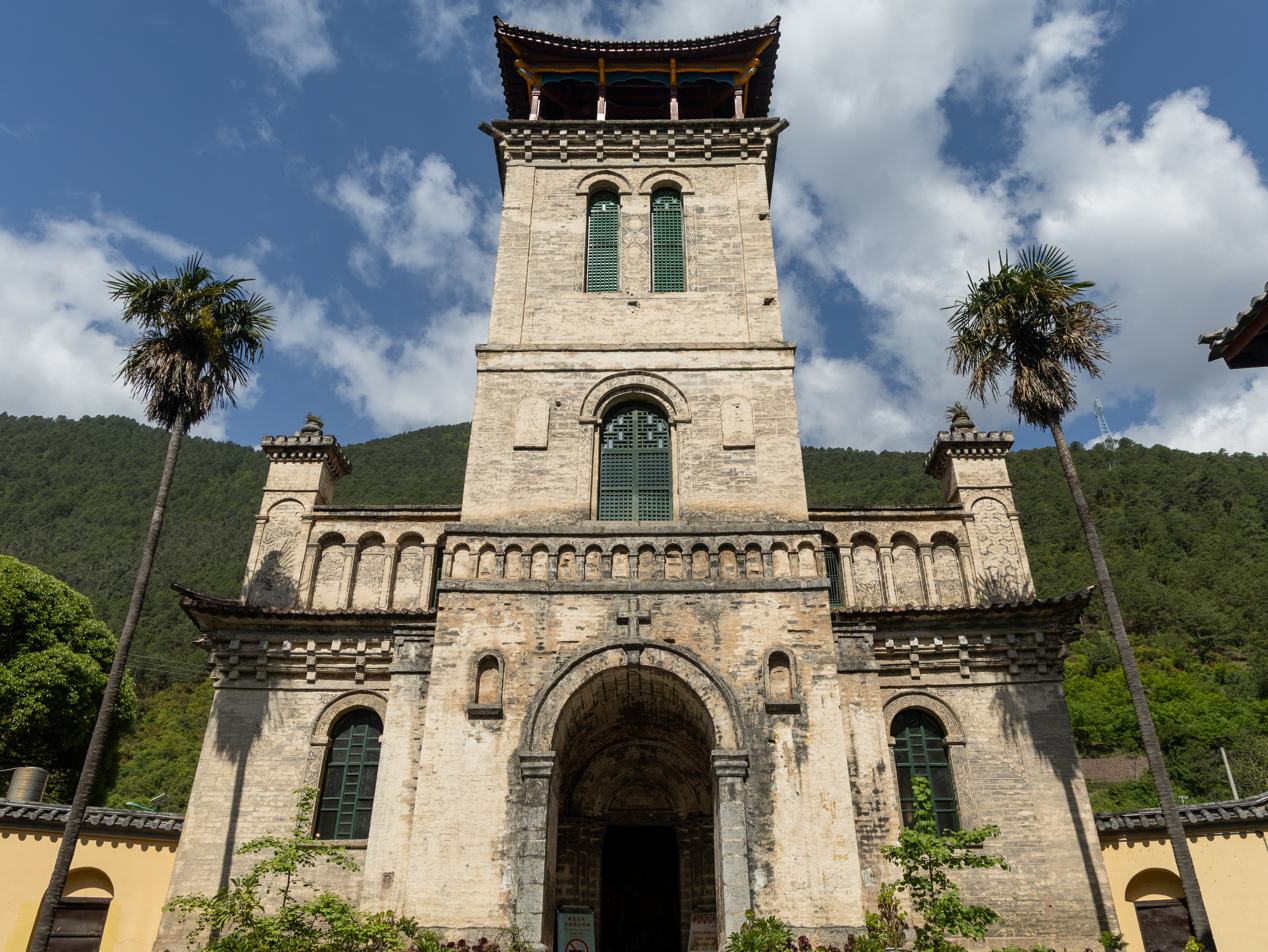
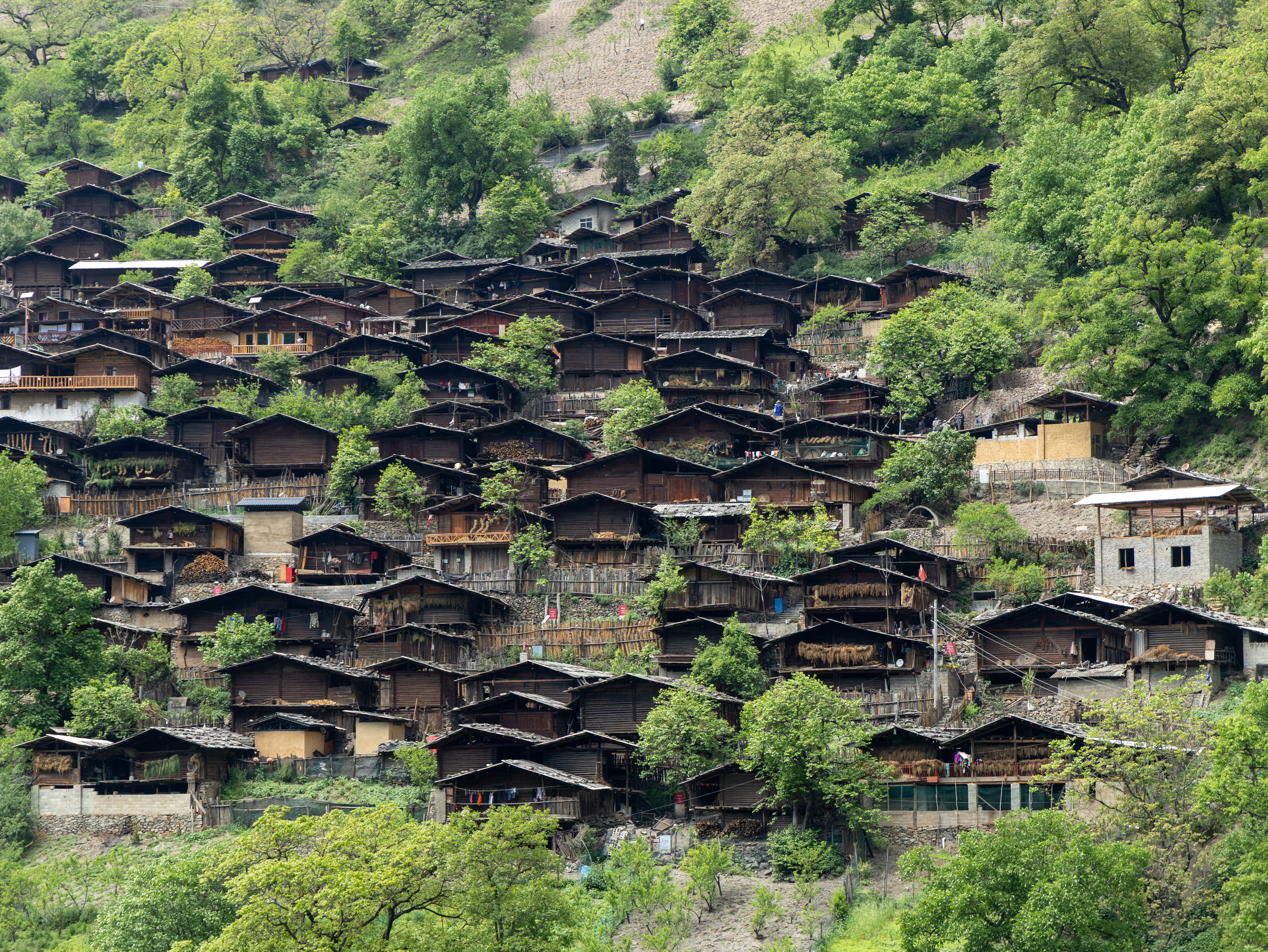
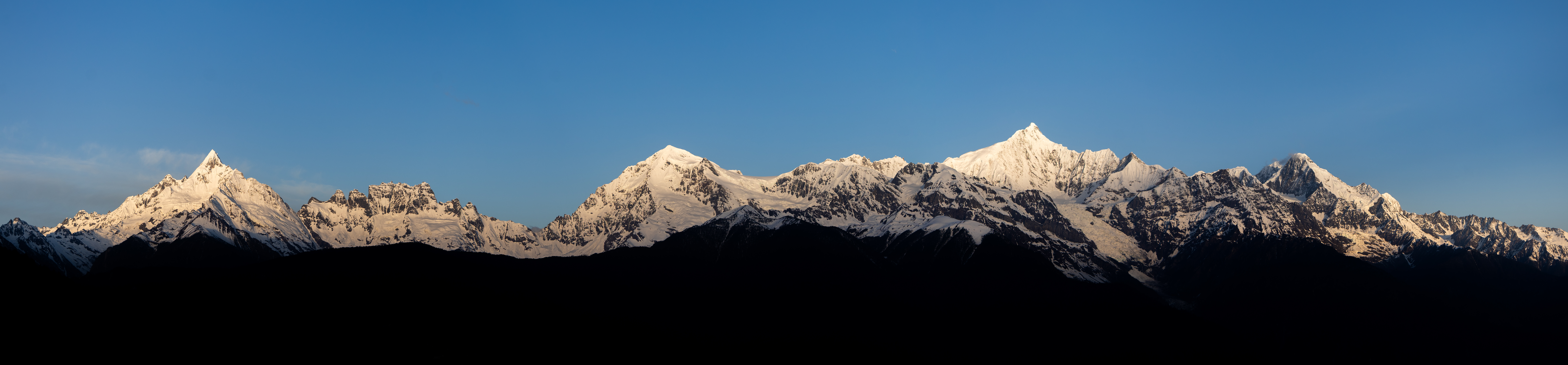
- Skyline of county town Adunzi old town Dongzhulin Monastery Tsedro Sacred Heart Church Tongle Lisu Traditional Residence Meili Snow Mountain
- Etymology: From Tibetan བདེ་ཆེན (dêqên), meaning "auspicious place"
- Location of Deqin County (red) within Diqing Prefecture (pink) and Yunnan

- Location in Yunnan
- Coordinates: 28°12′N 98°59′E
- Country: China
- Province: Yunnan
- Autonomous prefecture: Diqing
- County seat: Deqen

Area
  - Total: 7,596 km^{2} (2,933 sq mi)
- Elevation: 3,300 m (10,800 ft)

Population (2020 census)
  - Total: 54,736
  - Density: 7.206/km^{2} (18.66/sq mi)
- Time zone: UTC+8 (China Standard)
- Postal code: 674500
- Area code: 0887
- Website: deqin.diqing.gov.cn

Deqin County

Chinese name
- Simplified Chinese: 德钦县
- Traditional Chinese: 德欽縣
Transcriptions
Standard Mandarin
- Hanyu Pinyin: Déqīn Xiàn

Tibetan name
- Tibetan: བདེ་ཆེན་རྫོང་
Transcriptions
- Wylie: bde chen rdzong
- Tibetan Pinyin: Dêqên Zong

Deqin County (Note: Chinese: 德钦县; pinyin: Déqīn Xiàn; Tibetan: བདེ་ཆེན་རྫོང་, ZWPY: Dêqên Zong) is county of Diqing Tibetan Autonomous Prefecture, located in northwest Yunnan province, China.

== Etymology ==
The prefecture's name is derived from the Tibetan word བདེ་ཆེན (dêqên), which means "auspicious place". In Chinese, the name is written with the characters 德 (dé) and 钦 (qīn), which mean "benevolence" and "to respect", respectively.

== Geography and climate ==
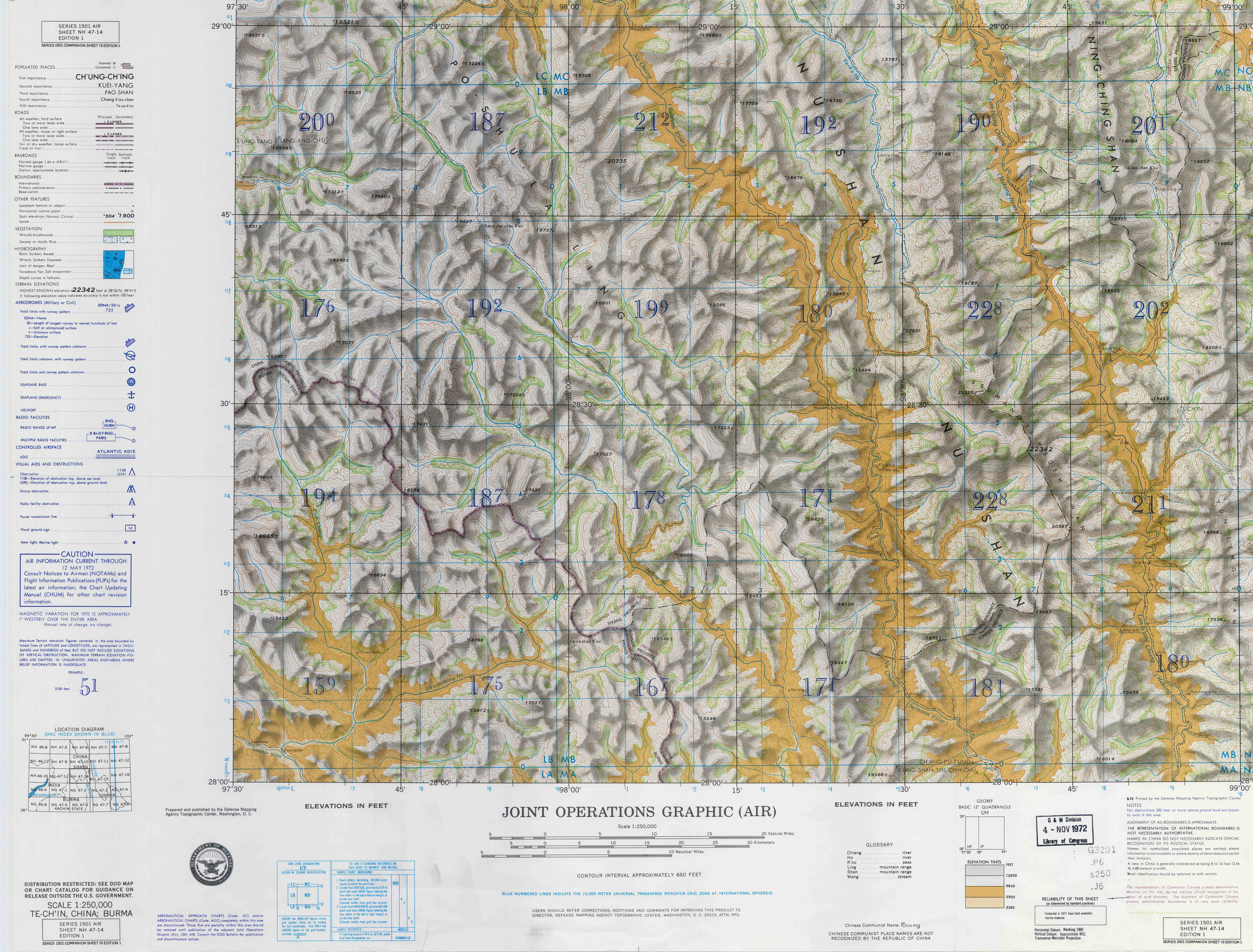

Deqin occupies the northwest corner of Diqing Prefecture, and in latitude has a range of 27° 33'−29° 15' N and in longitude has a range of 98° 36'−99° 33' E, covering an area of 7,596 square kilometres (2,933 sq mi), bordering Markam County, Zogang County and Zayu County of the Tibet Autonomous Region to the northwest, Weixi County and Gongshan County to the southwest, Batang County and Derong County of Sichuan across the Jinsha River to the northeast, and Shangri-La City to the east. It is located in the central part of the Hengduan Mountains, and contains the valleys of the Salween, Mekong, and Jinsha Rivers.

Being located at an altitude of 3,300 metres (10,800 ft), Deqin lies in the transition between a subtropical highland climate (Köppen Cwb) and humid continental climate (Köppen Dwb), which is remarkable for its latitude. Although mean maximum temperatures, as in Lhasa and Shigatse, stay above freezing year-round, minima are below freezing from November to March, and temperatures average −1.4 °C (29.5 °F) in January, 13.6 °C (56.5 °F) in July, while the annual mean is 6.32 °C (43.4 °F). The town is nonetheless a little warmer during the winter than Shangri-La County to the east despite being slightly higher in elevation, due to its more southerly aspect. Rainfall is concentrated between June and September, accounting for nearly 60% of the annual total of 640 mm (25.2 in); snowfall is rare but still causes major transport problems in the winter. With monthly percent possible sunshine ranging from 29% in July to 62% in December, the county seat receives 1,989 hours of bright sunshine annually, with autumn and winter sunnier than spring and summer.

Climate data for Deqin County, elevation 3,319 m (10,889 ft), (1991–2020 normals, extremes 1953–present)
Month	Jan	Feb	Mar	Apr	May	Jun	Jul	Aug	Sep	Oct	Nov	Dec	Year
Record high °C (°F)	16.7 (62.1)	20.6 (69.1)	23.1 (73.6)	30.4 (86.7)	33.6 (92.5)	33.8 (92.8)	34.2 (93.6)	26.7 (80.1)	26.7 (80.1)	23.7 (74.7)	18.6 (65.5)	14.9 (58.8)	34.2 (93.6)
Mean daily maximum °C (°F)	5.9 (42.6)	6.8 (44.2)	8.6 (47.5)	11.8 (53.2)	15.9 (60.6)	19.2 (66.6)	19.2 (66.6)	19.1 (66.4)	17.7 (63.9)	14.3 (57.7)	10.5 (50.9)	7.4 (45.3)	13.0 (55.5)
Daily mean °C (°F)	−1.5 (29.3)	0.0 (32.0)	2.3 (36.1)	5.5 (41.9)	9.6 (49.3)	13.2 (55.8)	13.7 (56.7)	13.2 (55.8)	11.8 (53.2)	7.3 (45.1)	2.7 (36.9)	−0.5 (31.1)	6.4 (43.6)
Mean daily minimum °C (°F)	−6.4 (20.5)	−4.7 (23.5)	−1.9 (28.6)	1.1 (34.0)	5.0 (41.0)	9.2 (48.6)	10.5 (50.9)	10.2 (50.4)	8.7 (47.7)	3.4 (38.1)	−1.8 (28.8)	−5.4 (22.3)	2.3 (36.2)
Record low °C (°F)	−13.6 (7.5)	−14.7 (5.5)	−10.5 (13.1)	−7.9 (17.8)	−2.7 (27.1)	−0.5 (31.1)	3.5 (38.3)	2.0 (35.6)	−0.1 (31.8)	−5.6 (21.9)	−11.5 (11.3)	−13.1 (8.4)	−14.7 (5.5)
Average precipitation mm (inches)	8.2 (0.32)	16.7 (0.66)	54.7 (2.15)	62.8 (2.47)	64.6 (2.54)	61.5 (2.42)	142.1 (5.59)	116.2 (4.57)	62.5 (2.46)	43.4 (1.71)	17.4 (0.69)	4.0 (0.16)	654.1 (25.74)
Average precipitation days (≥ 0.1 mm)	6.4	9.3	14.4	14.2	13.4	15.3	22.3	21.3	14.5	9.4	4.9	2.3	147.7
Average snowy days	9.7	13.1	15.6	5.8	0.6	0	0	0	0.1	0.9	5.1	4.6	55.5
Average relative humidity (%)	55	61	68	70	71	75	81	83	81	74	63	54	70
Mean monthly sunshine hours	169.3	157.2	162.9	155.5	166.1	146.1	116.9	129.4	138.5	172.5	174.8	175.8	1,865
Percentage possible sunshine	52	49	44	40	39	35	28	32	38	49	55	55	43
Source 1: China Meteorological Administrationextremesall-time November record high
Source 2: Weather China

== Administrative divisions ==
Deqin County has 2 towns, 4 townships and 2 ethnic townships.

Name	Simplified Chinese	Hanyu Pinyin	Tibetan	Wylie	Administrative division code
Towns
Deqen Town (Shengping)	升平镇	Shēngpíng zhèn	བདེ་ཆེན་གྲོང་རྡལ།	bde chen grong rdal	533422101
Gongzêra Town (Benzilan)	奔子栏镇	Bēnzǐlán zhèn	ཀོང་རྩེད་ར་གྲོང་རྡལ།	kong rtsed ra grong rdal	533422102
Towns
Foshan Township	佛山乡	Fóshān xiāng			53342220
Yunling Township	云岭乡	Yúnlǐng xiāng			53342221
Yanmen Township	燕门乡	Yànmén xiāng			53342223
Yagra Township (Yala)	羊拉乡	Yánglā xiāng	གཡག་རྭ་ཤང་།	g.yag rwa shang	53342226
Ethnic townships
Tangdoi Lisu Ethnic Township (Tuoding)	拖顶傈僳族乡	Tuōdǐng Lìsùzú xiāng	ཐང་སྟོད་ལི་སུའུ་རིགས་ཤང་།	thang stod li su'u rigs shang	533422204
Zhag'o Lisu Ethnic Township (Xiaruo)	霞若傈僳族乡	Xiáruò Lìsùzú xiāng	ག་འོག་ལི་སུའུ་རིགས་ཤང་།	brag 'og li su'u rigs shang	533422205

== Demographics ==
The Tibetans of Deqin, compared to Tibetans in Tibet, have had longer-lasting trade relations with the Han Chinese and other ethnic groups.

== Composition ==
Meilishi (梅里石) is in Foshan Township, in the northernmost part of the county.

== Transportation ==
- China National Highway 214

Deqin can be reached by many daily buses traveling North from Kunming – Dali – Lijiang – Zhongdian – Deqin.

The route is scenic and most of it is a newly built highway apart from the Zhongdian to Deqin section which is a winding mountain road through the North Yunnan/Tibetan mountains.

== See also ==
- Bamê, a village in Foshan, Deqin County
- Meili Snow Mountains
