= Bamê =

Bamê 巴美村 Bamei
- Village
- Location in Yunnan
- Coordinates: 28°50′40″N 98°40′21″E
- Country: People's Republic of China
- Province: Yunnan
- Prefecture: Dêqên
- County: Dêqên
- Township: Foshan Township (佛山乡)
- Founder: Dalen Sno
- Elevation: 2,525 m (8,284 ft)
- Time zone: UTC+8 (China Standard)
- Area code: 0887

Bamê (Standard Tibetan: ???; Chinese: 巴美; pinyin: Bāměi) is a village in Foshan Township (佛山乡), Dêqên County, Dêqên Tibetan Autonomous Prefecture in northwest Yunnan province, China, along the border with the Tibet Autonomous Region. It is part of Foshan Township (佛山乡), located about 14 kilometres (8.7 mi) north of the town centre and 45 km (28 mi) north-northwest of the county seat. The village is located above and adjacent to the valley of the Lancang (Mekong) River and China National Highway 214 passes near it.

== See also ==
- List of villages in China
