= Adyge-Khablsky District =

Adyge-Khablsky District Адыге-Хабльский район (Russian)
- District

Other transcription(s)
  - Karachay-Balkar: Адыге-Хабль район
  - Kabardian: Адыгэ-Хьэблэ район
  - Abaza: Адыгьа-ХӀабльа район
  - Nogay: Адыге-хабльдын району
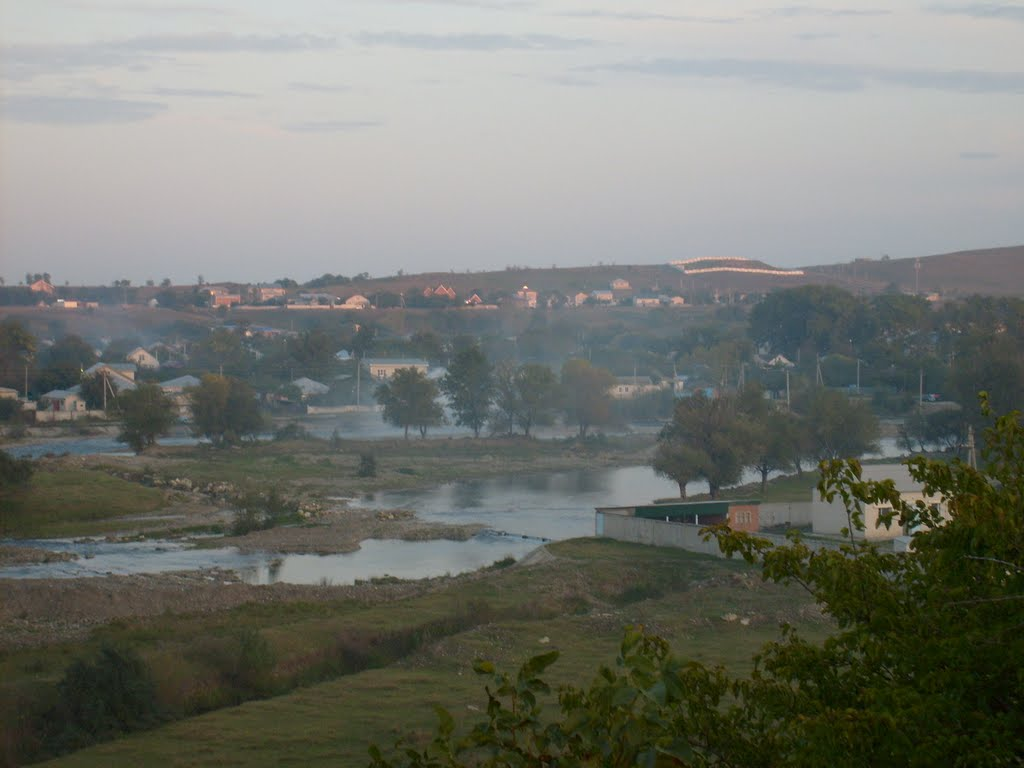
- The aul of Adyge-Khabl, the administrative center of the district
- Location of Adyge-Khablsky District in the Karachay-Cherkess Republic
- Coordinates: 44°20′N 41°56′E
- Country: Russia
- Federal subject: Karachay-Cherkess Republic
- Established: 1965
- Administrative center: Adyge-Khabl

Area
  - Total: 325.9 km^{2} (125.8 sq mi)

Population (2010 Census)
  - Total: 16,186
  - Density: 49.67/km^{2} (128.6/sq mi)
  - Urban: 0%
  - Rural: 100%

Administrative structure
  - Inhabited localities: 15 rural localities

Municipal structure
  - Municipally incorporated as: Adyge-Khablsky Municipal District
  - Municipal divisions: 0 urban settlements, 7 rural settlements
- Time zone: UTC+3 (MSK)
- OKTMO ID: 91603000
- Website: http://a-hmr.ru

Population of Adyge-Khablsky District
- 2010 Census: 16,186
- 2002 Census: 28,426
- 1989 Census: 26,813
- 1979 Census: 25,326

Adyge-Khablsky District (Russian: Ады́ге-Ха́бльский райо́н; Karachay-Balkar: Адыге-Хабль район; Kabardian: Адыгэ-Хьэблэ район; Abaza: Адыгьа-ХӀабльа район; Nogay: Адыге-хабльдын району) is an administrative and municipal district (raion), one of the ten in the Karachay-Cherkess Republic, Russia. It is located in the north of the republic. The area of the district is 325.9 square kilometers (125.8 sq mi). Its administrative center is the rural locality (an aul) of Adyge-Khabl. As of the 2010 Census, the total population of the district was 16,186, with the population of Adyge-Khabl accounting for 24.4% of that number.

== History ==
The district was established in 1957. Nogaysky District was split out of it in 2007.

== Administrative and municipal status ==
Within the framework of administrative divisions, Adyge-Khablsky District is one of the ten in the Karachay-Cherkess Republic and has administrative jurisdiction over all of its fifteen rural localities. As a municipal division, the district is incorporated as Adyge-Khablsky Municipal District. Its fifteen rural localities are incorporated into seven rural settlements within the municipal district. The aul of Adyge-Khabl serves as the administrative center of both the administrative and municipal district.
