= Zhana-Aul =

Zhana-Aul Жана-Аул
- Village
- Location within Altai Republic Location within Russia
- Coordinates: 49°50′N 88°55′E
- Country: Russia
- Region: Altai Republic
- District: Kosh-Agachsky District
- Time zone: UTC+7:00

Zhana-Aul (Russian: Жана-Аул; Altay: Јаҥы-Аул, Ĵañı-Aul; Kazakh: Жаңа ауыл, Jaña auyl) is a rural locality (a selo) and the administrative centre of Kazakhskoye Rural Settlement of Kosh-Agachsky District, the Altai Republic, Russia. The population was 796 as of 2016. There are 16 streets.

== Geography ==
Zhana-Aul is located 27 km southeast of Kosh-Agach (the district's administrative centre) by road. Kokorya is the nearest rural locality.
