= Dongzhulin Monastery =

Buddhist monastery in Yunnan, China

Ganden Döndrubling
- Tibetan transcription(s); Tibetan: དགའ་ལྡན་དོན་འགྲུབ་གླིང། Official transcription (China): 噶丹东竹林寺
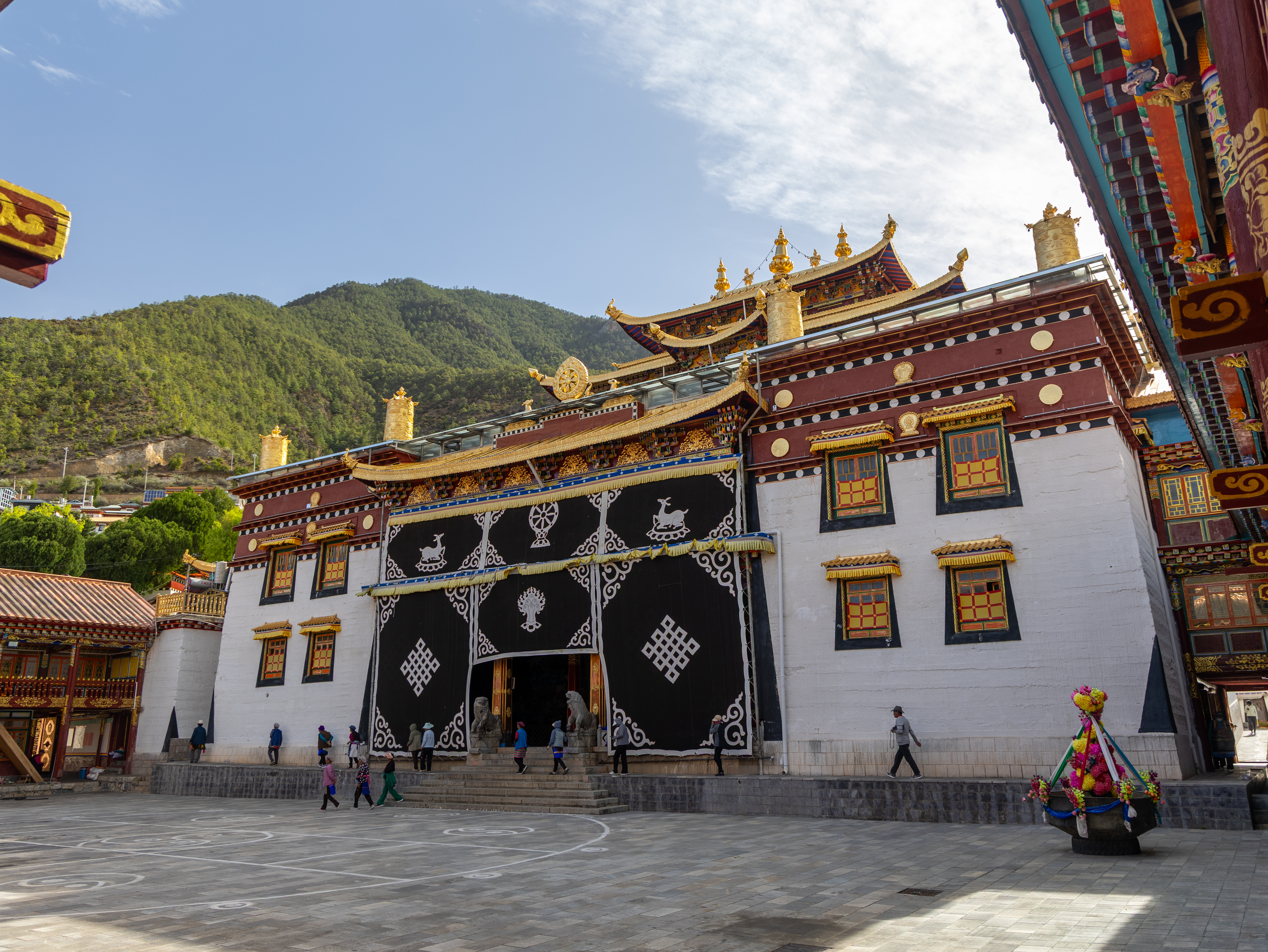

- Location within China

Religion
- Affiliation: Tibetan Buddhism
- Sect: Gelug

Location
- Location: Yunnan, China
- Country: China
- Interactive map of Ganden Döndrubling
- Coordinates: 28°15′54″N 99°13′55″E

Architecture
- Founder: Sonam Rapten
- Established: 1574

Ganden Döndrubling (Tibetan: དགའ་ལྡན་དོན་འགྲུབ་གླིང།, Wylie: dga' ldan don 'grub gling) or Dongzhulin Monastery (Chinese: 噶丹东竹林寺) is a Buddhist monastery in Yunnan, China around 1574. At the time of founding, the monastery followed Kagyu tradition. Around 1670s, the monastery was converted to Gelug tradition.

== History ==
During the rule of the 5th Dalai Lama around 1670s, Khoshut Mongols invaded the area on behalf of 5th Dalai Lama and converted the monastery to Gelug tradition.

In early-1850s, French Catholic priest Charles Renou who eventually became part of the Catholic mission to Tibet disguised as Chinese trader stayed at this monastery for 10 months to learn the Tibetan language.

The monastery was destroyed during the Cultural Revolution, and restored in 1985.

== Gallery ==
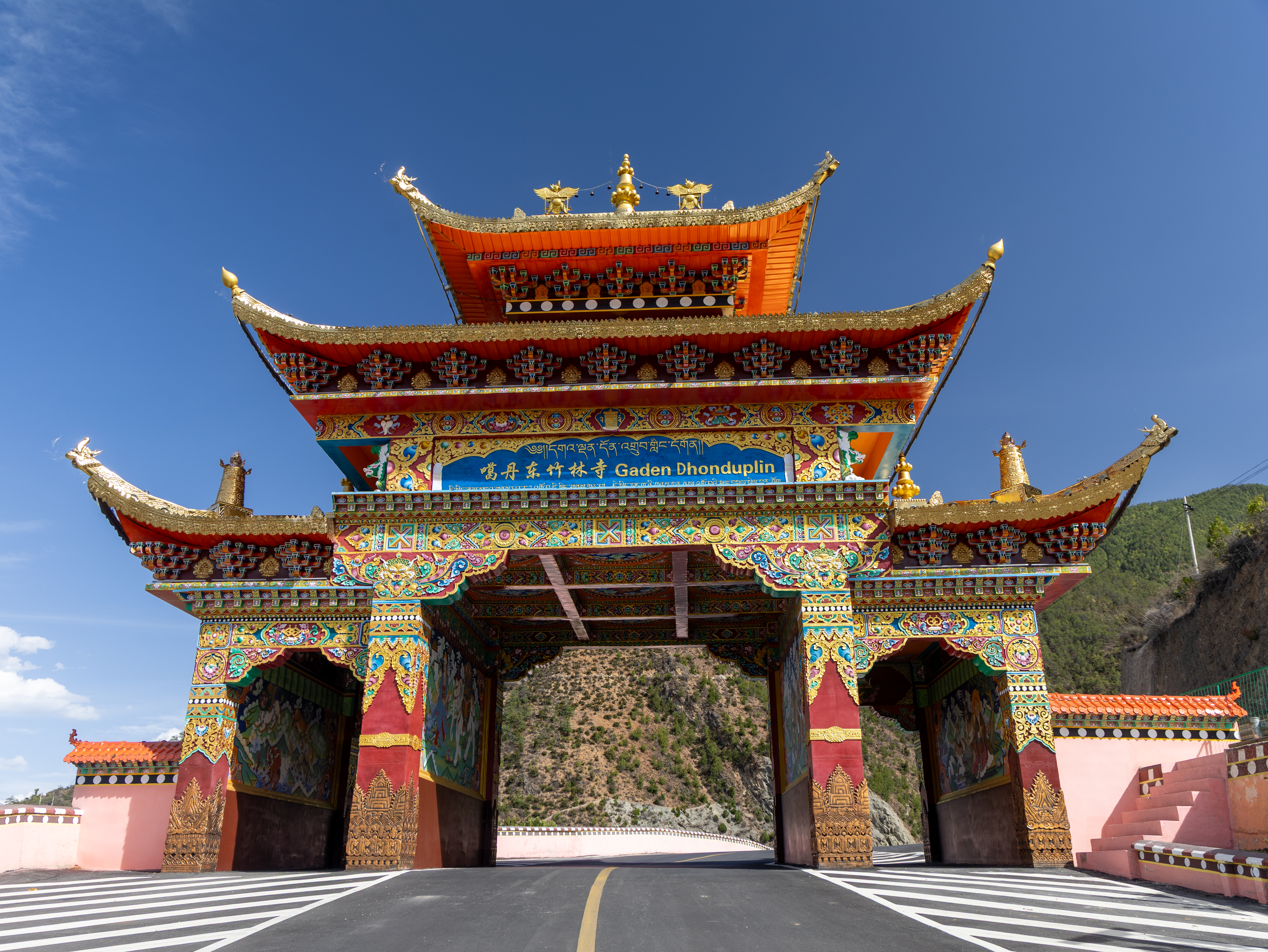
Main Gate

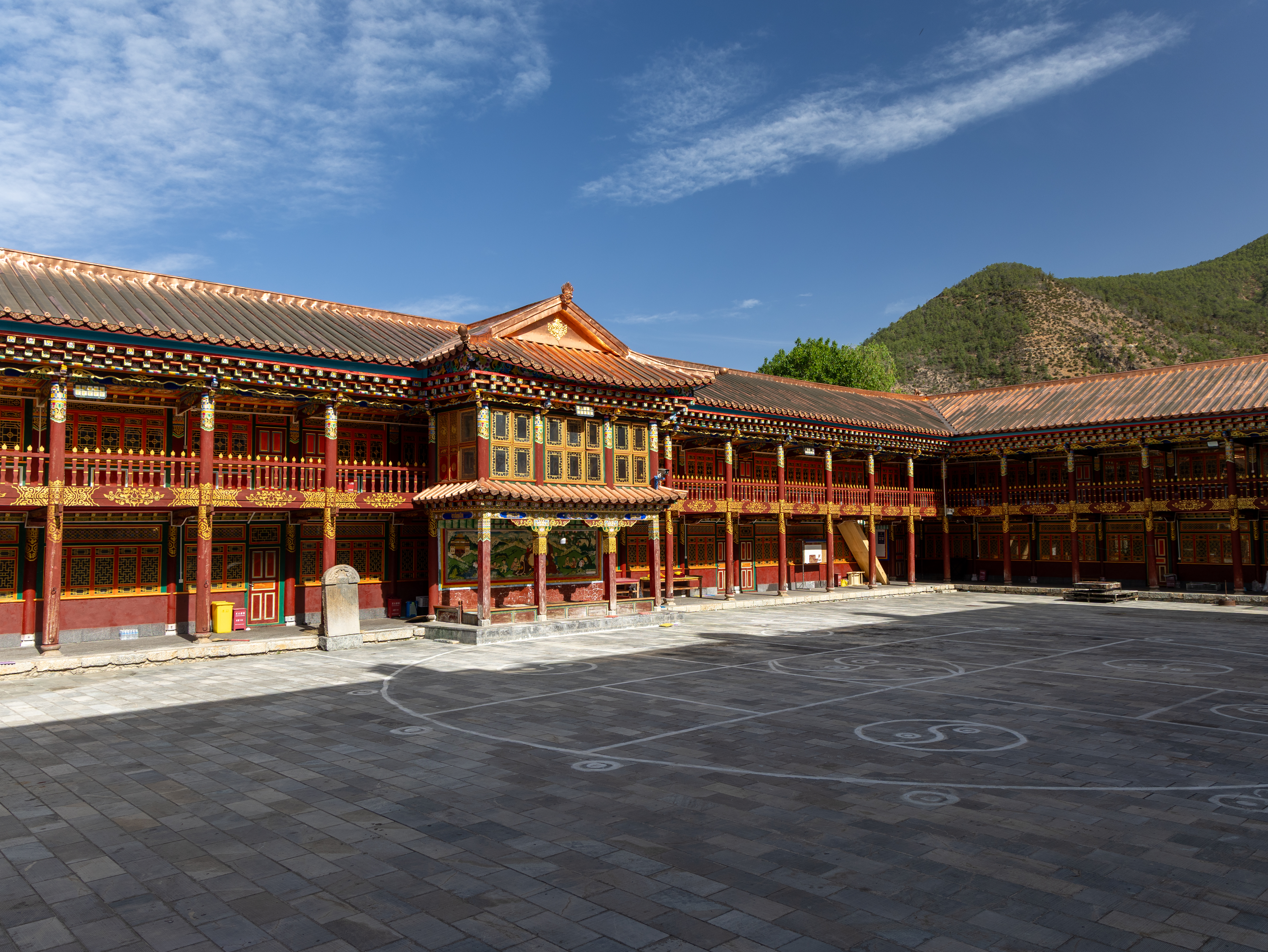
Debating Courtyard

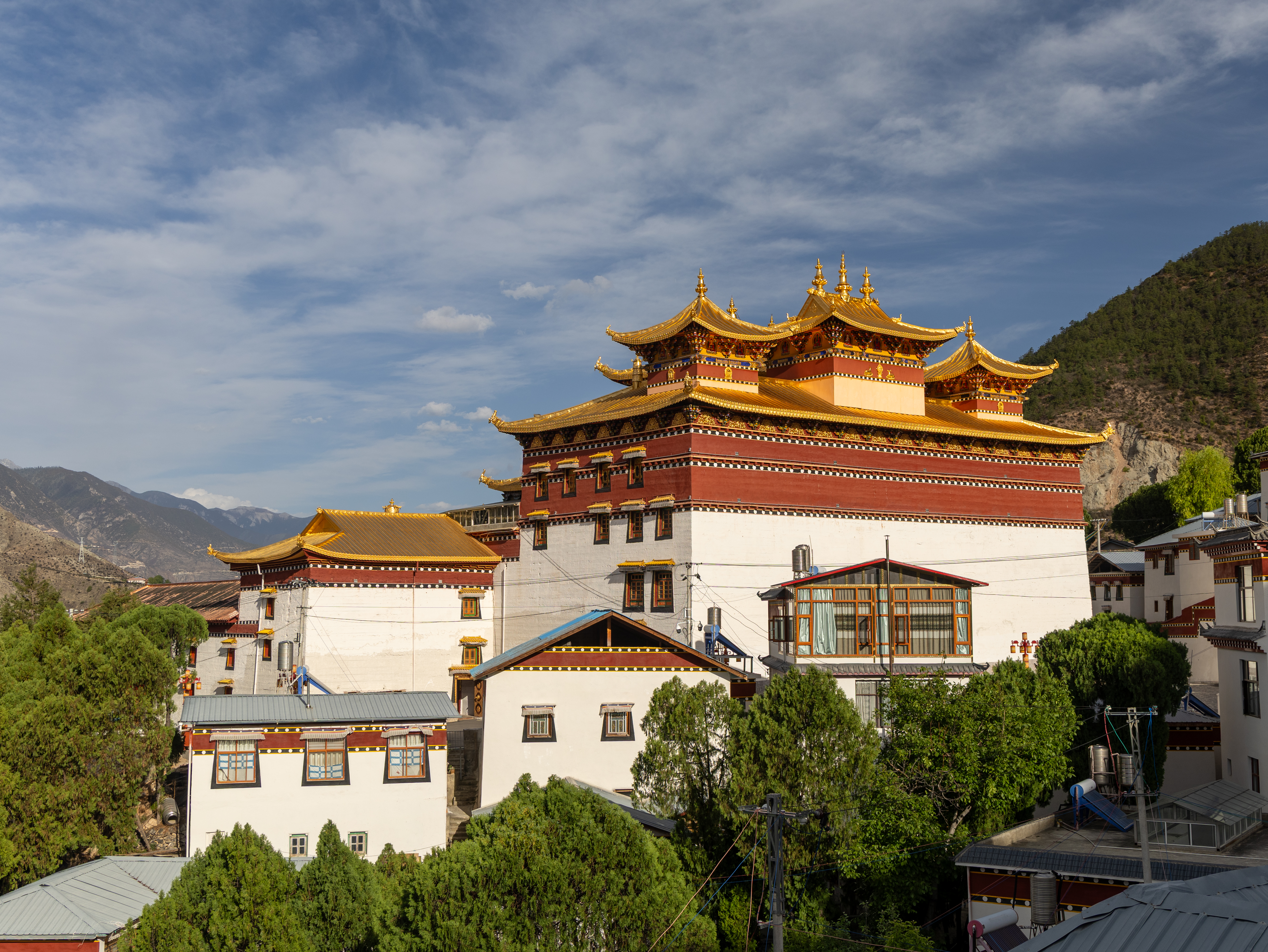
Back of main hall

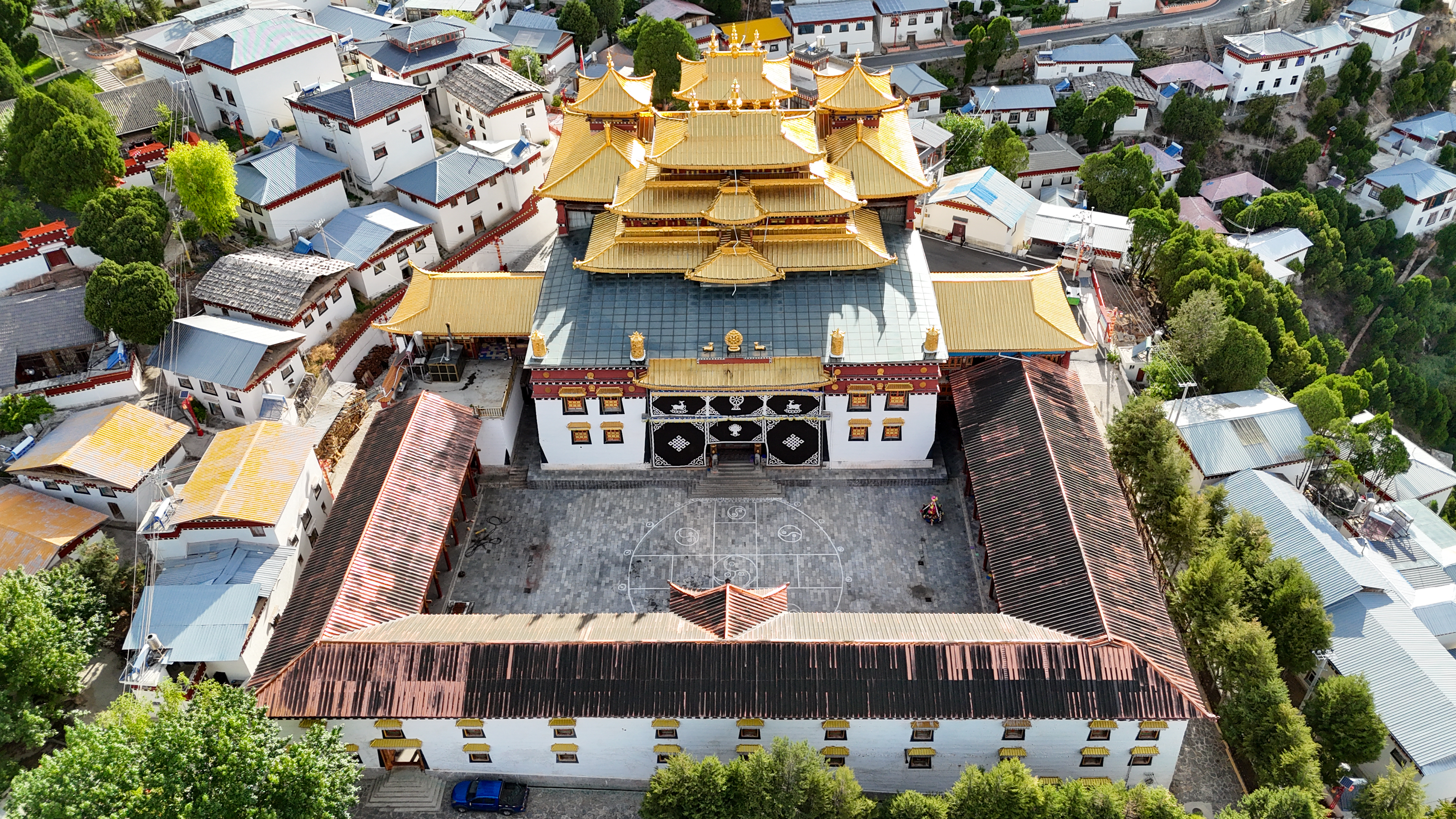
Aerial view

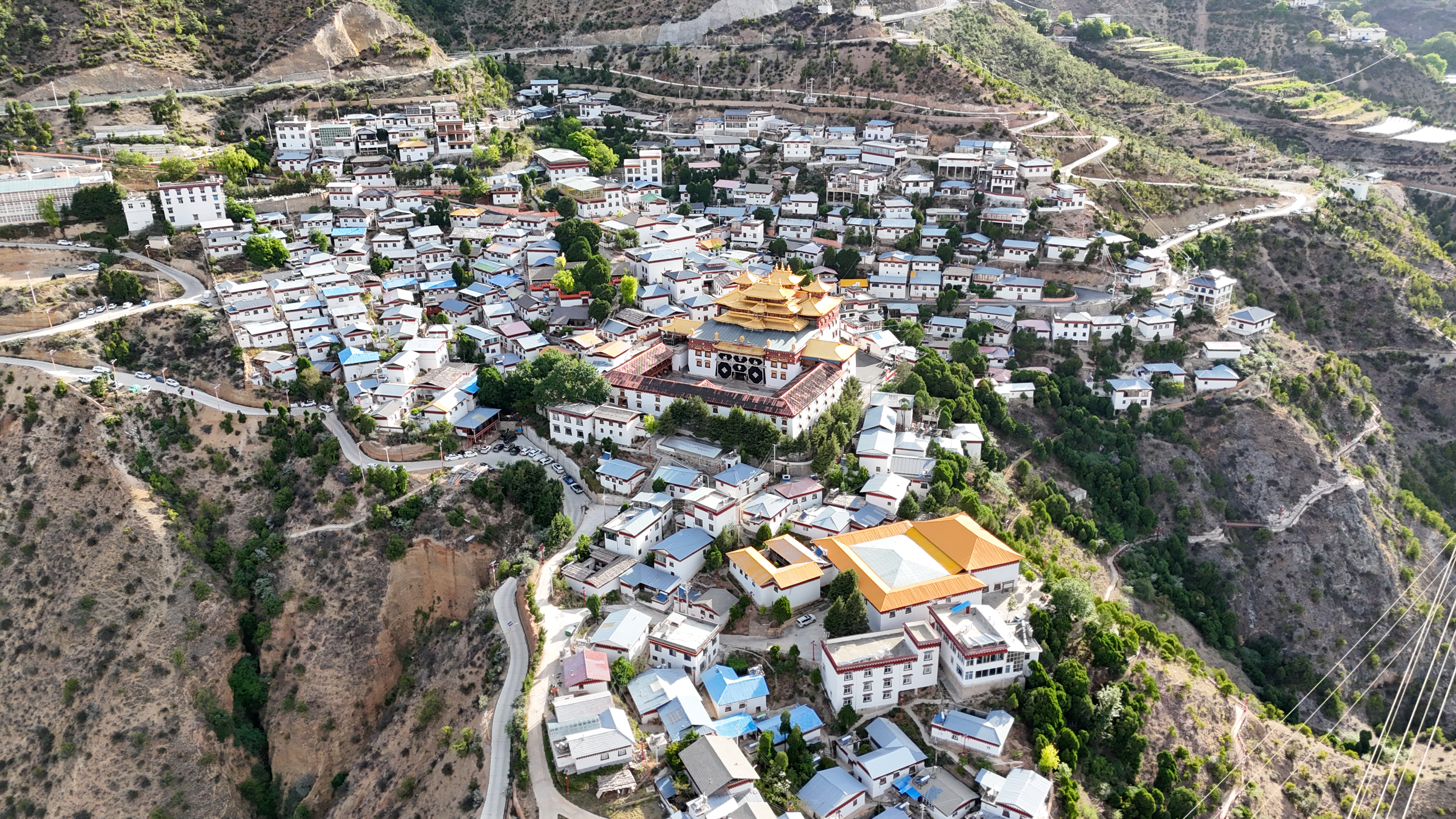
Aerial view

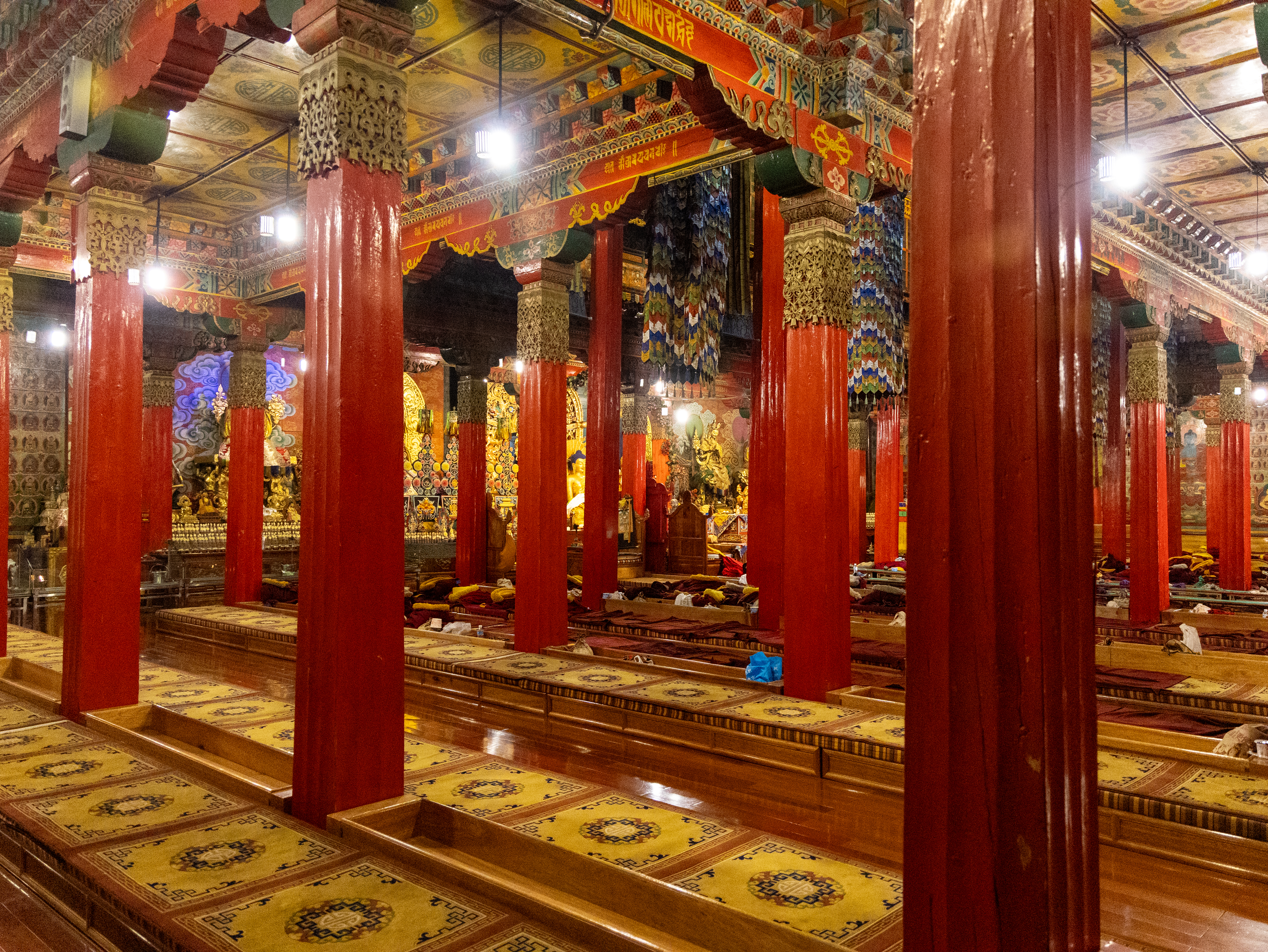
Ground floor of main hall

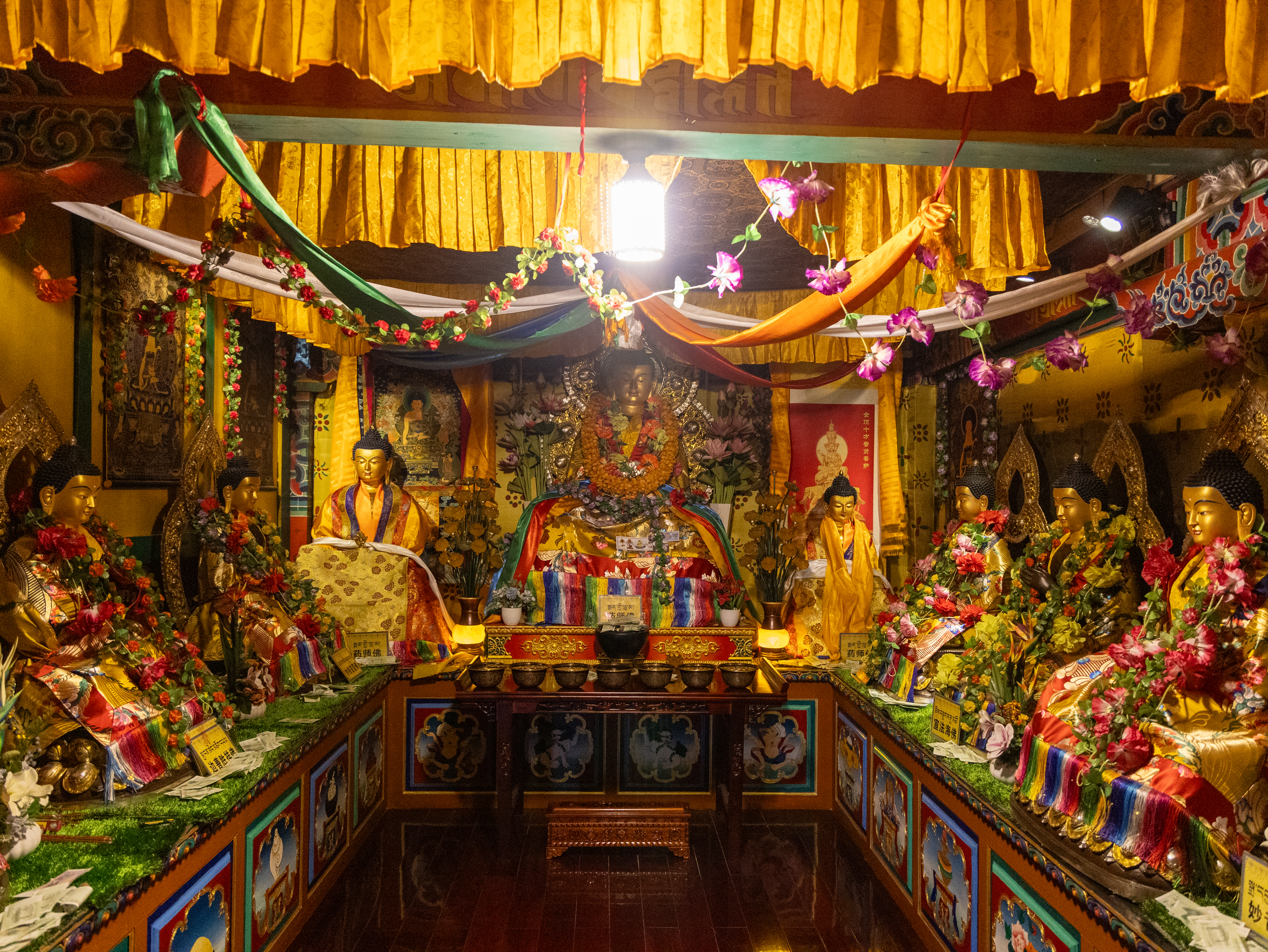
Bhaisajyaguru room in main hall

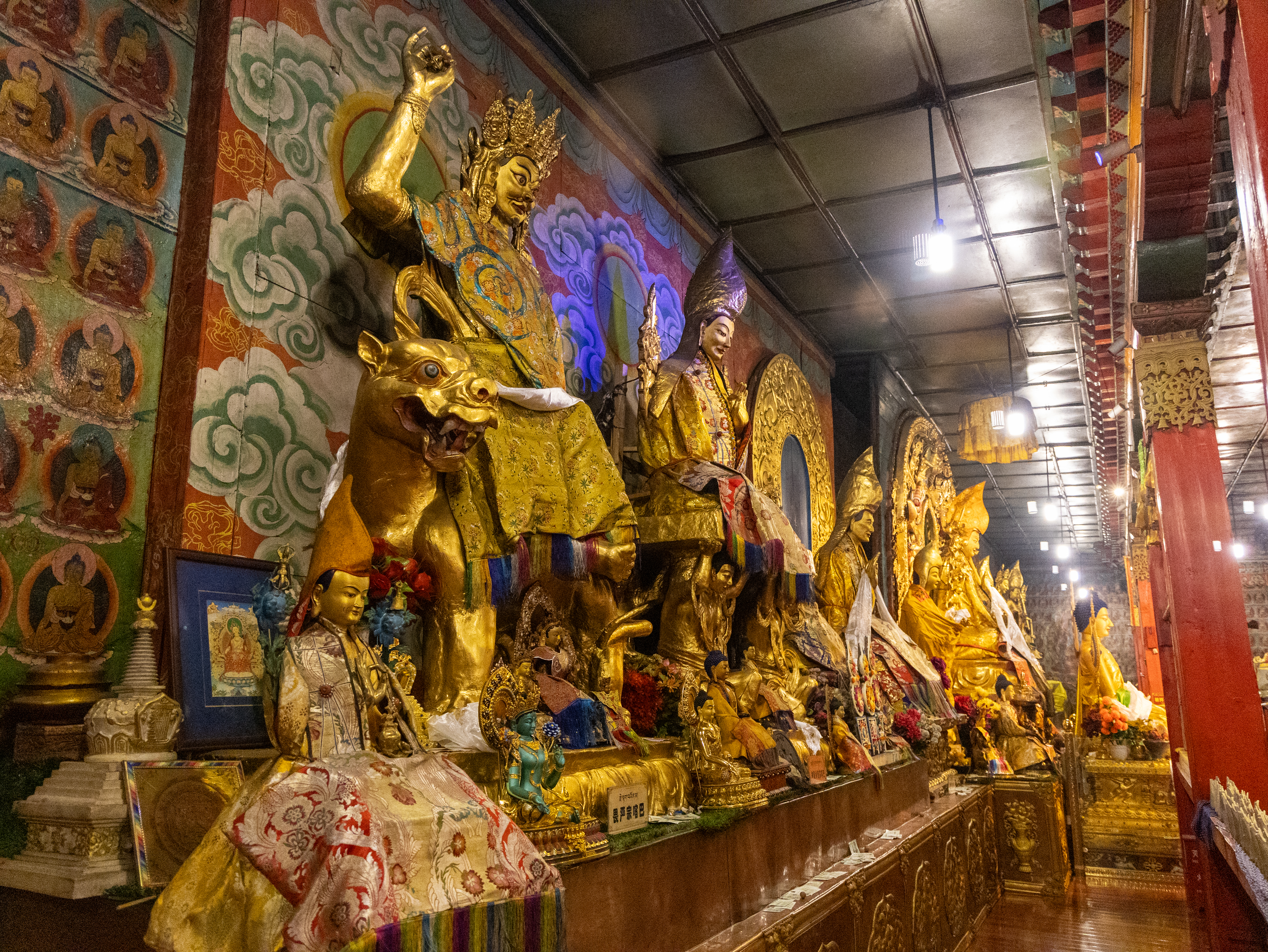
Buddhist statue
