= Stoneking =

Stoneking is a surname. Notable people with the surname include:

- Billy Marshall Stoneking (born 1947), Australian-American poet, playwright, filmmaker, and teacher
- C. W. Stoneking (born 1974), Australian blues singer-songwriter and guitar and banjo player, son of the above
- Dan Stoneking (1942–2007), American sports journalist
- Kristin Stoneking, American Methodist bishop
- Mark Stoneking (born 1956), American geneticist
