= Mitochondrial Eve =

Matrilineal most recent common ancestor of all living humans

Haplogroup L
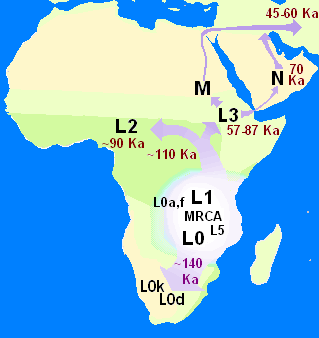
- Possible time of origin: c. 100–230 kya (Note: "the synonymous mutation rate of Kivisild et al. [...] estimates the coalescence time of the mtDNA tree overall at ~160,000 [years ago] [...] We present a revised chronology using the complete mtDNA genome rate and an ML approach for the mtDNA tree in Figure 6, with full details of the age estimates and associated 95% confidence regions in Table S5." See: Supplemental Data.) (Note: "we estimate the time to the most recent common ancestor (TMRCA) of the Y chromosome to be 120 to 156 thousand years and the mitochondrial genome TMRCA to be 99 to 148 thousand years. Our findings suggest that, contrary to previous claims, male lineages do not coalesce significantly more recently than female lineages.")
- Possible place of origin: East Africa
- Ancestor: n/a
- Descendants: Haplogroup L0; Haplogroup L1-6
- Defining mutations: None

In human genetics, the Mitochondrial Eve (more technically known as the Mitochondrial-Most Recent Common Ancestor, shortened to mt-Eve or mt-MRCA) is the matrilineal most recent common ancestor (MRCA) of all living humans. In other words, she is defined as the most recent woman from whom all living humans descend in an unbroken line purely through their mothers and through the mothers of those mothers, back until all lines converge on one woman.

In terms of mitochondrial haplogroups, the mt-MRCA is situated at the divergence of macro-haplogroup L into L0 and L1–7. As of 2013, estimates on the age of this split ranged at around 155,000 years ago, (Note: Two studies published in 2013 had 95% confidence intervals barely overlapping in the neighbourhood of 15 ka, a third study had a 95% confidence interval intermediate between the two others: "99 to 148 ka" according to Poznik, 2013 (ML whole-mtDNA age estimate: 178.8 [155.6; 202.2], ρ whole-mtDNA age estimate: 185.2 [153.8; 216.9], ρ synonymous age estimate: 174.8 [153.8; 216.9]), "134 to 188 ka", according to Fu, 2013, and 150 to 234 ka (95% CI) from Soares, 2009.) consistent with a date later than the speciation of Homo sapiens but earlier than the recent out-of-Africa dispersal.

The male analog to the "Mitochondrial Eve" is the "Y-chromosomal Adam" (or Y-MRCA), the individual from whom all living humans are patrilineally descended. As the identity of both matrilineal and patrilineal MRCAs is dependent on genealogical history (pedigree collapse), they need not have lived at the same time. As of 2015, estimates of the age of the Y-MRCA range around 200,000 to 300,000 years ago, roughly consistent with the emergence of anatomically modern humans.

The name "Mitochondrial Eve" alludes to the biblical Eve, which has led to repeated misrepresentations or misconceptions in journalistic accounts on the topic. Popular science presentations of the topic usually point out such possible misconceptions by emphasizing the fact that the position of mt-MRCA is neither fixed in time (as the position of mt-MRCA moves forward in time as mitochondrial DNA (mtDNA) lineages become extinct), nor does it refer to a "first woman", nor the only living female of her time, nor the first member of a "new species". (Note: "Caution: This does not make Mitochondrial Eve the first woman, or the first human, or the first member of a new species. Further Caution: This does not mean that other women alive when Eve was do not have descendants today; they simply do not have living descendants who are descended only through female links. Yet Further Caution: If a person were to be discovered whose mtDNA showed a pattern of mutations of greater time depth, then the status of Mitochondrial Eve would be reassigned to the most recent female ancestor shared by both that person and the person we now call Mitochondrial Eve.")

== History ==
Hominin timeline
← / Earlier apes; ← / Gorilla split; ← / Chimpanzee split; ← / Earliest bipedal; ← / Earliest sign of Ardipithecus; ← / Earliest sign of Australopithecus; ← / Earliest stone tools; ← / Earliest sign of Homo; ← / Dispersal beyond Africa; ← / Earliest fire / cooking; ← / Earliest rock art; ← / Earliest clothes; ← / Modern humans
(million years ago)

=== Early research ===
Early research using molecular clock methods was done during the late 1970s to early 1980s. Allan Wilson, Mark Stoneking, Rebecca L. Cann and Wesley Brown found that mutation in human mtDNA was unexpectedly fast, at 0.02 substitution per base (1%) in a million years, which is 5–10 times faster than in nuclear DNA. Related work allowed for an analysis of the evolutionary relationships among gorillas, chimpanzees (common chimpanzee and bonobo) and humans. With data from 21 human individuals, Brown published the first estimate on the age of the mt-MRCA at 180,000 years ago in 1980. A statistical analysis published in 1982 was taken as evidence for recent African origin (a hypothesis which at the time was competing with Asian origin of H. sapiens). In their initial work with mtDNA, Cann and Wilson constructed phylogenies using distance matrices, and were unable to find support for a single geographical origin. However the introduction of PAUP (Phylogenetic Analysis Using Parsimony) methods by David Swofford allowed for a more nuanced comparison of DNA sequences. This served as the basis for the data presented in their 1987 paper.

=== 1987 publication ===
By 1985, data from the mtDNA of 145 women of different populations, and of two cell lines, HeLa and GM 3043, derived from an African American and a ǃKung respectively, were available. After more than 40 revisions of the draft, the manuscript was submitted to Nature in late 1985 or early 1986 and published on 1 January 1987. The published conclusion was that all current human mtDNA originated from a single population from Africa, at the time dated to between 140,000 and 200,000 years ago.

The dating for "Eve" was a blow to the multiregional hypothesis, which was debated at the time, and a boost to the theory of the recent origin model.

Cann, Stoneking and Wilson did not use the term "Mitochondrial Eve" or even the name "Eve" in their original paper. It is however used by Cann in an article entitled "In Search of Eve" in the September–October 1987 issue of The Sciences. It appears in the October 1987 article in Science by Roger Lewin, headlined "The Unmasking of Mitochondrial Eve". The biblical connotation was very clear from the start. The accompanying research news in Nature had the title "Out of the garden of Eden".

Wilson himself preferred the term "Lucky Mother" and thought the use of the name Eve "regrettable". But the concept of Eve caught on with the public and was repeated in a Newsweek cover story (11 January 1988 issue featured a depiction of Adam and Eve on the cover, with the title "The Search for Adam and Eve"), and a cover story in Time on 26 January 1987.

=== Reception and later research ===
Shortly after the 1987 publication, its methodology and secondary conclusions were criticised. Both the dating of mt-Eve and the relevance of the age of the purely matrilineal descent for population replacement were subjects of controversy during the 1990s; Alan Templeton (1997) asserted that the study did "not support the hypothesis of a recent African origin for all of humanity following a split between Africans and non-Africans 100,000 years ago" and also did "not support the hypothesis of a recent global replacement of humans coming out of Africa."

The placement by Cann, Stoneking & Wilson (1987) of a relatively small population of humans in sub-Saharan Africa was consistent with the hypothesis of Cann (1982) and lent considerable support for the "recent out-of-Africa" scenario.

In 1999, Krings et al. eliminated problems in molecular clocking postulated by Nei (1992) when it was found that the mtDNA sequence for the same region was substantially different from the MRCA relative to any human sequence.

In 1997, Parsons et al. (1997) published a study of mtDNA mutation rates in a single, well-documented family (the Romanov family of Russian royalty). In this study, they calculated a mutation rate upwards of twenty times higher than previous results.

Although the original research did have analytical limitations, the estimate on the age of the mt-MRCA has proven robust. More recent age estimates have remained consistent with the 140–200 kya estimate published in 1987: A 2013 estimate dated Mitochondrial Eve to about 160 kya (within the reserved estimate of the original research) and Out of Africa II to about 95 kya. Another 2013 study (based on genome sequencing of 69 people from 9 different populations) reported the age of Mitochondrial Eve between 99 and 148 kya and that of the Y-MRCA between 120 and 156 kya.

== Female and mitochondrial ancestry ==
Through random drift or selection the female lineage will trace back to a single female, such as Mitochondrial Eve. In this example over five generations colors represent extinct matrilineal lines and black the matrilineal line descended from mtDNA MRCA.

Without a DNA sample, it is not possible to reconstruct the complete genetic makeup (genome) of any individual who died very long ago. By analysing descendants' DNA, however, parts of ancestral genomes are estimated by scientists. Mitochondrial DNA (mtDNA, the DNA located in mitochondria, different from the DNA in the nucleus of a cell) and Y-chromosome DNA are commonly used to trace ancestry in this manner. mtDNA is generally passed un-mixed from mothers to children of both sexes, along the maternal line, or matrilineally. Matrilineal descent goes back through mothers, to their mothers, until all female lineages converge.

Branches are identified by one or more unique markers which give a mitochondrial "DNA signature" or "haplotype" (e.g. the CRS is a haplotype). Each marker is a DNA base-pair that has resulted from an SNP mutation. Scientists sort mitochondrial DNA results into more or less related groups, with more or less recent common ancestors. This leads to the construction of a DNA family tree where the branches are in biological terms clades, and the common ancestors such as Mitochondrial Eve sit at branching points in this tree. Major branches are said to define a haplogroup (e.g. CRS belongs to haplogroup H), and large branches containing several haplogroups are called "macro-haplogroups".

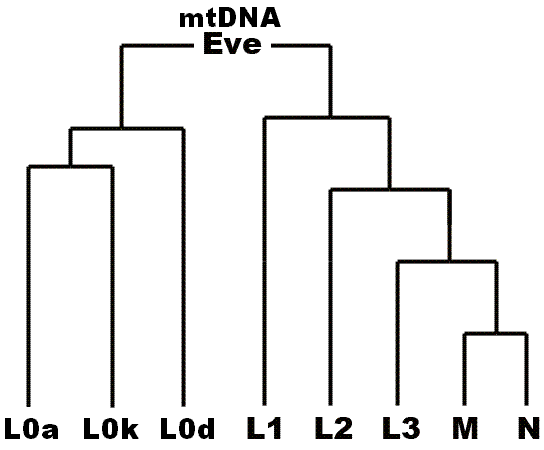
Simplified human mitochondrial phylogeny

The mitochondrial clade which Mitochondrial Eve defines is the species Homo sapiens sapiens itself, or at least the current population or "chronospecies" as it exists today. In principle, earlier Eves can also be defined going beyond the species, for example one who is ancestral to both modern humanity and Neanderthals, or, further back, an "Eve" ancestral to all members of genus Homo and chimpanzees in genus Pan. According to current nomenclature, Mitochondrial Eve's haplogroup was within mitochondrial haplogroup L because this macro-haplogroup contains all surviving human mitochondrial lineages today, and she must predate the emergence of L0.

The mitochondrial haplotype L has historically been characterized as having a 7-haplotype structure which includes haplogroups L0-L6. However, a 2022 publication provides support for a new 8-haplotype structure due to the addition of the L7 lineage L7 had previously been misclassified as belonging to the L5 haplogroup, but reassessment of the data shows them to instead be sister taxa.

The variation of mitochondrial DNA between different people can be used to estimate the time back to a common ancestor, such as Mitochondrial Eve. This works because, along any particular line of descent, mitochondrial DNA accumulates mutations at the rate of approximately one every 3,500 years. (Note: There are sites in mtDNA (such as: 16129, 16223, 16311, 16362) that evolve more rapidly, have been noted to change within intragenerational timeframes.) A certain number of these new variants will survive into modern times and be identifiable as distinct lineages. At the same time some branches, including even very old ones, come to an end when the last family in a distinct branch has no daughters.

Mitochondrial Eve is the most recent common matrilineal ancestor for all modern humans. Whenever one of the two most ancient branch lines dies out (by producing only non-matrilinear descendants at that time), the MRCA will move to a more recent female ancestor, always the most recent mother to have more than one daughter with living maternal line descendants alive today. The number of mutations that can be found distinguishing modern people is determined by two criteria: first and most obviously, the time back to her, but second and less obviously by the varying rates at which new branches have come into existence and old branches have become extinct. By looking at the number of mutations which have been accumulated in different branches of this family tree, and looking at which geographical regions have the widest range of least related branches, the region where Eve lived can be proposed.

== Popular reception and misconceptions ==
Newsweek reported on Mitochondrial Eve based on the Cann et al. study in January 1988, under a heading of "Scientists Explore a Controversial Theory About Man's Origins". The edition sold a record number of copies.

The popular name "mitochondrial Eve", of 1980s coinage, has contributed to a number of popular misconceptions. At first, the announcement of a "mitochondrial Eve" was even greeted with endorsement from young Earth creationists, who viewed the theory as a validation of the biblical creation story.

Due to such misunderstandings, authors of popular science publications since the 1990s have been emphatic in pointing out that the name is merely a popular convention, and that the mt-MRCA was not in any way the "first woman". Her position is purely the result of genealogical history of human populations later, and as matrilineal lineages die out, the position of mt-MRCA keeps moving forward to younger individuals over time.

In River Out of Eden (1995), Richard Dawkins discussed human ancestry in the context of a "river of genes", including an explanation of the concept of Mitochondrial Eve. The Seven Daughters of Eve (2002) presented the topic of human mitochondrial genetics to a general audience. The Real Eve: Modern Man's Journey Out of Africa by Stephen Oppenheimer (2003) was adapted into a 2002 Discovery Channel documentary.

=== Not the only woman ===
One common misconception surrounding Mitochondrial Eve is that since all women alive today descended in a direct unbroken female line from her, she must have been the only woman alive at the time. However, nuclear DNA studies indicate that the effective population size of ancient humans never dropped below tens of thousands. Other women living during Eve's time may have descendants alive today but not in a direct female line.

=== Not a fixed individual over time ===
After the lineage in black fails to follow on, the new Mitochondrial Eve will go to the next woman who had, at least, two daughters.

The definition of Mitochondrial Eve is fixed, but the woman in prehistory who fits this definition can change. That is, not only can our knowledge of when and where Mitochondrial Eve lived change due to new discoveries, but the actual Mitochondrial Eve can change. The Mitochondrial Eve can change, when a mother-daughter line comes to an end. It follows from the definition of Mitochondrial Eve that she had at least two daughters who both have unbroken female lineages that have survived to the present day. In every generation mitochondrial lineages end – when a woman with unique mtDNA dies with no daughters. When the mitochondrial lineages of daughters of Mitochondrial Eve die out, then the title of "Mitochondrial Eve" shifts forward from the remaining daughter through her matrilineal descendants, until the first descendant is reached who had two or more daughters who together have all living humans as their matrilineal descendants. Once a lineage has died out it is irretrievably lost and this mechanism can thus only shift the title of "Mitochondrial Eve" forward in time.

Because mtDNA mapping of humans is very incomplete, the discovery of living mtDNA lines which predate our current concept of "Mitochondrial Eve" could result in the title moving to an earlier woman. This happened to her male counterpart, "Y-chromosomal Adam", when an older Y line, haplogroup A-00, was discovered.

=== Not necessarily a contemporary of "Y-chromosomal Adam" ===
Sometimes Mitochondrial Eve is assumed to have lived at the same time as Y-chromosomal Adam (from whom all living males are descended patrilineally), and perhaps even met and mated with him. Even if this were true, which is currently regarded as highly unlikely, this would only be a coincidence. Like Mitochondrial "Eve", Y-chromosomal "Adam" probably lived in Africa. A recent study (March 2013) concluded however that "Eve" lived much later than "Adam" – some 140,000 years later. (Earlier studies considered, conversely, that "Eve" lived earlier than "Adam".) More recent studies indicate that it is not impossible that Mitochondrial Eve and Y-chromosomal Adam might have lived around the same time.

=== Not the most recent ancestor shared by all humans ===
Mitochondrial Eve is the most recent common matrilineal ancestor, not the most recent common ancestor. Since the mtDNA is inherited maternally and recombination is either rare or absent, it is relatively easy to track the ancestry of the lineages back to a MRCA; however, this MRCA is valid only when discussing mitochondrial DNA. An approximate sequence from newest to oldest can list various important points in the ancestry of modern human populations:

- The human MRCA. The time period that human MRCA lived in is unknown. Rohde et al put forth a "rough guess" that the MRCA could have existed 5000 years ago; however, the authors state that this estimate is "extremely tentative, and the model contains several obvious sources of error, as it was motivated more by considerations of theoretical insight and tractability than by realism." Just a few thousand years before the most recent single ancestor shared by all living humans was the time at which all humans who were then alive either left no descendants alive today or were common ancestors of all humans alive today. However, such a late date is difficult to reconcile with the geographical spread of our species and the consequent isolation of different groups from each other. For example, it is generally accepted that the indigenous population of Tasmania was isolated from all other humans between the rise in sea level after the last ice age some 8000 years ago and the arrival of Europeans. Estimates of the MRCA of even closely related human populations have been much more than 5000 years ago.
- The identical ancestors point. In other words, "each present-day human has exactly the same set of genealogical ancestors" alive at the "identical ancestors point" in time. This is far more recent than when Mitochondrial Eve was proposed to have lived.
- Mitochondrial Eve, the most recent female-line common ancestor of all living people.
- "Y-chromosomal Adam", the most recent male-line common ancestor of all living people.

== See also ==
- Archaeogenetics
- Coalescent theory
- Eurasian Adam
- Genealogical DNA test
- Genetic genealogy
- Haplogroup L0
- Human evolution
- Human mitochondrial DNA haplogroups
- Last universal ancestor
- Macro-haplogroup L (mtDNA)
- Mitochondrial genome
- Monogenism
- Neutral theory of molecular evolution
- Prehistoric demography
- Single origin hypothesis
- Timeline of evolution
- Timeline of human evolution
- Y-chromosomal Aaron
- Y-chromosomal Adam
- Women in prehistory

Phylogenetic tree of human mitochondrial DNA (mtDNA) haplogroups

Mitochondrial Eve (L)

L0
L1–6

L1
L2

L3

L4
L5
L6
M
N

CZ
D
E
G
Q

O
A
S
R

I
W
X
Y
C
Z
B
F
R0

pre-JT

P

U
HV
JT
K
H
V
J
T
