= Kistler Prize =

Awarded by the Foundation For the Future

- Description: Recognizing contributions to understanding the link between human heredity and society
- Country: United States
- Presented by: Foundation For the Future
- Rewards: $100,000 and a 200g gold medallion

The Kistler Prize (1999-2011) was awarded annually to recognize original contributions "to the understanding of the connection between human heredity and human society", and was named after its benefactor, physicist and inventor Walter Kistler. The prize was awarded by the Foundation For the Future and it included a cash award of US $100,000 and a 200-gram gold medallion.

== Recipients ==
The recipients have been:

- 2000 – Edward O. Wilson
- 2001 – Richard Dawkins
- 2002 – Luigi Luca Cavalli-Sforza
- 2003 – Arthur Jensen
- 2004 – Vincent Sarich
- 2005 – Thomas J. Bouchard
- 2006 – Doreen Kimura
- 2007 – Spencer Wells
- 2008 – Craig Venter
- 2009 – Svante Pääbo
- 2010 – Leroy Hood
- 2011 – Charles Murray

== Walter P. Kistler Book Award ==
The Walter P. Kistler Book Award was established in 2003 to recognize authors of science books that "significantly increase the knowledge and understanding of the public regarding subjects that will shape the future of our species". The award includes a cash prize of US$10,000 and is formally presented in ceremonies that are open to the public.

The recipients have been:

- 2003 – Gregory Stock for Redesigning Humans: Our Inevitable Genetic Future
- 2004 – Spencer Wells for The Journey of Man: A Genetic Odyssey
- 2005 – Steven Pinker for The Blank Slate
- 2006 – William H. Calvin for A Brain for All Seasons: Human Evolution and Abrupt Climate Change
- 2007 – Eric Chaisson for Epic of Evolution: Seven Ages of the Cosmos
- 2008 – Christopher Stringer for Homo britannicus: The Incredible Story of Human Life in Britain
- 2009 – David Archer (scientist) for The Long Thaw: How Humans are Changing the Next 100,000 Years of Earth's Climate
- 2011 – Laurence C. Smith for The World in 2050: Four Forces Shaping Civilization's Northern Future

== Foundation For the Future ==
The mission of the Foundation For the Future is to increase and diffuse knowledge concerning the long-term future of humanity. It conducts a broad range of programs and activities to promote an understanding of the factors that may affect human life in the long term.

== See also ==
- List of biology awards
