= Robert C. Gunderson =

American genealogist (1931–2003)

Robert C. Gunderson (6 December 1931 – 23 June 2003) was an American genealogist. He was the first supervisor of the Royalty Identification Unit of the Genealogical Society of Utah and introduced the term Pedigree Collapse.

== Career ==
Robert Gunderson began his work with the Genealogical Society of Utah in 1964. He started the Royalty Identification Unit in 1972 and served as Senior Royalty Research Specialist. Among other projects, he and his assistants attempted to identify all the descendants of Edward IV of England. In 1980, Gunderson first propounded the concept of Pedigree Collapse at the World Conference on Records in Salt Lake City, Utah. In his address, Connecting Your Pedigree into Royal, Noble and Medieval Families, he described how reproduction between two individuals who share a common ancestor causes the number of distinct ancestors in the family tree of their offspring to be smaller than it would otherwise be.

== Other sources ==
- Shoumatoff, Alex (1985). The Mountain of Names: A History of the Human Family. New York: Simon and Schuster. pp. 318. ISBN 0-671-49440-6.
