= Identical ancestors point =

Concept in genetic genealogy

In genetic genealogy, the identical ancestors point (IAP), also known as the all common ancestors (ACA) point, or genetic isopoint, is the most recent point in a given population's past such that each individual alive at that point either has no living descendants, or is the ancestor of every individual alive in the present. This point lies further in the past than the population's most recent common ancestor (MRCA).

== Calculation ==
A set of full siblings has an IAP one generation back: their parents. Similarly, double first cousins have an IAP two generations back: the four grandparents.

Considering all humans alive today and tracing their IAPs, one will eventually arrive at the MRCA to all humans. The MRCA had many contemporary companions. Many of these contemporaries had descendant lines to some people living today, but not to all people living today. Others did not have any children, or had descendants, but all descendant lines are now fully extinct.

Going further back, all the ancestors of the MRCA are also common ancestors to all humans, just not the most recent one. As we move further back in time, other common ancestors will be found on other lines, resulting in more and more of the ancient population being common ancestors. Eventually the point is reached where all people in the past population fall into one of two categories: they are common ancestors, with at least one line of descent to everyone living today, or they are the ancestors of no one alive today, because their lines of descent are completely extinct on every branch. This point in time is termed the 'identical ancestors point'.

Joseph T. Chang has proposed that in a large, well mixed population of size N, we only have to go 1.77log_{2} (N) generations in the past to find the time when everyone in the population (who left descendants) is an ancestor to the entire population. For example, a population of 4,000 individuals would, on average, have a most recent common ancestor about 13 generations earlier and an IAP about 24 or 25 generations earlier. (This model assumes random mate choice, which is unrealistic for the human population, where geographic obstacles have greatly reduced mixing across the entire population.)

== Of Homo sapiens ==
The identical ancestors point for Homo sapiens has been the subject of debate. In 2003 Rohde estimated it to be between 5000 and 15,000 years ago. In 2004, Rohde, Olson and Chang showed through simulations that, given the false assumption of random mate choice without geographic barriers, the identical ancestors point for all humans would be surprisingly recent, on the order of 2,000–5,000 years ago. Ralph and Coop (2013), considering the European population and working from genetics, came to similar conclusions for the recent common ancestry of Europeans. More recently, however, researchers have estimated the European isopoint to be closer to 1000 A.D.

All living people share exactly the same set of ancestors before the identical ancestors point, all the way to the very first single-celled organism. However, people will vary widely in how much ancestry and genes they inherit from each ancestor, which will cause them to have very different genotypes and phenotypes.

This is illustrated in the 2003 simulation as follows: considering the ancestral populations alive at 5000 BC, close to the ACA point, a modern-day Japanese person will get 88.4% of their ancestry from Japan, and most of the remainder from China or Korea, with only 0.00049% traced to Norway; conversely, a modern-day Norwegian will get over 92% of their ancestry from Norway (or over 96% from Scandinavia) and only 0.00044% from Japan.

Thus, even though the Norwegian and Japanese person share the same set of ancestors, these ancestors appear in their family tree in dramatically different proportions. A Japanese person in 5000 BC with present-day descendants will likely appear trillions of times in a modern-day Japanese person's family tree, but might appear only one time in a Norwegian person's family tree. A 5000 BC Norwegian person will similarly appear far more times in a typical Norwegian person's family tree than they will appear in a Japanese person's family tree.

Note that a person in the population today does not necessarily inherit any genetic material from a given ancestor at the identical ancestors point. For example, a Japanese person may not inherit any genetic material from his Norwegian ancestors. In that case, they are genealogical ancestors but not genetic ancestors. The same goes even for the most recent common ancestor.

== See also ==
- Coefficient of relationship
- Genealogical DNA test
- Genealogy
- Genetic distance
- Genetic genealogy
- Last universal ancestor
- Most recent common ancestor
- Pedigree collapse
- Phylogenetic tree
- Recent African origin
- The Ancestor's Tale
