= All Saints Episcopal School (Lubbock, Texas) =

Coordinates: 33.5013°N 101.8844°W

All Saints Episcopal School is an independent, private school in Lubbock, Texas. With approximately 450 students, the school has children from age three through high school.

In 2019, the School broke ground for a middle school expansion.

In 2021, the School received an anonymous gift of $1.25 million to fund a chaplaincy.

The School opened a new tennis facility that it is renting out for tournaments.

== Notable alumni ==
- Madisyn Cox
- Sean O'Hair
- Spencer Wells
- Sawyer Robertson
