= Spencer Wells =

American author and geneticist

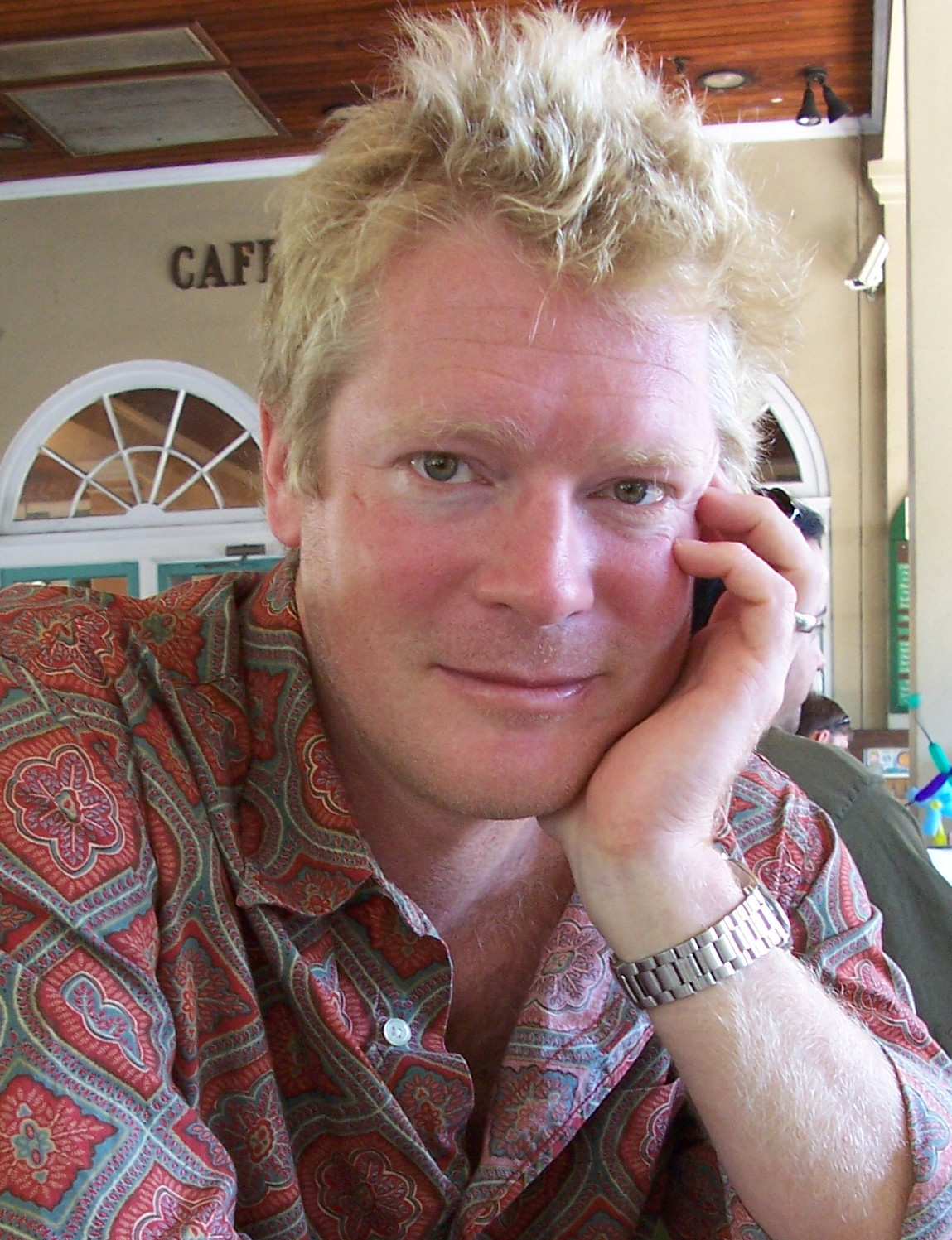
- Spencer Wells
- Born: Rush Spencer Wells IV; April 6, 1969 (age 57); Marietta, Georgia, US
- Education: University of Texas at Austin; Harvard University
- Awards: Kistler Prize (2007)
- Scientific career
- Fields: Genetics (biologist)

Rush Spencer Wells (born April 6, 1969) is an American geneticist, anthropologist, author and entrepreneur. He co-hosts The Insight podcast with Razib Khan. Wells led The Genographic Project from 2005 to 2015, as an Explorer-in-Residence at the National Geographic Society.

== Biography ==
=== Youth and education ===
Wells was born in Marietta, Georgia and grew up in Lubbock, Texas. He attended both All Saints School and Lubbock High School, and received a National Merit Scholarship. He obtained a Bachelor of Science in biology from the University of Texas at Austin in 1988 and a Ph.D. in biology from Harvard University in 1994. He was a postdoctoral fellow at Stanford University between 1994 and 1998, and a research fellow at the University of Oxford from 1999 to 2000.

=== Career ===
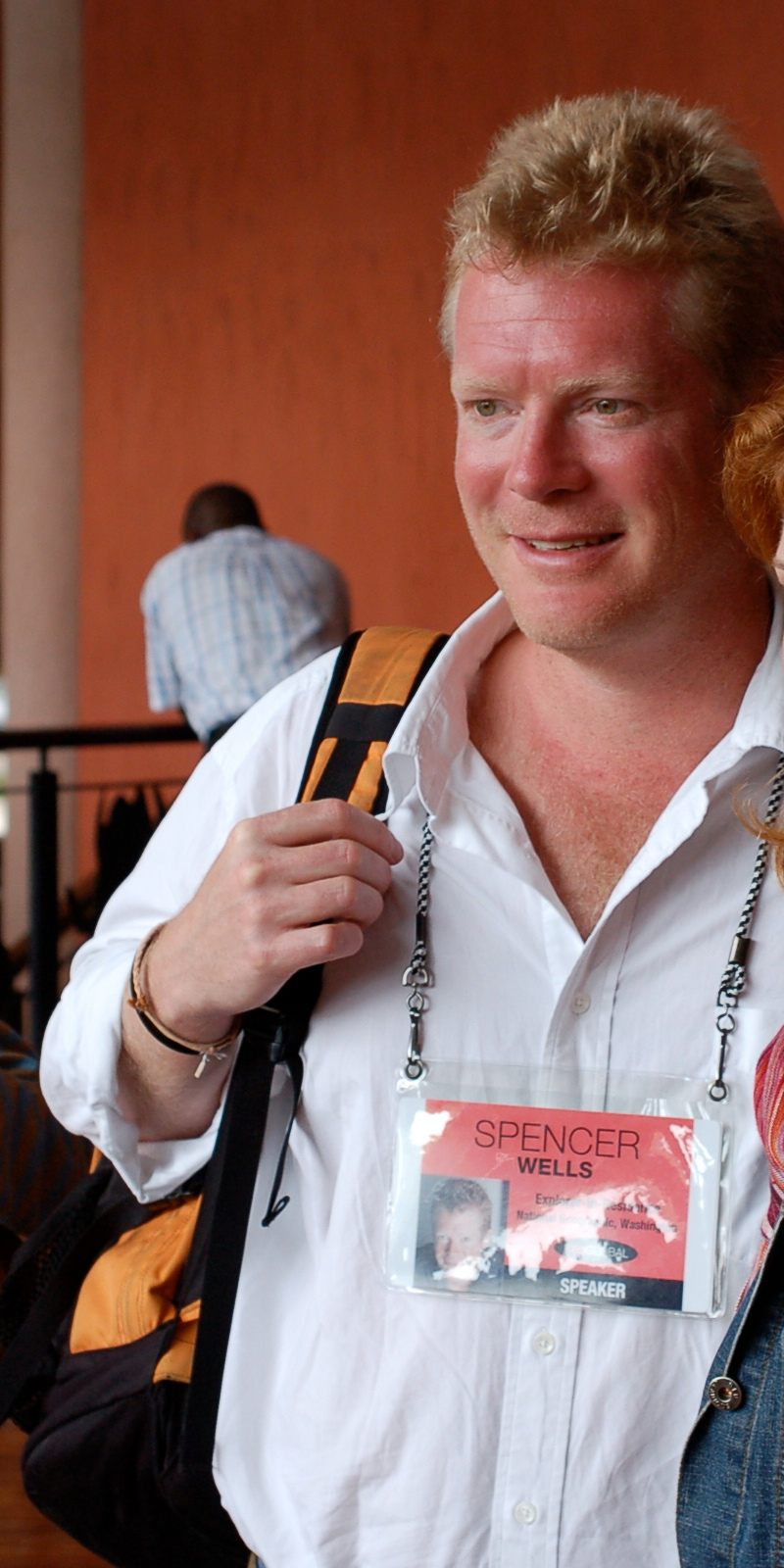
Spencer Wells at the TED Global conference in Arusha, Tanzania in 2007

Wells did his Ph.D. work under Richard Lewontin, and later did postdoctoral research with Luigi Luca Cavalli-Sforza and Sir Walter Bodmer. His work, which has helped to establish the critical role played by Central Asia in the peopling of the world, has been published in journals such as Science, American Journal of Human Genetics, and the Proceedings of the National Academy of Sciences.

Wells is renowned for his logistically complex sample-collecting expeditions in remote parts of the world. EurAsia98, which in 1998 took him and his team from London to the Altai Mountains on the Mongolian border, via an overland route through the Caucasus, Iran and the -stans of Central Asia, was sponsored by Land Rover. In 2005 he led a team of Genographic scientists on the first modern expedition to the Tibesti Mountains in northern Chad, and in 2006 he led a team to the Wakhan Corridor on the Tajik-Afghan border. His work has taken him to more than 100 countries.

He wrote the book The Journey of Man: A Genetic Odyssey (2002), which explains how genetic data has been used to trace human migrations over the past 50,000 years, when modern humans first migrated outside of Africa. According to Wells, one group took a southern route and populated southern India and southeast Asia, then Australia. The other group, accounting for 90% of the world's non-African population (some 5.4 billion people as of 2014), took a northern route, eventually peopling most of Eurasia (largely displacing the aboriginals in southern India, Sri Lanka and Southeast Asia in the process), North Africa and the Americas. Wells also wrote and presented the 2003 PBS/National Geographic documentary of the same name. Wells has contributed to efforts to determine the date of Y-chromosomal Adam.

From 2005-2015, Wells led the Genographic Project, undertaken by the National Geographic Society, IBM, and the Waitt Foundation, which aimed to create a picture of how our ancestors populated the planet by analyzing DNA samples from around the world. The project is credited with creating the personal genomics industry.

He has presented the results of his work around the world, including at the 2007 TED conference, where he spoke specifically about human diversity. Wells was a keynote speaker at the Science & Technology Summit in The Hague on November 18, 2010. He also gave the keynote address at the University of Texas College of Natural Sciences commencement exercises on May 21, 2011.

Wells was one of the keynote speakers at the Southern California Genealogical Society Jamboree that was co-sponsored by the International Society of Genetic Genealogy on June 3, 2013. The focus was on Family History and DNA: Genetic Genealogy in 2013, where he was quoted as saying:

Since 2005, the Genographic Project has used the latest genetic technology to expand our knowledge of the human story, and its pioneering use of DNA testing to engage and involve the public in the research effort has helped to create a new breed of "citizen scientist." Geno 2.0 expands the scope for citizen science, harnessing the power of the crowd to discover new details of human population history.

== Allegations of anti-Semitism ==
In July 2020, Wells attracted criticism for tweeting that Israel should be bombed “until the sand turns to glass”. from the online edition of Algemeiner Journal.

The University of Texas at Austin subsequently distanced itself from Wells, stating, "Spencer Wells is no longer a faculty or advisory council member at UT. He previously had a courtesy, unpaid appointment as a part-time adjunct that did not involve teaching. That ended in May and was not renewed. We do not have any association with the views held by Mr. Wells."

== Personal life ==
Wells is married to Holly Morse, and the two have lived in Lombok, Indonesia since 2020. He was previously married to Trendell Thompson (1998-2005), with whom he has two children, Sasha Thompson-Wells and Margot Thompson-Wells; and Pamela Caragol Wells (2005-2015).

== Awards and honors ==
- National Merit Scholar
- Phi Beta Kappa
- Fellow of the Explorers Club
- National Geographic Explorer-in-Residence
- Kistler Prize
- Outstanding Young Texas Ex
- Frank H.T. Rhodes Class of '56 Professorship, Cornell University
- Director of the Texas Lyceum
- Distinguished Alumnus, College of Natural Sciences, University of Texas at Austin

== Books ==
- The Journey of Man: A Genetic Odyssey, 2002 (Penguin, UK; Princeton University Press and Random House, US; Fischer Verlag, Germany; Longanesi, Italy; Oceano, Spain/Latin America; Ucila International, Slovenia; Dokoran, Czech Republic; Akkord, Hungary; Oriental Press, China; Basilico, Japan; ScienceBooks, Korea; Yurt, Turkey; CD Press, Romania; Alpina, Russia)
- Deep Ancestry: Inside the Genographic Project, 2006 (National Geographic)
- Pandora's Seed: The Unforeseen Cost of Civilization, 2010 (Random House, US; Penguin, UK; Contact, Netherlands; Codice, Italy; Eksmo, Russia; Nika Center, Ukraine; Commonwealth, Taiwan; Eulyoo, Korea; Kagaku-Dojin, Japan; Shanghai BBT, China)

== Films ==
- 2000 – The Difference (Channel Four, UK)
- 2002 – The Real King and Queen (Discovery Channel)
- 2003 – Journey of Man (PBS/National Geographic Channel) – CINE Golden Eagle award
- 2004 – Quest for the Phoenicians (PBS)
- 2005 – Search for Adam (National Geographic Channel)
- 2007 – China's Secret Mummies (National Geographic Channel) – nominated for Outstanding Historical Programming Emmy
- 2009 – The Human Family Tree (National Geographic Channel) – nominated for Outstanding Science and Technology Programming Emmy

== See also ==
- Recent single-origin hypothesis
- Y-chromosomal Adam
- The Genographic Project
