= Rebecca L. Cann =

American geneticist (born 1951)

- Born: 1951 (age 74–75); Burlington, Iowa, United States
- Education: University of California, Berkeley
- Known for: Mitochondrial Eve; Out of Africa theory
- Scientific career
- Fields: Anthropology, genetics, ornithology
- Workplaces: University of Hawaiʻi at Mānoa
- Doctoral advisor: Allan Wilson

Rebecca L. Cann (born 1951) is a geneticist who made a scientific breakthrough on mitochondrial DNA variation and evolution in humans, popularly called Mitochondrial Eve. Her discovery that all living humans are genetically descended from a single African mother who lived <200,000 years ago became the foundation of the Out of Africa theory, the most widely accepted explanation of the origin of all modern humans. She is currently Professor in the Department of Cell and Molecular Biology at the University of Hawaiʻi at Mānoa.

== Early life and education ==
Rebecca Cann was born in 1951 and spent her childhood at Des Moines, Iowa, where she completed her elementary schooling. In a summer, just before she started high school, her family moved to San Francisco, California. In 1967 she entered an all-girl Catholic High School in California. She earned a Bachelor of Science (BS) degree with a major in genetics at University of California, Berkeley in 1972. She then worked at Cutter Laboratories at Berkeley for five years (1972-1977) after finishing college, where she worked on macaque serum proteins and learned the techniques for constructing phylogenetic trees, which would be pivotal for her later achievements. She continued at University of California, Berkeley for her doctorate in genetics under the supervision of Allan Wilson of the Department of Biochemistry, and graduated in 1982. She got a Postdoctoral Fellowship at Howard Hughes Medical Institute (HHMI) of the University of California, San Francisco (UCSF). She joined the faculty of the Department of Genetics, University of Hawaiʻi at Mānoa in 1986.

== Mitochondrial Eve ==
Cann laid the experimental groundwork for the concept of Mitochondrial Eve, and the consequent Out of Africa theory. From late 1970s she had collected mtDNA samples from women of different ethnic backgrounds, such as from Asia, South Pacific, Europe and Americans of African descent. The data were used in her PhD thesis in 1982. Following her research, a junior graduate student Mark Stoneking added samples from aboriginal Australians and New Guineans. In 1987, after a year of delay, their collective paper was published in Nature in which their findings indicated that all living humans were descended through a single mother, who lived ~200,000 years ago in Africa. The theoretical mother of all humans popularly became the Mitochondrial Eve, and the underlying concept directly implies recent African origin of modern humans, hence, the tenet of the so-called Out of Africa theory.

== Personal life ==
She retains the surname Cann from her former husband whom she married in 1972, right after her graduation from Berkeley. In fact she helped her then husband through his graduate school and only when he finished, she started attending graduate school.

Cann was featured on MidWeek's cover on 19 March 1997 for her Mitochondrial Eve.

== Bibliography ==
- Wilson AC, Stoneking M, Cann RL, Prager EM, Ferris SD, Wrischnik LA, Higuchi RG. 1987. Mitochondrial clans and the age of our common mother. In: Human Genetics: Proceedings of the Seventh International Congress, Berlin 1986. F Vogel and K Sperling (eds.), Springer-Verlag, Berlin, pages 158–164. ISBN 978-3642716379
- Stoneking M, Cann RL. 1989. African origin of human mitochondrial DNA. In: The Human Revolution: Behavioural and Biological Perspectives on the Origins of Modern Humans. P Mellars and C Stringer (eds.), Edinburgh University Press, Edinburgh, pages 17–30. ISBN 978-0691085395
- Rebecca L. Cann. 1996. Mitochondrial DNA and human evolution. In: Origins of the Human Brain. JP Changeux, J Chavaillon (eds). New York: Oxford University Press. ISBN 9780198523901
- Cann RL. 1997. Chapter 4: Mothers, Labels, and Misogyny. In: Women in Human Evolution. Hager LD (ed). Routledge, London, UK, pages 75–89. ISBN 9780415108331
- Diller KC, Cann RL. 2009. Evidence against a genetic-based revolution in language 50,000 years ago. In: The Cradle of Language. R Botha, C Knight (eds). New York: Oxford University Press. pages 135–149. ISBN 9780199545865
- Diller KC, Cann RL. 2011. Molecular perspectives on human evolution. In: The Oxford Handbook of Language Evolution. KR Gibson, M Tallerman (eds). New York: Oxford University Press. ISBN 9780199541119
