= Allan Wilson (biologist) =

New Zealand biologist (1934–1991)

Allan Wilson FRS
- Allan C. Wilson (courtesy of the Allan Wilson Centre for Molecular Ecology and Evolution)
- Born: Allan Charles Wilson; 18 October 1934; Ngāruawāhia, New Zealand
- Died: 21 July 1991 (aged 56); Seattle, United States
- Citizenship: New Zealand
- Education: University of Otago (B.Sc.) Washington State University (M.S.) University of California, Berkeley (Ph.D.)
- Known for: Molecular clock Mitochondrial Eve
- Awards: MacArthur Fellowship
- Scientific career
- Fields: Zoology; Biochemistry
- Institutions: University of California, Berkeley
- Thesis: Control of flavin synthesis by bacteria (1961)
- Doctoral advisor: Arthur Pardee
- Other academic advisors: Nathan O. Kaplan
- Notable students: Svante Pääbo; Mary-Claire King; Vincent Sarich; Rebecca L. Cann; Mark Stoneking

Allan Charles Wilson FRS AAA&S (18 October 1934 – 21 July 1991) was a New Zealand biologist and biochemist, who was a professor of biochemistry at the University of California, Berkeley, a pioneer in the use of molecular approaches to understand evolutionary change and reconstruct phylogenies, and a revolutionary contributor to the study of human evolution. He was one of the most significant figures in post-war biology; his work attracted a great deal of attention both from within and outside the academic world. He is the only New Zealander to have won the MacArthur Fellowship.

He is best known for experimental demonstration of the concept of the molecular clock (with his doctoral student Vincent Sarich), which was theoretically postulated by Linus Pauling and Emile Zuckerkandl, revolutionary insights into the nature of the molecular anthropology of higher primates and human evolution, and the so-called Mitochondrial Eve hypothesis (with his doctoral students Rebecca L. Cann and Mark Stoneking).

== Early life and education ==
Allan Wilson was born in Ngāruawāhia, New Zealand, and raised on his family's rural dairy farm at Helvetia, Pukekohe, about twenty miles south of Auckland. At his local Sunday School, the vicar's wife was impressed by young Allan's interest in evolution and encouraged Allan's mother to enroll him at the elite King's College secondary school in Auckland. There he excelled in mathematics, chemistry, and sports. Wilson already had an interest in evolution and biochemistry, but intended to be the first in his family to attend university by pursuing studies in agriculture and animal science. Wilson met Professor Campbell Percy McMeekan, a New Zealand pioneer in animal science, who suggested that Wilson attend the University of Otago in southern New Zealand to further his study in biochemistry rather than veterinary science. Wilson gained a BSc from the University of Otago in 1955, majoring in both zoology and biochemistry. The bird physiologist Donald S. Farner met Wilson as an undergraduate at Otago and invited him to Washington State University at Pullman as his graduate student. Wilson obliged and completed a master's degree in zoology at WSU under Farner in 1957, where he worked on the effects of photoperiod on the physiology of birds.

Wilson then moved to the University of California, Berkeley, to pursue his doctoral research. At the time the family thought Allan would only be gone two years. Instead, Wilson remained in the United States, gaining his PhD at Berkeley in 1961 under the direction of biochemist Arthur Pardee for work on the regulation of flavin biosynthesis in bacteria. From 1961 to 1964, Wilson studied as a post-doc under biochemist Nathan O. Kaplan at Brandeis University in Waltham, Massachusetts. In Kaplan's lab, working with lactate and malate dehydrogenases, Wilson was first introduced to the nascent field of molecular evolution. Nate Kaplan was one of the very earliest pioneers to address phylogenetic problems with evidence from protein molecules, an approach that Wilson later famously applied to human evolution and primate relationships. After Brandeis, Wilson returned to Berkeley where he set up his own lab in the Biochemistry department, remaining there for the rest of his life.

== Career and scientific contributions ==
=== Molecular clock ===
Wilson joined the UC Berkeley faculty of biochemistry in 1964, and was promoted to full professor in 1972. His first major scientific contribution was published as Immunological Time-Scale For Hominid Evolution in the journal Science in December 1967. With his student Vincent Sarich, he showed that evolutionary relationships of the human species with other primates, in particular the great apes (humans, chimpanzees, gorillas and orangutans), could be inferred from molecular evidence obtained from living species, rather than solely from fossils of extinct creatures. Their microcomplement fixation method (see complement system) measured the strength of the immune reaction between an antigen (serum albumin) from one species and an antibody raised against the same antigen in another species. The strength of the antibody-antigen reaction was known to be stronger between more closely related species: their innovation was to measure it quantitatively among many species pairs as an "immunological distance". When these distances were plotted against the divergence times of species pair with well-established evolutionary histories, the data showed that the molecular difference increased linearly with time, in what was termed a "molecular clock". Given this calibration curve, the time of divergence between species pairs with unknown or uncertain fossil histories could be inferred. Most controversially, their data suggested that divergence times between humans, chimpanzees, and gorillas were on the order of 3~5 million years, far less than the estimates of 9~30 million years accepted by conventional paleoanthropologists from fossil hominids such as Ramapithecus. This 'recent origin' theory of human/ape divergence remained controversial until the discovery of the "Lucy" fossils, in 1974, definitively dated in 1992 as between 3.22 and 3.18 million years.

=== Protein phylogeny ===
Wilson and another PhD student Mary-Claire King subsequently compared several lines of genetic evidence (immunology, amino acid differences, and protein electrophoresis) on the divergence of humans and chimpanzees, and showed that all methods agreed that the two species were >99% similar. Given the large organismal differences between the two species in the absence of large genetic differences, King and Wilson proposed that it was not structural gene differences that were responsible for species differences, but gene regulation of those differences, that is, the timing and manner in which near-identical gene products are assembled during embryology and development. In combination with the "molecular clock" hypothesis, this contrasted sharply with the accepted view that larger or smaller organismal differences were due to large or smaller amounts of genetic divergence.

=== Mitochondrial Eve ===
In the early 1980s, Wilson further disturbed and refined traditional anthropological thinking by his work with PhD students Rebecca Cann and Mark Stoneking on the so-called "Mitochondrial Eve" hypothesis. In his efforts to identify informative genetic markers for tracking human evolutionary history, he focused on mitochondrial DNA (mtDNA) – genes that are found in mitochondria organelles in the cytoplasm of the cell outside the nucleus. Because of its location in the cytoplasm, mtDNA is passed exclusively from mother to child, the father making no contribution, and in the absence of genetic recombination defines female lineages over evolutionary timescales. Because it also mutates rapidly, it is possible to measure the small genetic differences among individual within species and between closely related species by restriction endonuclease gene mapping. Wilson, Cann, and Stoneking measured differences among many individuals from different human continental groups, and found that humans from Africa showed the greatest inter-individual differences, consistent with an African origin of the human species (the Recent African origin of modern humans or "Out of Africa" hypothesis). The data further indicated that all living humans shared a common maternal ancestor, who lived in Africa only a few hundreds of thousands of years ago. This common ancestor became widely known in the media and popular culture as the Mitochondrial Eve. This had the unfortunate and erroneous implication that only a single female lived at that time, when in fact the occurrence of a coalescent ancestor is a necessary consequence of population genetic theory, and the Mitochondrial Eve would have been only one of many humans (male and female) alive at that time. This finding was, like his earlier results, not readily accepted by anthropologists. The conventional hypothesis had been that various human continental groups had evolved from diverse ancestors, over several millions of years since divergence from chimpanzees. The mtDNA data, however, strongly support the alternative and now generally accepted hypothesis, that all humans descend relatively recently from a common, relatively small African population.

== Death and legacy ==
Wilson became ill with leukaemia, and after a bone marrow transplant, died on Sunday, 21 July 1991, at the Fred Hutchinson Memorial Cancer Research Center in Seattle. He had been scheduled to give the keynote address at an international conference the same day. He was 56, at the height of his scientific recognition and powers. He was survived by his wife, Leona Wilson (died in 2009), and two children, Ruth (1961-2014), of East Lansing, Michigan, and David (born 1964), of San Francisco.

Wilson's success can be attributed to his strong interest and depth of knowledge in biochemistry and evolutionary biology, his insistence of quantification of evolutionary phenomena, and his early recognition of new molecular techniques that could shed light on questions of evolutionary biology. After development of quantitative immunological methods, his lab was the first to recognise restriction endonuclease mapping analysis as a quantitative evolutionary genetic method, which led to his early use of DNA sequencing, and the then-nascent technique of PCR to obtain large DNA sets for genetic analysis of populations. He trained scores of undergraduate, graduate (17 women and 17 men received their doctoral degrees in his lab), and post-doctoral students in molecular evolutionary biology, including sabbatical visitors from six continents. His lab published more than 300 technical papers, and was recognised in the 1970s ~ 80s as the mecca for those wishing to enter the field of molecular evolution.

The Allan Wilson Centre for Molecular Ecology and Evolution was established in 2002 in his honour to advance knowledge of the evolution and ecology of New Zealand and Pacific plant and animal life, and human history in the Pacific. The Centre was under the Massey University, at Palmerston North, New Zealand, as a national collaboration among the University of Auckland, Victoria University of Wellington, the University of Otago, University of Canterbury, and the New Zealand Institute for Plant and Food Research. The Centre closed at the end of 2015 when the Government stopped funding it.

A 41-minute documentary film of his life entitled Allan Wilson, Evolutionary: Biochemist, Biologist, Giant of Molecular Biology was released by Films Media Group in 2008.

Wilson introduced genome sequencing of ancient DNA to his post-doctoral scholar, Svante Pääbo, who carried on the research at the Max Planck Institute for Evolutionary Anthropology. Pääbo became the sole recipient of the Nobel Prize in Physiology or Medicine in 2022 "for his discoveries concerning the genomes of extinct hominins and human evolution".

=== Awards and honours ===
- MacArthur Fellow in 1986
- Guggenheim Fellow in 1972
- 3M Life Sciences Award from the Federation of American Societies for Experimental Biology in 1991
- Elected Fellow of the Royal Society of London
- Member of the American Academy of Arts and Sciences
- Golden Plate Award of the American Academy of Achievement in 1988
- Member of the Human Genome Organization
- Associate editor of the Journal of Molecular Evolution
