= Most recent common ancestor =

Most recent individual from which all organisms in a group are directly descended

A most recent common ancestor (MRCA), also known as a last common ancestor (LCA) or concestor (a term coined by Nicky Warren), is the most recent individual from which all organisms of a set are inferred to have descended. The most recent common ancestor of a higher taxon is generally assumed to have been a species. The term is also used in reference to the ancestry of groups of genes (haplotypes) rather than organisms.

The ancestry of a set of individuals can sometimes be determined by referring to an established pedigree, although this may refer only to patrilineal or matrilineal lines for sexually-reproducing organisms with two parents, four grandparents, etc. However, in general, it is impossible to identify the exact MRCA of a large set of individuals, but an estimate of the time at which the MRCA lived can often be given. Such time to most recent common ancestor (TMRCA) estimates can be given based on DNA test results and established mutation rates as practiced in genetic genealogy, or by reference to a non-genetic, mathematical model or computer simulation.

In organisms using sexual reproduction, the matrilineal MRCA and patrilineal MRCA are the MRCAs of a given population considering only matrilineal and patrilineal descent, respectively. The MRCA of a population by definition cannot be older than either its matrilineal or its patrilineal MRCA. In the case of Homo sapiens, the matrilineal and patrilineal MRCA are also known as "Mitochondrial Eve" (mt-MRCA) and "Y-chromosomal Adam" (Y-MRCA) respectively. The age of the human MRCA is unknown. It is no greater than the age of either the Y-MRCA or the mt-MRCA, estimated at 200,000 years.

Unlike in pedigrees of individual humans or domesticated lineages where historical parentage is known for some number of generations into the past, ancestors are not directly observable or recognizable in the inference of relationships among species or higher groups of taxa (systematics or phylogenetics). Ancestors are inferences based on patterns of relationship among taxa inferred in a phylogenetic analysis of extant organisms and/or fossils.

The last universal common ancestor (LUCA) is the most recent common ancestor of all current life on Earth, estimated to have lived some 3.5 to 3.8 billion years ago (in the Paleoarchean). (Note: The composition of the LUCA is not directly accessible as a fossil, but can be studied by comparing the genomes of its descendants, organisms living today. By this means, a 2016 study identified a set of 355 genes inferred to have been present in the LUCA.)

== MRCA of different species ==
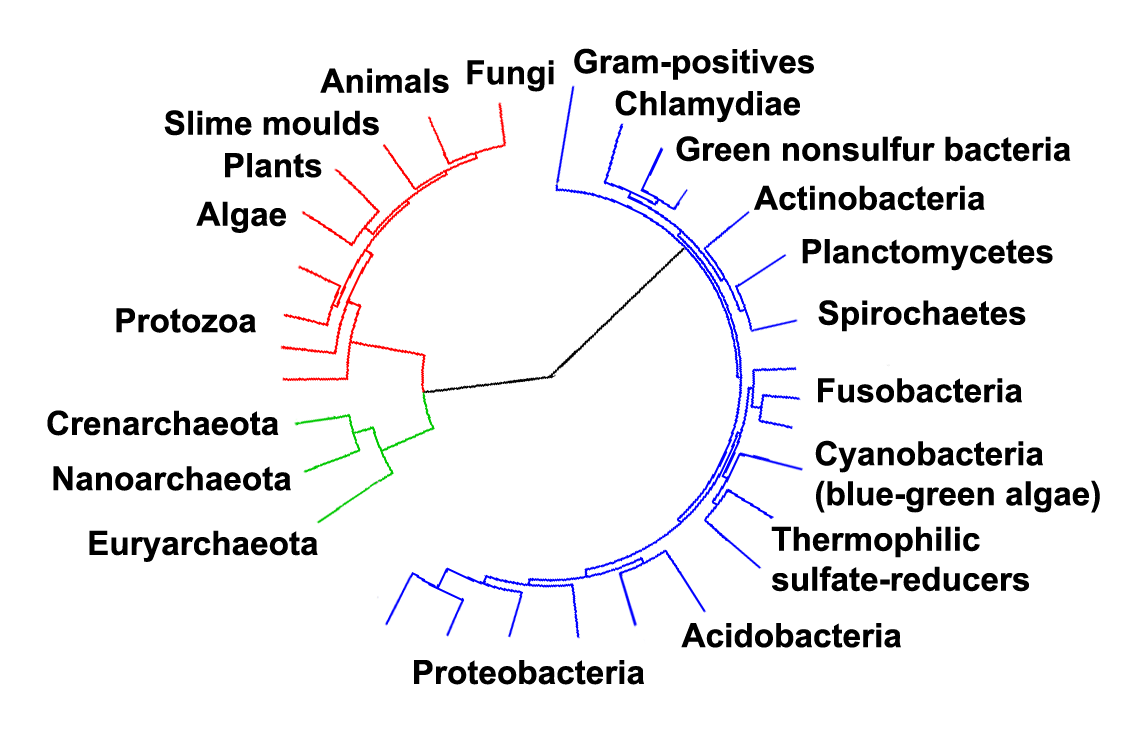
Evolutionary tree showing the divergence of modern species from the last universal ancestor in the center. The three domains are colored, with bacteria blue, archaea green, and eukaryotes red.

The project of a complete description of the phylogenetic relationships among all biological species is dubbed the "tree of life". This involves inference of ages of divergence for all hypothesized clades; for example, the MRCA of all Carnivora (cats, dogs, etc.) is estimated to have diverged some 42 million years ago (Miacidae).

The concept of the last common ancestor from the perspective of human evolution is described for a popular audience in The Ancestor's Tale by Richard Dawkins. Dawkins lists "concestors" of the human lineage in order of increasing age, including hominin (human–chimpanzee), hominine (human–gorilla), hominid (human–orangutan), hominoid (human–gibbon), and so on in 40 stages in total, down to the last universal common ancestor (human–bacteria).

== MRCA of a population identified by a single genetic marker ==
It is also possible to consider the ancestry of individual genes (or groups of genes, haplotypes) instead of an organism as a whole. Coalescent theory describes a stochastic model of how the ancestry of such genetic markers maps to the history of a population.

Unlike organisms, a gene is passed down from a generation of organisms to the next generation either as perfect replicas of itself or as slightly mutated descendant genes. While organisms have ancestry graphs and progeny graphs via sexual reproduction, a gene has a single chain of ancestors and a tree of descendants. An organism produced by sexual cross-fertilization (allogamy) has at least two ancestors (its immediate parents), but a gene always has one ancestor per generation.

== Patrilineal and matrilineal MRCA ==
Through random drift or selection, lineage will trace back to a single person. In this example over 5 generations, the colors represent extinct matrilineal lines and black the matrilineal line descended from the mt-MRCA.

Mitochondrial DNA (mtDNA) is nearly immune to sexual mixing, unlike the nuclear DNA whose chromosomes are shuffled and recombined in Mendelian inheritance. Mitochondrial DNA, therefore, can be used to trace matrilineal inheritance and to find the Mitochondrial Eve (also known as the African Eve), the most recent common ancestor of all humans via the mitochondrial DNA pathway.

Likewise, Y chromosome is present as a single sex chromosome in the male individual and is passed on to male descendants without recombination. It can be used to trace patrilineal inheritance and to find the Y-chromosomal Adam, the most recent common ancestor of all humans via the Y-DNA pathway.

Approximate dates for Mitochondrial Eve and Y-chromosomal Adam have been established by researchers using genealogical DNA tests. Mitochondrial Eve is estimated to have lived about 200,000 years ago. A paper published in March 2013 determined that, with 95% confidence and that provided there are no systematic errors in the study's data, Y-chromosomal Adam lived between 237,000 and 581,000 years ago.

The MRCA of all humans alive today would, therefore, need to have lived more recently than either. (Note: Notions such as Mitochondrial Eve and Y-chromosomal Adam yield common ancestors that are more ancient than for all living humans.)

It is more complicated to infer human ancestry via autosomal chromosomes. Although an autosomal chromosome contains genes that are passed down from parents to children via independent assortment from only one of the two parents, genetic recombination (chromosomal crossover) mixes genes from non-sister chromatids from both parents during meiosis, thus changing the genetic composition of the chromosome.

== Time to MRCA estimates ==
Different types of MRCAs are estimated to have lived at different times in the past. These time to MRCA (TMRCA) estimates are also computed differently depending on the type of MRCA being considered. Patrilineal and matrilineal MRCAs (Mitochondrial Eve and Y-chromosomal Adam) are traced by single gene markers, thus their TMRCA are computed based on DNA test results and established mutation rates as practiced in genetic genealogy. The time to the genealogical MRCA (most recent common ancestor by any line of descent) of all living humans cannot be traced genetically because the DNA of the great majority of ancestors is completely lost after a few hundred years. It is therefore computed based on non-genetic, mathematical models and computer simulations.

Since Mitochondrial Eve and Y-chromosomal Adam are traced by single genes via a single ancestral parent line, the time to these genetic MRCAs will necessarily be greater than that for the genealogical MRCA. This is because single genes will coalesce more slowly than tracing of conventional human genealogy via both parents. The latter considers only individual humans, without taking into account whether any gene from the computed MRCA actually survives in every single person in the current population.

=== TMRCA via genetic markers ===
Mitochondrial DNA can be used to trace the ancestry of a set of populations. In this case, populations are defined by the accumulation of mutations on the mtDNA, and special trees are created for the mutations and the order in which they occurred in each population. The tree is formed through the testing of a large number of individuals all over the world for the presence or lack of a certain set of mutations. Once this is done it is possible to determine how many mutations separate one population from another. The number of mutations, together with estimated mutation rate of the mtDNA in the regions tested, allows scientists to determine the approximate time to MRCA (TMRCA) which indicates time passed since the populations last shared the same set of mutations or belonged to the same haplogroup.

In the case of Y-Chromosomal DNA, TMRCA is arrived at in a different way. Y-DNA haplogroups are defined by single-nucleotide polymorphism in various regions of the Y-DNA. The time to MRCA within a haplogroup is defined by the accumulation of mutations in STR sequences of the Y-Chromosome of that haplogroup only. Y-DNA network analysis of Y-STR haplotypes showing a non-star cluster indicates Y-STR variability due to multiple founding individuals. Analysis yielding a star cluster can be regarded as representing a population descended from a single ancestor. In this case the variability of the Y-STR sequence, also called the microsatellite variation, can be regarded as a measure of the time passed since the ancestor founded this particular population. The descendants of Genghis Khan or one of his ancestors represents a famous star cluster that can be dated back to the time of Genghis Khan.

TMRCA calculations are considered critical evidence when attempting to determine migration dates of various populations as they spread around the world. For example, if a mutation is deemed to have occurred 30,000 years ago, then this mutation should be found amongst all populations that diverged after this date. If archeological evidence indicates cultural spread and formation of regionally isolated populations then this must be reflected in the isolation of subsequent genetic mutations in this region. If genetic divergence and regional divergence coincide it can be concluded that the observed divergence is due to migration as evidenced by the archaeological record. However, if the date of genetic divergence occurs at a different time than the archaeological record, then scientists will have to look at alternate archaeological evidence to explain the genetic divergence. The issue is best illustrated in the debate surrounding the demic diffusion versus cultural diffusion during the European Neolithic.

=== TMRCA of all living humans ===
The age of the MRCA of all living humans is unknown. It is necessarily no older than the age of either the matrilinear or the patrilinear MRCA, both of which have an estimated age of between roughly 100,000 and 200,000 years ago.

A study by mathematicians Joseph T. Chang, Douglas Rohde and Steve Olson used a theoretical model to calculate that the MRCA may have lived remarkably recently, possibly as recently as 2,000 years ago. It concludes that the MRCA of all living humans probably lived in East Asia, which would have given them key access to extremely isolated populations in Australia and the Americas. Possible locations for the MRCA include places such as the Chukchi and Kamchatka Peninsulas that are close to Alaska, places such as Indonesia and Malaysia that are close to Australia or a place such as Taiwan or Japan that is more intermediate to Australia and the Americas. European colonization of the Americas and Australia was found by Chang to be too recent to have had a substantial impact on the age of the MRCA. In fact, if the Americas and Australia had never been discovered by Europeans, the MRCA would only be about 2.3% further back in the past than it is.

Note that the age of the MRCA of a population does not correspond to a population bottleneck, let alone a "first couple". It rather reflects the presence of a single individual with high reproductive success in the past, whose genetic contribution has become pervasive throughout the population over time. It is also incorrect to assume that the MRCA passed all, or indeed any, genetic information to every living person. Through sexual reproduction, an ancestor passes half of his or her genes to each descendant in the next generation; in the absence of pedigree collapse, after just 32 generations the contribution of a single ancestor would be on the order of 2^{−32}, a number proportional to less than a single basepair within the human genome.

== Identical ancestors point ==
The MRCA is the most recent common ancestor shared by all individuals in the population under consideration. This MRCA may well have contemporaries who are also ancestral to some but not all of the extant population. The identical ancestors point is a point in the past more remote than the MRCA at which time there are no longer organisms which are ancestral to some but not all of the modern population. Due to pedigree collapse, modern individuals may still exhibit clustering, due to vastly different contributions from each member of the ancestral population.

== See also ==
- Cladistics
- Common descent
- Coalescent theory, a retrospective model of population genetics
- Crown group
- Genealogy, the study of families and the tracing of their lineages and history
- Genetic distance, the genetic divergence between species or between populations within a species
- Lowest common ancestor, an analogous concept in graph theory and computer science
- Phylogenetic tree, a branching diagram or "tree" showing the inferred evolutionary relationships among various biological species
- Timeline of evolution, outlines the major events in the development of life on the planet Earth
- Timeline of human evolution, outlines the major events in the development of the human species
- Last universal common ancestor, the most recent common ancestor of all life
