= The Journey of Man =

2002 book by Spencer Wells

The Journey of Man: A Genetic Odyssey
- Author: Spencer Wells
- Language: English
- Subject: Human evolutionary genetics
- Publisher: Princeton University Press
- Publication date: 2002
- Publication place: United States
- ISBN: 0-8129-7146-9
- OCLC: 53287806
- Dewey Decimal: 599.93/8 22
- LC Class: GN281 .W44 2003

The Journey of Man: A Genetic Odyssey is a 2002 book by Spencer Wells, an American geneticist and anthropologist, in which he uses techniques and theories of genetics and evolutionary biology to trace the geographical dispersal of early human migrations out of Africa. The book was made into a TV documentary entitled Journey of Man in 2003.

== Synopsis ==
According to the recent single-origin hypothesis, human ancestors originated in Africa, and eventually made their way out to the rest of the world. Analysis of the Y chromosome is one of the methods used in tracing the history of early humans. Thirteen genetic markers on the Y-chromosome differentiate populations of human beings.

It is believed, on the basis of genetic evidence, that all human beings in existence now descend from one single man who lived in Africa about 60,000 years ago. The earliest groups of humans are believed to find their present-day descendants among the San people, a group that is now found in western southern Africa. The San are smaller than the Bantu. They have lighter skins, more tightly curled hair, and they share the epicanthal fold with the people of Central, South East Asia, Central Africa, Northern Europe, and the Arctic.

Southern and eastern Africa are believed to originally have been populated by people akin to the San. Since that early time much of their range has been taken over by the Bantu. Skeletal remains of these ancestral people are found in Paleolithic sites in Somalia and Ethiopia. There are also peoples in east Africa today who speak substantially different languages that nevertheless share the archaic characteristics of the San language, with its distinctive repertoire of click and pop sounds. These are the only languages in the entire world that use these sounds in speech.

As humans migrated out of Africa, they all carried a genetic marker on the Y chromosome known as M168 (Haplogroup CT (Y-DNA)).

The first wave of migration out of Africa stayed close to the oceans shores, tracing a band along the coastal areas of the Indian Ocean including parts of the Arabian Peninsula, the Middle East, the Indian subcontinent and into South East Asia, down into what is now Indonesia, and eventually reaching Australia. This branch of the human family developed a new marker M130 (Haplogroup C (Y-DNA)).

This first wave appears to have left dark-skinned people along its path, including isolated groups of dark-skinned people in south east Asia such as the aboriginal population of the Andaman Islands (around 400 km off the west coast of Thailand), the Semang of Malaysia, and the Aeta of the Philippines.

The second wave of migration took a more northerly course, splitting somewhere in the area around what is now called Syria to sweep to interior Asia, where it split several more times in Central Asia, north of Afghanistan. The lineages that flowed into Central Asia carry M9 (Haplogroup K (Y-DNA)). Other markers were added after the migration paths went on in several different directions from Central Asia.

From Central Asia, a small group migrated towards the northeast, following reindeer. These were the ancestors of Siberian groups such as the Chukchi people, a few of whom still live a nomadic lifestyle today. An even smaller group, estimated at no more than 20, crossed what is now the Bering Sea approximately 15,000 years ago during the last glacial period, and migrated into North America. They are the ancestors of Native Americans, and 800 years later, they had reached as far as South America.

The African diaspora is believed to have begun some 50,000 years ago, long enough for many changes to have occurred in humans remaining in Africa. The genetic trends reported involve humans who left Africa, and their genetic histories. The diversity found outside of Africa may well have been accentuated since populations migrating to new hunting grounds would rarely have had individuals moving backwards into previously settled regions. But within Africa, isolation would have been geographically aided primarily by the Sahara Desert, leaving people in areas not separated by the desert to travel and migrate relatively freely.

== See also ==
- Human mitochondrial DNA haplogroup for the female lineage
- Human Y-chromosome DNA haplogroup for the male lineage
- Mitochondrial Eve
- Recent African origin of modern humans

== Bibliography ==
- The journey of man: a genetic odyssey - by Spencer Wells - Princeton University Press, 2002 (Digitised online by Google Books), ISBN 0-8129-7146-9
