= Mark Stoneking =

American geneticist (born 1956)

- Born: 1 August 1956 (age 70)
- Citizenship: United States
- Education: University of California, Berkeley
- Known for: Mitochondrial Eve; Out of Africa Theory
- Awards: See text
- Scientific career
- Fields: Anthropology, population genetics
- Workplaces: Max Planck Institute for Evolutionary Anthropology
- Doctoral advisor: Allan Wilson

Mark Stoneking (born 1 August 1956) is a geneticist currently working as the Group Leader of the Max Planck Institute for Evolutionary Anthropology, of Max Planck Gesellschaft at the University of Leipzig, Germany. He is also Honorary Professor of Biological Anthropology. He works in the field of human evolution, especially the genetic evolution, origin and dispersal of modern humans. He, along with his doctoral advisor Allan Wilson and a fellow researcher Rebecca L. Cann, contributed to the "Out of Africa" theory in 1987 by introducing the concept of Mitochondrial Eve, a hypothetical common mother of all living humans based on mitochondrial DNA.

== Education ==
Stoneking studied an undergraduate course in anthropology from 1974 at the University of Oregon, United States, from where he obtained a Bachelor of Arts (B.A.) degree in 1977. He shifted to the Pennsylvania State University to obtain MS in genetics in 1979, and subsequently a similar master's degree from University of Wisconsin, Madison in 1981. His master's degree was on evolutionary genetics of salmonid fish. Captivated by the emerging research on mitochondrial DNA, in 1981 he joined Allan Wilson, a renowned biochemist at the Department of Biochemistry, University of California, Berkeley, under whose supervision he got a PhD in 1986. His research was on human mtDNA variation, a follow-up of the work of Rebecca Cann, who was just completing her doctoral thesis from the same supervisor. He continued as postdoctoral fellow in 1986 at Berkeley and completed it in 1988.

== Professional career and contributions ==
In 1989, he joined the Human Genome Center at the Lawrence Berkeley Laboratory, Berkeley, as a staff scientist. Then he worked as an Associate Research Scientist at the Department of Human Genetics, Cetus Corporation, Emeryville, California for a year. In 1990, he entered the faculty of assistant professor the Department of Anthropology, Pennsylvania State University as assistant professor. He was promoted to associate professor in 1994 and a full professor in 1998. During 1996-1997 he served as a visiting professor at the Zoology Institute, LMU Munich, Germany. In 1999, he got an appointment in the Department of Evolutionary Genetics, Max Planck Institute for Evolutionary Anthropology, Leipzig, as the Group Leader. He concurrently serves as an honorary professor of biological anthropology at the University of Leipzig.

He has been an associate editor of the Journal of Human Evolution (from 1990 to 1993), Human Biology (1993–1997), BioEssays (2004 to present), Anthropological Science, (2004 to present), Evolutionary Biology (Springer Nature, 2007 to present), BMC Genetics (2008 to present), Gene (2009–2010), Investigative Genetics (2009 to present), EMBO Reports (2010 to present), and Language Dynamics and Change (2010 to present). He is also senior editor of the Annals of Human Genetics from 2008 to present. He has been in the technical working group, DNA Analysis Methods of FBI between 1993 and 1998, Defense Science Board Task Force on DNA Technology for Identification of Ancient Remains (1994–1995), Wellcome Trust Bioarchaeology Panel (2001–2005), Steering Committee for National Energy Research Council (NERC) Program on Environmental Factors and the Chronology of Human Evolution and Dispersal (EFCHED) (2001–2006). He is also a member of the advisory committee, The Role of Culture in Early Expansions of Humans, Heidelberg Academy of Sciences since 2008; advisory board, US National Evolutionary Synthesis Center since 2011; and chair, scientific advisory committee of the Program on Forensics and Ethnicity, Philippine Genome Center, since 2011.

== Legacy ==
=== Mitochondrial Eve ===
Stoneking came to prominence both in the academic and media circles with his work on mitochondrial DNA variation among different human populations. He started under the supervision of Allan Wilson and following the pioneering work of his senior graduate student, Rebecca Cann. Cann had collected data from different human populations, including those of Asians, Africans, and Europeans. Then Stoneking added data from aboriginal Australians and New Guineans. In 1987, after a year of pending, their paper was published in Nature in which their findings indicated that all living humans were descended through a single mother, who lived ~200,000 years ago in Africa. The common hypothetical mother is dubbed Mitochondrial Eve, and the concept directly implies recent African origin of modern humans, hence, the underpinning of the so-called "Recent Out of Africa" theory. In spite of criticisms, and religious antagonisms, even after two decades he still holds this view to be as valid as any scientific theory since a number independent research also corroborates their original human mtDNA phylogenetic tree.

=== Other aspects of human evolution ===
Origin of clothing and lice. Stoneking and his team announced an interesting discovery in 2003 on the evolution of lice, and its relation to the origin of wearing cloth. Their comparison of two mtDNA and two nuclear DNA from human head lice and body lice, along with a chimpanzee louse revealed that human started to wear clothes some 72,000 years ago (give or take 42,000 years). This could be inferred because the age is when the body lice evolved from the head lice according to the molecular clock.

Human hair. Stoneking has also pioneered the genetic basis of different hair colours and baldness in men. His team had found that human androgen receptor gene is the major factor associated with baldness in men. They also identified tyrosinase-related protein 1 (TYRP1) as a major determinant of blond hair among the Melanesians of Solomon Islands.

Culture as a factor of human evolution. Stoneking believes that culture has a massive influence on human evolution, and may actually increase the rate of human evolution. He argues that cultural differences are a major signal of selection in genomes, which have been accumulating recently and indicate that humans continue to evolve.

== Awards and honours ==
- National Science Foundation Graduate Fellowship, 1977–1978, 1979–1981
- Pennsylvania State University Graduate Fellowship, 1978–1979
- Ernest Brown Babcock Scholarship, University of California, Berkeley, 1985–1986
- John Belling Prize in Genetics, University of California, Berkeley, 1990
- University of Oregon Outstanding Young Alumnus Award, 1990
- Japanese Society for the Promotion of Science Fellowship, 1995
- FBI Award for Service to the Forensic DNA Community, 1998
- Fellow, American Association for the Advancement of Science, 2000

== Filmography ==
Stoneking has appeared in

- Becoming Human: First Steps (NOVA) 2009
- Becoming Human: Birth of Humanity (NOVA) 2009
- Where did we come from? (Nova) 2011

== Bibliography ==
- Stoneking M, Bhatia K, Wilson AC. 1986. Mitochondrial DNA variation in Eastern Highlanders of Papua New Guinea. In: Genetic Variation and its Maintenance. D.F. Roberts and G. DeStefano (eds.), Cambridge University Press, Cambridge, pp. 87–100. ISBN 978-0521064576
- Wilson AC, Stoneking M, Cann RL, Prager EM, Ferris SD, Wrischnik LA, Higuchi RG. 1987. Mitochondrial clans and the age of our common mother. In: Human Genetics, Proceedings of the Seventh International Congress, Berlin 1986. F. Vogel and K. Sperling (eds.), Springer-Verlag, Berlin, pp. 158–164. ISBN 978-3642716379
- Stoneking M, Cann RL. 1989. African origin of human mitochondrial DNA. In: The Human Revolution: Behavioural and Biological Perspectives on the Origins of Modern Humans. P. Mellars and C. Stringer (eds.), Edinburgh University Press, Edinburgh, pp. 17–30. ISBN 978-0691085395
- Stoneking M, Wilson AC. 1989. Mitochondrial DNA. In: The Colonization of the Pacific: A Genetic Trail. A.V.S. Hill and S.W. Serjeantson (eds.), Oxford University Press, Oxford, pp. 215–245.
- Bonnichsen R, Beatty MT, Turner MD, Stoneking M. 1996. What can be learned from hair? A hair record from the Mammoth Meadow locus, southwestern Montana. In: Prehistoric Mongoloid Dispersals. T. Akazawa and E. J. E. Szathmary (eds.), Oxford University Press, Oxford, pp. 201–213.
- Stoneking M. 1996. Mitochondrial DNA variation and human evolution. In: Human Genome Evolution. M. Jackson, T. Strachan, and G. Dover (eds.), BIOS Scientific Publishers, Oxford, pp. 263–281
- Stoneking M. 1997. Recent African origin of human mitochondrial DNA: a review of the evidence and current status of the hypothesis. In: Progress in Population Genetics and Human Evolution. P. Donnelly and S. Tavare (eds.), Springer-Verlag, New York, pp. 1–13.
- Deininger PL, Sherry ST, Risch G, Donaldson C, Robichaux MB, Soodyall H, Jenkins T, Sheen F, Swergold G, Stoneking M, Batzer MA. 1999. Interspersed repeat insertion polymorphisms for studies of human molecular anthropology. In: Genomic Diversity: Applications in Human Population Genetics. S. S. Papiha, R. Deka and R. Chakraborty (Eds.), Plenum Press, New York, NY, pp. 201–212.
- Begovich AB, Klitz W, Steiner LL, Grams S, Suraj-Baker V, Hollenbach J, Trachtenberg E, Louie L, Zimmerman PA, Hill AVS, Stoneking M, Sasazuki T, Rickards O, Titanji VPK, Konenkov VI, Sartakova ML. 2000. HLA-DQ haplotypes in 15 different populations. In: The Major Histocompatibility Complex: Evolution, Structure and Function. M Kasahara (Ed.), Springer, New York, NY, pp. 412–426.
- Stoneking M, Deininger PL, Batzer MA. 2001. Alu insertion polymorphisms in humans: a review. In: Genes, Fossils and Behaviour. P. Donnelly and R. Foley (eds.), IOS Press, Amsterdam, the Netherlands, pp. 111–121.
- Nasidze I, Stoneking M. 2002. Genetic variation among human populations from the Caucasus. In: The First Workshop on Information Technologies Application to Problems of Biodiversity and Dynamics. V.K.Shumny, N.A.Kolchanov, and A.M.Fedotov (Eds.), Russian Academy of Sciences, Novosibirsk, Russia, pp. 272–278.
- Stoneking M. 2005. Gene, geographie und Sprache. In: Gene, Sprachen und ihre Evolution. G. Hauska (ed.), Universitätsverlag Regensburg GmbH, Regensburg, Germany, pp. 133–140.
- Stoneking M. 2006. Investigating the health of our ancestors: insights from the evolutionary genetic consequences of prehistoric diseases. In: Integrative Approaches to Human Health and Evolution. T.G. Bromage, A. Vidal, E. Aguirre and A. Perez-Ochoa (eds.), Elsevier B. V., Amsterdam, pp. 106–114.
- Nasidze I, Stoneking M. 2006. Mother tongue: Concomitant replacement of language and mtDNA in South Caspian populations of Iran. In: The Evolution of Language. A. Cangelosi, A.D.M. Smith and K. Smith (eds.), World Scientific Co. Pte. Ltd., New Jersey, pp. 432–433. ISBN 978-9812566560
- Stoneking M, Kayser M. 2007. Genealogical markers: mtDNA and the Y-chromosome. In: Genetic Variation: A Laboratory Manual. M. P. Weiner, S. B. Gabriel, J.C. Stephens (eds.), Cold Spring Harbor Laboratory Press, New York, pp. 421–436. ISBN 978-0879697808
- Nasidze I, Stoneking M. 2011. Microbiome diversity in human saliva. In: Handbook of Microbial Ecology, Volume II: Metagenomics in Different Habitats. F J. de Bruijn (ed.), Wiley-Blackwell, Hoboken, New Jersey, pp. 335–339. ISBN 978-0470647196
