= Pedigree collapse =

Concept in genealogy

In genealogy, pedigree collapse describes how reproduction between two individuals who share an ancestor causes the number of distinct ancestors in the family tree of their offspring to be smaller than it could otherwise be. Robert C. Gunderson coined the term; synonyms include implex and the German Ahnenschwund ("loss of ancestors").

== Overview ==
Without pedigree collapse, a person's ancestor tree is a binary tree, formed by the person, the parents (2), the grandparents (4), great-grandparents (8), and so on. However, the number of individuals in such a tree grows exponentially and will eventually become impossibly high. For example, a single individual alive today would, over 30 generations going back to the High Middle Ages, have 2^{30} or roughly 1 billion ancestors, more than the total world population at the time.

This paradox is explained by shared ancestors. Instead of consisting of all different individuals, a tree may have multiple places occupied by a single individual. This typically happens when the parents of an ancestor are related to each other (sometimes unbeknownst to themselves). For example, the offspring of two first cousins has at most only six great-grandparents instead of the usual eight (four for each one). This reduction in the number of ancestors is referred to as pedigree collapse. It collapses the ancestor tree into a directed acyclic graph.

In some cultures, cousins and other relations were permitted, encouraged, or required to marry. This may have been to keep kin bonds, wealth and property within a family (endogamy) or simply because there was a limited number of potential marriage partners available. Among royalty, the frequent requirement to marry only other royals resulted in a reduced gene pool in which most individuals were the result of extensive pedigree collapse. Alfonso XII of Spain, for example, had only four great-grandparents instead of the usual eight. Furthermore, two of these great-grandparents, Charles IV of Spain and Maria Luisa of Parma, who themselves were first cousins, were parents of another great-grandparent, Maria Isabella of Spain. Essentially, Alfonso's parents were double first cousins, i.e. his two grandfathers were brothers and his two grandmothers were sisters, meaning there were only two sets of great-grandparents rather than four. In addition, each grandfather had married one of their sister's daughters, i.e. they had each married their sororal niece.

More generally, in many cultures intermarriage may frequently occur within a small village, limiting the available gene pool.

Pedigree of Alfonso XII of Spain

Louise Élisabeth of France | Philip; Duke of Parma | Charles III of Spain | Maria Amalia of Saxony | Francis I Holy Roman Emperor | Maria Theresa of Austria
Maria Luisa of Parma | Charles IV of Spain | Ferdinand I of the Two Sicilies | Maria Carolina of Austria
Ferdinand VII of Spain | María Isabella of Spain | Francis I of the Two Sicilies | Francisco de Paula of Spain
Maria Christina of the Two Sicilies | Luisa Carlotta of the Two Sicilies
Isabella II of Spain | Francis; Duke of Cádiz
Alfonso XII of Spain

Pedigree of Ferdinand I of Austria

Leopold; Duke of Lorraine | Élisabeth Charlotte d'Orléans
Francis I Holy Roman Emperor
Leopold II; Holy Roman Emperor

Charles VI; Holy Roman Emperor | Elisabeth Christine of Brunswick-Wolfenbüttel | Philip V of Spain | Elisabeth Farnese
Maria Theresa of Austria | Charles III of Spain
Maria Carolina of Austria | Ferdinand I of the Two Sicilies
Francis II; Holy Roman Emperor (Francis I of Austria) | Maria Theresa of the Two Sicilies
Ferdinand I of Austria

Augustus III of Poland | Maria Josepha of Austria
Maria Amalia of Saxony
Maria Luisa of Spain

Pedigree of Cleopatra VII of Egypt (disputed)

Ptolemy V Epiphanes | Cleopatra I
Ptolemy VI Philometor | Cleopatra II
Ptolemy VIII Physcon | Cleopatra III
Cleopatra II Selene | Ptolemy IX Lathyros | Cleopatra IV
Ptolemy X Alexander I | Berenice III
Cleopatra V | Ptolemy XII Auletes
Cleopatra VII

== Ancestry ==
The House of Habsburg gives a well-documented example of pedigree collapse. In the case of Charles II, the last Habsburg King of Spain, there were three uncle-niece marriages among the seven unions of his immediate ancestry (i.e. parents, grandparents and great-grandparents). His father and two of his great-grandfathers married their nieces. His paternal grandparents were first cousins once removed, but they comprised two of the seven marriages because they were also parents to his maternal grandmother. His maternal grandparents' marriage and the final marriage of great-grandparents was between first cousins.

Ancestors of Charles II of Spain
Thick red borders indicate children of consanguinity, where parents were at least second cousins.

Philip I King of Castile (Note: Charles V, Holy Roman Emperor at the Encyclopædia Britannica); 1478–1506 | Joanna; Queen of Castile and Aragon; 1479–1555
Isabella of Portugal; 1503–1539 | Charles V Holy Roman Emperor; 1500–1558 | Ferdinand I Holy Roman Emperor (Note: Press, Volker (1990). "Maximilian II.". Neue Deutsche Biographie (in German). Vol. 16. Berlin: Duncker & Humblot. pp. 471–475. (full text online).); 1503–1564 | Anna of Bohemia and Hungary; 1503–1547 | Isabella of Austria; 1501–1526 | Christian II; King of Denmark; 1481–1559
Maria of Austria; 1528–1603 | Maximilian II; Holy Roman Emperor; 1527–1576 | Anna of Austria; 1528–1590 | Albert V Duke of Bavaria; 1528–1579 | Christina of Denmark; 1522–1590 | Francis I Duke of Lorraine; 1517–1545
Philip II; King of Spain; 1527–1598 | Anna of Austria; 1549–1580 | Charles II; Archduke of Austria (Note: Eder, Karl (1961). "Ferdinand II.". Neue Deutsche Biographie (in German). Vol. 5. Berlin: Duncker & Humblot. pp. 83–85. (full text online).); 1540–1590 | Maria Anna of Bavaria; 1551–1608 | William V Duke of Bavaria; 1548–1626 | Renata of Lorraine; 1544–1602
Philip III; King of Spain; 1578–1621 | Margaret of Austria; 1584–1611 | Ferdinand II; Holy Roman Emperor; 1578–1637 | Maria Anna of Bavaria; 1574–1616
Maria Anna of Spain; 1606–1646 | Ferdinand III; Holy Roman Emperor; 1608–1657
Philip IV; King of Spain; 1605–1665 | Mariana of Austria; 1634–1696
Charles II; King of Spain; 1661–1700

Notes:

The maximum pedigree collapse of 50% within a single generation is caused by procreation between full siblings; such children have only two different grandparents instead of the usual four. If two half-siblings procreate, their children have three grandparents instead of four (25%).

If a child and parent were to procreate, their offspring would have four grandparents; so, procreation between parents and children would result in less pedigree collapse than procreation between full siblings – although one of the grandparents would also be a parent and therefore introduce no additional genes.

If a person procreates with a full sibling of one of their parents (as with the uncle-niece marriages mentioned above), the offspring have four different persons as grandparents, and eight great-grandparents, but again some of these contribute no additional genes (see Inbreeding).

Small, isolated populations such as those of remote islands represent extreme examples of pedigree collapse, but the common historical tendency to marry those within walking distance, due to the relative immobility of the population before modern transport, meant that most marriage partners were at least distantly related. Even in America around the 19th century, the tendency of immigrants to marry among their ethnic, language or cultural group produced many cousin marriages.

If one considers as a function of time t the number of a given individual's ancestors who were alive at time t, it is likely that for most individuals this function has a maximum at around 1200 AD. It was suggested in 1985 that everyone on Earth is at most 50th cousin to everyone else, based on a relatively random mating model. Simulations published in 2004 which take into account the geographical separations and less random patterns of mating in real life suggest that some populations are separated by up to a few thousand years, with a most recent common ancestor perhaps 76 generations back, though some highly remote populations may have been isolated for somewhat longer.

== See also ==
- Coefficient of relationship
- Consanguinity
- Cousin marriage
- Galton–Watson process
- Haplotype
- Identical ancestors point
- I'm My Own Grandpa
- Inbreeding
- Most recent common ancestor
- The Seven Daughters of Eve
