= List of DNA-tested mummies =

This is a purported list of ancient humans remains, including mummies, that may have been DNA tested. Provided as evidence of the testing are links to the mitochondrial DNA sequences, and/or to the human haplogroups to which each case has been assigned. Also provided is a brief description of when and where they lived. Entries lacking a citation should be viewed with skepticism; in particular, cases with no sequence or haplogroup links, with citation, have no evidentiary basis for appearing.

== mtDNA and YDNA tests ==
The following mummies have undergone mtDNA (mitochondrial DNA) and YDNA tests, of remains with the indicated name, from the indicated locations:

Name	Original Location of Remains	Date Lived (years ago)	Mitochondrial DNA sequence	mtDNA Haplogroup	Y-DNA Haplogroup
Paglicci 23	Italy	28,000	CRS	H	
Paglicci 25	Italy	24,000	7,025 AluI, 00073A, 11719G, 12308A	HV	
TAF009 TAF010 TAF011 TAF012 TAF013 TAF014 TAF015	Morocco	15,100-13,900 15,100-13,900 15,100-13,900 15,100-13,900 15,100-13,900 15,100-13,900 15,100-13,900		U6a6b U6a7b U6a7 U6a7 U6a7b M1b U6a1b	E1b1b1a1 E1b1b1a1 E1b1b1a1 N/A E1b1b1a1 E1b1b1a1 E1b1b1a1
Cheddar Man	England	10,300	16192T, 16270T	U5b1	I2-L38 (I2a2)
Ötzi the Iceman	Austria/Italy	5,300-5,240		K	G2a2b
Old Kingdom individual (NUE001)	Egypt	4,880-4,600		I/N1a1b2	E1b1b1b2b~
Djehutynakht (10A)	Egypt	3,986-4,040		U5b2b5	
Nakht-Ankh	Egypt	3,800		M1a1	
Khnum-Nakht	Egypt	3,800		M1a1	
Queen Tiye	Egypt	3,423-3,363		K	
JK2887	Egypt	3,413-3,336		J2a1a1	N/A
Tutankhamun	Egypt	3,366-3,348		K	R1b
Tel Shadud Canaanite Nobelman	Israel	3,300			R1b
Tel Shadud specimen L126	Israel	3,300		Haplogroup I5a1	J
Ramesses III	Egypt	3,242-3,180			E1b1a
Pentawer	Egypt	3,198-3,180			E1b1a
Egyptian Mummy 2516	Egypt	2,823-2,616			T-FT222060
JK2134	Egypt	2,801-2,594		J1d	J
JK2911	Egypt	2,794-2,580		M1a1	J
Takabuti	Egypt	2,680		H4a1	
Young Man of Byrsa	Tunisia	late 6th century BCE		U5b2c1	
OM:KMM A 64 YM:KMM A 63	Egypt	2,186-2,299 2,117-2,108		T2c1a HV	
JK2888	Egypt	2,122-2,027		U6a2	E1b1b1a1b2
The Norwich Anglo-Saxon	England	1,000	16189A, 16223T, 16271C, 16278T	X	
Juanita the Ice Maiden	Peru	500	16111T, 16223T, 16290T, 16319A	A	
500-year-old Inca child	Argentina	500		C1b	

== DNA tests ==
The following mummies have undergone DNA tests, of remains with the indicated name, from the indicated locations:

Name	Original Location of Remains	Date Lived (years ago)	DNA sequence	Y-DNA Haplogroup
Thuya	Egypt	3,390	D13S317, D7S820, D2S1338, D21S11, D16S539, D18S51, CSF1PO, FGA	
Yuya	Egypt	3,390	D13S317, D7S820, D2S1338, D21S11, D16S539, D18S51, CSF1PO, FGA	
KV35 Younger Lady	Egypt	3,390	D13S317, D7S820, D2S1338, D21S11, D16S539, D18S51, CSF1PO, FGA	
Tiye (Elder Lady KV35)	Egypt	3,370	D13S317, D7S820, D2S1338, D21S11, D16S539, D18S51, CSF1PO, FGA	
Amenhotep III	Egypt	3,370	D13S317, D7S820, D2S1338, D21S11, D16S539, D18S51, CSF1PO, FGA	
KV55 mummy	Egypt	3,350	D13S317, D7S820, D2S1338, D21S11, D16S539, D18S51, CSF1PO, FGA	
Tutankhamun	Egypt	3,340	D13S317, D7S820, D2S1338, D21S11, D16S539, D18S51, CSF1PO, FGA	
KV21 Mummy A	Egypt	3,340	D13S317, D2S1338, D21S11, D16S539, D18S51, CSF1PO, FGA	
KV21 Mummy B	Egypt	3,340	D13S317, D2S1338, D16S539, CSF1PO	
KV62 Fetus 1	Egypt	3,340	D13S317, D7S820, D2S1338, D21S11, D16S539, D18S51, CSF1PO, FGA	
KV62 Fetus 2	Egypt	3,340	D13S317, D7S820, D2S1338, D21S11, D16S539, D18S51, CSF1PO, FGA	

== See also ==
- Ancient DNA
- Cambridge Reference Sequence
- Human mitochondrial DNA haplogroup
- List of genetic results derived from historical figures
- List of mummies
