= Paglicci 23 =

Hominin fossil

Paglicci 23 is the name for human remains found in Paglicci Cave in Apulia, Italy that have been dated to 28,000 years Before Present.

In 2008 a scientific team led by David Caramelli tested Paglicci 23 and found that mtDNA sequences corresponding to positions 16024-16383 were identical to the Cambridge Reference Sequence. The result was exhaustively tested for possible contamination and replicated in a separate test. The paper does not assign any mtDNA haplogroup to the results as the mtDNA segment is too small to draw any conclusions in this regard. Many haplogroups, however, are defined by mutations in this segment as indicated in the table below.

Haplogroup	Position of defining mutation
JT	16126
U1	16249
U2	16051, 16129C
U3	16343
U4	16356
U5	16270
U6	16172, 16219
U7	16318,T
K	16224, 16311
B	16189, 16217
F	16304

As a result, the sample can confirm that the mtDNA does not correspond to any of the above modern extant haplogroups. The sample is however confirmed to belong to haplogroup R: 16263 is a critical marker for haplogroup R. The sample does not rule out nor confirm that the sample may belong to haplogroup H as this group is distinguished from haplogroup R by mutations at position 73 which has not been replicated in this study. The haplogroup R node and the CRS sequence are distinguished by various mutations outside the sequenced region.

== See also ==
- List of DNA tested mummies
- Ancient DNA
