= Paglicci Cave =

Cave and archaeological site in Italy

Grotta Paglicci (Paglicci Cave)
- Location within Italy
- Location: Rignano Garganico (FG, Apulia, Italy)
- Coordinates: 41°40′00″N 15°34′00″E
- Elevation: 590 m
- Geology: Karst cave
- Entrances: 1
- Access: Public
- Website: Official website

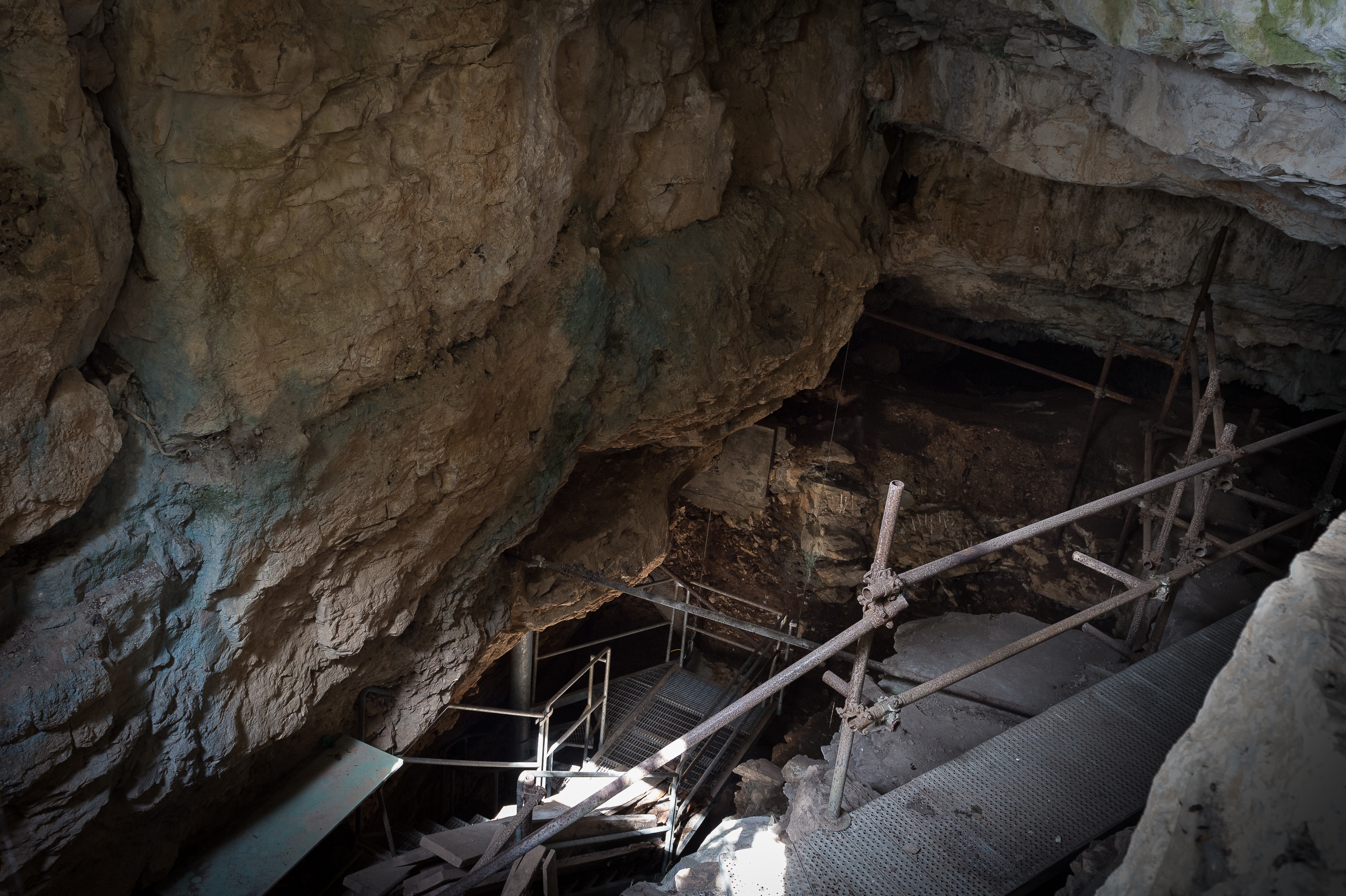
Grotta Paglicci 1.jpg

Paglicci Cave is an archaeological site situated in Paglicci, near Rignano Garganico, Apulia, southern Italy. The cave, discovered in the 1950s, is the most important cave of Gargano. The cave is an attraction of the Gargano National Park.

== Description ==
In the cave, situated near Rignano Garganico, there are more than 45,000 individual finds, including Paleolithic tools, human and animal bones. They are currently housed in Rignano Garganico's Museum. Evidence of Paleolithic oat harvesting dating to 30,600 BC was linked to a pestle recovered from the cave.

The cave contains also some Paleolithic mural paintings, depicting horses and handprints. Images of goats, cows, a serpent, a nest with eggs, and a hunting scene have also been found engraved on bone.

Two human skeletons have been found as well, belonging to a boy and a young woman, both wearing deer bone or teeth ornaments.

Paglicci cave contains the earliest Aurignacian and Gravettian remains of Italy, dated to c. 34,000 and 28,000 BP (uncalibrated).

== Risk of collapse ==
In 2008 Italian archaeologists made a plea to the Prime Minister, Silvio Berlusconi, to dedicate funds to save the cave which is at risk of imminent collapse.

== Relevance in population genetics ==
Caramelli et al. (2008) tested human remains from Paglicci 23 dated 28,000 BP (before present), and found that the individual had the human mitochondrial haplogroup H, specifically the rather common Cambridge Reference Sequence. The result was exhaustively tested for possible contamination and replicated in a separate test.

Fu et al. (2016) found that 31-35 thousand years old human remains from Paglicci 133 carried Y-DNA haplogroup I (not I1) (CTS674+, CTS9269+) and mtDNA haplogroup U8c.

== See also ==
- List of caves in Italy
- Prehistoric archaeological sites in Italy
