= Norwich Anglo-Saxon =

Ancient human remains found in England

Coordinates: 52.629729°N 1.29776°E

The Norwich Anglo-Saxon is an ancient preserved skeleton of the age of around one thousand years, found in Norwich, England. It is a topic of study and interest in regard to the genetic composition of people of that region.

== See also ==
- List of DNA-tested mummies
