= Haplogroup H (mtDNA) =

Human mitochondrial DNA haplogroup

- Possible time of origin: 20,000–25,000 YBP
- Possible place of origin: Middle East
- Ancestor: HV
- Descendants: H* lineages; subclades H1, H2, H3, H4, H5'36, H6, H7, H8, H9, H10, H11, H12, H13, H14, H15, H16, H18, H19, H20, H22, H23, H24, H25, H26, H28, H29, H31, H32, H33, H34, H35, H37, H38, H39, 16129(H17+H27), 16129(H21+H30) (numbers to H144)
- Defining mutations: G2706A, T7028C

Haplogroup H is a human mitochondrial DNA (mtDNA) haplogroup. The clade was believed to have originated in West Asia, near present-day Syria, around 20,000 to 25,000 years ago. However, a specimen has been found in South Italy from 28,000 years ago, in Paglicci Cave. Mitochondrial haplogroup H is today predominantly found in Europe, and is believed to have evolved before the Last Glacial Maximum (LGM). It first expanded in the northern Near East and Southern Caucasus, and later migrations from Iberia suggest that the clade reached Europe before the Last Glacial Maximum. The haplogroup has also spread from West Asia to parts of Africa, Siberia and Inner Asia. Today, around 40% of all maternal lineages in Europe belong to haplogroup H.

== Origin ==
Haplogroup H is a descendant of haplogroup HV. The Cambridge Reference Sequence (CRS), which until recently was the human mitochondrial sequence to which all others were compared, belongs to haplogroup H2a2a1. Several independent studies conclude that haplogroup H probably evolved in Western Asia c. 25,000 years ago.

In July 2008 ancient mtDNA from an individual called Paglicci 23, whose remains were dated to 28,000 years ago and excavated from Paglicci Cave (Apulia, Italy), were found to be identical to the Cambridge Reference Sequence in HVR1. This once was believed to indicate haplogroup H, but researchers now recognize that CRS HVR1 also appears in U or HV, because there are no HVR1 mutations that separate CRS from the haplogroup R founder. Haplogroup HV derives from the haplogroup R0, which in turn derives from haplogroup R, which is a descendant of macro-haplogroup N, which like its sibling M is a descendant of haplogroup L3.

MtDNA H had frequency of 19% among Neolithic Early European Farmers and virtually absent among Mesolithic European hunter gatherers.

MtDNA H was also present in the Cucuteni–Trypillia culture.

The clade has been observed among ancient Egyptian mummies excavated at the Abusir el-Meleq archaeological site in Middle Egypt, which date from the pre-Ptolemaic/late New Kingdom and Ptolemaic periods.

Additionally, haplogroup H has been found among specimens at the mainland cemetery in Kulubnarti, Sudan, which date from the Early Christian period (AD 550–800).

== Distribution ==
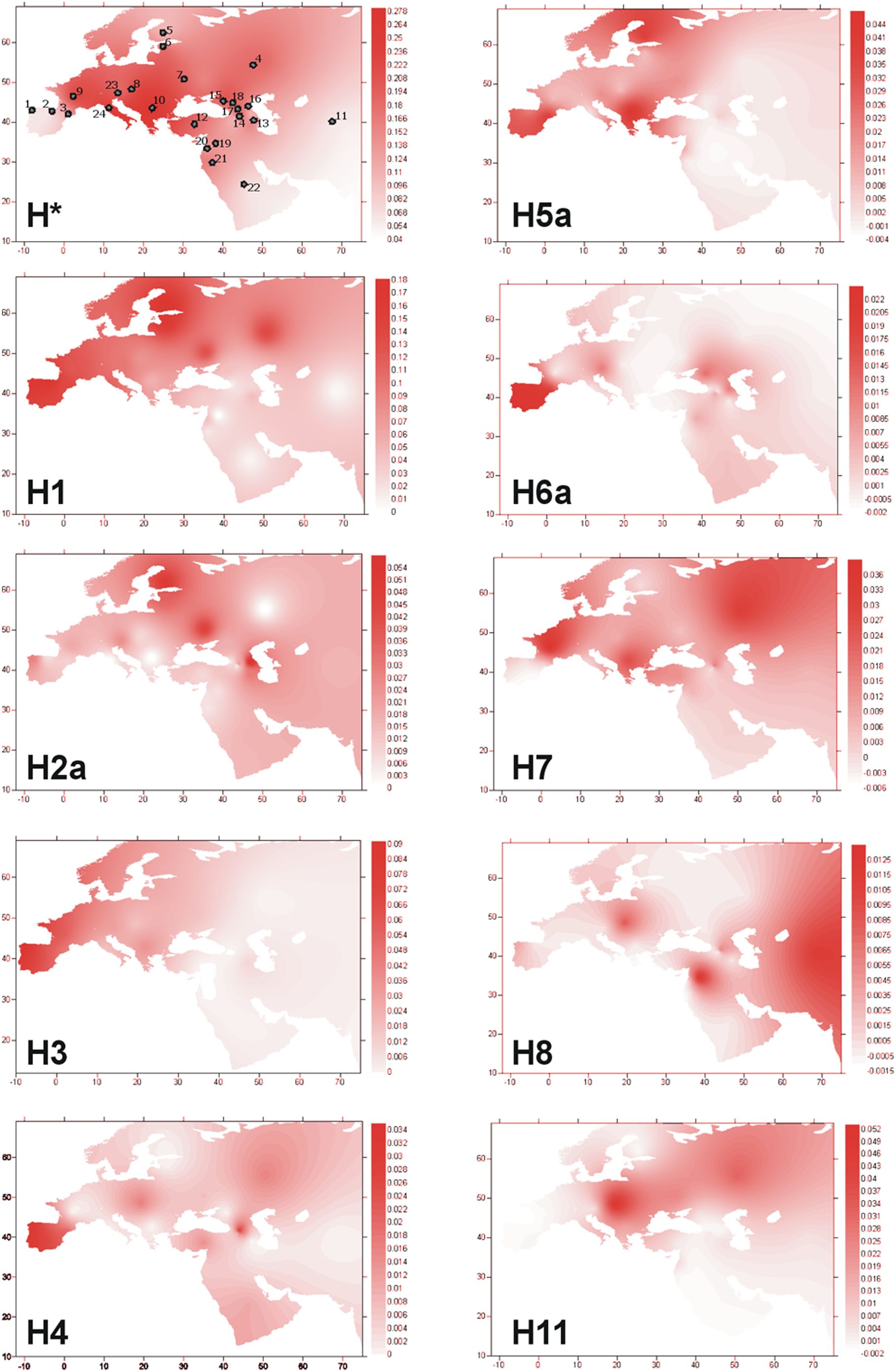
Projected spatial frequency distributions for haplogroups H*, H1, H2a, H3, H4, H5a, H6a, H7, H8 and H11

Haplogroup H is the most common mtDNA clade in Europe. It is found in approximately 41% of native Europeans. The lineage is also common in North Africa and the Middle East.

The majority of the European populations have an overall haplogroup H frequency of 40–50%, with frequencies decreasing in the southeast. The clade reaches 20% in the Near East and Caucasus, 17% in Iran, and <10% in the Arabian Peninsula, Northern India and Central Asia.

Undifferentiated haplogroup H has been found among Palestinians (14%), Syrians (13.6%), Druze (10.6%), Iraqis (9.5%), Somalis (6.7%), Egyptians (5.7% in El-Hayez; 14.7% in Gurna), Saudis (5.3–10%), Soqotri (3.1%), Nubians (1.3%), and Yemenis (0–13.9%).

== Subclades ==
Among all these clades, the subhaplogroups H1 and H3 have been subject to a more detailed study and would be associated to the Magdalenian expansion from SW Europe c. 13,000 years ago:

=== H1 ===
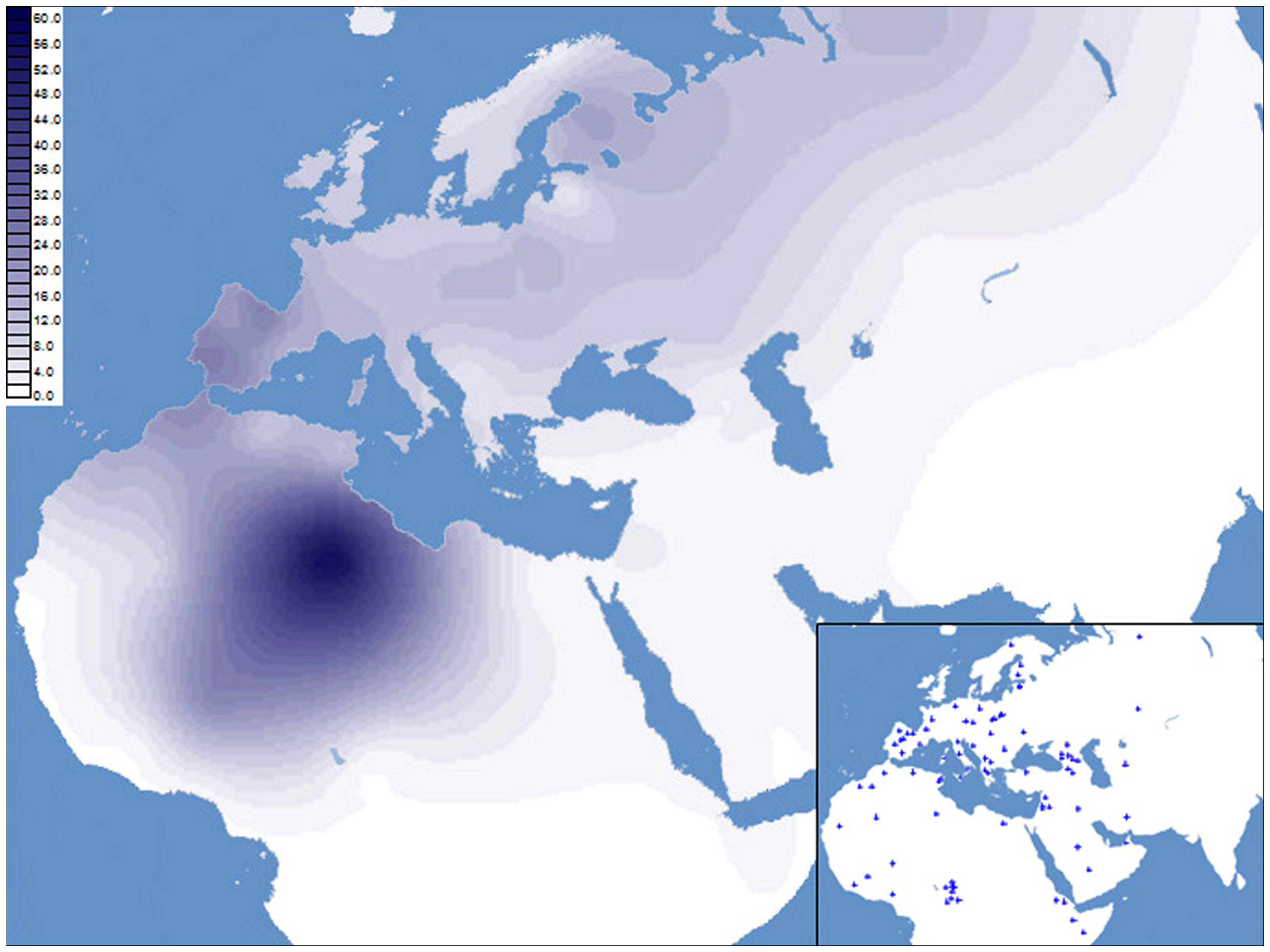
Projected spatial frequency distribution of haplogroup H1

H1 encompasses an important fraction of Western European mtDNA lineages, reaching its local peak among contemporary Basques (27.8%). The clade also occurs at high frequencies elsewhere in the Iberian Peninsula, as well as in the Maghreb (Tamazgha). The haplogroup frequency is above 10% in many other parts of Europe (France, Sardinia, parts of the British Isles, Alps, large portions of Eastern Europe), and surpasses 5% in nearly all of the continent. Its H1b subclade is most common in eastern Europe and NW Siberia.

As of 2010, the highest frequency of the H1 subclade has been found among the Tuareg inhabiting the Fezzan region in Libya (61%). The basal H1* haplogroup is found among the Tuareg inhabiting the Gossi area in Mali (4.76%).

The rare H1cb subclade is concentrated among Fulani groups inhabiting the Sahel.

Haplogroup H has been found in various fossils that were analysed for ancient DNA, including specimens associated with the Linearbandkeramik culture (H1e, Halberstadt-Sonntagsfeld, 1/22 or ~5%; H1 or H1au1b, Karsdorf, 1/2 or 50%), Germany Middle Neolithic (H1e1a, Esperstedt, 1/1 or 100%), Iberia Early Neolithic (H1, El Prado de Pancorbo, 1/2 or 50%), Iberia Middle Neolithic (H1, La Mina, 1/4 or 25%), and Iberia Chalcolithic (H1t, El Mirador Cave, 1/12 or ~8%). Haplogroup H has been observed in ancient Guanche fossils excavated in Gran Canaria and Tenerife on the Canary Islands, which have been radiocarbon-dated to between the 7th and 11th centuries CE. At the Tenerife site, these clade-bearing individuals were found to belong to the H1cf subclade (1/7; ~14%); at the Gran Canaria site, the specimens carried the H2a subhaplogroup (1/4; 25%). Additionally, ancient Guanche (Bimbaches) individuals excavated in Punta Azul, El Hierro, Canary Islands were all found to belong to the H1 maternal subclade. These locally born individuals were dated to the 10th century and carried the H1-16260 haplotype, which is exclusive to the Canary Islands and Algeria.

Frequencies of haplogroup H1 in the world (Ottoni et al. 2010)

Region or Population	H1%	No. of subjects
Africa		
Libyan Tuareg	61	129
Tuareg (West Sahel)	23.3	90
Berbers (Morocco)	20.2	217
Morocco	12.2	180
Berbers (Tunisia)	13.4	276
Tunisia	10.6	269
Mozabite	9.8	80
Siwas (Egypt)	1.1	184
Western Sahara	14.8	128
Mauritania	6.9	102
Senegal	0	100
Fulani (Chad–Cameroon)	0	186
Cameroon	0	142
Chad	0	77
Buduma (Niger)	0	30
Nigeria	0	69
Ethiopia	0	82
Amhara (Ethiopia)	0	90
Oromo (Ethiopia)	0	117
Sierra Leone	0	155
Guineans (Guiné Bissau)	0	372
Mali	0	83
Kikuyu (Kenya)	0	24
Benin	0	192
Asia		
Central Asia	0.7	445
Pakistan	0	100
Yakuts	1.7	58
Caucasus		
Caucasus (north)	8.8	68
Caucasus (south)	2.3	132
Northwestern Caucasus	4.7	234
Armenians	2.3	175
Daghestan	2.5	269
Georgians	1	193
Karachay-Balkars	4.4	203
Ossetians	2.4	296
Europe		
Andalusia	24.3	103
Basques (Spain)	27.8	108
Catalonia	13.9	101
Galicia	17.7	266
Pasiegos (Cantabria)	23.5	51
Portugal	25.5	499
Spain (miscellaneous)	18.9	132
Italy (north)	11.5	322
Italy (center)	6.3	208
Italy (south)	8.7	206
Sardinia	17.9	106
Sicily	10	90
Finland	18	78
Volga-Ural Finnic speakers	13.6	125
Basques (France)	17.5	40
Béarnaise	14.8	27
France	12.3	106
Estonia	16.7	114
Saami	0	57
Lithuania	1.7	180
Hungary	11.3	303
Czech Republic	10.8	102
Ukraine	9.9	191
Poland	9.3	86
Russia	13.5	312
Austria	10.6	2487
Germany	6	100
Romania	9.4	360
Netherlands	8.8	34
Greece (Aegean islands)	1.6	247
Greece (mainland)	6.3	79
North Macedonia	7.1	252
Albania	2.9	105
Turks	3.3	360
Balkans	5.4	111
Croatia	8.3	84
Slovaks	7.6	119
Slovak (East)	16.8	137
Slovak (West)	14.2	70
Middle East		
Arabian Peninsula	0	94
Arabian Peninsula (incl. Yemen, Oman)	0.8	493
Druze	3.4	58
Dubai (United Arab Emirates)	0.4	249
Iraq	1.9	206
Jordanians	1.7	173
Lebanese	4.2	167
Syrians	0	159

=== H3 ===
H3 is found throughout the whole of Europe and in the Maghreb, and is believed to have originated among Mesolithic hunter-gatherers in south-western Europe between 9,000 and 11,000 years ago. H3 represents the second largest fraction of the H genome after H1 and has a somewhat similar distribution, with peaks in Portugal, Spain, Scandinavia and Finland. It is common in Portugal (12%), Sardinia (11%), Galicia (10%), the Basque country (10%), Ireland (6%), Norway (6%), Hungary (6%) and southwestern France (5%). Studies have suggested haplogroup H3 is highly protective against AIDS progression.

Example of H3 sub-groups are:

- H3a and H3g, found in north-west Europe;
- H3b and H3k, found in the British Isles and Catalonia;
- H3c, found in Western Europe, including among the Basques;
- H3h, found throughout northern Europe
- H3i found in Ireland and Scotland;
- H3j found in Italy;
- H3v found especially in Germanic countries and;
- H3z found in Atlantic Europe.

The basal H3* haplogroup is found among the Tuareg inhabiting the Gossi area in Mali (4.76%).

=== H5 ===
H5 may have evolved in West Asia, where it is most frequent and diverse in the Western Caucasus. However, its H5a subclade has a stronger representation in Europe, though at low levels.

=== H2, H6 and H8 ===
The H2, H6 and H8 haplogroups are somewhat common in Eastern Europe and the Caucasus. They may be the most common H subclades among Central Asians and have also been found in West Asia. H2a5 has been found in the Basque Country, and in Norway, Ireland and Slovakia. H6a1a1a is common among Ashkenazi Jews.

=== H4 ===
H4 is often found in the Iberian Peninsula, Britain and Ireland at levels between 1 and 5% of the population. It is associated with Neolithic migrations.

H4 and H13, along with H2 account for 42% of the hg H lineages in Egypt.

=== H7 ===
The H7 subhaplogroup is present in both Europe and West Asia. Its subclade H7c1 is present in Druze people and in Saudi Arabia. H7c2 is present in such peoples as Ashkenazi Jews, Sardinians, and Dutch people. H7e is present in Ashkenazi Jews, Germans, Sardinians, and others. H7a1b is found today in Scotland, England, Denmark, Finland and Sardinia. H7b1 is found in Lithuanians.

=== H9 ===
H9 is present in Yemenis. The subclade H9a exists in Welsh people, Calabrians and Crimean Karaites. H9a samples were recovered from two ancient people in Lebanon.

=== H10 ===
Haplogroup H10 is subclade which came into existence between 6,300 and 10,900 years ago. Its descendant branches are H10a, H10b, H10c, H10d, H10e, H10f, H10g, and H10h.

Haplogroup H10e has been found at a Neolithic site, namely the Bom Santo cave near Lisbon. This is the oldest sample of H10 which has ever been found and it has been dated to 3735 BCE (±45 years).

=== H11 ===
H11 is commonly found in Central Europe.

=== H12 ===
Italians are notable carriers of H12 and its two branches. H12a has been detected in such regions as Sicily and Calabria.

=== H13 ===
The H13 subhaplogroup is present in both Europe and West Asia. H13 is also found in the Caucasus; H13c was found in a 9,700 year old sample in Mesolithic Georgia and H13a2a and H13a2b are found in Armenians in Armenia. H13a1a2a and H13a1d are present among Lithuanians.

=== H14 ===
The root level of H14 is found in northwestern Europeans, such as in Ireland.

Its subclade H14a is encountered among such populations as Armenians from Turkey, Sardinians from Italy, and Persian Jews and Iraqi Jews. The branch H14a2 is present among Romani people from Spain and Croats and is common in Iran.

Its subclade H14b has a presence in many European and West Asian populations including Assyrian people, Persians and Armenians from Iran, and people in Tuscany (central Italy), Switzerland, Germany, Ireland, Spain, and Qatar. The branch H14b1 is especially prevalent in France but also found in neighboring Monaco and in Scotland and is also found among Lithuanians. The branch H14b3 has been found in Armenians from Artsakh and people from Armenia, Turkey, Saudi Arabia, Italy, and Scotland. H14b4 is in Italy and Germany.

=== H15 ===
H15 includes the base level and the branches H15a and H15b. H15a1b is present in Greeks. H15b is present in Armenians, Druze, Ashkenazi Jews, Danes, and other peoples of Europe and the Near East.

=== H16 ===
H16 is encountered in numerous European populations, such as Norway and England. Its subclade H16a is found in Czechs and in Germany, Scotland, and the Netherlands. H16a1 is similarly found in Europe, including in Denmark. H16b is another common branch and among other places is present in Sardinia. H16c was found in archaeological human remains from Iron Age cemetery in Lejasbitēni, Latvia; it is currently found in Sweden, Great Britain, Lithuania, Poland, Germany, Latvia and elsewhere. H16d is found in Italy, France, Ireland, England, and other parts of Europe. H16e is especially common in Sweden.

In July 2008 ancient mtDNA from an individual called Paglicci 23, whose remains were dated to 28,000 years ago and excavated from Paglicci Cave (Apulia, Italy), were found to be identical to the Cambridge Reference Sequence in HVR1.

=== H17 ===
H17 is especially prevalent in Ireland but also found in England, Scotland, Wales, Sweden, and Germany. H17a is similarly found across Europe, such as in Sardinia and Lithuania.

=== H18 ===
H18 occurs on the Arabian Peninsula.

=== H20 and H21 ===
These haplogroups are both found in the Caucasus region. H20 also appears at low levels in the Iberian Peninsula (less than 1%), Arabian Peninsula (1%) and Near East (2%).

=== H22 through H95a ===
These subclades are found mostly in Europe, South-West Asia and Central Asia.

H24 is found in Romance-speaking countries' populations (France, Spain, and Romani people from Spain) as well as in Germany, Ireland, Scotland, and England.

H45 is found in Ireland and Spain. Its subclade H45a is especially found in Finland but also found in Sweden. H45b exists among multiple kinds of western Europeans, including people in Ireland, Scotland, England, and Germany.

H47 has been found in Syria, Italy, and Armenians and infrequently in Ashkenazi Jews. Its subclade H47a is exclusively European, being found in such countries as England, Ireland, Czechia, and Bulgaria.

H53 is encountered in such countries as Spain (including among Basques) and Poland and as far east as Xinjiang in western China (among Uyghurs).

H69 is a European branch found in Finns, Irish people, and inhabitants of Sweden, Germany, and Switzerland.

H91a is associated with the Uyghur ethnic minority of western China.

=== H96 and above ===
These were the most recently discovered and named major branches of H.

H105 is found in Italy and Hungary.

H106 is found in Italy, France, Austria, England, and Germany.

H107 is encountered in Russia.

H176 is a rare branch estimated to have formed around 8100 BCE. Based on the earliest known maternal origins currently reported for sampled descendants (Italy, Greece, and Turkey), a likely point of origin is in or near Anatolia (modern-day Turkey) or the eastern Mediterranean. H176's estimated age overlaps with the Neolithic of West Asia, and its hypothesized Anatolian or eastern Mediterranean origin is compatible with the westward movement of early farming populations into Europe via the Aegean and the Balkans. Later population movements during the Bronze Age, including Indo-European migrations from the steppe, reshaped West Eurasian genetic variation and may have contributed to the dispersal of rare maternal lineages where they were present.

== Tree ==
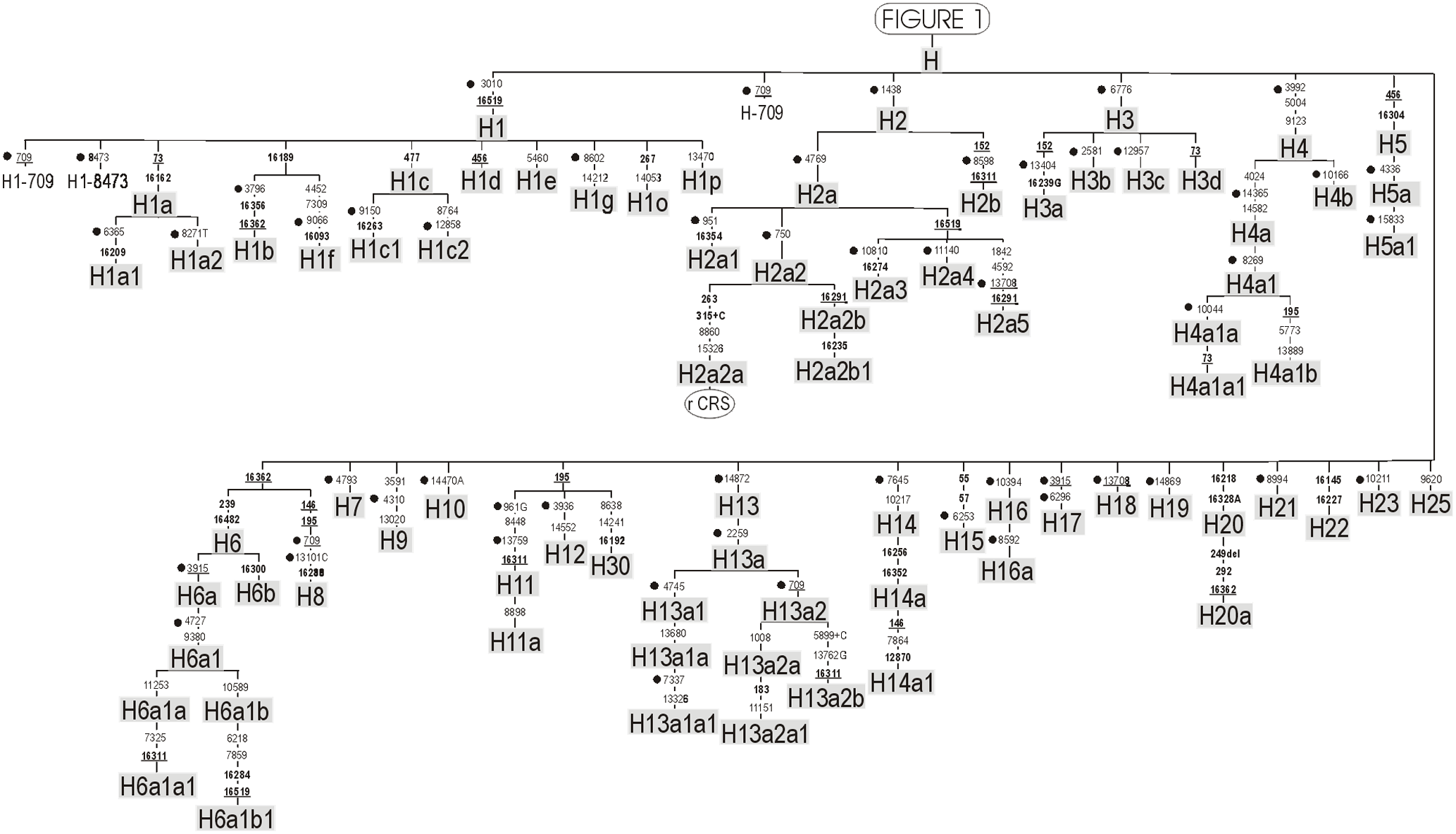
Phylogenetic tree of haplogroup H

This phylogenetic tree of haplogroup H subclades is based on Build 17 (February 2016) of the Phylotree, an internationally accepted standard. The full tree can be viewed at Phylotree.

mtDNA HG "H" p-tree
- HV
  - H
    - H1
    - H2
    - H3
    - H4
    - H5'36
    - H6
    - H7
    - (T195C!)
      - (T146C!)
        - H8
        - H31
      - H11
      - H12
      - H91
      - H108
    - (T152C!)
      - H9
      - H32
      - H46
      - H52
      - H53
      - H69
      - H103
      - H107
    - H10
    - H13
    - H14
    - H15
    - H16
    - H-G16129A!
      - H17
      - H27
    - H18
    - H20
    - H21
    - H22
    - H23
    - H24
    - H25
    - H26
    - H28
    - H29
    - H30
    - H33
    - (C16291T)
      - H34
      - H64
      - H85
    - H35
    - H39
    - H40
    - H41
    - H42
    - H43
    - H44
    - H45
    - H47
    - H48
    - H49
    - H50
    - H51
    - H53
    - H54
    - H55
    - H56
    - H57
    - H58
    - H59
    - H60
    - H61
    - H62
    - H63
    - H65
    - H66
    - H67
    - H70
    - H71
    - H72
    - H73
    - H74
    - H75
    - H76
    - H77
    - H78
    - H79
    - H80
    - H81
    - H82
    - H83
    - H84
    - H86
    - H87
    - H88
    - H89
    - H90
    - H92
    - H93
    - H94
    - H95
    - H96
    - H100
    - H101
    - H102
    - H104
    - H105
    - H106

== Genetic traits ==
Haplogroup H was found as a possible increased risk factor for ischemic cardiomyopathy development.

== Popular culture ==
- In his popular book The Seven Daughters of Eve, Bryan Sykes named the originator of this mtDNA haplogroup Helena. Stephen Oppenheimer uses the very similar name Helina in his book The Origins of the British.
- Palaeoanthropologist Meave Leakey is a carrier of haplogroup H.
- Professional genealogist Megan Smolenyak carries haplogroup H.
- Commentator David Brooks has a mtDNA haplogroup within H.
- Actress Kyra Sedgwick belongs to haplogroup H1.
- Dr. Mehmet Oz is a member of haplogroup H2a1.
- Actor Kevin Bacon belongs to haplogroup H6.
- Author and journalist A.J. Jacobs belongs to haplogroup H7.
- Actress Mila Kunis belongs to haplogroup H7.
- Politician Bernie Sanders carries haplogroup H11a.
- Marie Antoinette, queen in France, had an H3a mtDNA haplogroup.

== See also ==
- Genealogical DNA test
- Genetic genealogy
- Human mitochondrial genetics
- Population genetics
- SNPedia

Phylogenetic tree of human mitochondrial DNA (mtDNA) haplogroups

Mitochondrial Eve (L)

L0
L1–6

L1
L2

L3

L4
L5
L6
M
N

CZ
D
E
G
Q

O
A
S
R

I
W
X
Y
C
Z
B
F
R0

pre-JT

P

U
HV
JT
K
H
V
J
T
