= Haplogroup K (mtDNA) =

Human mitochondrial DNA haplogroup

- Possible time of origin: 26,700 ± 4,300 years ago
- Possible place of origin: West Asia
- Ancestor: U8b'K
- Descendants: K1, K2
- Defining mutations: 3480 10550 11299 14798 16224 16311

Haplogroup K, formerly Haplogroup UK, is a human mitochondrial DNA (mtDNA) haplogroup. It is defined by the HVR1 mutations 16224C and 16311C. It is now known that K is a subclade of U8.

== Origin ==
Haplogroup K is believed to have originated in the mid-Upper Paleolithic, between about 30,000 and 22,000 years ago. It is the most common subclade of haplogroup U8b.

== Distribution ==
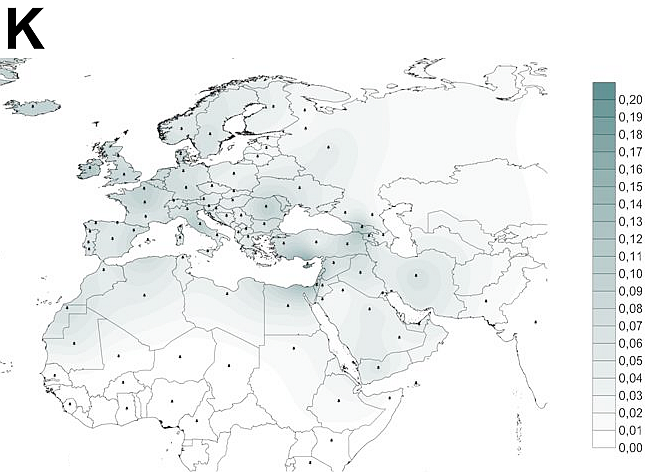
Projected spatial frequency distribution for haplogroup K

Haplogroup K appears in Central Europe, Southern Europe, Northern Europe, North Africa, the Horn of Africa, South Asia and West Asia and in populations with such an ancestry. Overall the mtDNA haplogroup K is found in about 6% of the population of Europe and the Near East, but it is more common in certain populations.

In Europe, K appears to be most common in the Morbihan (17.5%) and Périgord-Limousin (15.3%) regions of France, and in Norway and Bulgaria (13.3%). The level is 12.5% in Belgium, 11% in Georgia and 10% in Austria and Great Britain. Some specific subclades of K among Europeans are K1a1b2b in Finland, K1a3a1 in Sardinia, K1a11 in Lithuanians, K1a19 in Hungary, K1b1b1a in Greeks, K1b1c in Serbia, Slovakia, and Poland, K1c2 in Irish and Germans and in Hungary, and K2a9a in Sardinia. A 2013 study had suggested that K1a1b1a, K1a9, and K2a2a1 could have originated from Western Europe.

Approximately 16% of the Druze of Syria, Lebanon, Israel, and Jordan, belong to haplogroup K. Examples of Druze branches of K are K1a5a and K1a17a. It is also found among 8% of Palestinians. Additionally, K reaches a level of 17% in Kurdistan.

Approximately 32% of people with Ashkenazi Jewish ancestry are in haplogroup K, with about 21% in K1a1b1a alone. This high percentage points to a genetic bottleneck occurring around the years 800-1000 under which K1a1b1a was particularly affected since K1a1b1a carriers' proportions of founder alleles and pathogenic variants were higher than in carriers of other haplogroups, and the K1a1b1a carriers had longer total lengths for runs of homozygosity compared to carriers of other haplogroups. Ashkenazi mtDNA K clusters into six subclades: K1a1b1*, K1a1b1a, K1a4a, K1a9, K2a*, and K2a2a1.

Haplogroup K is also found among Gurage (10%), Syrians (9.1%), Afar (6.3%), Zenata Berbers (4.11%), Reguibate Sahrawi (3.70%), Oromo (3.3%), Iraqis (2.4%), Saudis (0%-10.5%), Yemenis (0%-9.8%), and Algerians (0%-4.3%).

Derenko et al. (2007) found haplogroup K in many samples of Iranic, Turkic, Mongolic, and Tungusic peoples of central Eurasia, including 6.8% (3/44) of a sample of Tajiks, 6.7% (6/90) of a sample of Altai Kizhi, 3.7% (3/82) of a sample of Persians, 2.7% (2/73) of a sample of West Evenks from the Krasnoyarsk region, 2.7% (3/110) of a sample of Kalmyks, 2.1% (1/47) of a sample of Mongolians, 2.0% (2/99) of a sample of Khamnigans, 1.9% (1/53) of a sample of Teleuts, 1.4% (4/295) of a sample of Buryats, and 1.2% (1/82) of a sample of Shors. Min-Sheng Peng et al. found haplogroup K1 in 10.3% (7/68) of a sample of Kyrgyz from Taxkorgan, 7.6% (5/66) of a sample of Wakhi from Taxkorgan, 5.8% (5/86) of a sample of Sarikoli from Taxkorgan, 3.7% (1/27) of a sample of Uyghur from Artux, and 2.0% (1/50) of a sample of Pamiri from Gorno-Badakhshan. In eastern China, mtDNA haplogroup K has been found in 1.3% (1/149 K1a13, 1/149 K2a5) of a sample of Barga Mongols in Hulunbuir and in 0.9% of a sample of Beijing Han.

== Ancient DNA ==
The more ancient evidence of Haplogroup K has been found in the remains of three individuals from Upper Palaeolithic Magdalenian of Spain 11,950 years ago and in the Pre-Pottery Neolithic B site of Tell Ramad, Syria, dating from c. 6000 BC. The clade was also discovered in skeletons of early farmers in Central Europe dated to around 5500–5300 BC, at percentages that were nearly double the percentage present in modern Europe. Some techniques of farming, together with associated plant and animal breeds, spread into Europe from the Near East. The evidence from ancient DNA suggests that the Neolithic culture spread by human migration.

Analysis of the mtDNA of Ötzi, the frozen mummy from 3300 BC found on the Austria–Italy border, has shown that Ötzi belongs to the K1 subclade. It cannot be categorized into any of the three modern branches of that subclade (K1a, K1b or K1c). The new subclade has provisionally been named K1ö for Ötzi. Multiplex assay study was able to confirm that the Iceman's mtDNA belongs to a new European mtDNA clade with a very limited distribution amongst modern data sets.

A woman buried some time between 2650 and 2450 BC in a presumed Amorite tomb at Terqa (Tell Ashara), Middle Euphrates Valley, Syria carried Haplogroup K.

A lock of hair kept at a reliquary at Saint-Maximin-la-Sainte Baume basilica, France, which local tradition holds belonged to the biblical figure Mary Magdalene, was also assigned to haplogroup K. Ancient DNA sequencing of a capillary bulb bore the K1a1b1a subclade and according to the highly controversial researcher Gérard Lucotte, who claims to have discovered the DNA of Jesus Christ, it would indicate that she would have been of Pharisian maternal origin.

Haplogroup K1 has likewise been observed among specimens at the mainland cemetery in Kulubnarti, Sudan, which date from the Early Christian period (AD 550-800).

In 2016, researchers extracted the DNA from the tibia of two individuals separately dated to 7288–6771 BCE and 7605–7529 BCE buried in Theopetra cave, Greece, the oldest known human-made structure, and both individuals were found to belong to mtDNA Haplogroup K1c.

Yuya, a powerful ancient Egyptian courtier during the 18th Dynasty of Egypt (circa 1390 BC) and his wife Thuya, an Egyptian noblewoman associated with the royal family, both belonged to the maternal haplogroup K, as did their descendants:

- Queen Tiye
- Pharaoh Akhenaten
- The Younger Lady (KV35YL)
- Pharaoh Tutankhamun

The remains of 3 Haplogroup K carriers were among ancient Egyptian mummies excavated at the Abusir el-Meleq archaeological site in Middle Egypt as follows beginning with their sample number, followed by clade and date:

- JK2139 K1a AD 54-124
- JK2150 K1a4 BC 650-551
- JK2895 K 16T AD AD 25-111

Fossils excavated at the Late Neolithic site of Kelif el Boroud in Morocco, which have been dated to around 3,000 BCE, have likewise been observed to carry the K1 subclade.

== Subclades ==
=== Tree ===
This phylogenetic tree of haplogroup K subclades is based on the paper by Mannis van Oven and Manfred Kayser Updated comprehensive phylogenetic tree of global human mitochondrial DNA variation and subsequent published research.

mtDNA HG "K" p-tree
- U8b'K
  - U8b
  - K
    - K1
      - K1a
        - K1a1
          - K1a1a
            - K1a1a1
          - K1a1b
            - K1a1b1
              - K1a1b1a
              - K1a1b1b
            - K1a1b2
              - K1a1b2a
        - K1a2
          - K1a2a
            - K1a2a1
            - K1a2a2
          - K1a2b
          - K1a2c
        - K1a3
          - K1a3a
            - K1a3a1
              - K1a3a1a
              - K1a3a1b
          - K1a3k
        - K1a4
          - K1a4a
            - K1a4a1
              - K1a4a1a
              - K1a4a1b
              - K1a4a1c
              - K1a4a1d
              - K1a4a1e
              - K1a4a1f
              - K1a4a1g
          - K1a4b
            - K1a4b1
          - K1a4c
          - K1a4d
        - K1a5
        - K1a6
        - K1a7'8
          - K1a7
          - K1a8
            - K1a8a
        - K1a9
        - K1a10
        - K1a11
        - K1a12
          - K1a12a
        - K1a17
        - K1a18
        - K1a19
        - K1a23
        - K1a27
        - K1a28
        - K1a29
          - K1a29a
      - K1b
        - K1b1
          - K1b1a
            - K1b1a1
          - K1b1b
          - K1b1c
        - K1b2
          - K1b2a
          - K1b2b
      - K1c
        - K1c1
          - K1c1a
          - K1c1b
        - K1c2
      - K1ö
    - K2
      - K2a
        - K2a1
          - K2a1a
        - K2a2
          - K2a2a
            - K2a2a1
        - K2a3
          - K2a3a
            - K2a3a1
        - K2a4
        - K2a5
          - K2a5a
            - K2a5a1
          - K2a5b
        - K2a6
        - K2a7
        - K2a8
        - K2a9
        - K2a10
        - K2a11
      - K2b
        - K2b1
          - K2b1a
      - K2c

== Genetic traits ==
A study involving Caucasian patients showed that individuals classified as haplogroup J or K demonstrated a significant decrease in risk of Parkinson's disease versus individuals carrying the most common haplogroup, H. Additionally, a study from 2020 found that the presence of haplogroup K served as a protective agent against ADHD, with a significant value ($P = 0.0105$). Used in conjunction with haplogroup U, the precursor to haplogroup K, was shown to have an even more significant effect in protecting against ADHD in the participants ($P = 2.46 \times 10 ^{-3}$).

== In popular culture ==
In his popular book The Seven Daughters of Eve, Bryan Sykes named the originator of this mtDNA haplogroup Katrine.

On an 18 November 2005 broadcast of the Today Show, during an interview with Dr. Spencer Wells of The National Geographic Genographic Project, host Katie Couric was revealed to belong to haplogroup K.

On 14 August 2007, Stephen Colbert was told by geneticist Spencer Wells that he is a member of this haplogroup during a segment on The Colbert Report.

Henry Louis Gates Jr. states that Meryl Streep belongs to Haplogroup K in his book Faces of America.

Mayim Bialik belongs to the subclade K1a9, as does Larry David.

Notable carriers of subclade K2a2a have included Steven Pinker, Nadine Epstein, Mike Nichols, and Amy Harmon.

== See also ==
- Genealogical DNA test
- Genetic genealogy
- Haplogroup K1a1b1a (mtDNA)
- Human mitochondrial genetics
- Population genetics
- Human mitochondrial DNA haplogroup

Phylogenetic tree of human mitochondrial DNA (mtDNA) haplogroups

Mitochondrial Eve (L)

L0
L1–6

L1
L2

L3

L4
L5
L6
M
N

CZ
D
E
G
Q

O
A
S
R

I
W
X
Y
C
Z
B
F
R0

pre-JT

P

U
HV
JT
K
H
V
J
T
