= Theopetra Cave =

Archaeological site in Thessaly, Greece

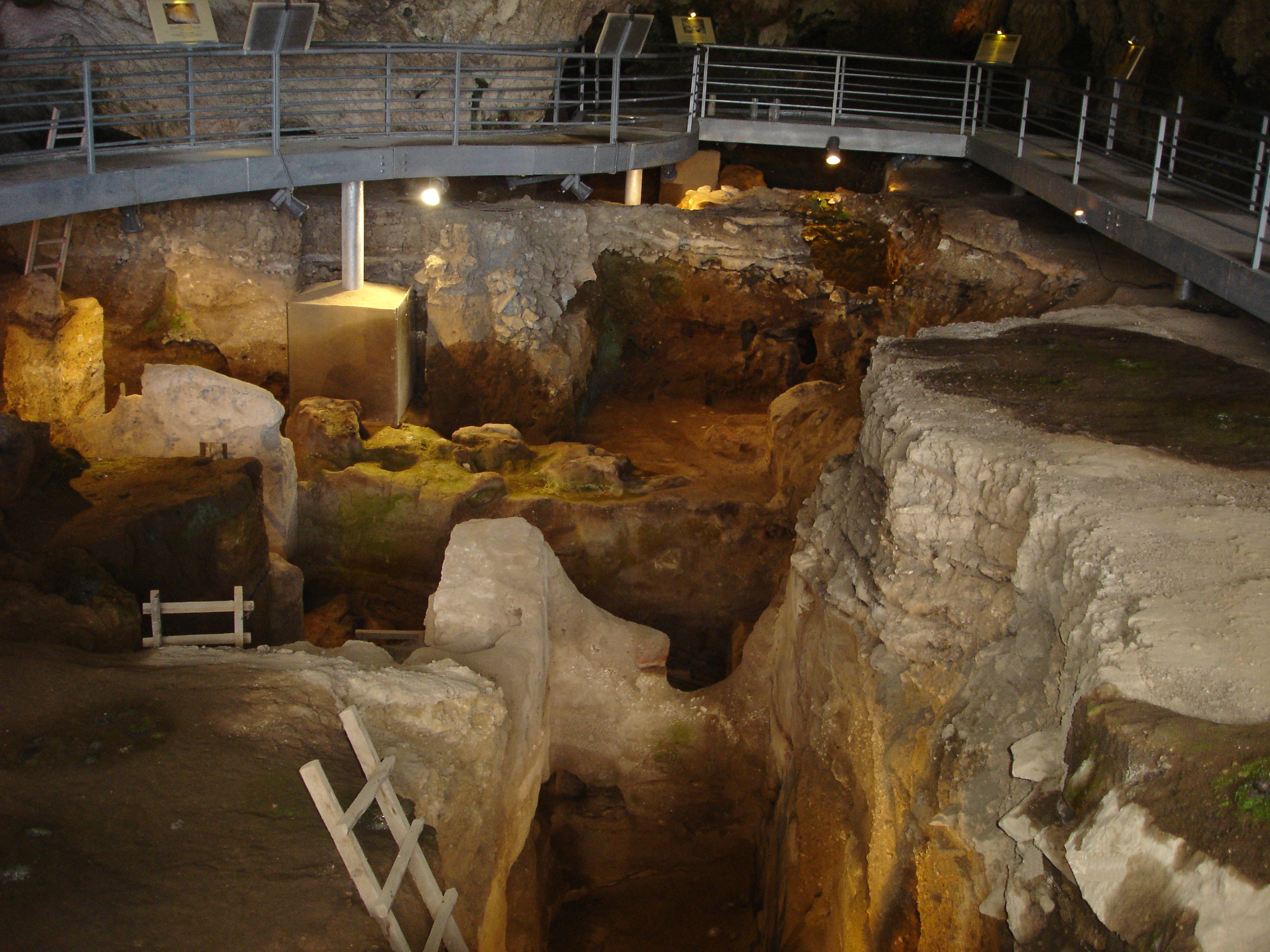
- The interior of the cave

- location in Greece
- 39°40′56.968″N 21°40′54.876″E
- Location: 3 km (2 mi) south of Kalambaka
- Region: Thessaly, Greece

Site notes
- Elevation: 300 m (980 ft)
- Area: 500 m^{2} (5,382 sq ft)
- Excavation dates: 1987–2002, 2005–2008

Theopetra Cave is a limestone cave located in Theopetra village of Meteora municipality, Thessaly, Greece. It is situated on the northeast side of a limestone rock formation that is 3 km (2 mi) south of Kalambaka. The site has become increasingly important as human presence is attributed to all periods of the Middle and Upper Paleolithic, the Mesolithic, Neolithic and beyond, bridging the Pleistocene with the Holocene.

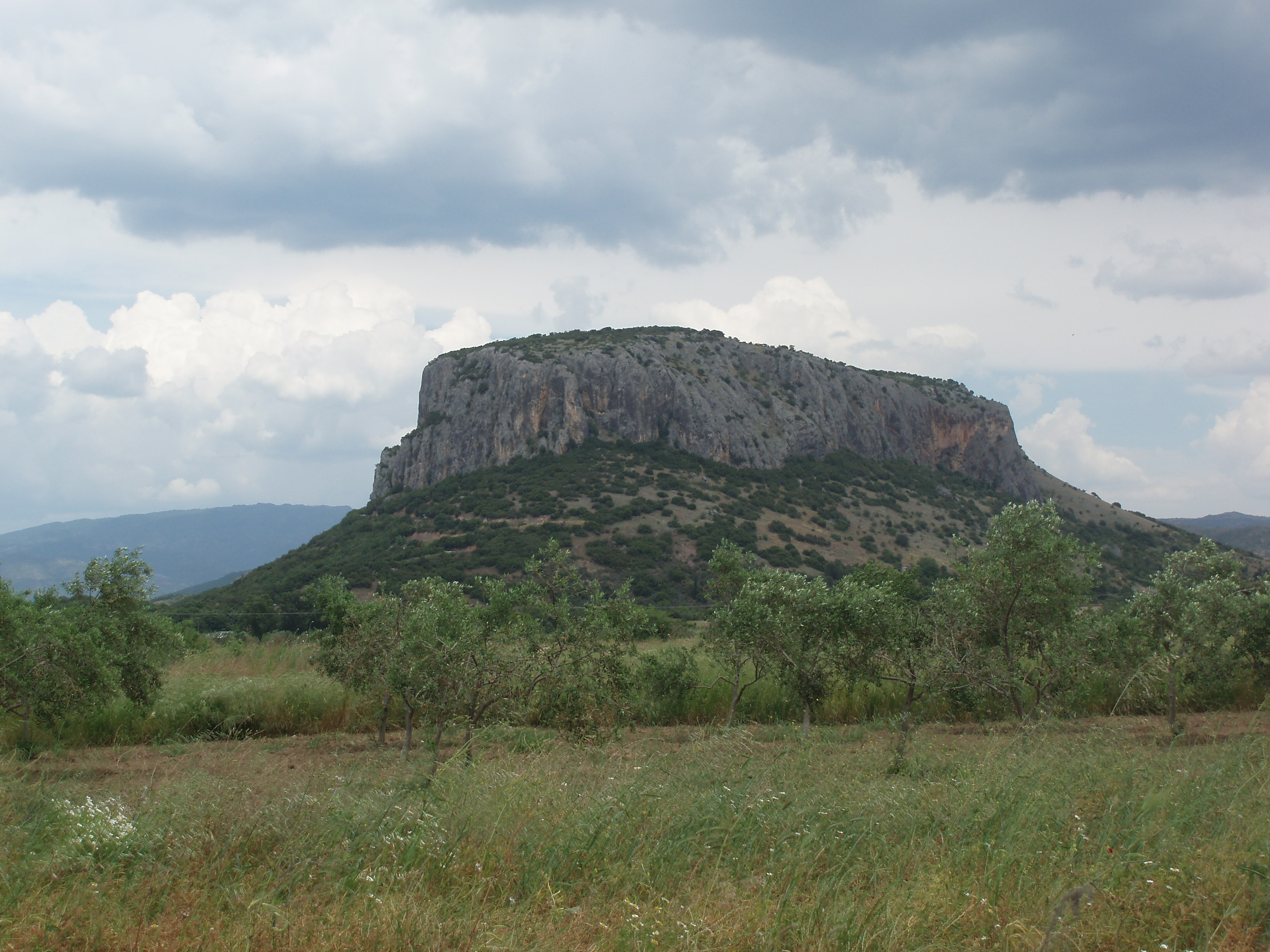
The Theopetra Rock

== Description ==
Radiocarbon evidence shows for human presence at least 50,000 years ago. Excavations began in 1987 under the direction of Ν. Kyparissi-Apostolika, which were meant to answer questions about Paleolithic Thessaly.

Several features of the cave indicate human occupation.

Theopetra Cave contains one of the longest archaeological sequences in Greece, comprising Middle and Upper Palaeolithic as well as Mesolithic and Neolithic cultural remains. The records have shown important palaeoenvironmental data based on sedimentary features and botanical remains.

There are unverified claims that the cave contains a low wall, built in approximately 21,000 BC. If true, this would be the oldest known example of a human-made structure.

Geologically, the formation of the limestone rock has been dated to the Upper Cretaceous period, 135–65 million years BP.

== Archaeogenetics ==
In 2016, researchers successfully extracted the DNA from the tibia of two individuals buried in Theopetra Cave. Both individuals were found in a Mesolithic burial context and separately dated to 7288–6771 BCE and 7605–7529 BCE. Both individuals were found to belong to mtDNA Haplogroup K1c.

== Access ==
The cave is located just to the north, within walking distance, of the center of Theopetra village. The Theopetra Cave Museum (Greek: Μουσείο Σπηλαίου Θεόπετρας) is located in the village.

Nearby, the ruins of the Monastery of St. Theodore (39.663677°N 21.694746°E) are located just to the south of Theopetra village, near the village of Agii Theodori (Άγιοι Θεόδωροι).
