= Haplogroup J (mtDNA) =

Human mitochondrial DNA

- Possible time of origin: 45,000 years before present
- Possible place of origin: West Asia/Middle East
- Ancestor: JT
- Descendants: J1, J2
- Defining mutations: 295 489 10398 12612 13708 16069

Haplogroup J is a human mitochondrial DNA (mtDNA) haplogroup. The clade derives from the haplogroup JT, which also gave rise to haplogroup T. Within the field of medical genetics, certain polymorphisms specific to haplogroup J have been associated with Leber's hereditary optic neuropathy.

== Origin ==
Around 45,000 years before present, a mutation took place in the DNA of a woman who lived in West Asia. Further mutations occurred in the J line, which can be identified as the subclades J1a1, J1c1 (27,000 yrs ago), J2a (19,000 yrs ago), J2b2 (16,000 years ago), and J2b3 (5,800 yrs ago). Haplogroup J bearers along with persons carrying the T mtDNA clade settled in Europe from the Near East during the late Paleolithic and Mesolithic.

Coalescence time estimates for the subclades of mitochondrial haplogroup J
Subclade	European coalescence time	Near East coalescence time
J1a1	27,300 years (± 8,000 years)	17,700 years (± 2,500 years)
J1a2	7,700 years (± 3,500 years)	—
J1b	5,000 years (± 2,200 years)	23,300 years (± 4,300 years)
J2a	19,200 years(± 6,900 years)	—
J2b1	—	15,000 years (± 5,000 years)
J2b2	16,600* years (± 8,100 years)	16,000 years (± 5,700 years)
J2b3	5,800 years (± 2,900 years)	—

*Typographical error, was 161,600 years from original source material as per time table describing the spread of populations given in the same study.

However, any statements concerning the geographic origin of this or any other haplogroup are highly speculative and considered by most population geneticists to be 'story telling' and outside the domain of science. Furthermore, inferring close associations between a haplogroup and a specific archaeological culture can be equally problematic.

Age of younger branches of mtHG J
Subclade Alphanumeric assignation	Calculated age via empirical spread and mutational drift rate ratio CI=95%
J2	28,259.7 ± 4,605.0 (Between 23,700 and 32,900 years old)
J2a	24,051.5 ± 4,183.2 (Between 19,900 and 28,200 years old)
J2a1	21,186.1 ± 4,485.5 (Between 16,700 and 25,700 years old)
J2a1a	12,986.1 ± 4,077.7 (Between 8,900 and 17,100 years old)
J2a1a1	8,949.8 ± 3,051.3 (Between 5,900 and 12,000 years old)
J2a1a1a	7,591.6 ± 2,889.6 (Between 4,700 and 10,500 years old)
J2a1a1a2	3,618.9 ± 2,973.9 (Between 600 and 6,600 years old)

== Distribution ==
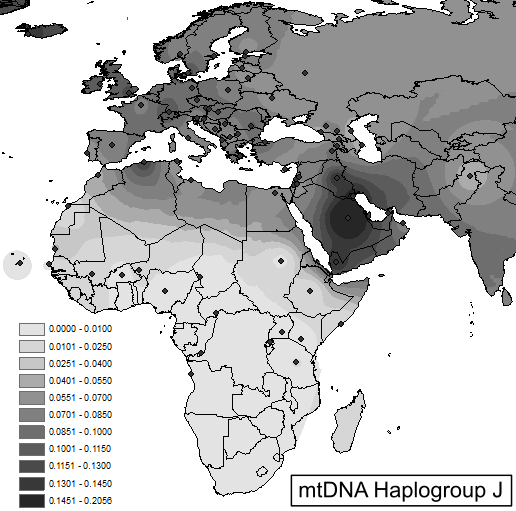
Projected spatial frequency distribution for haplogroup J.

Basal haplogroup J* is found among the Soqotri (9.2%).

The average frequency of haplogroup J as a whole is today highest in the Near East (12%), followed by Europe (11%), the Caucasus (8%) and Northeast Africa (6%). Of the two main sub-groups, J1 takes up four-fifths of the total and is spread widely on the continent while J2 is more localised around the Mediterranean, Greece, Italy/Sardinia and Spain.

There is also limited evidence that the subclade J1 has long been present in Central Asia. For instance, perhaps the highest incidence of haplogroup J is the 19% of Polish Roma, who belong to J1 (although this has also been ascribed to a "founder effect" of some kind). In Pakistan, where West Eurasian lineages occur at frequencies of up to 50% in some ethno-linguistic groups, the incidence of J1 averages around 5%, while J2 is very rare. However, J2 is found amongst 9% of the Kalash minority of north-west Pakistan.

In the Arabian peninsula, mtDNA haplogroup J is found among Saudis (10.5–18.8% J1b) and Yemenis (0–20% J1b). The J1b subclade also occurs in the Near East among Iraqis (7.1%) and Palestinians (4%).

In Africa, haplogroup J is concentrated in the northeast. It is found among Algerians (3.23–14.52%), as well as Sudanese Copts (10.3% J1a; 10.3% J2), Sudanese Fulani (10.7% J1b), Meseria (6.7% J1b), Arakien (5.9% J1b), Egyptians (5.9%), Mozabite Berbers (3.53%), Sudanese Hausa (2.9% J1b), Zenata Berbers (2.74%), Beja (2.1% J1b), and Reguibate Sahrawi (0.93%).

Within Europe, >2% frequency distribution of mtDNA J is as follows:

- J* = Ireland — 12%, England-Wales — 11%, Scotland — 9%, Orkney — 8%, Germany — 7%, Russia (European) — 7%, Iceland — 7%, Austria-Switzerland — 5%, Finland-Estonia — 5%, Spain-Portugal — 4%, France-Italy — 3%
- J1a = Austria-Switzerland — 3%
- J1b1 = Scotland — 4%
- J2 = France-Italy — 2%
- J2a = Homogenously spread in Europe; absent in the nations around the Caucasus; not known to be found elsewhere.
- J2b1 = Virtually absent in Europe; found in diverse forms in the Near East.
- J2b1a = Found in Western Europe and Russia.

Haplogroup J has also been found among ancient Egyptian mummies excavated at the Abusir el-Meleq archaeological site in Middle Egypt, which date from the Pre-Ptolemaic/late New Kingdom, Ptolemaic, and Roman periods. It has been found in Bronze Age population of La Hoya, in the Basque Country. Haplogroup J has been observed in ancient Guanche fossils excavated in Gran Canaria and Tenerife on the Canary Islands, which have been radiocarbon-dated to between the 7th and 11th centuries CE. All of the clade-bearing individuals were inhumed at the Tenerife site, with one specimen found to belong to the J1c3 subclade (1/7; ~14%). The J clade has also been found among Iberomaurusian specimens dating from the Epipaleolithic at the Afalou prehistoric site. Around 22% of the observed haplotypes belonged to various J subclades, including undifferentiated J (1/9; 11%) and J1c3f (1/9; 11%).

In Eastern Siberia, haplogroup J1c5 has been observed in samples of Yakuts (3/111 = 2.7% Vilyuy Yakut, 2/148 = 1.4% Northern Yakut, 1/88 = 1.1% Central Yakut, 1/164 = 0.6% Central Yakut), Evenks in Yakutia (4/125 = 3.2%), and Evens in Yakutia (1/105 = 1.0%). Haplogroup J2a2b3 has been observed in a sample of Nyukzha Evenks (2/46 = 4.3%). Haplogroup J2 also has been observed in a sample of Evenks collected in Olenyoksky District, Zhigansky District, and Ust-Maysky District of Yakutia (7/125 = 5.6%). One instance of haplogroup J1c10a1 has been observed in the Human Genome Diversity Project's sample of ten Oroqen individuals from northernmost China.

== Subclades ==
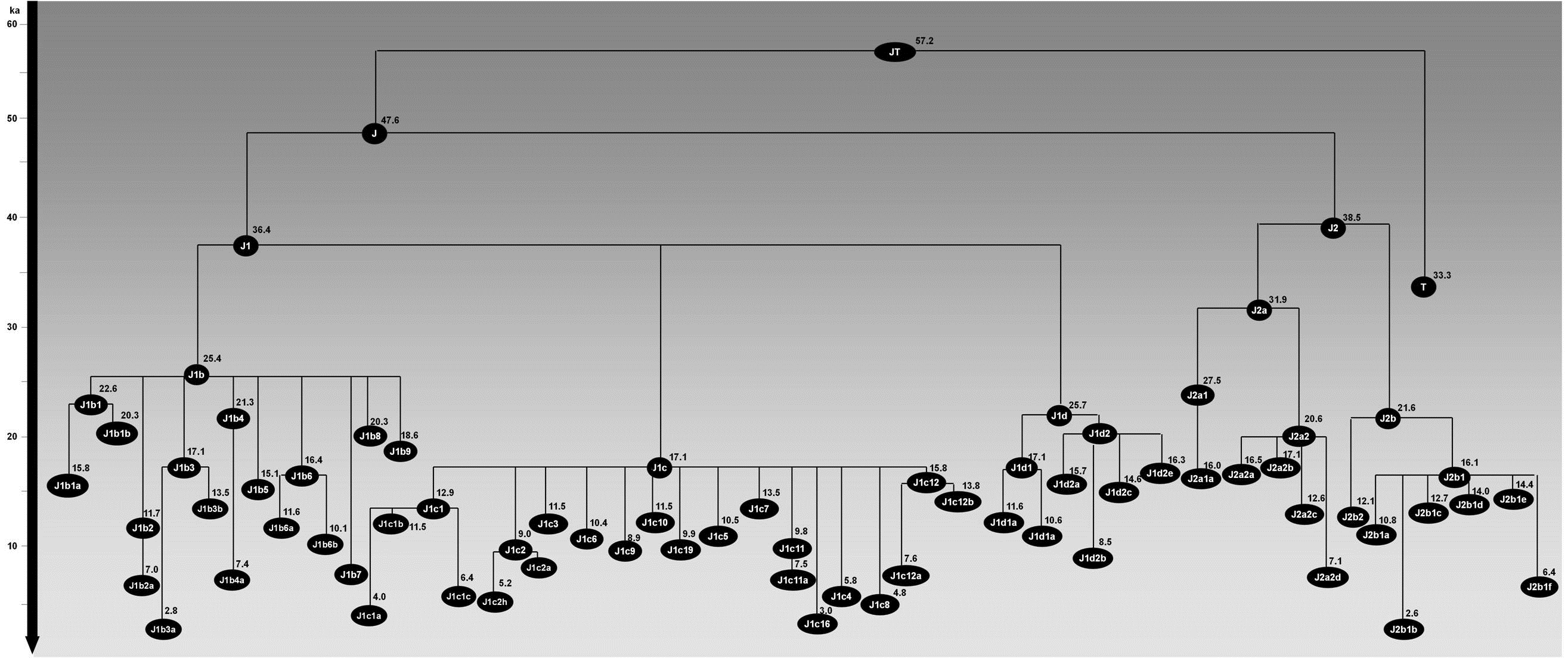
Schematic tree of mtDNA haplogroup J. Ages (in ka) indicated are maximum likelihood estimates obtained for the whole-mtDNA genome.

=== Tree ===
This phylogenetic tree of haplogroup J subclades is based on the paper by Mannis van Oven and Manfred Kayser Updated comprehensive phylogenetic tree of global human mitochondrial DNA variation and subsequent published research.

mtDNA HG "J" P-tree
- J
  - J1
    - J1b
      - J1b1
        - J1b1a
          - J1b1a1
          - J1b1a2
        - J1b1b
          - J1b1b1
      - J1b2
      - J1b3
    - J1c
      - J1c1
        - J1c1b
        - J1c1c
      - J1c2
        - J1c2a
        - J1c2b
          - J1c2b1
            - J1c2b1a
      - J1c3
        - J1c3a
          - J1c3a1
        - J1c3b
          - J1c3b1
        - J1c3c
      - J1c4
      - J1c5
        - J1c5a
      - J1c6
      - J1c7
        - J1c7a
      - J1c8
        - J1c8a
    - J1d
      - J1d1
  - J2
    - J2a
      - J2a1
        - J2a1a
          - J2a1a1
            - J2a1a1a
            - J2a1a1b
      - J2a2
        - J2a2a
    - J2b
      - J2b1
        - J2b1a
          - J2b1a1
          - J2b1a2
          - J2b1a3
        - J2b1b

Starting in 2025 and based on the above Phylotree, FamilyTreeDNA has further developed the mtDNA haplotree. Link to branch J.

== Genetic traits ==
It has been theorized that the uncoupling of oxidative phosphorylation related to SNPs which define mt-haplogroup J consequently produces higher body heat in the phenotype of mtDNA J individuals. This has been linked to selective pressure for the presence of the haplogroup in northern Europe, particularly Norway. Individuals from haplogroups UK, J1c and J2 were found to be more susceptible to Leber's hereditary optic neuropathy because they have reduced oxidative phosphorylation capacity, which results in part from lower mtDNA levels. J mtDNA has also been associated with HIV infected individuals displaying accelerated progression to AIDS and death. The T150C mutation, which is exclusive to but not definitive of, the J2 subclade of Haplogroup J may be part of a likely nuclearly controlled general machinery regarding the remodeling & replication of mtDNA. Controlling a remodeling which could accelerate mtDNA replication thus compensating for oxidative damage in mtDNA as well as functional deterioration occurring with old age related to it. Haplogroup J was found to be a protective factor against ischemic cardiomyopathy. It was also found that Haplogroup J was a protective factor among osteoarthritis patients from Spain but not from UK, and this was hypothesized to be due to a different genetic composition (polymorphisms) of the Haplogroup J in both populations. A study involving patients of European and West Asian origin or descent showed that individuals classified as haplogroup J or K demonstrated a significant decrease in risk of Parkinson's disease versus individuals carrying the most common haplogroup, H.

== Popular culture ==
- Ximena Navarrete Miss Universe 2010, is haplogroup J.
- Barbara Walters was a member of mtDNA haplogroup J1b1a.
- Esther Wojcicki is a member of mtDNA haplogroup J1c.
- Dolley Madison, First lady of the United States 1809 – 1817, had the mtDNA haplogroup J1c1b1a1d.
- Richard III of England had the mtDNA haplogroup J1c2c3, of his mother Cecily Neville, Duchess of York, grandmother Joan Beaufort, Countess of Westmorland, and Gt-Grandmother Katherine Swynford née Roet.
  - As would Richard's 3rd cousin, twice removed Thomas Chaucer MP, son of Geoffrey Chaucer (author) and his wife Philippa Roet.
- in Bryan Sykes' book The Seven Daughters of Eve, haplogroup J is referred to as 'Clan Jasmine'.

== See also ==
- Genealogical DNA test
- Genetic genealogy
- Human mitochondrial genetics
- Population genetics

Phylogenetic tree of human mitochondrial DNA (mtDNA) haplogroups

Mitochondrial Eve (L)

L0
L1–6

L1
L2

L3

L4
L5
L6
M
N

CZ
D
E
G
Q

O
A
S
R

I
W
X
Y
C
Z
B
F
R0

pre-JT

P

U
HV
JT
K
H
V
J
T
