= Haplogroup CZ =

Human mitochondrial DNA haplogroup

- Possible time of origin: 36.5 kya
- Ancestor: M8
- Descendants: C, Z
- Defining mutations: 249d

In human mitochondrial genetics, the Haplogroup CZ is a human mitochondrial DNA (mtDNA) haplogroup.

== Origin ==
Haplogroup CZ is a descendant of haplogroup M8 and is a parent to the haplogroups C and Z. The C and Z subclades share a common ancestor dated to approximately 36,500 years ago.

== Distribution ==
Today, CZ is found in eastern Asian, Central Asian, Siberian, indigenous American, and European populations, and is most common in Siberian populations. It is recognized by a genetic marker at 249d.

== Subclades ==
=== Tree ===
This phylogenetic tree of haplogroup CZ subclades is based on the paper by Mannis van Oven and Manfred Kayser Updated comprehensive phylogenetic tree of global human mitochondrial DNA variation and subsequent published research.

- M
  - M8
    - CZ
      - C
      - Z

== See also ==
- Genealogical DNA test
- Genetic genealogy
- Human mitochondrial genetics
- Population genetics
- Human mitochondrial DNA haplogroups

Phylogenetic tree of human mitochondrial DNA (mtDNA) haplogroups

Mitochondrial Eve (L)

L0
L1–6

L1
L2

L3

L4
L5
L6
M
N

CZ
D
E
G
Q

O
A
S
R

I
W
X
Y
C
Z
B
F
R0

pre-JT

P

U
HV
JT
K
H
V
J
T
