= Haplogroup Y =

Human mitochondrial DNA grouping indicating common ancestry

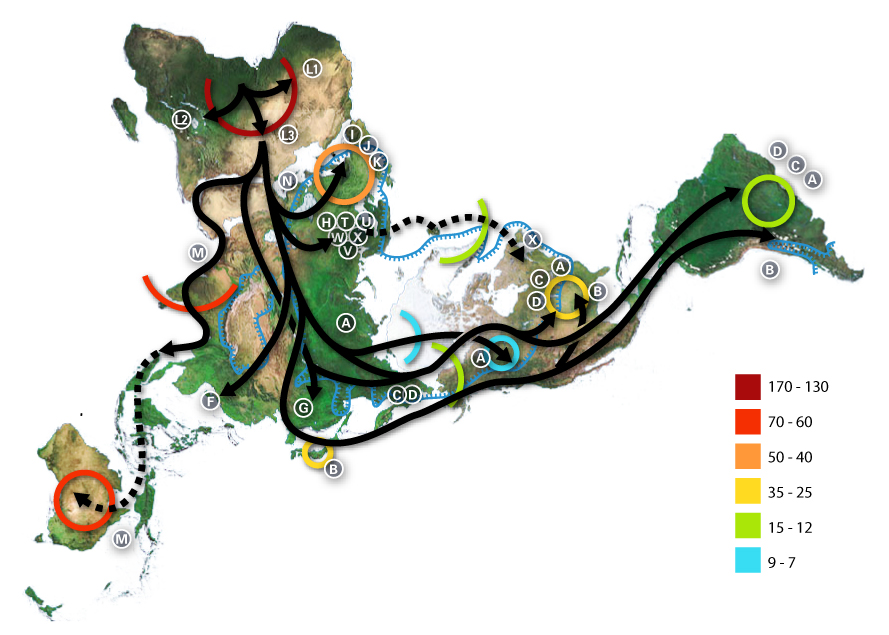
- Possible time of origin: 11,800 to 33,300 YBP
- Possible place of origin: Northeast Asia
- Ancestor: N9
- Descendants: Y1, Y2
- Defining mutations: 8392 10398 14178 14693 16126 16223 16231

In human mitochondrial genetics, Haplogroup Y is a human mitochondrial DNA (mtDNA) haplogroup.

== Origin ==
Haplogroup Y is a descendant of haplogroup N9.

== Distribution ==
Haplogroup Y has been found with high frequency in many indigenous populations who live around the Sea of Okhotsk, including approximately 66% of Nivkhs, approximately 43% of Ulchs, approximately 40% of Nanais, approximately 21% of Negidals, and approximately 20% of Ainus. It is also fairly common among indigenous peoples of the Kamchatka Peninsula (Koryaks, Itelmens) and among certain Austronesian peoples (especially groups closely related to Native Taiwanese).

The distribution of haplogroup Y in populations of the Malay Archipelago contrasts starkly with the absence or extreme rarity of this clade in populations of continental Southeast Asia in a manner reminiscent of haplogroup E. However, the frequency of haplogroup Y fades more smoothly away from its maximum around the Sea of Okhotsk in Northeast Asia, being found in approximately 2% of Koreans and in South Siberian and Central Asian populations with an average frequency of 1%.

The Y2 subclade has been observed in 40% (176/440) of a large pool of samples from Nias people in western Indonesia, ranging from a low of 25% (3/12) among the Zalukhu subpopulation to a high of 52% (11/21) among the Ho subpopulation.

=== Table of frequencies of mtDNA haplogroup Y ===
Population	Frequency	Count	Source	Subtypes
Nivkh (northern Sakhalin)	0.661	56	Starikovskaya 2005	Y1=37
Nivkh (northern Sakhalin)	0.658	38	Duggan 2013	Y1a=25
Ulchi (Old Bulava, New Bulava, Bogorodskoe, and Nizhniy Gavan villages)	0.431	160	Sukernik 2012	Y1a=69
Hezhen (China)	0.400	10	HGDP ( Lippold 2014)	Y1a=4
Indonesian (Nias)	0.400	440		Y2=176
Ulch (Old and New Bulava)	0.379	87	Starikovskaya 2005	Y1=33
Negidal	0.212	33	Starikovskaya 2005	Y1=7
Korean (Jeju Island)	0.217	799		Y=173
Ainu	0.196	51		Y1=10
Korean (Jeju Island)	0.168	113		Y=19
Indonesian (Medan, Sumatra)	0.167	42	Hill 2006	Y2=7
Filipino (Palawan)	0.150	20	Scholes 2011	Y2=3
Even (Berezovka)	0.133	15	Duggan 2013	Y1a=2
Filipino	0.129	62	Hill 2007	Y2=8
Evenk (Taimyr)	0.125	24	Duggan 2013	Y1a=3
Koryak	0.097	155	Starikovskaya 2005	Y=15
Evenk (Buryatia)	0.089	45	Derenko 2007	Y=4
Udegey (Gvasiugi, Imeni Lazo, Khabarovsk Krai)	0.087	46	Starikovskaya 2005	Y1=4
Filipino (Mindanao)	0.071	70	Tabbada 2010	Y2=5
Udegey (Gvasyugi, Khabarovsk Krai)	0.065	31	Duggan 2013	Y1a=2
Filipino	0.063	64	Tabbada 2010	Y2=4
Indonesian (Pekanbaru, Sumatra)	0.058	52	Hill 2006	Y2=3
Bukharan Arab (Uzbekistan/Kyrgyzstan)	0.050	20	Comas 2004	Y=1
Kazakh (Uzbekistan/Kyrgyzstan)	0.050	20	Comas 2004	Y=1
Tajik (Uzbekistan/Kyrgyzstan)	0.050	20	Comas 2004	Y=1
Orok (Sakhalin)	0.049	61	Bermisheva 2005	Y=3
Even (Eveno-Bytantaysky & Momsky)	0.048	105	Fedorova 2013	Y1a=5
Filipino (Luzon)	0.045	177	Tabbada 2010	Y2=8
Itelmen	0.043	47	Starikovskaya 2005	Y=2
Daur (Hulunbuir)	0.038	209		Y1a=6, Y2=2
Korean (Seoul)	0.037	134		Y=5
Mongolian (Dornod Province)	0.035	370		Y1=13
Batak (Palawan)	0.032	31	Scholes 2011	Y2=1
Gelao (Daozhen County, Guizhou)	0.032	31	Li 2007	Y1=1
Hani (Xishuangbanna, Yunnan)	0.030	33	Wen 2004	Y=1
Khamnigan (Buryatia)	0.030	99	Derenko 2007	Y=3
Han Chinese (Heilongjiang)	0.030	437		Y1a(xY1a1)=4, Y1b(xY1b1)=5, Y2=3
Korean	0.029	346	Maruyama 2003	Y=10
Evenk (Krasnoyarsk)	0.027	73	Derenko 2007	Y=2
Yakut (Vilyuy River basin)	0.027	111	Fedorova 2013	Y1a=3
Even (Kamchatka)	0.026	39	Duggan 2013	Y1a=1
Mongolian (Khovd Province)	0.025	429		Y1=11
Han Chinese (Jilin)	0.024	381		Y1a=3, Y1b=2, Y1b1=3, Y2=1
Korean (South Korea)	0.023	850		Y1=10, Y1a=2, Y1b1(xY1b1a)=4, Y2b=4
Tajik (Tajikistan)	0.023	44	Derenko 2007	Y=1
Yakut (Central)	0.023	88	Duggan 2013	Y1a=2
Daur (Evenk Autonomous Banner)	0.022	45	Kong 2003	Y1=1
Han Chinese (Anhui)	0.022	737		Y1=1, Y1a=3, Y1a1=3, Y1b=2, Y1b1=4, Y2=3
Han (Xinjiang)	0.021	47	Yao 2004	Y1=1
Mongolian (Ulaanbaatar)	0.021	47	Jin 2009	Y1=1
Mongolian (Mongolia)	0.019	2420		Y1=39, Y1a=6, Y2=2
Korean (South Korea)	0.019	593		Y=2, Y1=9
Kalmyk (Kalmykia)	0.018	110	Derenko 2007	Y=2
Kazakh (Kazakhstan)	0.018	55	Yao 2004	Y1=1
Japanese (Tōhoku)	0.018	336	Umetsu 2005	Y=6
Korean (Ulsan)	0.017	1094		Y=19
Uzbek (Xinjiang)	0.017	58	Yao 2004	Y1=1
Indonesian (Sulawesi)	0.017	237	Hill 2007	Y2=4
Han Chinese (Shandong)	0.016	1844		Y=1, Y1=4, Y1a=3, Y1a1=2, Y1b=6, Y1b1=8, Y2=6
Han Chinese (Jiangsu)	0.015	2471		Y=4, Y1=1, Y1a(xY1a1)=4, Y1b=4, Y1b1=17, Y1b1a=1, Y2=5
Mongolian (Khentii Province)	0.015	132		Y1=2
Korean (South Korea)	0.015	203	Umetsu 2005	Y=3
Taiwan aborigines	0.014	640	Peng 2011	Y=9
Buryat (Buryatia)	0.014	295	Derenko 2007	Y=4
Taiwanese	0.013	152	Maruyama 2003	Y=2
Indonesian (Adonara)	0.013	77	Mona 2009	Y2=1
Han Chinese (Beijing)	0.013	898		Y=1, Y1=3, Y1a=2, Y1b1=2, Y2=4
Han Chinese (Hebei)	0.013	1099		Y1=2, Y1a=1, Y1a1=2, Y1b=1, Y1b1=2, Y2=6
Mongolian (Sükhbaatar Province)	0.012	246		Y1=2, Y2=1
Indonesian (Bali)	0.012	82	Hill 2007	Y2=1
Han Chinese (Liaoning)	0.012	646		Y=2, Y1=1, Y1a1=1, Y1b1=2, Y2=2
Yakut (vicinity of Yakutsk)	0.012	164	Fedorova 2013	Y1a=2
Chinese	0.011	263	Maruyama 2003	Y=3
Taiwanese (Taipei, Taiwan)	0.011	91	Umetsu 2005	Y=1
Korean (South Korea)	0.011	185	Jin 2009	Y1=1, Y2=1
Kazakh (Kosh-Agachsky, Altai Republic)	0.010	98	Derenko 2012	Y1=1
Japanese (Miyazaki)	0.010	100	Uchiyama 2007	Y=1
Hmong (Jishou, Hunan)	0.010	103	Wen 2005	Y=1
Korean (South Korea)	0.010	103	Derenko 2007	Y=1
Buryat	0.008	126	Kong 2003	Y1=1
Tatar (Buinsk, Tatarstan)	0.008	126	Malyarchuk 2010	Y1b=1
Japanese (northern Kyūshū)	0.008	256	Umetsu 2005	Y=2
Barghut (Hulunbuir)	0.007	149	Derenko 2012	Y1=1
Okinawa	0.006	326	Umetsu 2005	Y=2
Japanese	0.005	211	Maruyama 2003	Y=1
Japanese (Hokkaidō)	0.005	217	Asari 2007	Y=1
Bashkir (Beloretsky, Sterlibashevsky, Ilishevsky, & Perm Oblast)	0.005	221	Bermisheva 2002	Y=1
Japanese (Japan)	0.005	1928		Y1=2, Y1a=2, Y1b1a=2, Y2=4
Japanese (Japan)	0.004	672		Y1b1a=1, Y2b=1, Y2d=1
Korean (South Korea)	0.004	261	Kim 2008	Y=1
Han (southern California)	0.003	390	Ji 2012	Y=1
Turkish people	0.003	773		Y1a1=2
Han (Taiwan)	0.001	1117	Ji 2012	Y=1
Dingban Yao (Mengla, Yunnan)	0.000	10	Wen 2005	-
Xiban Yao (Fangcheng, Guangxi)	0.000	11	Wen 2005	-
Chukchi (Anadyr)	0.000	15	Derenko 2007	-
Dungan (Uzbekistan/Kyrgyzstan)	0.000	16	Comas 2004	-
Uyghur (Uzbekistan/Kyrgyzstan)	0.000	16	Comas 2004	-
Yukaghir (Upper Kolyma)	0.000	18	Volodko 2008	-
Huatou Yao (Fangcheng, Guangxi)	0.000	19	Wen 2005	-
Crimean Tatar (Uzbekistan/Kyrgyzstan)	0.000	20	Comas 2004	-
Iranian (Uzbekistan/Kyrgyzstan)	0.000	20	Comas 2004	-
Karakalpak (Uzbekistan/Kyrgyzstan)	0.000	20	Comas 2004	-
Turkmen (Uzbekistan/Kyrgyzstan)	0.000	20	Comas 2004	-
Yi (Hezhang County, Guizhou)	0.000	20	Li 2007	-
Yukaghir (Verkhnekolymsky & Nizhnekolymsky)	0.000	22	Fedorova 2013	-
Guoshan Yao (Jianghua, Hunan)	0.000	24	Wen 2005	-
Hindu (Chitwan, Nepal)	0.000	24	Fornarino 2009	-
Nganasan	0.000	24	Starikovskaya 2005	-
Bunu (Dahua & Tianlin, Guangxi)	0.000	25	Wen 2005	-
Buryat (Kushun, Nizhneudinsk, Irkutsk Oblast)	0.000	25	Starikovskaya 2005	-
Kubachi (Dagestan)	0.000	25	Marchani 2008	-
Kurd (northwestern Iran)	0.000	25	Derenko 2007	-
Kumyk (Dagestan)	0.000	26	Marchani 2008	-
Lanten Yao (Tianlin, Guangxi)	0.000	26	Wen 2005	-
Iu Mien (Mengla, Yunnan)	0.000	27	Wen 2005	-
Indonesian (Palembang, Sumatra)	0.000	28	Hill 2006	-
Andhra Pradesh (tribal)	0.000	29	Fornarino 2009	-
Batek (Malaysia)	0.000	29	Hill 2006	-
Tujia (Yanhe County, Guizhou)	0.000	29	Li 2007	-
Cun (Hainan)	0.000	30	Peng 2011	-
Nu (Gongshan, Yunnan)	0.000	30	Wen 2004	-
Tujia (Yongshun, Hunan)	0.000	30	Wen 2004	-
Lingao (Hainan)	0.000	31	Peng 2011	-
Wuzhou Yao (Fuchuan, Guangxi)	0.000	31	Wen 2005	-
Yi (Luxi, Yunnan)	0.000	31	Wen 2004	-
Chuvantsi (Markovo, Chukotka)	0.000	32	Volodko 2008	-
Mendriq (Malaysia)	0.000	32	Hill 2006	-
Mien (Shangsi, Guangxi)	0.000	32	Wen 2005	-
Pan Yao (Tianlin, Guangxi)	0.000	32	Wen 2005	-
Nogai (Dagestan)	0.000	33	Marchani 2008	-
Temuan (Malaysia)	0.000	33	Hill 2006	-
Bapai Yao (Liannan, Guangdong)	0.000	35	Wen 2005	-
Tibetan (Zhongdian, Yunnan)	0.000	35	Wen 2004	-
Aleut (Commander Islands)	0.000	36	Volodko 2008	-
Pumi (Ninglang, Yunnan)	0.000	36	Wen 2004	-
Yakut (Yakutia)	0.000	36	Derenko 2007	-
Sireniki Eskimo	0.000	37	Volodko 2008	-
Ket	0.000	38	Starikovskaya 2005	-
Eskimo (Naukan)	0.000	39	Volodko 2008	-
Hmong (Wenshan, Yunnan)	0.000	39	Wen 2005	-
Nganasan	0.000	39	Volodko 2008	-
Han (Beijing)	0.000	40	Jin 2009	-
Kim Mun (Malipo, Yunnan)	0.000	40	Wen 2005	-
Manchurian	0.000	40	Jin 2009	-
Thai	0.000	40	Jin 2009	-
Tharu (Morang, Nepal)	0.000	40	Fornarino 2009	-
Uzbek (Uzbekistan/Kyrgyzstan)	0.000	40	Comas 2004	-
Yi (Shuangbai, Yunnan)	0.000	40	Wen 2004	-
Tu Yao (Hezhou, Guangxi)	0.000	41	Wen 2005	-
Lowland Yao (Fuchuan, Guangxi)	0.000	42	Wen 2005	-
Vietnamese	0.000	42	Jin 2009	-
Indonesian (Ambon)	0.000	43	Hill 2007	-
Indonesian (Mataram, Lombok)	0.000	44	Hill 2007	-
Hui (Xinjiang)	0.000	45	Yao 2004	-
Indonesian (Alor)	0.000	45	Hill 2007	-
Naxi (Lijiang, Yunnan)	0.000	45	Wen 2004	-
Tofalar	0.000	46	Starikovskaya 2005	-
Evenk (New Barag Left Banner)	0.000	47	Kong 2003	-
Kyrgyz (Sary-Tash)	0.000	47	Yao 2004	-
Mongolian (Ulaanbaatar)	0.000	47	Derenko 2007	-
Uyghur (Xinjiang)	0.000	47	Yao 2004	-
Hindu (New Delhi)	0.000	48	Fornarino 2009	-
Korean (Arun Banner)	0.000	48	Kong 2003	-
Kyrgyz (Talas)	0.000	48	Yao 2004	-
Mongol (New Barag Left Banner)	0.000	48	Kong 2003	-
Oirat Mongol (Xinjiang)	0.000	49	Yao 2004	-
Aini (Xishuangbanna, Yunnan)	0.000	50	Wen 2004	-
Eskimo (Chaplin)	0.000	50	Volodko 2008	-
Indonesian (Waingapu, Sumba)	0.000	50	Hill 2007	-
Jahai (Malaysia)	0.000	51	Hill 2006	-
Korean (northern China)	0.000	51	Jin 2009	-
Senoi (Malaysia)	0.000	52	Hill 2006	-
Kazakh (Xinjiang)	0.000	53	Yao 2004	-
Teleut (Kemerovo)	0.000	53	Derenko 2007	-
Chuvash (Morgaushsky, Chuvashia)	0.000	55	Bermisheva 2002	-
Uyghur (Kazakhstan)	0.000	55	Yao 2004	-
Tibetan (Qinghai)	0.000	56	Wen 2004	-
Khakassian (Khakassia)	0.000	57	Derenko 2007	-
Semelai (Malaysia)	0.000	61	Hill 2006	-
Komi-Zyryan (Sysolsky, Komi Republic)	0.000	62	Bermisheva 2002	-
Mansi	0.000	63	Pimenoff 2008	-
Tujia (western Hunan)	0.000	64	Wen 2004	-
Chukchi	0.000	66	Starikovskaya 2005	-
Bai (Dali, Yunnan)	0.000	68	Wen 2004	-
Saami (Finland)	0.000	69	Tambets 2004	-
Tatar (Aznakayevo, Tatarstan)	0.000	71	Malyarchuk 2010	-
Telenghit (Altai Republic)	0.000	71	Derenko 2007	-
Tubalar (Turochaksky & Choysky, Altai Republic)	0.000	72	Starikovskaya 2005	-
Komi-Permyak (Komi-Permyak Autonomous Okrug)	0.000	74	Bermisheva 2002	-
Siberian Eskimo	0.000	79	Starikovskaya 2005	-
Persian (eastern Iran)	0.000	82	Derenko 2007	-
Shor (Kemerovo)	0.000	82	Derenko 2007	-
Yukaghir (Lower Kolyma-Indigirka)	0.000	82	Volodko 2008	-
Altai Kizhi	0.000	90	Derenko 2007	-
Tuvan	0.000	95	Starikovskaya 2005	-
Eskimo (Canada)	0.000	96	Volodko 2008	-
Mansi	0.000	98	Starikovskaya 2005	-
Saami (Sweden)	0.000	98	Tambets 2004	-
Udmurt (Malopurginsky, Udmurtia & Tatyshlinsky, Bashkortostan)	0.000	101	Bermisheva 2002	-
Gelao (Daozhen County, Guizhou)	0.000	102	Liu 2011	-
Mordvinian (Staroshaygovsky, Mordovia)	0.000	102	Bermisheva 2002	-
Tuvinian	0.000	105	Derenko 2007	-
Khanty	0.000	106	Pimenoff 2008	-
Yakut	0.000	117	Kong 2003	-
Evenk (Ust-Maysky, Oleneksky, & Zhigansky, Yakutia)	0.000	125	Fedorova 2013	-
Tharu (Chitwan, Nepal)	0.000	133	Fornarino 2009	-
Mari (Zvenigovsky, Mari El)	0.000	136	Bermisheva 2002	-
Han (Southwest China; pool of 44 Sichuan, 34 Chongqing, 33 Yunnan, & 26 Guizhou)	0.000	137	Ji 2012	-
Yakut (northern Yakutia)	0.000	148	Fedorova 2013	-
Dolgan (Anabarsky, Volochanka, Ust-Avam, and Dudinka)	0.000	154	Fedorova 2013	-
Chinese (Shenyang, Liaoning)	0.000	160	Umetsu 2005	-
Aleut (Aleutian Islands)	0.000	163	Volodko 2008	-
Cham (Bình Thuận, Vietnam)	0.000	168	Peng 2010	-
Tatar (Almetyevsky and Yelabuzhsky, Tatarstan)	0.000	228	Bermisheva 2002	-
Saami (Norway)	0.000	278	Tambets 2004	-
Japanese (Tōkai)	0.000	282	Umetsu 2005	-
Tibetan (Tibet)	0.000	289	Ji 2012	-
Li (Hainan)	0.000	346	Peng 2011	-
Eskimo (Greenland)	0.000	385	Volodko 2008	-

== Subclades ==
Haplogroup Y has been divided into two primary subclades, Y1 and Y2. In a study published in 2016, mtDNA haplogroup Y1a was observed in an Ulchi sampled in Nizhniy Gavan, Lower Amur, whereas mtDNA haplogroup Y2a1 was observed in an Igorot from Mountain Province, Luzon Island, Philippines (sampled in Singapore) and in a Hawaiian.Το Y2a1 στις κεβτρικες φιλιππίνες ειναι 2% κατσ μεσο ορο λογου ρου 24% wmεως 30% B5b1c στους visayas στο ξορθιο λουζον 5% ενω στο βορρα στο 10%

Y1 predominates in the Northeast Asian range of haplogroup Y, which is centered on the Sea of Okhotsk. Y1* has been observed in two Uyghurs, a Minnan Han Chinese in Taiwan, and a Khamnigan. Y1a* has been observed in a Nivkh, in a Buryat in Zabaikal, in Mongolia, in a Daur and a Han Chinese in China, in Korea and in Tibet. Y1a with an additional T16189C mutation is common among the Nivkhs and among several Tungusic peoples (Hezhen in the PRC, Ulchi, Udegey, Even in the basins of the Kolyma and Indigirka rivers). Y1a1 has been observed in at least five Uyghurs, a Kyrgyz, a Buryat in Buryat Republic, a Hezhen in China, an Udegey, three Evenks in Taimyr, and two Yakuts in central Sakha Republic. Y1a2 has been observed in Koryaks and in an Even in Kamchatka. Y1a appears to be a relatively young haplogroup, with an age of 6,000 (95% CI 3,300 <-> 8,800) years estimated from 13 complete genomes (Ulchi x 6, Nivkh x 3, Koryak x 2, Even x 1, Mongolian x 1); however, this estimate may be relevant only for the TMRCA of Y1a2 and most Y1a* and Y1a-T16189C haplotypes, as it is not certain that any of the Y1a mtDNAs that have been analyzed belong to the Y1a1 clade. (However, YFull has estimated the TMRCA of the entire Y1a clade, including all tabulated members of Y1a1 and Y1a* as well as Y1a+T16189C and Y1a2, to be 6,300 [95% CI 3,800 <-> 9,800] ybp, so the addition of members of the Y1a1 subclade apparently does not significantly affect the estimate of the time to most recent common ancestor of the Y1a clade.) Y1b has been observed in a Tatar from Buinsk, Y1b1 has been observed in China, and Y1b1a has been observed in China and in Japan. The age of the entire Y1 clade has been estimated from 17 complete genomes (including the 13 aforementioned members of the Y1a clade plus one Japanese, one Chinese, and one Tatar member of the Y1b clade plus one Khamnigan member of Y1*) to be 12,400 (95% CI 5,900 <-> 19,100) ybp.

Y2a predominates in the Southeast Asian range of haplogroup Y, which is centered on the Philippines and Sumatra. However, Y2b has been observed in Japan and in a Buryat, and Y2* has been observed in Chinese, Japanese, and Khamnigan samples.

=== Tree ===
This phylogenetic tree of haplogroup Y subclades is based on the paper by Mannis van Oven and Manfred Kayser Updated comprehensive phylogenetic tree of global human mitochondrial DNA variation and subsequent published research.

- Y
  - Y1 - South Siberia, China, Korea
    - Y1a - Nivkh, Ulchi, Hezhen
      - Y1a1 - China (Beijing, Liaoning)
      - Y1a-T16189C!
        - Y1a2
    - Y1b - Korea, China (North China, Northeast China)
      - Y1b1 - Korea, China
        - Y1b1a - Korea
  - Y2
    - Y2a - Philippines, Indonesia
      - Y2a1
        - Y2a1a
    - Y2b - Korea, Japan

== See also ==
- Genealogical DNA test
- Genetic genealogy
- Human mitochondrial genetics
- Population genetics

Phylogenetic tree of human mitochondrial DNA (mtDNA) haplogroups

Mitochondrial Eve (L)

L0
L1–6

L1
L2

L3

L4
L5
L6
M
N

CZ
D
E
G
Q

O
A
S
R

I
W
X
Y
C
Z
B
F
R0

pre-JT

P

U
HV
JT
K
H
V
J
T
