= Haplogroup HV =

Human mitochondrial DNA grouping indicating common ancestry

- Possible time of origin: 28 kya
- Possible place of origin: West Asia (Near East or Caucasus)
- Ancestor: R0
- Descendants: HV0, HV1, HV2, HV3, HV4, HV5, H, V
- Defining mutations: T14766C

Haplogroup HV is a human mitochondrial DNA (mtDNA) haplogroup.

== Origin ==
Haplogroup HV derives from the haplogroup R0, which in turn descends from haplogroup R. HV is also the ancestral clade to the haplogroups H and V. A possible origin of HV haplogroup is in the region of Western Iran, Mesopotamia, and the South Caucasus, where the highest prevalence of HV has been found.

== Distribution ==
Haplogroup HV is found mainly in Western Asia, Central Asia, Southern Europe, Eastern Europe, and North Africa.

In Africa, the clade peaks among Egyptians inhabiting El-Hayez oasis (14.3%). with the HV0 subclade occurring among Mozabite Berbers (8.24%), Libyans (7.4%), Reguibate Sahrawi (6.48%), Zenata Berbers (5.48%), and Algerians (4.84% total; 2.15%-3.75% in Oran).

In a study published in 2013, haplogroup HV(xHV0, H) was found in great percentages of populations in Afghanistan: 11.0% (14/127) Uzbek (including 1/127 HV2 and 1/127 HV6), 8.2% (12/146) Tajik (including 3/146 HV6 and 1/146 HV2), 8.0% (6/75) Turkmen (including 1/75 HV2), 6.4% (5/78) Hazara, and 5.6% (5/90) Pashtun. Furthermore, haplogroup HV0 was found in 1.4% (2/146) of the sample of Afghan Tajiks, but it is unclear whether these belong to the haplogroup V subclade. The subclade HV1a1a has been found in 1.8% (3/169) of Yakuts in one study and 1.2% (5/423) of Yakuts in another study published in 2013.

A 2003 study was published reporting on the mtDNA sequencing of the bones of two 24,000-year-old anatomically modern humans of the Cro-Magnon type from southern Italy. The study showed one was of either haplogroup HV or R0. Haplogroup HV has also been found among ancient Egyptian mummies excavated at the Abusir el-Meleq archaeological site in Middle Egypt, which date from the Pre-Ptolemaic/late New Kingdom, Ptolemaic, and Roman periods.

Haplogroup HV has been found in various fossils that were analysed for ancient DNA, including specimens associated with the Alföld Linear Pottery (HV, Mezőkövesd-Mocsolyás, 1/3 or 33%), Linearbandkeramik (HV0a, Fajsz-Garadomb, 1/2 or 50%), and Germany Middle Neolithic (HV, Quedlinburg, 1/2 or 50%) cultures.

== Subclades ==
=== Tree ===
This phylogenetic tree of haplogroup HV subclades is based on the paper by van Oven (2009) and Malyarchuk et al. (2008).

- HV
  - HV0 (formerly known as pre-V)
    - HV0a (formerly known as preV*2)
      - HV0a1
      - V
    - 195 (formerly known as preV*1)
      - HV0b
      - HV0c
  - HV1
    - HV1a
      - HV1a1
        - HV1a1a
      - HV1a2
    - HV1b
      - HV1b1
      - HV1b2
    - HV1c
  - 73
    - HV2
      - HV2a
  - HV4
    - HV4a
  - HV5
  - 16311 (formerly known as HV3) (13±2 kya)
    - HV6 (formerly known as HV3b) (15.4±4.5 kya)
      - HV6a (formerly known as HV3b1)
    - HV7 (formerly known as HV3c)
    - HV8 (formerly known as HV3d)
    - HV9 (formerly known as HV3a) (8.2±2.9 kya)
      - 152
        - HV9a
    - HV10
  - H

=== HV0 and HVSI C16298T ===
Defining mutation C/T at location 16298 in segment I one of the hypervariable segment is labeled as HV0 as of 2012. The percentage of people that tested positive for the above mutation in a study of western European populations in 2002 is given below.

Population	#No	% of population
Finland	50	12
Norway	323	4
Scotland	874	4
England	262	3
North Germany	140	6
South Germany	266	5
France	213	3
Galicia	135	5
North Portugal	184	7
Central Portugal	162	3
South Portugal	196	4
North Africa	349	5

In a study of Russian and Polish populations the percentage of people who tested positive for this mutation was five percent for both populations.

Population	#No	Percentage
Polish	436	5
Russian	201	5

A study of Iraqis summarized a number of previous studies showing low levels of this mutation amongst Middle Eastern and Italian populations.

Population	#No	% of population
Iraqi	216	0.5
Syrian	69	2.9
Georgian	139	0.7
Italian	99	5.1

This mutation has been detected in ancient DNA obtained from one of nineteen human remains excavated on the island of Gotland, Sweden, dated to 2,800-2,000 BC and archaeologically classified as belonging to the Pitted Ware culture.

== Popular culture ==
- Writer and anthropologist Ruth Behar is a member of haplogroup HV1.
- Author and journalist Stephen J. Dubner is a member of haplogroup HV5.

== See also ==
- Genealogical DNA test
- Genetic genealogy
- Population genetics

Phylogenetic tree of human mitochondrial DNA (mtDNA) haplogroups

Mitochondrial Eve (L)

L0
L1–6

L1
L2

L3

L4
L5
L6
M
N

CZ
D
E
G
Q

O
A
S
R

I
W
X
Y
C
Z
B
F
R0

pre-JT

P

U
HV
JT
K
H
V
J
T
