= Cambridge Reference Sequence =

Reference sequence of human mitochondrial DNA

Gene map of the human mitochondrial genome corresponding to the revised Cambridge Reference Sequence.

The Cambridge Reference Sequence (CRS) for human mitochondrial DNA was first announced in 1981.

A group led by Fred Sanger at the University of Cambridge had sequenced the mitochondrial genome of one woman of European descent during the 1970s, determining it to have a length of 16,569 base pairs (0.0006% of the nuclear human genome) containing some 37 genes and published this sequence in 1981. Due to a mistake the actual length of it is 16,568.

When other researchers repeated the sequencing, some striking discrepancies were noted. The original published sequence included eleven errors, including one extra base pair in position 3107del (it was C, but now it is N), and incorrect assignments of single base pairs. Some of these were the result of contamination with bovine and HeLa specimens. The corrected revised CRS was published by Andrews et al. in 1999. (The original nucleotide numbering was retained to avoid confusion.) The reference sequence belongs to macro-European haplogroup H2a2a1. The revised CRS is designated as rCRS. It is deposited in the GenBank NCBI database under accession number NC_012920.

When mitochondrial DNA sequencing is used for genealogical purposes, the results are often reported as differences from the revised CRS. The CRS is a reference sequence rather than a record of the earliest human mtDNA. A difference between a tested sample and the CRS may have arisen in the lineage of the CRS or in the lineage of the tested sample. The CRS includes seven nucleotides that are rare polymorphisms: 263A, 311C-315C, 750A, 1438A, 4769A, 8860A, and 15326A.

An alternative African (Yoruba) reference sequence has also been used sometimes instead of the Cambridge. It has a different numbering system with a length of 16,571 base pairs and represents the mitochondrial genome of one African individual. Other alternative reference sequences that have also sometimes been used include the African (Uganda), Swedish and Japanese sequences.

In 2012, it was proposed that the revised Cambridge Reference Sequence (rCRS), should be replaced by a new Reconstructed Sapiens Reference Sequence (RSRS). The RSRS keeps the same numbering system as the CRS, but represents the ancestral genome of Mitochondrial Eve, from which all currently known human mitochondria descend. The RSRS should be more useful for comparing the changes in different haplogroups although this has been debated. Family Tree DNA reports results for mtDNA for both rCRS and RSRS.
