= Haplogroup F (mtDNA) =

Human mitochondrial DNA haplogroup

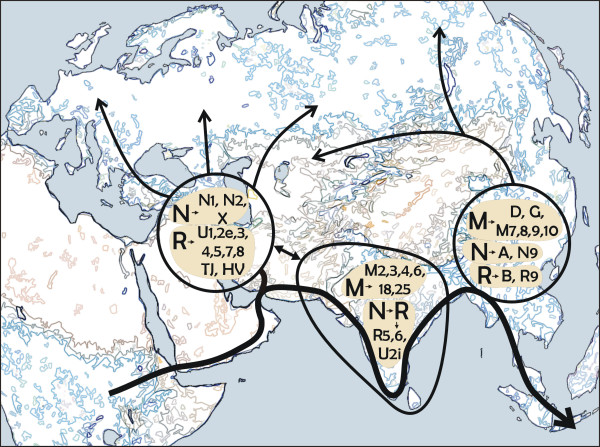
- Possible time of origin: 43,400 YBP
- Possible place of origin: Asia
- Ancestor: R9
- Descendants: F1, F2, F3, F4
- Defining mutations: 249d, 6392, 10310

Haplogroup F is a human mitochondrial DNA (mtDNA) haplogroup. The clade is most common in East Asia and Southeast Asia. It has not been found among Native Americans.

It is a primary branch of haplogroup R9.

== Distribution ==
The F haplogroup is fairly common in East Asia. High frequencies of the clade are found among the Lahu from Yunnan (33% - 77%, average 52%), Nicobar Islands (50%), Shors from Kemerovo Oblast of Siberia (41%), and Arunachal Pradesh, India (31%). There is also an important frequency in Taiwanese aborigines, Khakas, Kets, Han Chinese (and, thus, nearly all of China), Lombok, Sumba, Thailand, and Vietnam. Its distribution extends with low frequency to the Tharu of southern Nepal and the Bashkirs of the southern Urals.

Haplogroup F also occurs at low frequencies on the Comoros Islands (<10%). It is also found at low frequencies on the Hvar island in Croatia (8.3%).

== Subclades ==
F1a clearly predominates among the representatives of haplogroup F in Southeast Asia, but subclades of this haplogroup have been found in populations as far north as the Buryats and Ulchi of Siberia.

F1b tends to become more frequent as a fraction of total F in populations of the northern parts of East Asia and Central Asia, such as Mongols, Kazakhs, Uyghurs, and Japanese. It also has been found among the Yi people. There are odd exclaves of F1b in Gaininsk Bashkirs of Perm Oblast and Croats of Hvar Island.

F1d is the second most frequent sub-clade in Newar (Nepal). Haplogroup F1d reaches the greatest proportion in Newar (11.97%) of Nepal and Kshatriya (16%) of North India.

F2 has been found mainly in the form of F2a, which has been observed in more than 10% of a couple samples of Nu and Lisu from Gongshan, Yunnan. F2 has been found with frequencies exceeding 5% in several other populations of Southwest China, Guangxi, and Hainan, including the Han majority population. Outside of southwestern China, F2 has been found with frequency greater than 5% in a sample of Oirat Mongols from Xinjiang and a sample of Khakas from Khakassia, with the former population boasting particularly high diversity within this clade.

F3 is especially common among Austronesian peoples of Taiwan and the Malay Archipelago, but it also has been found in many populations of Southwest China and South-Central China, and in a sample of Hans from Xinjiang.

F4 has been found mainly in aboriginal populations of Taiwan and Hainan, with some representatives among samples of Filipinos from Luzon, Indonesians from Sumatra, and Hans and Uzbeks from Xinjiang.

=== Tree ===
This phylogenetic tree of haplogroup F subclades is based on the paper by Mannis van Oven and Manfred Kayser Updated comprehensive phylogenetic tree of global human mitochondrial DNA variation and subsequent published research.

- F
  - F* – China, Korea
  - F1
    - F1a'c'f – Thailand (Kaleun in Nakhon Phanom Province), China, Korea, Kazakhstan
      - F1a – China, Korea, Uyghur, Thailand, Mongolia
        - F1a1'4 – Thailand (Khon Mueang in Chiang Rai Province), China (Ma'an site, Wuxi, Majiabang culture)
          - F1a1 – Japan, Korea, China, Ulchi, Uyghur, Vietnam (incl. Cờ Lao), Laos, Thailand, Indonesia, Mexico
            - F1a1a – Thailand, Laos, Vietnam, China (Zhanjiang, etc.), Tibet, Indonesia
              - F1a1a1 – Vietnam, Laos, Thailand, Cambodia, Nicobar Islands, Malaysia, Indonesia, China, Uyghur
            - F1a1b – Japan, Korea
            - F1a1c – Zhuang (Bama), Thailand, Tibet, Buryats (Inner Mongolia and Irkutsk Oblast), Japan
              - F1a1c1 – Moken
              - F1a1c2 – Japan, Xibo, China (Shanghai)
            - F1a1d – Thailand, China, Taiwanese Aborigines (Tsou, Bunun, Rukai), Philippines
              - F1a1d1 – Tao (Orchid Island)
          - F1a4
            - F1a4a – Thailand, Han Chinese (Denver), Ulchi
              - F1a4a1 – Taiwanese Aborigines (Tsou, Makatao, Bunun, Ami, etc.), Philippines (Ivatan, Ibaloi, Abaknon, Bugkalot, Kalangoya, Dulag, etc.), Guam, Malaysia (Kelantan Malay), Sumatra, Vietnam (Dao), Thailand (Khon Mueang in Mae Hong Son Province and Chiang Mai Province), South Africa
            - F1a4b – China
        - F1a2 – Thailand, Vietnam (Hmong), China (Guizhou)
          - F1a2a – Thailand (Phutai in Sakon Nakhon Province, Nyaw in Nakhon Phanom Province, Mon in Lopburi Province), China (Han in Zhanjiang, Dong, etc.)
        - F1a3
          - F1a3a – Philippines (Lipa City, Abaknon, Batak from Palawan Island, Aeta from Bataan), Taiwan, Indonesia
            - F1a3a1 – Taiwan (Bunun, Puyuma, etc.)
              - F1a3a1a – Japan, Korea
            - F1a3a2 – Philippines (Ivatan)
            - F1a3a3 – Taiwanese Aborigines (Tsou, Bunun, Makatao, Thao), Philippines (Ivatan)
            - F1a3a7 - Philippines, Malaysia, Indonesia
            - F1a3a8 - Philippines
          - F1a3b - China (Hunan Han, etc.), Taiwan (Minnan from Kaohsiung, etc.), Kazakhstan (Jetisu)
          - F1a3c (C10223T) - Thailand (Khmer, etc.), China (Han)
          - F1a3e (C11860T) - Thailand, China (Uyghurs)
      - F1c – Japan
        - F1c1 – Japan
          - F1c1a – Korea, Xinjiang, Tibet, Jammu and Kashmir, Thailand (Palaung in Chiang Mai Province, Khmu in Nan Province, Khon Mueang in Lampang Province)
            - F1c1a1 – Russia, China (Qingdao, etc.), Evenk (New Barag Left Banner), Oroqen, Zhuang (Bama), Taiwan (Minnan)
              - F1c1a1a – Tibet (Shannan, Sherpa, etc.), Yi
              - F1c1a1b – China
            - F1c1a2 – Tibet, Thailand, China (Chongqing), India
      - F1f – Thailand, China, Lahu, Myanmar, Tibet, Cambodia, Vietnam (Hmong)
    - F1-T16189C!
      - F1b - Korea, Japan, Mongolia, China (North China)
        - F1b1 – China, Tibet (Shigatse, etc.), Ladakh, Uyghur (Artux, etc.), Kyrgyz, Azeri, Kurd (Iran), Armenian, Turkey, Russia, Croatia
          - F1b1a – Japan, Korea, Uyghur
            - F1b1a1 – Japan, Korea
              - F1b1a1a – Japan, Korea, USA (African American)
                - F1b1a1a1 – Japan, Korea
                  - F1b1a1a1a – Japan
                - F1b1a1a2 – Japan, Korea
                - F1b1a1a3 – Japan
            - F1b1a2 – Japan, Korea
          - F1b1b – Yakut, Uyghur, Kyrgyz, Turk, Even (Sakkyryyr, Tompo), Korea
          - F1b1c – China, Yi, Buryat
          - F1b1d – Japan, Korea
          - F1b1e – Uyghur, Kyrgyz, Buryat, Oroqen, Russian (Sverdlovsk Oblast)
            - F1b1e1 – Yakut
          - F1b1f – China, Uyghur, Buryat (Buryat Republic), Yakut (Namsky District), Evenk (Stony Tunguska River basin), Hungary (ancient Avars)
      - F1d – China (Hunan, Zhejiang, Jiangsu, Beijing, Liaoning, Korean from Antu County, Hezhen, Minnan, Lhasa, etc.), Thailand (Mon in Kanchanaburi Province), South Korea, Japan, Kyrgyz (Artux, Ak-Say), ancient Scythian
        - F1d1 – Tibet, Nepal (Tharu), Newar of Nepal (12%), Myanmar, Thailand (Mon in Kanchanaburi Province), China, Japan, South Africa
      - F1e
        - F1e1 – China (North China), Mongolia
          - F1e1a – Japan
        - F1e2 – China, Kyrgyz (Tashkurgan)
        - F1e3 – China (Guangdong, etc.), Laos (Lao in Vientiane), Thailand (Phuan in Lopburi Province and Phichit Province), Sumatra, Vietnam (Kinh)
      - F1g – Tibet, Thailand (Phuan in Lopburi Province, Sukhothai Province, and Phichit Province), China, Kyrgyz (Tashkurgan)
        - F1g1 – China (Yunnan, etc.), Vietnam (Hmong, Dao), Nepal (Newar, 2.4%)
  - F2
    - F2* – Laos (Lao in Vientiane), China, Hong Kong, Uyghur (Artux)
    - F2a'b'g
      - F2a – China (Han from Beijing, Xinjiang, etc.), Taiwan (Makatao), Korea, Japan, Kazakhstan
        - F2a1 – China (Han from Shandong), Naxi, Bai, Nu, Tu (Monguor), Yi, Tibetan
        - F2a2 – China (Han from Zhanjiang, etc.), Miao (Guizhou), Kinh (Guangxi), Dai and Lisu (Yunnan)
        - F2a3 – China (Han from Xinjiang, Yunnan, Qinghai, and Shandong), Tu, Hui, Mongols in Inner Mongolia
      - F2b – China (Han from Qingdao), Taiwan (Hakka)
        - F2b1 – Thailand (Lao Isan in Roi Et Province and Chaiyaphum Province, Khon Mueang in Lampang Province), China (Han from Beijing, Xinjiang, etc.), Buryat (Irkutsk Oblast), Yakut, Even (NE Sakha Republic), Yukaghir (NE Sakha Republic), Nepal (Newar, 1.1%)
      - F2g – China, Ladakh
    - F2c – China
      - F2c1 – China (Shantou, etc.), Japan
      - F2c2 – China (Han from Beijing), Kyrgyzstan (Kyrgyz)
    - F2d – China, Uyghur, Thailand (Khon Mueang in Chiang Mai Province and Lamphun Province), Singapore, Japan, Kazakhstan
    - F2e – China, Thailand (Tai Yuan in Uttaradit Province, Phuan in Phrae Province and Lopburi Province, Khon Mueang in Chiang Mai Province), Vietnam (Dao)
      - F2e1 – China, Barghut (Hulun Buir)
    - F2f – Japan, Korea, China, Pakistan (Hazara), Azerbaijan (Astara), Bashkortostan (Bashkir), Poland
    - F2h'i – China
      - F2h – China, Tibet (Lhasa), Taiwan, Thailand (Tai Dam in Kanchanaburi Province)
      - F2i – China, Taiwan (Makatao), Korea
  - F3 (formerly R9a)
    - F3a – China (Han from Ili, etc.), Uyghur, Thailand
      - F3a1 – China (Han from Yunnan, Guizhou, Shantou, Lanzhou, etc.), Kyrgyz (Tashkurgan), Taiwan (Hakka, etc.), Thailand (Phuan in Suphan Buri Province, Shan in Mae Hong Son Province, Khon Mueang in Chiang Rai Province, Mae Hong Son Province, Chiang Mai Province, Lamphun Province, and Lampang Province), Vietnam (Hmong, Dao)
    - F3b – Thailand, Japan, Korea, China (Han from Qijiang), Yi
      - F3b1 – Philippines, Comoros (Comorian from Grande Comore), USA
        - F3b1a – Taiwan (Rukai, Puyuma, Paiwan, Tsou, Makatao, Bunun, Ami, etc.), Philippines (Maranao)
          - F3b1a1 – Philippines (Bugkalot), Indonesia
          - F3b1a2 – Taiwan (Puyuma, Bunun, Paiwan, etc.)
        - F3b1b – Madagascar, Sumatra, Philippines (Batak from Palawan Island)
          - F3b1b1 – Philippines (Ibaloi, Kankanaey, Ifugao), Spain, Denmark
  - F4
    - F4a – Thailand/Laos, China, Taiwan, Korea
      - F4a1
        - F4a1a – Japan, China (Han from Lanzhou, She), Taiwan
        - F4a1b – China, Japan
      - F4a2 – China, Laos (Lao in Vientiane and Luang Prabang), Thailand (Phuan in Lopburi Province, Nyah Kur in Chaiyaphum Province, Khon Mueang in Lamphun Province)
    - F4b – China (Han from Beijing), Thailand (Khon Mueang in Mae Hong Son Province, Lao Isan in Roi Et Province)
      - F4b1 – China, Taiwan (Atayal, Bunun, Saisiyat, Thao, Tsou, Ami, Makatao, etc.), Philippines, Madagascar

== Table of frequencies by ethnic group ==
Population	Frequency	Count	Source	Subtypes
Lahu (Lancang, Yunnan)	0.771	35		F1a=18, F(xF1a, F1b, F1c, F2a)=9
Senoi (Malaysia)	0.442	52		F1a1a=23
Tujia (Yongshun, Hunan)	0.433	30		F(xF1a, F1b, F1c, F2a)=6, F1a=4, F1c=2, F1b=1
Shor (Kemerovo)	0.415	82		F1=33, F2a=1
Lahu (Simao, Yunnan)	0.344	32		F1a=10, F2a=1
Lahu (Xishuangbanna, Yunnan)	0.333	15		F1a=3, F1b=1, F1c=1
Pan Yao (Tianlin, Guangxi)	0.313	32		F3=2, F1b=2, F1a1a=2, F1a1(xF1a1a)=2, F1a(xF1a1)=1, F1c=1
Yi (Hezhang County, Guizhou)	0.300	20		F1b=4, F1a=2
Lingao (Hainan)	0.290	31		F(xF1, F2, F3, F4)=2, F2=2, F1(xF1a)=1, F1a1(xF1a1a)=1, F1a1a=1, F3=1, F4=1
Lowland Yao (Fuchuan, Guangxi)	0.286	42		F2a=4, F1a1(xF1a1a)=2, F1a(xF1a1)=2, F1b=1, F1c=1, F1(xF1a, F1b, F1c)=1, F3=1
Xiban Yao (Fangcheng, Guangxi)	0.273	11		F1b=1, F1a(xF1a1)=1, F(xF1, F2a, F3)=1
Lanten Yao (Tianlin, Guangxi)	0.269	26		F1a(xF1a1)=5, F1a1(xF1a1a)=1, F(xF1, F2a, F3)=1
Bai (Xishuangbanna, Yunnan)	0.263	19		F1a=2, F1b=2, F(xF1a, F1b, F1c, F2a)=1
Huatou Yao (Fangcheng, Guangxi)	0.263	19		F1a1a=2, F1a1(xF1a1a)=1, F1a(xF1a1)=1, F(xF1, F2a, F3)=1
Vietnamese	0.262	42		F1a=10, F(xF1a, F1b, F1c, F2)=1
Taiwan (aborigines)	0.253	640		F4=72, F3=54, F1a1(xF1a1a)=21, F1a(xF1a1)=14, F2=1
Bai (Dali, Yunnan)	0.250	68		F1a=6, F1c=4, F2a=4, F1b=2, F(xF1a, F1b, F1c, F2a)=1
Indonesian (Mataram, Lombok)	0.250	44		F1a1a=4, F1a(xF1a1, F1a3, F1a4, F1a5)=4, F1a3=1, F1a4=1, F(xF1a, F1b, F2, F3a, F3b, F4)=1
Uyghur (Uzbekistan/Kyrgyzstan)	0.250	16		F=4
Yi (Xishuangbanna, Yunnan)	0.250	16		F1b=2, F1a=1, F2a=1
Khakassian (Khakassia)	0.246	57		F1=11, F2a=3
Naxi (Lijiang, Yunnan)	0.244	45		F1a=8, F1b=2, F2a=1
Bunu (Dahua & Tianlin, Guangxi)	0.240	25		F1b=2, F(xF1, F2a, F3)=1, F1a1(xF1a1a)=1, F1a1a=1, F3=1
Ket	0.237	38		F=9
Han (Beijing)	0.225	40		F1a=4, F(xF1a, F1b, F1c, F2)=3, F1b=2
Taiwanese (Taipei, Taiwan)	0.220	91		F=20
Han (Southwest China; pool of 44 Sichuan, 34 Chongqing, 33 Yunnan, & 26 Guizhou)	0.219	137		F1a=15, F2=8, F3=7
Hani (Xishuangbanna, Yunnan)	0.212	33		F1a=6, F1b=1
Tibetan (Shigatse, Tibet)	0.207	29		F1a=5, F1b=1
Tujia (Yanhe County, Guizhou)	0.207	29		F1a=2, F1c=1, F2a3=1, F2b=1, F(xF1, F2)=1
Bapai Yao (Liannan, Guangdong)	0.200	35		F1b=3, F3=2, F1a1a=1, F1a(xF1a1)=1
Indonesian (Waingapu, Sumba)	0.200	50		F1a4=3, F1a3=2, F1a1a=2, F1a(xF1a1, F1a3, F1a4, F1a5)=1, F1a1(xF1a1a)=1, F3b=1
Manchurian	0.200	40		F(xF1a, F1b, F1c, F2)=3, F1a=2, F1b=2, F1c=1
Thai	0.200	40		F1b=8
Li (Hainan)	0.197	346		F1a1(xF1a1a)=30, F2=20, F1(xF1a)=4, F1a(xF1a1)=4, F1a1a=3, F3=3, F4=3, F(xF1, F2, F3, F4)=1
Han (Xinjiang)	0.191	47		F1a=2, F3=2, F1b=1, F1c=1, F2a2=1, F2a3=1, F4=1
Thailand	0.190	105		F1=18, F(xF1)=2
Lisu (Gongshan, Yunnan)	0.189	37		F2a=4, F1b=2, F1a=1
Han (southern California)	0.187	390		F=73
Oirat Mongol (Xinjiang)	0.184	49		F2(xF2a2, F2a3, F2b)=3, F1b=3, F1a=2, F2b=1
Dong (Tianzhu County, Guizhou)	0.179	28		F1a=4, F1b=1
Han (Taiwan)	0.175	1117		F=196
CHB (Han from Beijing Normal University)	0.174	121		F=21
Jino (Xishuangbanna, Yunnan)	0.167	18		F1a=2, F1b=1
Nu (Gongshan, Yunnan)	0.167	30		F2a=5
Gelao (Daozhen County, Guizhou)	0.161	31		F1a=3, F1(xF1a, F1b, F1c)=1, F(xF1, F2)=1
Nepal (Newar)	0.155			F1c1a = 2.4%, F1d = 12%, F1g = 2.4%, F2b1 = 1.1%
CHD (Han from Denver)	0.151	73		F=11
Filipino (Palawan)	0.150	20		F3b2=3
Indonesian (52 Pekanbaru, 42 Medan, 34 Bangka, 28 Palembang, & 24 Padang)	0.150	180		F1a1a=9, F1a(xF1a1, F1a3, F1a4, F1a5)=8, F1a5=3, F4=3, F1a3=2, F1a4=2
Kyrgyz (Uzbekistan/Kyrgyzstan)	0.150	20		F=3
Yi (Shuangbai, Yunnan)	0.150	40		F(xF1a, F1b, F1c, F2a)=2, F1a=2, F1b=2
Mongolian (Ulaanbaatar)	0.149	47		F1a=3, F1b=3, F2a=1
Borneo (89 Banjarmasin & 68 Kota Kinabalu)	0.146	157		F3b=9, F(xF1a, F1b, F2, F3a, F3b, F4)=4, F1a3=3, F1a4=3, F1a1(xF1a1a)=2, F1a(xF1a1, F1a3, F1a4, F1a5)=1, F1a1a=1
Indonesian (Bali)	0.146	82		F1a(xF1a1, F1a3, F1a4, F1a5)=5, F1a1(xF1a1a)=4, F1a1a=2, F(xF1a, F1b, F2, F3a, F3b, F4)=1
Hmong (Jishou, Hunan)	0.146	103		F1a1(xF1a1a)=4, F1a1a=3, F(xF1, F2a, F3)=3, F1a(xF1a1)=2, F1b=2, F3=1
Aini (Xishuangbanna, Yunnan)	0.140	50		F1a=6, F(xF1a, F1b, F1c, F2a)=1
Indonesian (Ambon)	0.140	43		F1a3=3, F1a4=2, F1a1a=1
Cun (Hainan)	0.133	30		F4=3, F1a1(xF1a1a)=1
Hui (Xinjiang)	0.133	45		F1b=2, F1c=2, F1a=1, F2a3=1
Batak (Palawan)	0.129	31		F1a3=3, F3b2=1
Yi (Luxi, Yunnan)	0.129	31		F1b=3, F(xF1a, F1b, F1c, F2a)=1
Mongolian (Khovd Province)	0.128	429		F(xF1e1a)=7, F1=3, F1a=2, F1a1=4, F1a1a(xF1a1a1)=4, F1a2=2, F1b=2, F1b1(xF1b1b)=5, F2=1, F2a=14, F2b1=4, F4a=7
Guoshan Yao (Jianghua, Hunan)	0.125	24		F1a(xF1a1)=1, F1b=1, F3=1
Tu Yao (Hezhou, Guangxi)	0.122	41		F1a1a=4, F1a(xF1a1)=1
Gelao (Daozhen County, Guizhou)	0.118	102		F1a(xF1a1)=4, F1b=3, F2(xF2a, F2b)=2, F3a=2, F3(xF3a)=1
Tibetan (Nagchu, Tibet)	0.114	35		F=4
Tibetan (Lhasa, Tibet)	0.114	44		F1a=2, F2=2, F1b=1
Filipino (Luzon)	0.113	177		F1a3=6, F1a4=6, F3b=5, F4b=2, F1a1a=1
Indonesian (Alor)	0.111	45		F1a4=3, F1a1a=1, F1a(xF1a1, F1a3, F1a4, F1a5)=1
Indonesian (Sulawesi, incl. 89 Manado, 64 Toraja, 46 Ujung Padang, & 38 Palu)	0.110	237		F1a4=12, F1a3=4, F1a(xF1a1, F1a3, F1a4, F1a5)=4, F1a1a=3, F1a1(xF1a1a)=1, F1a5=1, F1b=1
Tujia (western Hunan)	0.109	64		F(xF1a, F1b, F1c, F2a)=2, F1a=2, F1b=2, F1c=1
Cham (Bình Thuận, Vietnam)	0.107	168		F1a1a=10, F1(xF1a)=3, F1a(xF1a1)=3, F1a1(xF1a1a)=2
Tibetan (Shannan, Tibet)	0.105	19		F=2
Altai Kizhi (Altai Republic)	0.102	324		F1=25, F2=8
Dingban Yao (Mengla, Yunnan)	0.100	10		F1a(xF1a1)=1
Filipino (Visayas)	0.098	112		F1a4=7, F1a3=3, F3b=1
Korean (South Korea)	0.097	185		F1a=8, F1b=8, F2(xF2a)=2
Korean (Seoul National University Hospital)	0.097	1365		F=132
Altai people (Altai Republic)	0.095	726		F1=44, F2=25
Filipino	0.094	64		F1a3=3, F1a4=3
Mien (Shangsi, Guangxi)	0.094	32		F1a1(xF1a1a)=2, F1a1a=1
Tibetan (Tibet)	0.093	216		F1a=13, F1b=4, F2=3
Mongolian (Mongolia)	0.092	2420		F1a=55, F1b=71, F1c=13, F1(xF1d, F1e1)=33, F2=44, F3a=2, F4a=7
CHS (Han from Hunan & Fujian)	0.091	55		F=5
Altai (Altai Republic)	0.091	110		F=10
Mongolian (Khentii Province)	0.091	132		F1=1, F1a=3, F1b=5, F1c=2, F2b=1
Buryat	0.087	126		F1b=6, F1a=3, F(xF1a, F1b, F1c, F2a)=2
Tofalar	0.087	46		F1b=4
Uzbek (Xinjiang)	0.086	58		F2a3=2, F4=2, F1b=1
Tuvinian (Tuva)	0.086	105		F1=8, F2a=1
Korean (South Korea)	0.083	850		F1a(xF1a3)=7, F1a1=17, F1b1=19, F1(xF1c, F1d)=11, F2=14, F3a=2, F4a1a=1
Japanese (Tōhoku)	0.083	336		F=28
Mongol (New Barag Left Banner)	0.083	48		F1a=2, F1c=1, F2a=1
Pumi (Ninglang, Yunnan)	0.083	36		F2a=2, F1b=1
Tibetan (Diqing, Yunnan)	0.083	24		F1a=1, F1b=1
Korean (South Korea)	0.080	593		F=3, F1=7, F1ac=2, F1a=12, F1c=2, F1b=16, F2a=3
Korean (Ulsan)	0.079	1094		F=86
Korean (northern China)	0.078	51		F(xF1a, F1b, F1c, F2)=1, F1a=1, F1b=1, F1c=1
Daur (Hulunbuir)	0.076	209		F1a=2, F1a1(xF1a1a)=4, F1a1a1=1, F1b1(xF1b1b)=2, F1c1a=1, F2(xF2d)=5, F4a1b=1
JPT (Japanese from Tokyo)	0.076	118		F=9
Kazakh (Xinjiang)	0.075	53		F1b=3, F2(xF2a2, F2a3, F2b)=1
Chinese (Shenyang, Liaoning)	0.075	160		F=12
Danga (Hainan)	0.075	40		F1a1(xF1a1a)=1, F2=1, F3=1
Japanese (northern Kyūshū)	0.074	256		F=19
Tibetan (Nyingchi, Tibet)	0.074	54		F1a=2, F1b=2
Mongolian (Sükhbaatar Province)	0.073	246		F=1, F1a=5, F1b=8, F1c=3, F2i=1
Uyghur	0.073	55		F1b=2, F1a=1, F1c=1
Filipino (Mindanao)	0.071	70		F3b=2, F1a4=2, F1a3=1
Korean (Seoul & Daejeon, South Korea)	0.069	261		F1=12, F(xF1)=6
Tibetan (Chamdo, Tibet)	0.069	29		F1a=2
Semelai (Malaysia)	0.066	61		F1a1a=4
Japanese (Hokkaidō)	0.065	217	Asari 2007	F=14
Mongolian (Dornod Province)	0.065	370		F1(xF1c, F1d)=6, F1a=7, F1b=7, F2=4
Wuzhou Yao (Fuchuan, Guangxi)	0.065	31		F1a1(xF1a1a)=1, F3=1
Korean (South Korea)	0.064	203		F=13
Mongolian (Ulaanbaatar)	0.064	47		F1=3
Uyghur (Xinjiang)	0.064	47		F1b=2, F1a=1
Bashkir (Beloretsky, Sterlibashevsky, Ilishevsky, & Perm)	0.063	221		F=14
Dungan (Uzbekistan/Kyrgyzstan)	0.063	16		F=1
Japanese (Miyazaki)	0.060	100		F1b=3, F1a=2, F2a=1
Kazakh (Zhetysu)	0.060	200		F1=11, F2=1
Tharu (Chitwan, Nepal)	0.060	133		F1c=7, F1(xF1c, F1d)=1
Japanese (Gifu)	0.059	1617		F=96
Japanese (Tōkai)	0.057	282		F=16
Teleut (Kemerovo)	0.057	53		F1=3
Altai Kizhi	0.056	90		F1=3, F2a=2
Kalmyk (Kalmykia)	0.055	110		F1=6
Tibetan (Shannan, Tibet)	0.055	55		F1a=2, F2=1
Tibetan (Qinghai)	0.054	56		F1c=2, F1a=1
Japanese	0.052	211		F1b=9, F1a=2
Hmong (Wenshan, Yunnan)	0.051	39		F1b=1, F3=1
Kazakh (Kosh-Agach, Altai Republic)	0.051	98		F1=5
Karakalpak (Uzbekistan/Kyrgyzstan)	0.050	20		F=1
Tharu (Morang, Nepal)	0.050	40		F1c=1, F1d=1
Turkmen (Uzbekistan/Kyrgyzstan)	0.050	20		F=1
Korean (South Korea)	0.049	103		F1=5
Oroqen (Oroqen Autonomous Banner)	0.045	44		F1b=2
Yakut	0.043	117		F2a=3, F1b=2
Tuvan	0.042	95		F(xF1b)=3, F1b=1
Kyrgyz (Talas)	0.042	48		F1a=1, F1b=1
Tibetan (Nyingchi, Tibet)	0.042	24		F=1
Khamnigan (Buryatia)	0.040	99		F1=4
Iu Mien (Mengla, Yunnan)	0.037	27		F(xF1, F2a, F3)=1
Kazakh	0.036	55		F1b=2
Barghut (Hulunbuir)	0.034	149		F1=4, F2=1
Buryat (Buryatia)	0.031	295		F1=7, F2a=2
Ulch people	0.031	160		F1a=5
Tibetan (Zhongdian, Yunnan)	0.029	35		F2a=1
Kim Mun (Malipo, Yunnan)	0.025	40		F1a1(xF1a1a)=1
Uzbek (Uzbekistan/Kyrgyzstan)	0.025	40		F=1
Okinawa	0.025	326		F=8
Evenk (New Barag Left Banner)	0.021	47		F1c=1
Ainu	0.020	51		F1b=1
Evenk (53 Stony Tunguska basin & 18 Tugur-Chumikan)	0.014	71		F1b=1
Telenghit (Altai Republic)	0.014	71		F1=1
Tubalar	0.014	72		F1b=1
Evenk (Krasnoyarsk)	0.014	73		F1=1
Ulchi (Old & New Bulava, Ulchsky, Khabarovsk)	0.011	87		F(xF1b)=1
Mansi	0.010	98		F=1
Khanty	0.009	106		F1=1
Turkish people	0.004	773		F1b1+@152=1, F1b1e=1, F1b1f=1
Chukchi (Anadyr)	0.000	15		-
Bukharan Arab (Uzbekistan/Kyrgyzstan)	0.000	20		-
Crimean Tatar (Uzbekistan/Kyrgyzstan)	0.000	20		-
Iranian (Uzbekistan/Kyrgyzstan)	0.000	20		-
Kazakh (Uzbekistan/Kyrgyzstan)	0.000	20		-
Tajik (Uzbekistan/Kyrgyzstan)	0.000	20		-
Hindu (Chitwan, Nepal)	0.000	24		-
Nganasan	0.000	24		-
Buryat (Kushun, Nizhneudinsk, Irkutsk Oblast)	0.000	25		-
Kurd (northwestern Iran)	0.000	25		-
Andhra Pradesh (tribal)	0.000	29		-
Batek (Malaysia)	0.000	29		-
Mendriq (Malaysia)	0.000	32		-
Negidal	0.000	33		-
Temuan (Malaysia)	0.000	33		-
Yakut (Yakutia)	0.000	36		-
Tibetan (Deqin, Yunnan)	0.000	40		-
Tajik (Tajikistan)	0.000	44		-
Daur (Evenk Autonomous Banner)	0.000	45		-
Evenk (Buryatia)	0.000	45		-
Udege (Gvasiugi, Imeni Lazo, Khabarovsk)	0.000	46		-
Itelmen	0.000	47		-
Kyrgyz (Sary-Tash)	0.000	47		-
Korean (Arun Banner)	0.000	48		-
Jahai (Malaysia)	0.000	51		-
Nivkh (northern Sakhalin)	0.000	56		-
Mansi	0.000	63		-
Chukchi	0.000	66		-
Siberian Eskimo	0.000	79		-
Persian (eastern Iran)	0.000	82		-
Koryak	0.000	155		-

== See also ==
- Genealogical DNA test
- Genetic genealogy
- Human mitochondrial genetics
- Population genetics

== Sources ==
- Asari M, et al. (2007). "Utility of haplogroup determination for forensic mtDNA analysis in the Japanese population". Leg Med. 9 (5): 237–240. doi:10.1016/j.legalmed.2007.01.007. PMID 17467322.
