= Haplogroup D (mtDNA) =

Human mitochondrial DNA (mtDNA) haplogroup

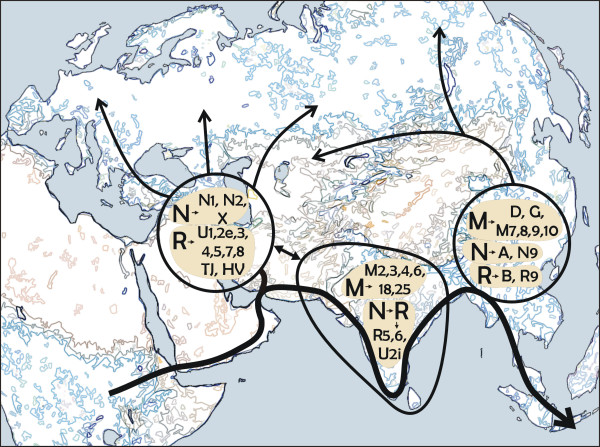
- Possible time of origin: ca. 60,000 – 40,000 YBP
- Possible place of origin: East Asia
- Ancestor: M80'D
- Descendants: D4, 16189
- Defining mutations: 4883 5178A 16362

In human mitochondrial genetics, Haplogroup D is a human mitochondrial DNA (mtDNA) haplogroup. It is a descendant haplogroup of haplogroup M, thought to have arisen somewhere in East Asia, between roughly 60,000 and 35,000 years ago (in the Late Pleistocene, before the Last Glacial Maximum and the settlement of the Americas).

In contemporary populations, it is found especially in Central and Northeast Asia. Haplogroup D (more specifically, subclade D4) is one of five main haplogroups found in the indigenous peoples of the Americas, the others being A, B, C, and X. Among the Nepalese population, haplogroup D is the most dominant maternal lineage in Tamang (26.1%) and Magar (24.3%).

== Subclades ==
There are two principal branches, D4 and D5'6. D1, D2 and D3 are subclades of D4.

=== D4 ===
D1 is a basal branch of D4 that is widespread and diverse in the Americas.

Subclades D4b1, D4e1, and D4h are found both in Asia and in the Americas and are thus of special interest for the settlement of the Americas.

D2, which occurs with high frequency in some arctic and subarctic populations (especially Aleuts), is a subclade of D4e1 parallel to D4e1a and D4e1c.

D3, which has been found mainly in some Siberian populations and in Inuit of Canada and Greenland, is a branch of D4b1c.

D4 (3010, 8414, 14668): The subclade D4 is the most frequently occurring mtDNA haplogroup among modern populations of northern East Asia, such as Japanese, Okinawans, Koreans, northern Han Chinese (e.g. from Lanzhou), and some Mongolic- or Tungusic-speaking populations of the Hulunbuir region, such as Barghuts in Hulun Buir Aimak, Mongols and Evenks in New Barag Left Banner, and Oroqens in Oroqen Autonomous Banner. D4 is also the most common haplogroup among the Oroks of Sakhalin, the Buryats and Khamnigans of the Buryat Republic, the Kalmyks of the Kalmyk Republic, the Telenghits and Kazakhs of the Altai Republic, and the Kyrgyz of Kyzylsu Kyrgyz Autonomous Prefecture. It also predominates among published samples of Paleo-Indians and individuals whose remains have been recovered from Chertovy Vorota Cave. Spread also all over China, the Himalayas, Central Asia, Siberia, and indigenous peoples of the Americas, with some cases observed in Southeast Asia, Southwest Asia, and Europe. Khattak and Kheshgi in Peshawar Valley, Pakistan

- D4* - China, Mongol from Heilongjiang and Hebei, Korea, Japan, Thailand (Lisu from Mae Hong Son Province), USA, Russia, Georgia, Iraq, Turkey, Greece

- D1 – America
  - D1a – Colombia
    - D1a1 – Brazil (Surui, Gavião)
    - D1a2 – Guaraní
  - D1b – United States (Hispanic), Dominican Republic, Puerto Rico
  - D1c – United States (Hispanic), Mexican
  - D1d
    - D1d1 – United States (Hispanic), Mexican
    - D1d2 – Mexican
  - D1e – Brazil (Karitiana, Zoró)
  - D1f – Colombia (incl. Coreguaje), Ecuador (Amerindian Kichwas from the Amazonian provinces of Pastaza, Orellana, and Napo), Peru, Mexican, USA
    - D1f1 – Venezuela, Brazil (Karitiana), Tiriyó, Waiwai, Katuena
    - D1f2 – Colombia
    - D1f3 – Mexico, USA (Native American)
  - D1g – Southern Cone of South America
    - D1g1
      - D1g1a
      - D1g1b
    - D1g2
      - D1g2a
    - D1g3
    - D1g4
    - D1g5
    - D1g6
  - D1h
    - D1h1 – Mexican
    - D1h2 – Mexican
  - D1i – Peru, Mexican, United States (Hispanic)
    - D1i1 – Mexican
    - D1i2 – Mexican
  - D1j – Southern Cone of South America (incl. the Gran Chaco in Argentina)
    - D1j1
      - D1j1a
        - D1j1a1 – Argentina
        - D1j1a2
  - D1k – Peru, Mexican, United States (Hispanic)
  - D1m – Mexican
  - D1n – United States (Hispanic), Mexico
  - D1r – Peru
  - D1u
    - D1u1 – Peru

- D4a – China, Mongol from Inner Mongolia and Heilongjiang, Northern Thailand (Khon Mueang from Chiang Mai Province and Lamphun Province, Phuan from Phrae Province), Laos (Lao from Luang Prabang), Japan, Korea, Kazakhstan, Uzbekistan (Tajik from Ferghana), Pakistan (Saraiki), Mongolia
  - D4a1 – Japan, Korea, Negidal, Ulchi
    - D4a1a – Japan
      - D4a1a1 – Japan, Korea
        - D4a1a1a – Japan
    - D4a1b – Japan, Korea
      - D4a1b1 – Japan
    - D4a1c – Japan, Korea
    - D4a1d – Japan
    - D4a1e – Mainland China, Taiwan, Dirang Monpa, Mongol from Shandong, Yakut
      - D4a1e1 – Japan, Uyghurs
    - D4a1f – Japan
      - D4a1f1 – Japan
    - D4a1g – China, Bargut
    - D4a1h – Japan
  - D4a2 – Japan, Korea
    - D4a2a – Japan, Korea
    - D4a2b – Japan
  - D4a3 Mongol from Tongliao
    - D4a3a
      - D4a3a* – found exclusively in Koreans, parts of Northeast China at low frequency
      - D4a3a1 – primarily found in Koreans, low frequency in Northern China
      - D4a3a2 – Japan (high), South Korea (low)
    - D4a3b
      - D4a3b* – China, Mongol from Shenyang
      - D4a3b1 – Japan, Korea, China（Korean from Yanbian Korean Autonomous Prefecture, China, Pakistan (Kalash)
      - D4a3b2 – Mainland China, Taiwan
  - D4a4 – Japan
  - D4a5 - Myanmar (Shan from Kachin State), China (Zhejiang, Chamdo, Korean from Antu County, Mongol from Tongliao)
  - D4a6 - China (Eastern China, Korean from Yanbian Korean Autonomous Prefecture), Mauritius
- D4a-b
  - D4a-b* – China (Han Chinese from Taizhou, Zhejiang)
    - D4a7
      - D4a7* – China
        - D4a7a
          - D4a7a* – Taiwan
            - D4a7a1 – Taiwan (Hakka Han from Neipu, Pingtung)
        - D4a7b
          - D4a7b* – Vietnam (Kinh from Ho Chi Minh City, Vietnam)
            - D4a7b1 – China (Souther Han Chinese from Hunan), Taiwan (Minnan Han from Kaohsiung and Tsou from Alishan, Chiayi), Vietnam (Kinh from Gia Lâm District, Hanoi) Singapore (Malaysian)
  - D4a8 – China
- D4b – Thailand (Thai from Central Thailand)
  - D4b1
    - D4b1* – Russia (Tuvan from Tuva Republic, Volga Tatar from Tatarstan), Kyrgyzstan (Kyrgyz), China (Uyghur, Mongol from Beijing, etc.)
    - D4b1a
      - D4b1a* – China (Bargut from Inner Mongolia, Mongol from Heilongjiang), South Korea, Thailand (Iu Mien from Nan Province)
      - D4b1a1 – South Korea, Japan
        - D4b1a1a – South Korea, Japan, Kyrgyzstan
      - D4b1a2 – Yukaghir, Neolithic Agin-Buryat Autonomous Okrug
        - D4b1a2a
          - D4b1a2a* – Hungary, Khamnigan, Han (Beijing)
          - D4b1a2a1 – China (Bargut, Uyghur), Mongol, Kazakhstan, Karakalpak, Azeri, Turkey, Poland, Russia (Buryats in Buryat Republic and Irkutsk Oblast, Tubalars, Ayon, Yanranay, Karaginsky District), Inuit (Canada, Greenland), Canada, Native American (USA)
          - D4b1a2a2 – Buryat, Todzhins, Tuvan
    - D4b1b'd
      - D4b1b - Mainland China, Taiwan
        - D4b1b1 – Japan
          - D4b1b1a – Japan
            - D4b1b1a1 – Japan
        - D4b1b2 – Japan, China (Han from Zhanjiang)
      - D4b1d – China (Gelao from Daozhen)
    - D4b1c
      - D3 – Oroqen, Buryat, Barghut, Yukaghir, Even, Evenk, Yakut, Dolgan, Nganasan, Inuit
        - D3* – Buryat, Yakut, Yukaghir (Lower Indigirka River, Chukotka, etc.), Nganasan (Vadei from the Taimyr Peninsula), Even (Severo-Evensk district, Sebjan, Sakkyryyr, Berezovka), Evenk (Taimyr Peninsula), Oroqen, Mansi
        - D3a – Bargut, Buryat, Evenk (Stony Tunguska)
        - D3b – Oroqen
        - D3c
          - D3c* – Buryat
          - D3c1
            - D3c1* – Nganasan (Avam from the Taimyr Peninsula)
            - D3c1a
              - D3c1a1
                - D3c1a1a – Agin-Buryat Autonomous Okrug (Neolithic Transbaikal), Bargut (modern Inner Mongolia)
                - D3c1a1b – Italy (Roman Empire)
              - D3c1a2 – Ust'-Dolgoe site of Glazkovo culture (Bronze Age Cis-Baikal), Onnyos burial near Amga River (Middle Neolithic central Yakutia)
        - D3d – Even (Tompo District of Yakutia, Lower Indigirka River)
        - D3e – Even (Tompo District of Yakutia)
  - D4b2 – Japan, specimen from 4256–4071 cal YBP (Middle Jōmon period) Yokohama, China (Mongol from Hebei), Thailand (Hmong from Chiang Rai Province), India (Gallong)
    - D4b2a – Japan
      - D4b2a1 – Japan, China (Korean from Antu County)
      - D4b2a2 – Japan, Korea
        - D4b2a2a – Japan, Kyrgyzstan
          - D4b2a2a1 – Japan, South Korea, China (Han from Dandong)
          - D4b2a2a2 – Japan
        - D4b2a2b – Japan
    - D4b2b – China (Mongols from Northeast China and Inner Mongolia, Uyghurs, Tu, Tibet, etc.), South Korea, Japan, Thailand (Khmu from Nan Province), Saudi Arabia
      - D4b2b1 – Japan, Korea, Buryat, Mongol from Tongliao, Uyghur, Persian
        - D4b2b1a – Japan
        - D4b2b1b – Japan
        - D4b2b1c – Japan
        - D4b2b1d – Japan
      - D4b2b2 – China (Mongol from Chifeng and Heilongjiang, Tujia, Han from Lanzhou, etc.), Taiwan (Hakka)
        - D4b2b2a – Mainland China, Taiwan, Vietnam (Lachi)
          - D4b2b2a1 – Japan, Russia
        - D4b2b2b – Russia, China, South Korea
        - D4b2b2c – China, Buryat
      - D4b2b3 – Japan
      - D4b2b4 – Northeast India (Sherdukpen), China, Russia (Tuvan)
      - D4b2b5 – Barguts, Buryat, Tibet, Taiwan
      - D4b2b6 – Chinese (Shandong, Beijing, Lanzhou, Denver), Korea, Mongolia, Kazakhstan, Armenian
      - D4b2b7 – Mainland China, Taiwan (Hakka)
      - D4b2b8 – Uyghur
      - D4b2b9
        - D4b2b9* – China, Xibo
        - D4b2b9a
          - D4b2b9a* – Buryat
          - D4b2b9a1 – China
    - D4b2c
    - D4b2d – Inner Mongolia (Bargut, Buryat)
- D4c
  - D4c1 – Uyghur
    - D4c1a – Japan, Korea
      - D4c1a1 – Japan, Tashkurgan (Kyrgyz)
    - D4c1b – Japan, Inner Mongolia
      - D4c1b1 – Japan, Tibet
      - D4c1b2 – Japan
  - D4c2 – Turkmenistan, Mongol from Chifeng
    - D4c2a – Uyghur (Artux), Russian Federation
      - D4c2a1 – Uyghur, Buryat, Bargut, Khamnigan, Ulchi
    - D4c2b – Yakut, Buryat, Bargut, Daur, Even, Uyghur, Kyrgyz, Kazakhstan, Turkey, Russia, Ukraine
    - D4c2c – Japan
- D4d – Japan, Korea

- D4e
  - D4e1 – Taiwan, Czech Republic (West Bohemia), Austrian, Finland, USA
    - D4e1a – Thailand (Mon from Nakhon Ratchasima Province), Moken, Urak Lawoi, China (Han from Lanzhou, Mongol from Inner Mongolia, etc.), Tibet, Uyghur, Korea, Japan
      - D4e1a1 – Japan, Chinese
      - D4e1a2 – Thailand, Sonowal Kachari
        - D4e1a2a – Japan, Korea
      - D4e1a3 – China (Yao from Bama, Mongol from Alxa, etc.), Thailand (Hmong, Iu Mien), Vietnam (Cờ Lao, Phù Lá)
    - D2 – Uyghur, Mongol from Jilin and Chaoyang
      - D2a'b
        - D2a – Aleut, Tlingit
          - D2a1 – Saqqaq, ancient Canada
            - D2a1a – Aleut
            - D2a1b – Siberian Eskimo
          - D2a2 – Chukchi, Eskimo
        - D2b – Yukaghir, Even (Maya River, Okhotsk Region), Mongol from Hulunbuir
          - D2b1 – China, Tibet, Kazakhstan, Kalmyk, Belarus (Tatar)
            - D2b1a – Buryat, Yakut, Khamnigan, Evenk
          - D2b2 – Evenk, Bargut
      - D2c – Buryat
    - D4e1c – Mexican
  - D4e2 – Japan, Korea, USA (African American)
    - D4e2a – Japan, Korea
    - D4e2b – Japan
    - D4e2c – Japan
    - D4e2d – Japan
  - D4e3 – Northeast Thailand (Black Tai, Saek), China, Mongol from Shenyang and Tongliao, Lachungpa
  - D4e4 – Yakut, Ulchi, Bulgaria, Poland, Russian Federation
    - D4e4a – Evenk, Even, Uyghur
      - D4e4a1 – Yukaghir, Evenk, Even, Mongol from Shenyang
    - D4e4b – Russian, Volga Tatar
  - D4e5
    - D4e5a - Xinjiang (Uyghur, Kyrgyz), Russia (Altai Kizhi, Buryat), Inner Mongolia (Bargut), Iran (Qashqai), Japan (Aichi)
    - D4e5b - Orok (Sakhalin), Even (Nelkan on the Maya River in the Okhotsk Region), Kyrgyz (Artux), Bashkortostan, Han Chinese (Lanzhou, Denver), Mongol from Fuxin and Heilongjiang
- D4f – Shor
  - D4f1 – Japan, Korea, Mongol (Bargut, Chifeng, Chaoyang, Hebei)

- D4g
  - D4g* – Japan, Korea
  - D4g1 – Japan, Korea, Uyghur, Uzbekistan
    - D4g1a – Japan
    - D4g1b – Japan, Taiwan, Mongol from Xinjiang, Belarus
    - D4g1c – Japan
  - D4g2 – China, Mongols in China (Fuxin, Hinggan, Tongliao, Xilingol)
    - D4g2a – Japan
      - D4g2a1 – China, Thailand (Mon from Lopburi Province), Mongols in China (Bargut, Beijing, Fuxin), Buryat, Khamnigan
        - D4g2a1a – Japan
        - D4g2a1b – China, Thailand (Black Tai from Kanchanaburi Province, Khon Mueang from Chiang Mai Province)
        - D4g2a1c – Thailand (Mon from Kanchanaburi Province and Ratchaburi Province), China, Wancho, Jammu and Kashmir
    - D4g2b – China, Buryat
      - D4g2b1 – Han Chinese, Ulchi
        - D4g2b1a – Japan

- D4h
  - D4h* – Thailand (Khmu from Nan Province, Htin from Phayao Province, Khon Mueang from Lampang Province), Philippines
  - D4h1
    - D4h1* – China
    - D4h1a - Korea, China (Liaoning Han)
      - D4h1a1 – Japan, Korea, China (Beijing)
      - D4h1a2 – Japan, Korea, China (Liaoning, Jilin, Tianjin, Shandong)
    - D4h1b
      - D4h1b-G10398A - China (Hunan Han, Zhejiang), Kyrgyzstan
      - D4h1b-A16241G - Japan (Tokyo, Aichi)
    - D4h1c – China (incl. Tu), Tibet
      - D4h1c1 – Japan, Korea, Mongol from Shenyang
    - D4h1d – Bargut
  - D4h2 – Ulchi
  - D4h3 – Thailand (Tai Yuan from Ratchaburi Province)
    - D4h3a – South America (Peru, Ecuador, Argentina, Bolivia, Brazil), Mexico, USA, and Colombia.
      - D4h3a1 – Chile
        - D4h3a1a – Chile
          - D4h3a1a1 – Chile
          - D4h3a1a2 – Chile
      - D4h3a2 – Chile, Argentina
      - D4h3a3 – Chile
        - D4h3a3a – Mexico, USA
      - D4h3a4 – Peru
      - D4h3a5 – Chile, Peru, Argentina
      - D4h3a6 – Peru, Ecuador
      - D4h3a7 – ancient Canada
      - D4h3a8 – Mexico
      - D4h3a9 – Peru
    - D4h3b – China
  - D4h4 – Uyghur, Tibet, Japan, Mongol (Bayannur, Hinggan)
    - D4h4a – Kyrgyz (Tashkurgan), Buryat, Bargut
- D4i
  - D4i* – Japan, Uyghur, Palestinian
  - D4i1 – Japan
  - D4i2 – Uyghur, Yakut, Dolgan, Kazakh, Volga Tatar, Buryat, Bargut, Evenk (Iengra), Even, Nanai, Yukaghir, Russia, Germany, England
  - D4i3
    - D4i3* – Nepal (Kathmandu)
    - D4i3a – Mainland China, Taiwan (Atayal)
  - D4i4 – Uyghur, Tibet (Sherpa), China (Miao), Vietnam (H'Mông)
  - D4i5 – Japan

- D4j – Tibet, Uyghur, Kyrgyz (Kyrgyzstan, Tashkurgan, Artux), Altai, Teleut, Tuvan, Buryat, Mongols in China (Bargut, Chifeng, Hohhot, Tianjin, Tongliao), Mainland China, Taiwan, Korea, Japan, Turkey, Italy, Czech Republic, Lithuania, Belarus
  - D4j1 – Thailand (Palaung from Chiang Mai Province), Uyghur
    - D4j1a – Bargut, Buryat, Khamnigan
      - D4j1a1 – Lepcha, Gallong, Lachungpa, Sherpa, Tibet, Lahu, Thailand (Lahu from Mae Hong Son Province, Mon from Ratchaburi Province, Lawa from Mae Hong Son Province, Tai Yuan from Uttaradit Province), Kyrgyz, Uyghur, Buryat, Bargut, Khamnigan
        - D4j1a1a – Gallong, Tibet
        - D4j1a1b – Toto
      - D4j1a2 – Tibet, Ladakh
    - D4j1b – Tibet, Wancho, Nepal, Thailand (Mon from Ratchaburi Province, Palaung and Khon Mueang from Chiang Mai Province), Kyrgyz (Tashkurgan)
      - D4j1b2 – Gallong
  - D4j2 – Lithuania, ancient Scythian (Chylenski), Yakut, Dolgan
    - D4j2a – Mansi, Ket, Yakut (Vilyuy River basin)
  - D4j-T16311C! – Italy, Ukraine, Lithuania
    - D4j3 – Russian Federation, Uyghur, Tibet, Mongol (Hulunbuir), Japan, Thailand (Mon from Ratchaburi Province)
      - D4j3a – China, Inner Mongolia (Mongol from Tongliao), Ulchi
        - D4j3a1 – Japan
      - D4j3b - Thailand (Lisu from Mae Hong Son Province), Tibet (Lhoba), Uyghur
    - D4j11 – Japan, Inner Mongolia (Mongol from Chifeng), Buryat, Hungary, Italy
  - D4j4 – Nganasan, Even (Maya River basin, NE Sakha Republic), Evenk (Nyukzha river basin, Iengra River basin)
    - D4j4a – Evenk (Okhotsk region, Sakha Republic, Iengra River basin), Even (Okhotsk region), Ulchi, Buryat, Yakut (Vilyuy River basin)
  - D4j5 – Italy, Austria, Czech Republic, Germany, Iran (Khorasan), Uyghur, Kyrgyz, Inner Mongolia, Buryat, Yakut, Yukaghir, Even (Sakha Republic), Evenk (Sakha Republic)
  - D4j-T146C!
    - D4j6 – China, Buryat, Dirang Monpa
    - D4j13 – Volga Tatar, Kyrgyz (Artux), Uyghur, Sherpa (Shigatse)
  - D4j7 – Tubalar, Mongol (Hinggan League)
    - D4j7a – Buryat, Bargut
  - D4j8 – China, Bargut, Buryat, Evenk (Sakha Republic), Yakut, Kazakh, Kyrgyz (Artux), Uyghur, Poland, Montenegro, Bosnia and Herzegovina, Serbia, Croatia, Austria, Scotland, Argentina
  - D4j9 – Bargut, Buryat, Khamnigan, Tuvan
  - D4j10 – Tubalar, Buryat, Bargut, Khamnigan, Kazakhstan, Turkey
  - D4j12 – Bargut, Buryat, Uyghur, Tatarstan, Belarus, Poland, Italy
  - D4j14 – Japan
  - D4j15 – China, Tibet, Mongols in China (Chifeng), Kazakhstan
  - D4j16 – China
- D4k'o'p
  - D4k – Japan, Korea, China (Qinghai, Kinh, etc.), Uyghur, Kyrgyzstan, Lithuanians
  - D4o – Teleut, Uyghur, Buryat
    - D4o1
      - D4o1* – Uyghur, Tubalar (Northeast Altai)
      - D4o1a – Japan, Buryat
      - D4o1b – Kyrgyz (Artux), Chelkan, Teleut, Khamnigan, Buryat (Buryat Republic), Han Chinese (N. China)
    - D4o2 – Bargut, Yakut, Evenk (Sakha Republic), Even (Kamchatka, Sakha Republic), Koryak, Ulchi, China (Han from Lanzhou)
      - D4o2* – Mongols in China (Bargut from Inner Mongolia, Mongol from Hinggan League, Mongol from Hohhot)
      - D4o2a – Manchu
        - D4o2a* – Uyghur, Yakut, Nganasan, Evenk (New Barag Left Banner), Even (Kamchatka), Koryak
        - D4o2a1 – Negidal, Hezhen, Uyghur, China
        - D4o2a2 – Yakut, Uyghur, ancient Yana River basin
        - D4o2a3 – Bargut (Inner Mongolia), Buryat (Zabaykalsky Krai)
  - D4p
    - D4p* – Altaian, Buryat
    - D4p1 – Japan
    - D4p2 – Buryat
- D4l
  - D4l1
    - D4l1a – Japan
      - D4l1a1 – Japan
    - D4l1b – Bargut (Inner Mongolia), Uyghur
  - D4l2 – Evenk (Nyukzha, Iengra, Taimyr), Yakut (Central, Vilyuy), Uyghur, Kazakh
    - D4l2a – Even (Tompo, Sebjan), Yukaghir, Mongol (Xilingol League)
      - D4l2a1 – Even (Sebjan, Sakkyryyr), Evenk (Taimyr), Yakut, Yukaghir
      - D4l2a2 – Evenk, Negidal, Yukaghir
    - D4l2b – China, Tibet (Lhasa)
- D4m
  - D4m* – Tubalar (Northeast Altai)
  - D4m1 – Japan
  - D4m2 – Mongolia, Mongols in China (Hohhot, Tongliao), South Korea
    - D4m2a – Nivkh, Ulchi, Yakut, Buryat, Evenk, Even, Yukaghir, South Korea, Japan (Chūbu-Hokuriku region - 0.1% of total; one Early Okhotsk culture specimen from the Hamanaka-2 site on Rebun Island), Austria (five Avar specimens from ca. 1200 (1150 - 1250) ybp Leobersdorf)
      - D4m2a* – Nivkh, Daur
      - D4m2a1
        - D4m2a1* – Evenk (Central Siberia)
        - D4m2a1a – Evens (two from Sakkyryyr and one from Tompo), Yukaghir
      - D4m2a2 – Nivkh
      - D4m2a3 – Yakut
      - D4m2a4 – Nivkh
      - D4m2a5 (D4m2a+A15847G) - Nivkh
      - D4m2a6 (D4m2a+A7430G) - HMSZper32 (specimen from ca. 950 [850 - 1050] years before present Bács-Kiskun, Hungary)
        - D4m2a6a (D4m2a6+C4676T) - Buryat, Khamnigan
    - D4m2b (D4m2+T8868C) – Tuvinian, Daur, Barghut (Inner Mongolia), Mongolia, Uyghur
  - D4m3 – Kyrgyz (Kyrgyzstan,Artux), Uyghur
- D4n
  - D4n* – Japan, Korea
  - D4n1
    - D4n1* – Japan
    - D4n1a – Japan
  - D4n2
    - D4n2a – China
    - D4n2b – Kyrgyz (Tashkurgan), Tibet, Bargut (Inner Mongolia), Buryat (Irkutsk Oblast)
- D4q – Taiwan, China, Mongols in China (Fuxin), Kyrgyz, Tajiks, India (Jammu and Kashmir), Germany, Poland, Netherlands, United States
  - D4q1 – Toto
    - D4q1a – Toto
  - D4q2 - Kyrgyz, India (Uttar Pradesh Upper Caste Brahmin)
    - D4q2a - Sherdukpen
  - D4q3 - Uyghur
  - D4q4 - Lhoba
- D4r – Thailand, Myanmar
- D4s
  - D4s1
    - D4s1* – Vietnam (Si La, Hà Nhì)
    - D4s1a – Vietnam (Hà Nhì)
  - D4s2 – Tashkurgan (Sarikoli, Kyrgyz)
  - D4s3 – Tibet (Lhasa), Uyghur, Tuvinian
- D4t – China, Korea, Japan
- D4u
  - D4u*
  - D4u1
    - D4u1* – Iran (Qashqai)
    - D4u1a – Tashkurgan (Sarikoli)
- D4v – Thailand
- D4w – Japan (Tokyo), Tu
- D4x – Peru (pre-Columbian Lima)
- D4y – Vietnam (La Chí)
- D4z – China

=== D5'6 ===
D5'6 (16189) is mainly found in East Asia and Southeast Asia, especially in China, Korea, and Japan. It does not appear to have participated in the migration to the Americas, and frequencies in Central, North, and South Asia are generally lower, although the D5a2a2 subclade is prevalent (57/423 = 13.48%) among the Yakuts, a Turkic-speaking group that migrated to Siberia in historical times under the pressure of the Mongol expansion.

- D5 - Taiwan (Paiwan)
  - D5a'b (D5-A9180G) - Korean, Tai Yuan in Northern Thailand
    - D5a - China, Korea, Japan, Buryat, Poland
      - D5a1 - Japan (TMRCA 7,300 [95% CI 3,300 <-> 14,200] ybp)
        - D5a1a - Japan
          - D5a1a1 - Japan
          - D5a1a2 - Japan
      - D5a2 - Gallong, Mongols in China (Baotou), Korea (TMRCA 12,500 [95% CI 8,900 <-> 17,100] ybp)
        - D5a2a - Russia (Tula Oblast, Buryat), Mongols in China (Heilongjiang, Hohhot), China, Japan (TMRCA 10,400 [95% CI 7,400 <-> 14,200] ybp)
          - D5a2a-T16092C - China, Korea
            - D5a2a1 - Mongols in China (Tongliao, Beijing, Chifeng, Fuxin, Hohhot, Shandong), China (Han from Lanzhou, etc.), Tibet (Monpa, Deng), Vietnam (Hà Nhì), Korea, Japan (Gifu), Buryat, Tuvan, Kazakh
              - D5-C16172T! - Burusho, Tubalar, Kumandin (Turochak), Todzhi (Adir-Kezhig), Buryat (South Siberia, Inner Mongolia), Wancho, Gallong, Monpa, Myanmar (Burmese from Pakokku), Thailand (Lawa from Mae Hong Son Province), China (Han from Fujian, Miao, etc.), Taiwan
                - D5a2a1a - Japan (Aichi, Chiba, etc.), China
                  - D5a2a1a1 - Japan (Aichi, etc.)
                    - D5a2a1a1a - Japan (Chiba, etc.)
                    - D5a2a1a1b - China (Uyghurs), Poland
                  - D5a2a1a2 - Japan (Gifu, Tokyo, etc.)
              - D5a2a1b - Sonowal Kachari, Gallong, China (Han from Zhanjiang, etc.), Tibet (Lhoba, Tingri, Deng), Kyrgyz (Artux), Mongols in China (Hohhot, Tongliao)
                - D5a2a1b1 - China, Taiwan (Minnan)
            - D5a2a2 - Japan (Aichi), Bargut, Buryat, Kyrgyz (Artux), Tibet (Shannan), Yakut, Dolgan, Yukaghir, Evenk (Iengra, Nyukzha, Taimyr, Sakha Republic), Even (Sakha Republic) (TMRCA 3,500 [95% CI 2,300 <-> 5,000] ybp)
        - D5a2b - Thailand (Iu Mien from Nan Province), Vietnam (Si La, Hà Nhì), Tibet (Deng, Sherpa), China (TMRCA 10,400 [95% CI 7,200 <-> 14,500] ybp)
      - D5a3 - Tibet, Mongol (Dalian), Korea, Japan (TMRCA 11,100 [95% CI 6,300 <-> 18,100] ybp)
        - D5a3a - Mongol (Hinggan League), China, Tibet, Finland
          - D5a3a1 - China, Uyghur, Ukraine
            - D5a3a1a - Finland, Norway (Saami), Russia (Veliky Novgorod, etc.), Mansi
        - D5a3b - China, Korea (Seoul)
    - D5b - Uyghur, China, Mongol (Chifeng)
      - D5b1
        - D5b1* - China, Uyghur, Mongol (Hulunbuir, Jilin, Tongliao)
        - D5b1a
          - D5b1a1 - Japan, Korea, China (Hubei, etc.)
          - D5b1a2 - Japan
        - D5b1b
          - D5b1b* - Japan, Korea, Mongol (Baotou, Chaoyang, Heilongjiang, Nanyang, Shanxi, Tongliao)
          - D5b1b1 - Japan, Korea, Uzbekistan
          - D5b1b2
            - D5b1b2* - Japan, Korea, Taiwan (Minnan), Uyghur
            - D5b1b2a - Uyghur
            - D5b1b2b - Uyghur
            - D5b1b2c - Kyrgyz (Kyrgyzstan)
          - D5b1b3 - Japan
          - D5b1b4 - China
        - D5b1c
          - D5b1c* - China (Han from Kunming)
          - D5b1c1 - China, Mongol (Chifeng), Taiwan, Philippines, Indonesia, Vietnam (Kinh)
            - D5b1c1* - Taiwan (Minnan, etc.)
            - D5b1c1a
              - D5b1c1a* - Taiwan (Amis, Puyuma, etc.), Indonesia (Manado), Chinese (Singapore)
              - D5b1c1a1 - Philippines (Kankanaey, Ifugao, etc.)
              - D5b1c1a2 - Philippines (Ibaloi)
            - D5b1c1b - China
          - D5b1c2 - Uyghur
        - D5b1d - Han Chinese (Beijing), Mongol (Ordos), Yakut
        - D5b1e - China
        - D5b1f - China
      - D5b2 - Japan
      - D5b3
        - D5b3* - Vietnam (Kinh, Tay), Thailand (Phuan), Laos (Lao), Taiwan (Minnan, etc.)
        - D5b3a - Taiwan (Paiwan, Rukai, Puyuma)
          - D5b3a1 - Taiwan (Rukai, Bunun, Paiwan, etc.)
        - D5b3b - Thailand (Shan from Mae Hong Son Province, Black Tai from Kanchanaburi Province, Tai Yuan from Ratchaburi Province), Vietnam (Kinh)
      - D5b4 - Thailand (Siamese, Hmong from Chiang Rai Province), Vietnam (Tay Nung, Cờ Lao, Tay, Kinh), Taiwan (Minnan, Makatao, etc.), China (Han)
      - D5b5 - Uyghur
  - D5c
    - D5c1 - Japan, Han Chinese (Beijing)
      - D5c1a - Japan, Taiwan (Minnan, etc.), China, Mongol (Tongliao), Uyghur, Tubalar, Kumandin (Turochak, Soltonsky District), Shor (Biyka, etc.), Kyrgyzstan (TMRCA 4,500 [95% CI 3,300 <-> 6,100] ybp)
    - D5c-T16311C! - Vietnam (Kinh), Mongolian, China
      - D5c2 - China, Japan
- D6
  - D6a - Philippines, East Timor
    - D6a1
      - D6a1* - Tibet, China, Korea, Japan
      - D6a1a - China, Japan
    - D6a2 - Taiwan (Atayal), Philippines
  - D6c - China (She people, Han from Zhanjiang), Taiwan (Minnan), Thailand (Phutai from Kalasin Province)
    - D6c1 - Philippines
      - D6c1a - Philippines (Maranao)

== Table of frequencies by ethnic group ==
Population	Frequency	Count	Source	Subtypes
Ban Ravat (Uttarakhand)	1.000	38		D4=38
Aleut (Commander Islands)	1.000	36		D2a1a=36
Orok (Sakhalin)	0.689	61		D(xD5)=41, D5=1
Aleut (Aleutian Islands)	0.656	163		D2a1a=107
Tibetan (Deqin, Yunnan)	0.550	40		D(xD5)=20, D5(xD5a)=2
Northern Paiute/Shoshoni	0.479	94		D=45
Uyghur (Uzbekistan/Kyrgyzstan)	0.438	16		D(xD4c)=5, D4c=2
Oroqen (Oroqen Autonomous Banner)	0.432	44		D(xD5)=14, D5(xD5a)=3, D5a=2
Subba (Limbu)	0.432	44		D4=19
Japanese (Hokkaidō)	0.415	217	Asari 2007	D4a=24, D4b=21, D4(xD4a, D4b, D4e, D4g, D4j)=21, D4e=11, D5=10, D4g=2, D4j=1
Japanese (northern Kyūshū)	0.414	256		D4b=26, D4(xD4a, D4b, D4e, D4g, D4j)=24, D4a=19, D4e=16, D5=10, D4g(xD4g1)=8, D4j=3
Japanese	0.412	211		D4(xD4b)=75, D5(xD5a)=10, D5a=1, D4b=1
Japanese (Tōkai)	0.411	282		D4b=34, D4a=26, D4(xD4a, D4b, D4e, D4g, D4j)=24, D5=14, D4e=13, D4j=3, D4g(xD4g1)=2
Northern Paiute	0.408	98		D=40
Japanese (Japan)	0.401	1928		D4=705, D5=68
Japanese (Tōhoku)	0.399	336		D4a=31, D4b=30, D4(xD4a, D4b, D4e, D4g, D4j)=29, D4e=17, D4g(xD4g1)=11, D5=10, D4j=4, D4g1=2
Korean (South Korea)	0.398	103		D4(xD2, D3)=33, D5=8
Mongol (New Barag Left Banner)	0.396	48		D(xD5)=16, D5(xD5a)=2, D5a=1
Dolgan (Anabarsky, Volochanka, Ust-Avam, and Dudinka)	0.390	154		D4l2=35, D3=8, D4e4a1=5, D4b1(xD3)=4, D4i2=2, D4j2=2, D4a=1, D2b1=1, D4m2=1, D5a2a2=1
Japanese (Japan)	0.389	672		D4 (xD4e, D4g, D4h)=111, D4a=42, D4b=79, D5=30
Okinawa	0.383	326		D4a=28, D4b=23, D4e=21, D4(xD4a, D4b, D4e, D4g, D4j)=18, D4j=12, D4g(xD4g1)=12, D5=7, D4g1=4
Tibetan (Nyingchi, Tibet)	0.375	24		D=9
Korean (South Korea)	0.364	261		D4(xD4a, D4b)=36, D4b=20, D4a=18, D5=14, D(xD4, D5)=7
Japanese (Tokyo)	0.356	118		D4=39, D5=3
Barghut (Hulunbuir)	0.356	149		D4(xD2, D3)=47, D2=3, D3=2, D5=1
Buryat (Buryatia)	0.349	295		D4(xD2, D3)=86?, D5=8, D3=7, D2=2
Buryat	0.348	419		D4(xD2)=134, D5=9, D2=3
Korean (Ulsan)	0.342	1094		D=374
Korean (South Korea)	0.340	203		D5=15, D4b=14, D4a=10, D4j=9, D4(xD4a, D4b, D4e, D4g, D4j)=8, D4e=7, D4g(xD4g1)=6
Khamnigan (Buryatia)	0.333	99		D4(xD2, D3)=25, D3=5, D5=2, D2=1
Korean (northern China)	0.333	51		D4(xD4a, D4b)=11, D4a=3, D5(xD5a)=2, D(xD4, D5)=1
Korean (Arun Banner)	0.333	48		D(xD5)=11, D5(xD5a)=5
Yakut (vicinity of Yakutsk)	0.329	164		D5a2a2=28, D4i2=9, D4c2=5, D4o2=4, D4j5=3, D4b1(xD3)=2, D4a=1, D4j8=1, D4l2=1
Korean (South Korea)	0.326	850		D4a(xD4a1, D4a2, D4a3)=64, D4b1=6, D4b2=36, D4e1=9, D4e2=17, D4f1=18, D4g1=16, D4j=12, D4(xD4g2)=49, D5=50
Korean (South Korea)	0.324	185		D4(xD4a, D4b)=44, D5(xD5a)=6, D5a=3, D4a=3, D4b=3, D(xD4, D5)=1
Yi (Luxi, Yunnan)	0.323	31		D(xD5)=8, D5(xD5a)=2
Korean (South Korea)	0.322	593		D=7, D4=93, D4a=30, D4b=30, D5=31
Evenk (New Barag Left Banner)	0.319	47		D(xD5)=12, D5(xD5a)=2, D5a=1
Evenk (Krasnoyarsk)	0.301	73		D4(xD2, D3)=13, D5=5, D3=4
Han (Beijing)	0.300	40		D4(xD4a, D4b)=5, D5(xD5a)=3, D5a=2, D4a=2
Japanese (Miyazaki)	0.300	100		D4(xD4a,D4b1,D4b2b)=16, D4a=5, D4b2b=3, D5a(xD5a2)=3, D4b1=1, D5(xD5a)=1, D5a2=1
Turkmen (Uzbekistan/Kyrgyzstan)	0.300	20		D4c=5, D(xD4c)=1
Yakut	0.299	117		D(xD5)=17, D5a=17, D5(xD5a)=1
Yakut (Vilyuy River basin)	0.297	111		D5a2a2=20, D4i2=4, D4c2=2, D2b1=2, D4b1(xD3)=1, D4e4a(xD4e4a1)=1, D4j2=1, D4j4a=1, D4o2=1
Iu Mien (Mengla, Yunnan)	0.296	27		D(xD5)=7, D5(xD5a)=1
Han (Southwest China; pool of 44 Sichuan, 34 Chongqing, 33 Yunnan, and 26 Guizhou)	0.292	137		D4(xD4a)=29, D5a=6, D4a=5
Nganasan	0.292	24		D3=4, D(xD1a, D2, D3, D5)=3
Kalmyk (Kalmykia)	0.291	110		D4(xD2, D3)=24, D5=6, D2=2
Nivkh (northern Sakhalin)	0.286	56		D(xD1a, D2, D3, D5)=16
Tibetan (Nagchu, Tibet)	0.286	35		D=10
Daur (Hulunbuir)	0.282	209		D4(xD4c, D4j, D4m)=42, D2b=1, D5=16,
Evenk (Ust-Maysky, Oleneksky, and Zhigansky)	0.280	125		D5a2a2=10, D4l2=8, D2b1=3, D4b1(xD3)=2, D3=2, D4c2=2, D4e4a1=2, D4j4a=2, D4j5=2, D4j8=1, D4o2=1
Chinese (Shenyang, Liaoning)	0.275	160		D5=16, D4(xD4a, D4b, D4e, D4g, D4j)=6, D4b=5, D4e=5, D4g(xD4g1)=5, D4j=4, D6=2, D4a=1
Hani (Xishuangbanna, Yunnan)	0.273	33		D(xD5)=6, D5(xD5a)=2, D5a=1
Lahu (Xishuangbanna, Yunnan)	0.267	15		D(xD5)=4
Kazakh (Kosh-Agach, Altai Republic)	0.265	98		D4(xD2, D3)=22, D5=4
Tubalar (Altai Republic)	0.264	144		D4b1a2a1=10, D4j=6, D4o=6, D4(xD4l, D4m)=9, D5c=7
Yakut (northern Yakutia)	0.257	148		D5a2a2=9, D4e4a(xD4e4a1)=6, D4j2=5, D4l2=4, D4i2=3, D5b1d=3, D4c2=2, D4j5=2, D3=1, D2b1=1, D4m2=1, D4o2=1
Nganasan (Ust-Avam, Volochanka, and Novaya)	0.256	39		D3a1=7, D6=2, D4a=1
Han (Xinjiang)	0.255	47		D(xD5)=9, D5a=2, D5(xD5a)=1
Kyrgyz (Sary-Tash)	0.255	47		D(xD5)=12
Nuu-Chah-Nulth	0.255	102		D=26
Han (southern California)	0.254	390		D(xD4a, D5)=53, D5=28, D4a=18
Manchurian	0.250	40		D4(xD4a, D4b)=8, D5(xD5a)=1, D5a=1
Even (Eveno-Bytantaysky & Momsky)	0.248	105		D4c2=5, D4l2=5, D4i2=3, D4j5=3, D5a2a2=3, D4m2=2, D4a=1, D3=1, D2b1=1, D4j4(xD4j4a)=1, D4o2=1
Tubalar (Altai Republic)	0.245	143		D4=28, D5=7
Teleut (Kemerovo)	0.245	53		D4(xD2, D3)=12, D5=1
Daur (Evenk Autonomous Banner)	0.244	45		D(xD5)=7, D5(xD5a)=2, D5a=2
Evenk (Buryatia)	0.244	45		D3=6, D4(xD2, D3)=4, D2=1
Han (Taiwan)	0.243	1117		D=271
Negidal	0.242	33		D(xD1a, D2, D3, D5)=8
Aini (Xishuangbanna, Yunnan)	0.240	50		D(xD5)=7, D5(xD5a)=3, D5a=2
Ainu	0.235	51		D(xD5,D6)=8, D5=4
Taiwanese (Taipei, Taiwan)	0.231	91		D5=11, D4a=5, D4b=2, D4(xD4a, D4b, D4e, D4g, D4j)=2, D4g(xD4g1)=1
Mongolian (Dornod Province)	0.230	370		D2b=6, D4a=7, D4b=12, D4(xD4e, D4o)=34, D4j=19, D5a=6, D5b=1
Darjeeling (general population)	0.227	66		D4=13; D5=2
Gelao (Daozhen County, Guizhou)	0.226	31		D(xD4b, D5)=6, D4b=1
Uzbek (Xinjiang)	0.224	58		D(xD5)=11, D5(xD5a)=2
Yakut (Yakutia)	0.222	36		D4(xD2, D3)=5, D2=1, D3=1, D5=1
Yukaghir (Upper Kolyma)	0.222	18		D5a1=3, D6=1
Tujia (western Hunan)	0.219	64		D(xD5)=9, D5a=4, D5(xD5a)=1
Ulchi	0.218	87		D(xD1a, D2, D3, D5)=13, D1a=4, D3=2
Han (Beijing Normal University)	0.215	121		D4=15, D5=11
Vietnamese	0.214	42		D4(xD4a, D4b)=7, D5(xD5a)=1, D5a=1
Mongolian (Khentii Province)	0.212	132		D4=1, D4b=4, D4e=3, D4g=3, D4h=2, D4j=2, D4m=1, D4o=8, D5a=4
Evenk (53 Stony Tunguska basin & 18 Tugur-Chumikan)	0.211	71		D(xD1a, D2, D3, D5)=13, D3=1, D5=1
Telengit (Altai Republic)	0.211	71		D4(xD2, D3)=15
Guoshan Yao (Jianghua, Hunan)	0.208	24		D(xD5)=4, D5(xD5a)=1
Mongolian (Sükhbaatar Province)	0.207	246		D1j=1, D4a=5, D4b=3, D4c=10, D4e=3, D4(xD4g, D4h, D4l, D4m, D4o)=11, D4j=11, D5a=5, D5b=2
Tibetan (Chamdo, Tibet)	0.207	29		D4(xD4a)=3, D5a=2, D4a=1
Tibetan (Shigatse, Tibet)	0.207	29		D4(xD4a)=4, D5a=2
Oirat Mongol (Xinjiang)	0.204	49		D(xD5)=9, D5(xD5a)=1
Kyrgyz (Xinjiang)	0.203	138		D4(xD4b,D4e)=20; D5=4; D4b=2; D4e=2
Siberian Eskimos	0.203	79		D2=12, D3=4 (4/8 Naukan, 7/25 Sireniki, 5/46 Chaplin)
Karakalpak (Uzbekistan/Kyrgyzstan)	0.200	20		D(xD4c)=4
Kyrgyz (Uzbekistan/Kyrgyzstan)	0.200	20		D(xD4c)=4
Ulch people	0.200	160		D4=18, D4o=13, D5=1
Nu (Gongshan, Yunnan)	0.200	30		D(xD5)=6
Buryat	0.198	126		D(xD5)=20, D5a=3, D5(xD5a)=2
Mongolian (Khovd Province)	0.198	429		D2b=1, D4a=1, D4b1=6, D4b1a2a1=4, D4b1c=4, D4b2a2a=6, D4b2d=8, D4(xD4c, D4e, D4g, G4h, D4m, D4o)=29, D4j=10, D5a1=1, D5a2a=11, D5b=4
Mongolian (Mongolia)	0.197	2420		D4b=76, D4c=68, D4j=64, D4(xD1, D2)=199, D5(xD6)=71
Gelao (Daozhen County, Guizhou)	0.196	102		D(xD5)=15, D5(xD5a)=3, D5a=2
Kazakh (Zhetysu)	0.195	200		D1=1, D4=32, D5=6
Tubalar	0.194	72		D(xD1a, D2, D3, D5)=10, D5=3, D3=1
Hmong (Jishou, Hunan)	0.194	103		D(xD5)=15, D5(xD5a)=3, D5a=2
Bai (Dali, Yunnan)	0.191	68		D(xD5)=9, D5(xD5a)=4
Mansi	0.190	63		D=12
Lowland Yao (Fuchuan, Guangxi)	0.190	42		D(xD5)=7, D5a=1
Khasi	0.190	368		D4=48; D(xD4, D5a)=22
Mizo	0.188	48		D4=9
Nyishi	0.188	48		D4=7; D5=2
Yi (Xishuangbanna, Yunnan)	0.188	16		D(xD5)=3
Tibetan (Nyingchi, Tibet)	0.185	54		D4(xD4a)=9, D5a=1
Poumai Naga	0.184	49		D4=9
Kazakh (Kazakhstan)	0.182	55		D(xD5)=9, D5(xD5a)=1
Hmong (Wenshan, Yunnan)	0.179	39		D(xD5)=6, D5(xD5a)=1
Han (Denver)	0.178	73		D4=10, D5=3
Yukaghir (Lower Kolyma-Indigirka)	0.171	82		D9=4, D8=2, D7=2, D5a1=2, D3a1=2, D3a2=1, D2(xD2a1a)=1
Sherpa (India)	0.167	54		D4=9
Pumi (Ninglang, Yunnan)	0.167	36		D(xD5)=6
Tujia (Yongshun, Hunan)	0.167	30		D(xD5)=3, D5(xD5a)=2
Yakama	0.167	42		D=7
Bhotia (Uttarakhand)	0.164	55		D4=9
Han (Hunan & Fujian)	0.164	55		D4=6, D5=2, D6=1
Uyghur (Kazakhstan)	0.164	55		D(xD5)=9
Khanty	0.160	106		D=17
Buryat (Kushun, Nizhneudinsk, Irkutsk)	0.160	25		D(xD1a, D2, D3, D5)=4
Bai (Xishuangbanna, Yunnan)	0.158	19		D(xD5)=3
Khakassians (Khakassia)	0.158	57		D4(xD2, D3)=9
Mien (Shangsi, Guangxi)	0.156	32		D(xD5)=5
Hui (Xinjiang)	0.156	45		D(xD5)=6, D5a=1
Altai (Altai Republic)	0.155	110		D=17
Tuvinian (Tuva)	0.152	105		D4(xD2, D3)=9, D2=3, D5=3, D3=1
Nogai (Daghestan)	0.152	33		D=5
Kim Mun (Malipo, Yunnan)	0.150	40		D(xD5)=6
Tajik (Uzbekistan/Kyrgyzstan)	0.150	20		D4c=2, D(xD4c)=1
Yi (Shuangbai, Yunnan)	0.150	40		D(xD5)=4, D5(xD5a)=1, D5a=1
Yi (Hezhang County, Guizhou)	0.150	20		D(xD4b, D5)=3
Zhuang (Napo County, Guangxi)	0.146	130		D4=13, D5=3, D(xD4,D5)=3
Kyrgyz (Talas)	0.146	48		D(xD5)=7
Bella Coola	0.143	84		D=12
Lahu (Lancang, Yunnan)	0.143	35		D(xD5)=5
Tuvan	0.137	95		D(xD1a, D2, D3, D5)=9, D3=3, D5=1
Tibetan (Lhasa, Tibet)	0.136	44		D4(xD4a)=5, D5a=1
Yukaghir (Verkhnekolymsky & Nizhnekolymsky)	0.136	22		D4j5=1, D4l2=1, D5a2a2=1
Chukchi (Anadyr)	0.133	15		D2=2
Kazakh (Xinjiang)	0.132	53		D(xD5)=7
Sema Naga	0.130	54		D4=7
Mongolian (Ulaanbaatar)	0.128	47		D4(xD4a, D4b)=5, D4b=1
Tibetan (Shannan, Tibet)	0.127	55		D4(xD4a)=5, D4a=1, D5a=1
Chakhesang Naga	0.127	55		D4=7
Altai Kizhi (Altai Republic)	0.126	324		D4=39, D5=2
Shor (Kemerovo)	0.122	82		D4(xD2, D3)=9, D5=1
Chukchi	0.121	66		D2=7, D3=1
Bunu (19 Bu Nu from Dahua & 6 Mu Bin from Tianlin)	0.120	25		D(xD5)=2, D5a=1
Kurd (northwestern Iran)	0.120	25		D4(xD2, D3)=3
Udmurt (Malo-Purginsky & Tatyshlinsky)	0.119	101		D=12
Karelian (Viena)	0.115	87		D5=10
Tibetan refugees in India	0.112	107		D4=9; D5=3
Sulawesi (89 Manado, 64 Toraja, 46 Ujung Padang, & 38 Palu)	0.110	237		D5=20, D(xD5)=6
Han (Taiwanese)	0.108	111		D4a=2, D5b1=2, D4b1b=1, D4b2b5=1, D4g2=1, D4j1a(xD4j1a1)=1, D4j6=1, D5(xD5a2a1, D5b)=1, D5a2a1=1, D5b(xD5b1)=1
Mongolian (Ulaanbaatar)	0.106	47		D4(xD2, D3)=5
Uyghur (Xinjiang)	0.106	47		D(xD5)=3, D5(xD5a)=1, D5a=1
Ao Naga	0.106	66		D4=5; D5=1; D(xD4,D5)=1
Kazakh (Uzbekistan/Kyrgyzstan)	0.100	20		D4c=1, D(xD4c)=1
Khasi	0.100	40		D4=4
Tharu (Morang, Nepal)	0.100	40		D4e1a=2, D4(xD4e1a, D4j)=2
Tatar (Aznakayevo)	0.099	71		D=7
Chuvantsi (Markovo, Chukotka)	0.094	32		D3a2a=2, D2a1a=1
Lahu (Simao, Yunnan)	0.094	32		D(xD5)=2, D5(xD5a)=1
Bashkir (Beloretsky, Sterlibashevsky, Ilishevsky, & Perm)	0.090	221		D=20
Tharu (Chitwan, Nepal)	0.090	133		D4(xD4e1a, D4j)=7, D4j=5
Altay Kizhi	0.089	90		D4(xD2, D3)=6, D3=2
Tibetan (Zhongdian, Yunnan)	0.086	35		D(xD5)=3
Mansi	0.082	98		D(xD1a, D2, D3, D5)=6, D3=1, D5=1
Lisu (Gongshan, Yunnan)	0.081	37		D(xD5)=3
Lanten Yao (Tianlin, Guangxi)	0.077	26		D(xD5)=1, D5(xD5a)=1
Hmong (Northern Thailand)	0.076	158		D4e1a3=9; D4e1a=1; D4b=1; D5b4=1
Thai	0.075	40		D(xD4, D5)=2, D4(xD4a, D4b)=1
Uzbek (Uzbekistan/Kyrgyzstan)	0.075	40		D(xD4c)=3
Tu Yao (Hezhou, Guangxi)	0.073	41		D(xD5)=3
Dong (Tianzhu County, Guizhou)	0.071	28		D(xD4b, D5)=2
Tibetan (Qinghai)	0.071	56		D(xD5)=4
Ambon	0.070	43		D(xD5)=2, D5=1
Tujia (Yanhe County, Guizhou)	0.069	29		D5=1, D(xD4b, D5)=1
Tajik (Tajikistan)	0.068	44		D4(xD2, D3)=2, D5=1
Turkmen (Afghanistan)	0.067	75		D4(xD4j)=4; D4j=1
Dungan (Uzbekistan/Kyrgyzstan)	0.063	16		D(xD4c)=1
Bapai Yao (Liannan, Guangdong)	0.057	35		D(xD5)=2
Jino (Xishuangbanna, Yunnan)	0.056	18		D5(xD5a)=1
Komi-Permyak (Komi-Permyak Autonomous District)	0.054	74		D=4
Taono O'odham	0.054	37		D=2
Taiwan aborigines	0.053	640		D5'6=26, D4=8
Apache	0.053	38		D=2
Tibetan (Shannan, Tibet)	0.053	19		D=1
Huatou Yao (Fangcheng, Guangxi)	0.053	19		D(xD5)=1
Li (Hainan)	0.052	346		D5'6=13, D4=5
Hazara (Afghanistan)	0.051	78		D4j=2; D4(xD4j)=2
Borneo (89 Banjarmasin & 68 Kota Kinabalu)	0.051	157		D5=7, D(xD5)=1
Iranian (Uzbekistan/Kyrgyzstan)	0.050	20		D(xD4c)=1
Karelian (Tver)	0.049	61		D5=2, D(xD5)=1
Tatar (Buinsk)	0.048	126		D=6
Thailand	0.048	105		D=5
Uzbek (Afghanistan)	0.047	127		D4j=2; D4(xD4j)=2; D5'6=2
Naxi (Lijiang, Yunnan)	0.044	45		D(xD5)=2
Hindu (Chitwan, Nepal)	0.042	24		D4(xD4e1a, D4j)=1
Tajik (Afghanistan)	0.041	146		D4(xD4j)=4; D4j=1; D5'6=1
Changpa	0.040	50		D4=1; D5=1
Chuvash (Morgaushsky)	0.036	55		D=2
Cun (Hainan)	0.033	30		D4=1
Wuzhou Yao (Fuchuan, Guangxi)	0.032	31		D(xD5)=1
Filipino	0.031	64		D5b=1, D6=1
Pan Yao (Tianlin, Guangxi)	0.031	32		D(xD5)=1
Filipino (Mindanao)	0.029	70		D6=2
Karelian (Aunus)	0.028	218		D5=6
Ket	0.026	38		D(xD1a, D2, D3, D5)=1
Tatar (Almetyevsky & Yelabuzhsky)	0.026	228		D=6
Persian (eastern Iran)	0.024	82		D4(xD2, D3)=1, D5=1
Lombok (Mataram)	0.023	44		D5=1
Filipino (Luzon)	0.023	177		D6=2, D5b=1, D(xD5b, D6)=1
Alor	0.022	45		D(xD5)=1
Cham (Bình Thuận, Vietnam)	0.018	168		D4=3
Turkish people	0.017	773		D4=1, D4c2b=1, D4e4=2, D4g1b=1, D4g2=2, D4j(xD4j6, D4j7, D4j12)=5, D4m2a=1
Mari (Zvenigovsky)	0.015	136		D=2
Koryak	0.013	155		D3=2
Bali	0.012	82		D5=1
Pashtun (Afghanistan)	0.011	90		D4j=1
Mordvinian (Staroshaygovsky)	0.010	102		D=1
Filipino (Visayas)	0.009	112		D6=1
Kiliwa	0.000	7		-
Seri	0.000	8		-
Dingban Yao (Mengla, Yunnan)	0.000	10		-
Xiban Yao (Fangcheng, Guangxi)	0.000	11		-
Cochimí	0.000	13		-
Filipino (Palawan)	0.000	20		-
River Yuman	0.000	22		-
Delta Yuman	0.000	23		-
Tibetan (Diqing, Yunnan)	0.000	24		-
Zuni	0.000	26		-
Pai Yuman	0.000	27		-
Batek (Malaysia)	0.000	29		-
Batak (Palawan)	0.000	31		-
Lingao (Hainan)	0.000	31		-
Nahua	0.000	31		-
Mendriq (Malaysia)	0.000	32		-
Temuan (Malaysia)	0.000	33		-
Jemez	0.000	36		-
Akimal O'odham	0.000	43		-
Java (incl. 36 from Tengger)	0.000	46		-
Tofalar	0.000	46		-
Udegey	0.000	46		-
Itelmen	0.000	47		-
Sumba (Waingapu)	0.000	50		-
Jahai (Malaysia)	0.000	51		-
Senoi (51 Temiar & 1 Semai, Malaysia)	0.000	52		-
Filipino	0.000	61		-
Semelai (Malaysia)	0.000	61		-
Komi-Zyryan (Sysolsky)	0.000	62		-
Navajo	0.000	64		-
Sumatra	0.000	180		-

== Famous members ==
- Ruth Simmons is a member of haplogroup D1.
- Comedian and actress Margaret Cho is in haplogroup D5a2a1b.

== See also ==
- Genealogical DNA test
- Genetic genealogy
- Human mitochondrial genetics
- Population genetics
- Human mitochondrial DNA haplogroups
- Genetic history of indigenous peoples of the Americas

Phylogenetic tree of human mitochondrial DNA (mtDNA) haplogroups

Mitochondrial Eve (L)

L0
L1–6

L1
L2

L3

L4
L5
L6
M
N

CZ
D
E
G
Q

O
A
S
R

I
W
X
Y
C
Z
B
F
R0

pre-JT

P

U
HV
JT
K
H
V
J
T
