= Haplogroup C (mtDNA) =

Human mitochondrial DNA haplogroup

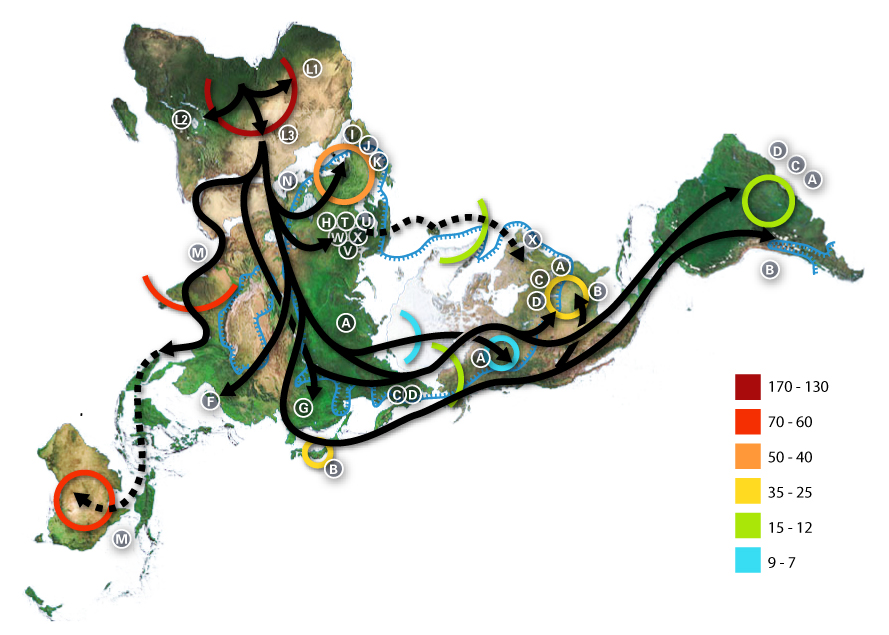
- Possible time of origin: 36,473.3 (SD 7392.0) years
- Coalescence age: 27,370 (95% CI 19,550 <-> 35,440) ybp 23,912.2 (SD 4780.8) years 21,700 (95% CI 19,200 <-> 24,400) ybp
- Possible place of origin: East Asia
- Ancestor: CZ
- Descendants: C1, C4, C5, C7
- Defining mutations: 489 10400 14783 15043

In human mitochondrial genetics, Haplogroup C is a human mitochondrial DNA (mtDNA) haplogroup.

== Origin ==
Haplogroup C is believed to have arisen in East Asia some 24,000 years before present. It is a descendant of the haplogroup M. Haplogroup C shares six mutations downstream of the MRCA of haplogroup M with haplogroup Z and five mutations downstream of the MRCA of haplogroup M with other members of haplogroup M8. This macro-haplogroup is known as haplogroup M8'CZ or simply as haplogroup M8.

== Distribution ==
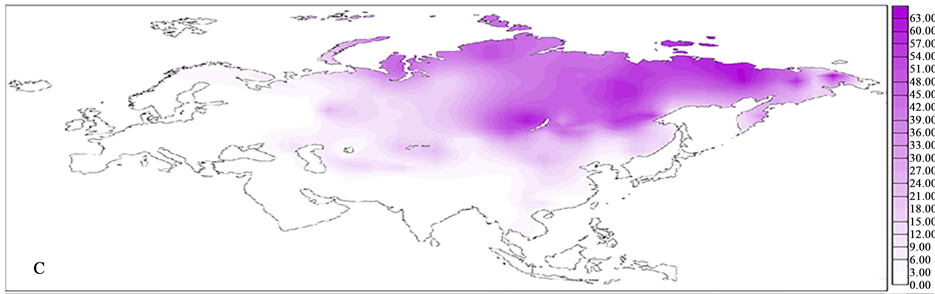
Frequency distribution of mtDNA haplogroup C in Eurasia

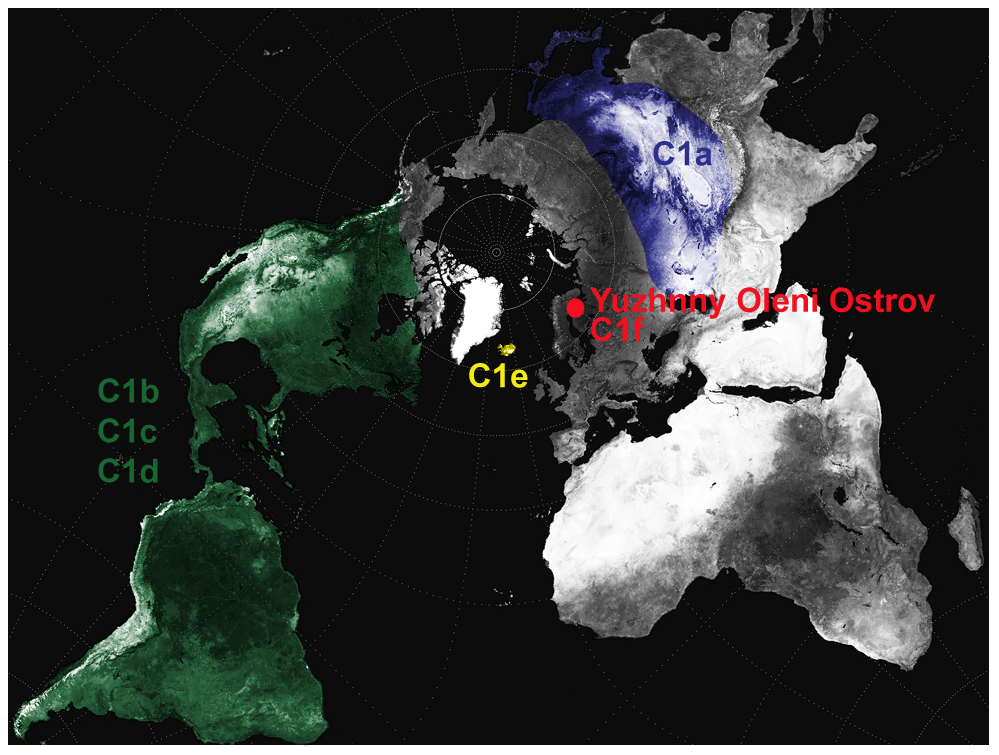
Approximate geographical distribution of the C1 sub-clades.

Haplogroup C is found in Northeast Asia (including Siberia) and the Americas. In Eurasia, Haplogroup C is especially frequent among populations of arctic Siberia, such as Nganasans, Dolgans, Yakuts, Evenks, Evens, Yukaghirs, and Koryaks. Haplogroup C is one of five mtDNA haplogroups found in the indigenous peoples of the Americas, the others being A, B, D, and X. The subclades C1b, C1c, C1d, and C4c are found in the first people of the Americas. C1a is found only in Asia.

In 2010, Icelandic researchers discovered C1e lineage in their home country, estimating an introduction date of year 1700 AD or earlier, indicating a possible introduction during the Viking expeditions to the Americas. A Native American origin for this C1e lineage is likely, but the researchers note that a European or Asian one cannot be ruled out.

In 2014, a study discovered a new mtDNA subclade C1f from the remains of 3 people found in north-western Russia and dated to 7,500 years ago. It has not been detected in modern populations. The study proposed the hypothesis that the sister C1e and C1f subclades had split early from the most recent common ancestor of the C1 clade and had evolved independently. Subclade C1e had a northern European origin. Iceland was settled by the Vikings 1,130 years ago and they had raided heavily into western Russia, where the sister subclade C1f is now known to have resided. They proposed that both subclades were brought to Iceland through the Vikings, however C1e went extinct on mainland northern Europe due to population turnover and its small representation, and subclade C1f went extinct completely.

In 2015, a study conducted in the Aconcagua mummy identified its mtDNA lineage belongs to the subclade C1bi, which contains 10 distinct mutations from C1b.

=== Table of Frequencies by ethnic group ===
Population	Frequency	Count	Source	Subtypes
Evenks (Stony Tunguska)	0.769	39	Duggan 2013	C4a2=7, C4a1c=6, C4b1=5, C5d1=4, C4b=3, C4b3=3, C4a1c1a=1, C5b1b=1
Evenk	0.718	71	Starikovskaya 2005	C(xC1, C5)=41, C5=10
Yukaghir	0.670	100	Volodko 2008	C(xC1, C5)=54, C5=13
Evenk (East)	0.644	45	Derenko 2007	C(xC1, C5)=17, C5=12
Tofalar	0.621	58	Derenko 2003	C(xC1, C5)=31, C5=5
Evens (Sebjan)	0.556	18	Duggan 2013	C4b=6, C4a1c=3, C5b1b=1
Yukaghirs	0.550	20	Duggan 2013	C4a1c=4, C4b3a=2, C4b7=2, C4a2=1, C5a2=1, C5d1=1
Yukaghirs (Yakutia)	0.545	22	Fedorova 2013	C4b3a=5, C5d1=3, C4a1c=1, C4a2=1, C4b1=1, C5a2a=1
Evens (Tompo)	0.519	27	Duggan 2013	C4a1c=6, C4a2=3, C4b=2, C4b1=2, C5d1=1
Nganasans	0.513	39	Volodko 2008	C(xC1, C5)=12, C5=8
Tozhu Tuvans	0.479	48	Derenko 2003	C(xC1, C5)=16, C5=7
Evenks (Yakutia)	0.472	125	Fedorova 2013	C4b1=13, C4a1c=11, C4b9=9, C4a2=8, C4b=5, C5b1b=4, C5a2=3, C5d1=2, C4a1=1, C4a1d=1, C4b3a=1, C5a1=1
Tuvans	0.472	231		C(xC1, C5)=88, C5=21
Yakut	0.469	254		C(xC1, C5)=95, C5=24
Evens (Berezovka)	0.467	15	Duggan 2013	C4b3a=4, C4b=1, C4b1=1, C4b7=1
Evenk (West)	0.466	73	Derenko 2007	C(xC1, C5)=29, C5=5
Evenks (Taimyr)	0.458	24	Duggan 2013	C4a1c=5, C4b1=4, C4a1c1a=1, C4a2=1
Yakut (Central)	0.457	164	Fedorova 2013	C4a1c=16, C4a2=14, C5b1b=13, C4b1=8, C4a1d=7, C4b=4, C4b1a=3, C5a1=3, C4a1=2, C5b1a=2, C4b3a=1, C5a2=1, C7a1c=1
Evens (Yakutia)	0.457	105	Fedorova 2013	C4a1c=15, C5d1=11, C4a2=4, C4b3a=3, C4b1=2, C4b7=2, C4b9=2, C4b=2, C5a1=2, C7a1c=2, C4b1a=1, C4b2=1, C5a2a=1
Evenks (Nyukzha)	0.413	46	Fedorova 2013	C4a2=10, C4b1=3, C4a1c=2, C4a1d=1, C4b1a=1, C5a2=1, C7a1c=1
Yakut (Northern)	0.405	148	Fedorova 2013	C4a1c=17, C4b1=16, C4a2=11, C5b1a=4, C5b1b=4, C4b9=3, C4b=2, C5a1=2, C5d1=1
Koryaks	0.400	15	Duggan 2013	C4b=3, C5a2=3
Dolgans	0.390	154	Fedorova 2013	C4a1c=33, C4b1=9, C5b1b=5, C4b3a=3, C4a2=2, C4b1a=2, C5b1a=2, C4b8=1, C4b=1, C5d1=1, C7a1c=1
Even	0.377	191		C(xC1, C5)=50, C5=22
Koryak	0.368	182		C(xC1, C5)=39, C5=28
Yakut (Vilyuy)	0.360	111	Fedorova 2013	C4a1c=14, C4a2=10, C4b=5, C4b1=4, C4b1a=2, C5a2=2, C5b1b=2, C4a1=1
Evens (Kamchatka)	0.333	39	Duggan 2013	C4b1=6, C4b3a=3, C4a1c=2, C5a2=1, C5d1=1
Altai-Kizhi	0.322	90	Derenko 2007	C(xC1, C5)=21, C5=8
Chuvantsi	0.313	32	Volodko 2008	C(xC1, C5)=10
Oroqen	0.295	44	Kong 2003	C(xC1, C5)=9, C5=4
Teleut	0.283	53	Derenko 2007	C(xC1, C5)=11, C5=4
Evens (Sakkyryyr)	0.261	23	Duggan 2013	C4a1c=2, C4b=2, C4a1d=1, C4b1=1
Udegey	0.226	31	Duggan 2013	C4b1=6, C4a1d=1
Mongolian (Ulaanbaatar)	0.213	47	Jin 2009	C=10
Buryat	0.212	419		C(xC1, C5)=66, C1=3, C5=20
Khakassian	0.208	110	Derenko 2003	C(xC1, C5)=28, C5=2
Barghut	0.201	149		C4a1a1=6, C4a1a2=3, C4a1b2=3, C4a2a1=2, C4b1a=2, C4b1=2, C4=2, C5b=2, C4a1a=1, C4a1a1a2=1, C4a1a2a2=1, C4a2a2=1, C5a1=1, C5a2=1, C5b1a=1, C7=1
Tubalar	0.194	72	Starikovskaya 2005	C(xC1, C5)=12, C5=2
Altaian	0.191	110	Derenko 2003	C(xC1, C5)=21
Evenks (Iengra)	0.190	21	Duggan 2013	C4a2=2, C4b1=1, C5a2=1
Udege	0.174	46	Starikovskaya 2005	C(xC1, C5)=8
Mongolian (Ulaanbaatar)	0.170	47	Derenko 2007	C4=4, C*(xC1,C4,C5)=3, C5=1
Telenghit	0.169	71	Derenko 2007	C(xC1, C5)=10, C5=2
Mongolian	0.153	150		C(xC1, C5)=18, C1=2, C5=3
Negidal	0.152	33	Starikovskaya 2005	C(xC1, C5)=3, C5=2
Kyrgyz (Kyzylsu)	0.145	138		C=20
Kyrgyz	0.140	200		C(xC1, C5)=18, C1=1, C5=9
Ulch	0.138	87		C(xC1, C5)=6, C1=1, C5=5
Turkmen	0.135	178		C(xC1, C5)=14, C5=10
Chukchi	0.132	417		C(xC1, C5)=27 C5=28
Kazakh (Xinjiang)	0.132	53	Yao 2004	C(xC1, C5)=5 C5=2
Itelmen	0.130	46	Schurr 1999	C5=6
Shor	0.122	82	Derenko 2007	C(xC1, C5)=9 C5=1
Orok	0.115	61	Bermisheva 2005	C1=7
Kyrgyz (Taxkorgan)	0.103	68	Peng 2017	C4=6, C5=1
Thai	0.100	40	Jin 2009	C=4
Nanai	0.094	85	Tamm 2007	C(xC1, C5)=5, C1=1, C5=2
Kazakh	0.086	511		C(xC1, C5)=32, C1=4, C5=8
Jetisu Kazakhstan	0.085	200		C4=11, C5=5, C7=1
Mongolian (Inner Mongolia)	0.083	97		C(xC1, C5)=5
Altaian (Kazakhstan)	0.082	98		C(xC1, C5)=8
Kyrgyz (Artux)	0.074	54	Peng 2017	C4=4
Tajik	0.073	82	Derenko 2007	C(xC1, C5)=6
Sarikoli	0.070	86	Peng 2017	C4a1a+A14878G=2, C4a1=2, C4b1=1, C4+T152C!+T4742C+T8602C=1
Daur	0.066	45	Kong 2003	C(xC1, C5)=2, C1=1
Uyghur (Xinjiang)	0.064	47	Yao 2004	C(xC1, C5)=3
Uzbek	0.061	130	Quintana-Murci 2004	C(xC1, C5)=6, C5=2
Vietnamese	0.048	42	Jin 2009	C=2
Han Chinese	0.045	1930		C(xC1, C5)=72, C5=15
Thai	0.034	552		C(xC1, C5)=19
Korean (mostly Ulsan)	0.030	1094		C=33
Manchu	0.025	40	Jin 2009	C=1
Korean	0.024	694		C=17
Korean (China)	0.020	51	Jin 2009	C=1
Korean (Korea)	0.016	185	Jin 2009	C=3
Korean	0.015	537	Tanaka 2004	C5=4, C(xC1,C5)=4
Korean	0.010	103	Derenko 2007	C(xC1,C4,C5)=1
Eskimo	0.008	254		C(xC1, C5)=2
Japanese	0.005	1312	Tanaka 2004	C1=4, C5=1, C(xC1,C5)=1
Japanese (Tokyo)	0.000	118	Zheng 2011	-
Ainu	0.000	51		-
Nivkh	0.000	38	Duggan 2013	-
Han (Beijing)	0.000	40	Jin 2009	-
Nivkh	0.000	56	Starikovskaya 2005	-

== Subclades ==
=== Tree ===
This phylogenetic tree of haplogroup C subclades is based on the paper by Mannis van Oven and Manfred Kayser Updated comprehensive phylogenetic tree of global human mitochondrial DNA variation and subsequent published research.

- CZ
  - C - China (Mongol from Chifeng), Korea, Russia (Bashkortostan), India
    - C1 - Paraguay (Alto Parana), ancient DNA from specimen I0061 (from Yuzhniy Oleni Ostrov, Lake Onega, Russia, 7450 - 6950 ybp)
      - C1a
        - C1a* – Ulchi, Nanai, Daur, Mongol (Hulunbuir)
        - C1a1 – Buryat, Kyrgyz (Kyrgyzstan)
        - C1a2 – Japan
      - C1b
        - C1b*
        - C1b1
          - C1b1*
          - C1b1a
            - C1b1a* – Mexican American
            - C1b1a1 – Mexican American
          - C1b1b – Native American, Mexican American
        - C1b2
          - C1b2* – Peru, Paraguay
          - C1b2a – Peru
          - C1b2b – Colombia
          - C1b2c
            - C1b2c* – USA, Puerto Rico, Paraguay, Spain
            - C1b2c1 – Paraguay
        - C1b3
          - C1b3* – Peru
          - C1b3a - Indonesia (Java, Borneo, Sumatera, Papua Nugini dan Sulawesi)
            - C1b3a* – Peru
            - C1b3a1 – Argentina
        - C1b4 – Ecuador, Peru, USA
        - C1b5
      - C1c
        - C1c1
        - C1c2
      - C1d – Argentina (Buenos Aires), Colombia (Boyacá), Mexico (Tamaulipas, Guanajuato, Chihuahua, etc.), United States (Mexican Americans), Canada (Shuswap)
        - C1d1
        - C1d2 – Colombia (Mestizo)
          - C1d2a – Colombia (Mestizos)
      - C1e – Iceland
      - C1f – Pamiri Tajik (Gorno-Badakhshan), India (Marathi), Scotland, Italy, Mesolithic NW Russia
      - C1g – Mesolithic NW Russia (Karelia)
    - C4 – Upper Palaeolithic (14050 - 13770 ybp) Ust-Kyakhta (Buryatia), Late Neolithic-Bronze Age Irkutsk Oblast, Late Neolithic-Iron Age Yakutia, Tubalar (Ederbes), Todzhin (Toora-Hem, Iiy, Adir-Kezhig), Yukaghir (Andrushkino), Yukaghir/Chuvan (Markovo), Russian, Myanmar
      - C4a'b'c - Irkutsk Oblast (6815 ybp), India (Jenu Kuruba)
        - C4a – China (Guangdong, Han from Beijing)
          - C4a1 – Mongol from Chifeng and Hulunbuir, Tashkurgan (Kyrgyz, Sarikoli, Wakhi), Czech Republic, Denmark
            - C4a1a – Korea, China, Uyghur, Buryat (South Siberia), Denmark, Sweden, France, Scotland, Canada
              - C4a1a1
                - C4a1a1a
                  - C4a1a1a1 - Lepcha, Sherpa (Nepal)
                  - C4a1a1a2 - Lachungpa
                  - C4a1a1a3 - Wancho
                - C4a1a1b - Poland, Finland (Hamina)
              - C-T195C! – Ireland, Scotland, England, USA, Hungary (Szeged region), Poland, Belarus, Russia (Russian, Buryat), Turkey, Pakistan (Hazara), India (Jammu and Kashmir), China (Bargut and Mongol in Inner Mongolia, etc.), Korea
                - C4a1a2 – China
                  - C4a1a2a – China (Han from Ili, Han from Henan, etc.)
                  - C4a1a2b
                    - C4a1a2b1 - China
                    - C4a1a2b2 - Uyghur
                - C4a1a3 – Bronze Age Irkutsk Oblast (Ust'-Belaya, Khaptsagai, Silinskij, Chastaja Padi), Russian (Kemerovo Oblast), Koryak, Yukaghir, Yakut, Evenk (Nyukzha, Chumikan, Nelkan/Dzhigda), Even (Sakkyryyr, Sebjan, Tompo, Markovo, Kamchatka), Udinsk Buryat (Kushun), Todzhin (Toora-Hem, Adir-Kezhig), Altai Kizhi, Iran (Qashqai), Sweden
                  - C4a1a3a – Yakut, Buryat (Buryat Republic, Irkutsk Oblast), Bargut, Nentsi
                    - C4a1a3a1 – Yakut, Nganasan (Vadei of Taimyr Peninsula)
                      - C4a1a3a1a - Evenk (Taimyr, Stony Tunguska)
                      - C4a1a3a1b - Tofalar
                  - C4a1a3b – Bargut, Uyghur
                    - C4a1a3b1 - Chelkan, Tubalar
                  - C4a1a3c – Evenk (Taimyr Peninsula, Stony Tunguska)
                  - C4a1a3d – Yakut
                - C4a1a4 – Buryat, Kazakhstan
                  - C4a1a4a – Evenk (Okhotsk region), Shor
              - C4a1a5 – Teleut, Ladakh
              - C4a1a6
                - C4a1a6a - Russia (Bashkortostan, Khamnigan), Kyrgyzstan (Kyrgyz), Inner Mongolia (Bargut, Buryat)
                - C4a1a6b - Buryat (South Siberia, Inner Mongolia), Uyghur
              - C4a1a7 - Denmark
            - C4a1b – China, Thailand (Palaung)
            - C4a1c - Russia (Bashkortostan, Adygei), Iran (Azerbaijanian), China (Xibo, Mongol from Tianjin)
          - C4a2
            - C4a2a – Yakut, Evenk (Chumikan)
              - C4a2a1 – Bronze Age (2275 - 2040 cal BC) Irkutsk Oblast (specimen irk076 from burial 3 at the Shamanka 2 site, South Baikal), Shor, Chelkan, Teleut, Altai Kizhi, Yakut, Kazakh, Ket, Evenk (Stony Tunguska, Taimyr), Buryat (Irkutsk Oblast, Inner Mongolia), China, Korea
                - C4a2a1a – Yukaghir, Yakut, Evenk (Nyukzha, Iyengra, Nelkan/Dzhigda), Even (Tompo)
                - C4a2a1b – Evenk (Nyukzha), Yakut
                  - C4a2a1b1 - Evenk (Nyukzha)
                - C4a2a1c - China (Zhejiang, Uyghurs), Buryat, Todzhin (Iiy), Karanogay (Dagestan)
                  - C4a2a1c1 - Tofalar (Alygdzher, Nerkha, V. Gutara), Khamnigan
                  - C4a2a1c2 - Uyghurs
                - C4a2a1d - Uyghurs
                  - C4a2a1d1 - Udinsk Buryat (Kushun), Tofalar (V. Gutara), Evenk (Central Siberia)
                  - C4a2a1d2 - Evenk (Nelkan/Dzhigda), Evenk/Nivkh (Val)
                - C4a2a1e - Bargut (Inner Mongolia), Buryat (Irkutsk Oblast)
                - C4a2a1f - Buryat (South Siberia, Irkutsk Oblast)
                - C4a2a1g - Ket
            - C4a2b – Tibet, Korea
              - C4a2b1 – Wancho
              - C4a2b2 – China (Han from Beijing)
                - C4a2b2a – Tibet (Sherpa)
            - C4a2c – Bargut (Inner Mongolia)
              - C4a2c1 – India (Jenu Kuruba)
              - C4a2c2 – Lepcha
                - C4a2c2a – Ladakh
        - C4b – Mongol from Jilin and Hulunbuir, Yukaghir, Altai Kizhi, Ukraine, Slovakia
          - C4b1 – Yukaghir, Buryat, Mongol from Jilin
            - C4b1a – Bargut (Inner Mongolia)
            - C4b1b – Evenk (Stony Tunguska), Buryat
          - C4b2 – Koryak
            - C4b2a – Koryak, Chukchi
          - C4b3 – Yakut, Altai Kizhi
            - C4b3a – Yukaghir, Even (Berezovka), Mongol from Xilingol
              - C4b3a1 – Yukaghir
            - C4b3b – Buryat, Evenk (Stony Tunguska)
          - C4b5 – Khamnigan, Buryat
          - C4b6 – Altai Kizhi, Tubalar
          - C4b7 – Yukaghir
          - C4b8 – Yakut
            - C4b8a – Nganasan
        - C4c – Ijka
          - C4c1 – Sioux (Carson County of South Dakota), Shuswap, Canada, USA, France, Spain
            - C4c1a – Cherokee (Flint District of Oklahoma)
            - C4c1b – Chippewa (Trempealeau in Wisconsin), Ottawa or Chippewa (Sault Saint Marie, Chippewa County, Michigan), Canada
          - C4c2 – Métis (Red River, Manitoba), USA
      - C4-T152C! – Russia (Bashkortostan), England
        - C4-T152C!-A12780G - Uyghur
          - C4d – Turkey, Tibet (Chamdo, Nyingchi, Shannan, Lhoba), Thailand (Khon Mueang from Chiang Mai Province), Han from Beijing, Mongol from Tongliao
        - C4-T152C!-T4742C - Altai Republic (ancient DNA), Uyghur
          - C4-T152C!-T4742C-T16093C - Kyrgyz (Kyrgyzstan), Tibet (Nyingchi)
          - C4-T152C!-T4742C-T8602C - Sarikoli (Tashkurgan), Burusho (Pakistan)
          - C4-T152C!-T4742C-T8602C-G11176A - Pamiri (Gorno-Badakhshan Autonomous Region of Tajikistan)
        - C4e – Teleut, Shor
    - C5 – India
      - C5a – Azeri
        - C5a1 – Mongol (Bayannur, Hohhot, Chifeng), Bargut (Inner Mongolia), Buryat (Irkutsk Oblast), Xibo (HGDP), Kazakhstan
          - C5a1a - Khanty, Altai Kizhi
          - C5a1b - Even (Severo-Evensk district), Ulchi
          - C5a1c - Yakut, Khamnigan (South Siberia)
          - C5a1d - Buryat (South Siberia, Inner Mongolia)
          - C5a1e - Uyghur
          - C5a1f - Uyghur
        - C5a2
          - C5a2a – Buryat (South Siberia, Buryat Republic), Turkey
            - C5a2a1 - Evenk (Nyukzha, Iyengra)
          - C5a2b – Yukaghir (Nelemnoye), Koryak, Chukchi, Evenk (Nelkan/Dzhigda), Even (Kamchatka)
            - C5a2b1 – Koryak
      - C5b – Poland
        - C5b1 – Mongol (Bayannur, Shanxi), Buryat (South Siberia), Tofalar, Todjin, Tuvan, Sojot, Ladakh, Japan
          - C5b1a – Evenk (Central Siberia)
            - C5b1a1 – Nganasan, Yakut, Buryat (South Siberia), Khamnigan (South Siberia), Kyrgyz (Tashkurgan)
              - C5b1a1a - Tofalar (Nerkha, Alygdzher, V. Gutara), Todzhi-Tuva (Alygdzher), Buryat (South Siberia)
            - C5b1a2 - Altai Kizhi (South Siberia), Irtysh-Barabinsk Tatar (Novosibirsk Oblast)
          - C5b1b – Khakas
            - C5b1b* – Buryat (South Siberia), Russia (Chechen Republic), Bulgaria (Turk in Dobrich)
            - C5b1b1 – Yakut
              - C5b1b1a - Yakut, Even (Sebjan), Evenk (Stony Tunguska), Russian
            - C5b1b2 - Uyghur
      - C5-T16093C – Japan (Aichi), Korea, Han (Beijing)
        - C5c – Tubalar, Teleut, Afghanistan, Persian (Iran), Czech Republic
          - C5c-C16234T – Kurd (Iran), Armenia, Turkey, Kuwait
            - C5c1 – Poland, Sweden, Greece
              - C5c1a – Russian (Uzbekistan), Ukraine, Lithuania, Poland, Slovakia, Austria, Germany, England, Scotland, Ireland, Italy, USA, Canada
        - C5d – China, Vietnam (Hmong)
          - C5d1 – Altai Kizhi, Tuvan, Evenk (Stony Tunguska), Yukaghir
          - C5d2 – Khamnigan, China
    - C7 – South Korea, China, Taiwan (Hakka), Thailand (Khon Mueang in Chiang Rai Province, Chiang Mai Province, and Lamphun Province), Vietnam (Kinh, Tay, Jarai)
      - C7a – Han (Beijing, Yunnan, Denver, etc.), Uyghur, Taiwan (Paiwan, Minnan), Lahu, Thailand (incl. Urak Lawoi, Lao Isan in Chaiyaphum Province, Khon Mueang in Lamphun Province, Khon Mueang in Lampang Province, Kaleun in Nakhon Phanom Province, Black Tai in Loei Province, Phuan in Suphan Buri Province), Vietnam (Hani, Yao, Gelao)
        - C7a1 – China, Mongol (Alxa), Taiwan (Makatao), USA (Han Chinese in Denver), Korea
          - C7a1a – Thailand (Mon in Lopburi Province)
            - C7a1a1 – Wancho
            - C7a1a2 – Dirang Monpa
          - C7a1b – Northern Thailand (Tai Lue), Vietnam (Nung)
          - C7a1c – Uyghurs, Mongol (Hebei, Tongliao, Hinggan, Hulunbuir), Chinese (Fengcheng, Shandong, Fujian, Taixing, etc.), Taiwan, Korea, Vietnam
            - C7a1c1 – Evenk (Central Siberia, Nyukzha River basin, Okhotsk region), Uyghur
          - C7a1d – Wancho
          - C7a1f – Thailand (Karen)
            - C7a1f1 – Thailand (Karen, Shan, Khon Mueang from Mae Hong Son Province, Mon from Kanchanaburi Province)
              - C7a1f1a – Thailand (S'gaw Karen, Khon Mueang in Chiang Rai Province)
        - C7a2 – China, Dai, Laos (Lao in Luang Prabang), Thailand (Khon Mueang in Chiang Mai Province, Khon Mueang in Chiang Rai Province, Lao Isan in Roi Et Province, Phutai in Sakon Nakhon Province, Mon in Nakhon Ratchasima Province), Myanmar (Yangon)
          - C7a2a – China (Shantou, etc.), Taiwan (Hakka, Makatao, etc.)
        - C7a3
        - C7a4
        - C7a5
        - C7a6
      - C7-A16051G – Bargut (Inner Mongolia)
        - C7b – Gallong, Naxi, Ukraine, Moldova, Austria
      - C7c – Korea
      - C7d – Taiwan (Hakka), Vietnam (Vietnamese), Thailand (Khon Mueang in Mae Hong Son Province, Lao Isan in Roi Et Province), Cambodia (Kampong Cham)
      - C7e – Cambodia (Takéo), Thailand (Khmer in Surin Province)

== Popular culture ==
- In his popular book The Seven Daughters of Eve, Bryan Sykes named the originator of this mtDNA haplogroup Chochmingwu.
- Cellist Yo-Yo Ma belongs to the mtDNA haplogroup C.
- Actor and film producer Adrian Grenier carries haplogroup C1b2.

== See also ==
- Genealogical DNA test
- Genetic genealogy
- Human mitochondrial genetics
- Population genetics
- Human mitochondrial DNA haplogroups
- Indigenous American genetic studies

Phylogenetic tree of human mitochondrial DNA (mtDNA) haplogroups

Mitochondrial Eve (L)

L0
L1–6

L1
L2

L3

L4
L5
L6
M
N

CZ
D
E
G
Q

O
A
S
R

I
W
X
Y
C
Z
B
F
R0

pre-JT

P

U
HV
JT
K
H
V
J
T

== Bibliography ==
- Gómez-Carballa, Alberto; Catelli, Laura (November 12, 2015). "The complete mitogenome of a 500-year-old Inca child mummy". Scientific Reports. 5 16462. Bibcode:2015NatSR...516462G. doi:10.1038/srep16462. PMC 4642457. PMID 26561991.
- Duggan, Ana T.; Whitten, Mark; Wiebe, Victor; Crawford, Michael; Butthof, Anne; Spitsyn, Victor; Makarov, Sergey; Novgorodov, Innokentiy; Osakovsky, Vladimir; Pakendorf, Brigitte (12 December 2013). "Investigating the Prehistory of Tungusic Peoples of Siberia and the Amur-Ussuri Region with Complete mtDNA Genome Sequences and Y-chromosomal Markers". PLOS ONE. 8 (12) e83570. Bibcode:2013PLoSO...883570D. doi:10.1371/journal.pone.0083570. PMC 3861515. PMID 24349531.
- Starikovskaya, Elena B.; Sukernik, Rem I.; Derbeneva, Olga A.; Volodko, Natalia V.; Ruiz-Pesini, Eduardo; Torroni, Antonio; Brown, Michael D.; Lott, Marie T.; Hosseini, Seyed H.; Huoponen, Kirsi; Wallace, Douglas C. (January 2005). "Mitochondrial DNA Diversity in Indigenous Populations of the Southern Extent of Siberia, and the Origins of Native American Haplogroups". Annals of Human Genetics. 69 (1): 67–89. doi:10.1046/j.1529-8817.2003.00127.x. PMC 3905771. PMID 15638829.
- Volodko, Natalia V.; Starikovskaya, Elena B.; Mazunin, Ilya O.; Eltsov, Nikolai P.; Naidenko, Polina V.; Wallace, Douglas C.; Sukernik, Rem I. (May 2008). "Mitochondrial Genome Diversity in Arctic Siberians, with Particular Reference to the Evolutionary History of Beringia and Pleistocenic Peopling of the Americas". The American Journal of Human Genetics. 82 (5): 1084–1100. doi:10.1016/j.ajhg.2008.03.019. PMC 2427195. PMID 18452887.
- Jin, Han-Jun; Tyler-Smith, Chris; Kim, Wook (2009). Batzer, Mark A (ed.). "The Peopling of Korea Revealed by Analyses of Mitochondrial DNA and Y-Chromosomal Markers". PLOS ONE. 4 (1) e4210. Bibcode:2009PLoSO...4.4210J. doi:10.1371/journal.pone.0004210. PMC 2615218. PMID 19148289.
- Yao, Y.-G.; Kong, QP; Wang, CY; Zhu, CL; Zhang, YP. (11 August 2004). "Different Matrilineal Contributions to Genetic Structure of Ethnic Groups in the Silk Road Region in China". Molecular Biology and Evolution. 21 (12): 2265–2280. doi:10.1093/molbev/msh238. PMID 15317881.
- Bermisheva, M. A.; Kutuev, I. A.; Spitsyn, V. A.; Villems, R.; Batyrova, A. Z.; Korshunova, T. Yu.; Khusnutdinova, E. K. (January 2005). "Analysis of Mitochondrial DNA variation in the population of oroks". Russian Journal of Genetics. 41 (1): 66–71. doi:10.1007/PL00022112. S2CID 264200417.
- Schurr, Theodore G.; Sukernik, Rem I.; Starikovskaya, Yelena B.; Wallace, Douglas C. (January 1999). "Mitochondrial DNA variation in Koryaks and Itel'men: Population replacement in the Okhotsk Sea-Bering Sea region during the neolithic". American Journal of Physical Anthropology. 108 (1): 1–39. doi:10.1002/(SICI)1096-8644(199901)108:1<1::AID-AJPA1>3.0.CO;2-1. PMID 9915299.
- Peng, Min-Sheng; Xu, Weifang; Song, Jiao-Jiao; Chen, Xing; Sulaiman, Xierzhatijiang; Cai, Liuhong; Liu, He-Qun; Wu, Shi-Fang; Gao, Yun; Abdulloevich, Najmudinov Tojiddin; Afanasevna, Manilova Elena; Ibrohimovich, Khudoidodov Behruz; Chen, Xi; Yang, Wei-Kang; Wu, Miao; Li, Gui-Mei; Yang, Xing-Yan; Rakha, Allah; Yao, Yong-Gang; Upur, Halmurat; Zhang, Ya-Ping (January 2018). "Mitochondrial genomes uncover the maternal history of the Pamir populations". European Journal of Human Genetics. 26 (1): 124–136. doi:10.1038/s41431-017-0028-8. PMC 5839027. PMID 29187735.
- Quintana-Murci, Lluís; Chaix, Raphaëlle; Wells, R. Spencer; Behar, Doron M.; Sayar, Hamid; Scozzari, Rosaria; Rengo, Chiara; Al-Zahery, Nadia; et al. (2004). "Where West Meets East: The Complex mtDNA Landscape of the Southwest and Central Asian Corridor". The American Journal of Human Genetics. 74 (5): 827–45. doi:10.1086/383236. PMC 1181978. PMID 15077202.
- Tanaka, Masashi; Cabrera, Vicente M.; González, Ana M.; Larruga, José M.; Takeyasu, Takeshi; Fuku, Noriyuki; Guo, Li-Jun; Hirose, Raita; Fujita, Yasunori; Kurata, Miyuki; Shinoda, Ken-ichi; Umetsu, Kazuo; Yamada, Yoshiji; Oshida, Yoshiharu; Sato, Yuzo; Hattori, Nobutaka; Mizuno, Yoshikuni; Arai, Yasumichi; Hirose, Nobuyoshi; Ohta, Shigeo; Ogawa, Osamu; Tanaka, Yasushi; Kawamori, Ryuzo; Shamoto-Nagai, Masayo; Maruyama, Wakako; Shimokata, Hiroshi; Suzuki, Ryota; Shimodaira, Hidetoshi (October 2004). "Mitochondrial Genome Variation in Eastern Asia and the Peopling of Japan". Genome Research. 14 (10a): 1832–1850. doi:10.1101/gr.2286304. PMC 524407. PMID 15466285.
- Zheng, Hong-Xiang; Yan, Shi; Qin, Zhen-Dong; Wang, Yi; Tan, Jing-Ze; Li, Hui; Jin, Li (6 October 2011). "Major Population Expansion of East Asians Began before Neolithic Time: Evidence of mtDNA Genomes". PLOS ONE. 6 (10) e25835. Bibcode:2011PLoSO...625835Z. doi:10.1371/journal.pone.0025835. PMC 3188578. PMID 21998705.
