= Barga (tribe) =

Subgroup of Mongols from east of Lake Baikal

- Location of Hulun Buir, home of the Barga since the 18th century

Regions with significant populations
- China: c. 100,000
- Mongolia: 2,989 (2010)

Languages
- Buryat (Barga dialect)

Religion
- Tibetan Buddhism, Shamanism

Related ethnic groups
- Other Mongolic peoples

The Barga (Mongolian: ᠪᠠᠷᠭᠤ; Барга; simplified Chinese: 巴尔虎部; traditional Chinese: 巴爾虎部; pinyin: Bā'ěrhǔ Bù), or the Barghut, are a subgroup of the Buryats that originated to the east of Lake Baikal in Siberia. The Barga migrated first into Outer Mongolia, and then further to Inner Mongolia and Manchuria, because of Russian expansions in Siberia and the Dzungar wars in the 17th century. In the early 18th century, the Qing dynasty resettled the Barga in the Hulun Buir region.

Today, most Bargas live in the three Barga banners in Hulun Buir, Inner Mongolia, China. Unlike the Buryats in Russia, the Barga are classified as ethnic Mongols in China.

== History ==
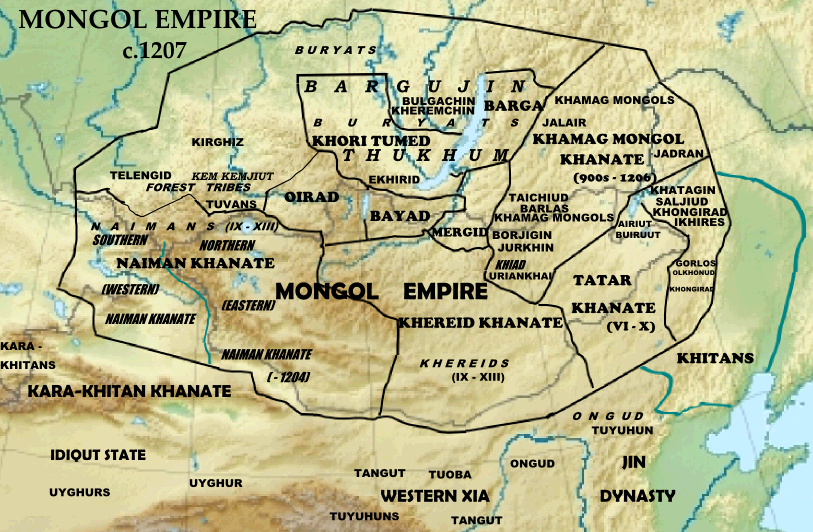
Mongol Empire c.1207, showing Bargujin-Tukum

In the 7–8th centuries, ancestors of Bargas, the Bayirku, a tribe of Tiele confederation appeared as tribes near Lake Baikal, named Bargujin. The Old Book of Tang recorded various names, including "拔野古", "拔野固", and "拔曳固". With regard to the Bayirku, alongside the Turkic version there are also hypotheses suggesting that they represented Mongolic elements within the Tiele confederation. The hypothesis of the Turkic origin of the Bayirku is shared by a number of researchers, such as N. A. Aristov, É. Chavannes, A. N. Bernshtam, B. R. Zoriktuev. The version of the Ancient Mongolic origin of the Bayegu/Bayïrku was first put forward in detail by G. N. Rumyantsev. The Mongolic hypothesis of the origin of the Bayegu/Bayïrku was supported by scholars Ts. B. Tsydendambaev, A. Ochir, P. B. Konovalov, S. B. Miyagasheva, G. Tubshinima.

The Barga gave its name to a historical Mongol name of the Baikal region – "Bargujin-Tukum" (Bargujin Tökhöm) – "the land's end", according to the conception of Mongol peoples in the 13th and 14th centuries.

Alan Gua, an ancestor of Genghis Khan, was of Barga ancestry. In the Mongol Empire, they served the Great Khans' armies. One of them named Ambaghai commanded the artillery. Manlaibaatar Damdinsüren and Khorloogiin Choibalsan were famous military commanders from Barga in the early 20th century.

=== Early history ===
The name Barga was first recorded in the Orkhon inscriptions.

During the 12th and 13th centuries, the Barga had a close relationship with the Khiyad, the tribe of Genghis Khan. Members of the two tribes frequently intermarried.

=== 14th to 17th centuries ===
After the fall of the Yuan dynasty in 1368, the Barga joined the Oirats against the Genghisids. However, they were scattered among the Mongols and Oirats. The Barga share the same 11 clans into which the Khori-Buryats were divided. The main body of Khori-Barga moved to the area between Ergune river and the Greater Khingan Range where they became subject to the Daurs and Solon Ewenkis. A large body of Barga Khoris fled back east to the Onon river in 1594.

In the second half of the 17th century, the Barga migrated into Khalkha territories to escape Russian expansion, along with many other Buryat tribes, and many became subjects of the Sechen Khan.

=== Qing dynasty period ===
Most Bargas fled south into Inner Mongolia in 1688 after the Dzungars attacked the Khalkhas. By the time of the Qing victory over the Dzungars in 1697, a part of the Barga tribe had migrated further into Manchuria, while the rest returned with the Khalkhas to Outer Mongolia.

Between 1730 and 1732, the Barags under Sechen Khan rebelled and defected to Russia. In 1732, 275 Barags from Manchuria were conscripted by the Qing into two of the Solon Eight Banners. They were relocated along with their families to Hulun Buir to become part of the defense army on the Russian border. This group was known as the "Old Barags". In 1734, the Russians returned the Barag defectors to the Qing, who were then resettled to Hulun Buir and became known as the "New Barags". The Qing reorganized the New Barags into Eight Banners in the same manner as the Solons.

In 1864, the 10 Barga banners in Hulun Buir had a total population of 3,055 households.

=== Modern history ===
In 1932, the Barag territories in Hulun Buir were reorganized into three banners: Old Barag Banner, New Barag Left Banner and New Barag Right Banner.

== Genetics ==
Derenko et al. (2012) tested blood samples of 149 unrelated Barghuts collected in different localities of Hulun Buir, Inner Mongolia, China. The mtDNA of the sampled Barghuts belonged predominantly to East Eurasian haplogroups, in particular D4 (52/149 = 34.9%), C4 (24/149 = 16.1%), and G2a (13/149 = 8.7%). Among the rarer mtDNA haplogroups of East Eurasian origin, B4c1a2 (5/149 = 3.4%) stands out for its being relatively common among the sampled Barghuts. A minority of the sampled Barghuts belonged to West Eurasian mtDNA haplogroups U (7/149 = 4.7%) and HV (5/149 = 3.4%).

The Y-DNA of Barghuts is similar to that of Buryats, with both populations bearing mainly haplogroups C-M407 and N-Tat. Malyarchuk et al. (2016) tested a sample of 76 Barghut males and assigned their Y-DNA to C-M407 (42/76 = 55.3%), N-Tat (21/76 = 27.6%), and C-M217 (xM407) (8/76 = 10.5%), with singletons belonging to haplogroups G-M201, J2a-M410, T-M70, O2-M122, and R2a-M124.

== Economy ==
=== 1907 statistics by Mairan Jangi Somonsurong ===
In 1907, there were over 1,764,457 domestic animals raised by Barga, including 170,172 horses, 124,398 cattle, 9,011 camels, 1,407,586 sheep and 53,290 goats.

New Barga took 76.8% of domestic animals and Old Barga took the rest.

=== Other records ===
Local folks have a lot of tales about Bayan Barga Rich families.

- Dimin Ogorda had 10,000 horses during the Qing dynasty period.
- Jingdi Jangi had 12,000 horses during the Japanese occupation period.
- Yorong Jangi had 20,000 sheep.
- Bosang Hafan had 1,000 white cows.

== Religion ==
The Barga are Tibetan Buddhists. They converted around the 17th and 18th centuries due to Mongol influence. However, shamanism still retains a significant influence in Barga beliefs and culture.
