= Haplogroup G =

Haplogroup G may refer to:

- Haplogroup G (mtDNA), a human mitochondrial DNA (mtDNA) haplogroup
- Haplogroup G (Y-DNA), a human Y-chromosome (Y-DNA) haplogroup
