= Haplogroup G (mtDNA) =

Human mitochondrial DNA haplogroup

- Possible time of origin: 35,700 YBP
- Possible place of origin: East Asia
- Ancestor: M12'G
- Descendants: G1, G2, G3, G4
- Defining mutations: 709, 4833, 5108

In human mitochondrial genetics, Haplogroup G is a human mitochondrial DNA (mtDNA) haplogroup.

== Origin ==
Haplogroup G is a descendant of haplogroup M. Haplogroup G is divided into subclades G1, G2, G3, and G4.

== Distribution ==
It is an East Asian haplogroup. Today, haplogroup G is found at its highest frequency in indigenous populations of the lands surrounding the Sea of Okhotsk. Haplogroup G is one of the most common mtDNA haplogroups among modern Ainu, Siberian, Mongol, Tibetan and Central and North Asian Turkic peoples (as well as among people of the prehistoric Jōmon culture in Hokkaidō). It is also found at a lower frequency among many other populations of East Asia, Central Asia, Bangladesh, Sri Lanka, and Nepal. However, unlike other mitochondrial DNA haplogroups typical of populations of northeastern Asia, such as haplogroup A, haplogroup C, and haplogroup D, haplogroup G has not been found among indigenous peoples of the Americas.

=== Table of Frequencies by ethnic group ===
Population	Frequency	Count	Source	Subtypes
Itelmen	0.681	47	Starikovskaya 2005	G1=32
Koryak	0.419	155	Starikovskaya 2005	G1=65
Chuvantsi (Markovo, Chukotka)	0.281	32	Volodko 2008	G1=9
Negidal	0.273	33	Starikovskaya 2005	G1=9
Tharu (Chitwan, Nepal)	0.233	133	Fornarino 2009	G2a=19, G(xG2a)=12
Kazakh (Uzbekistan/Kyrgyzstan)	0.200	20	Comas 2004	G2a=4
Ainu	0.196	51		G1=8, G2=2
Tibetan (Lhasa, Tibet)	0.182	44	Ji 2012	G2a=3, G3b=3, G2(xG2a)=2
Mongolian (Ulaanbaatar)	0.170	47	Jin 2009	G2a=5, G(xG1a, G2, G3)=2, G3=1
Korean (Arun Banner)	0.167	48	Kong 2003	G2(xG2a)=3, G2a=3, G1a=1, G3=1
Tibetan (Nyingchi, Tibet)	0.167	24	Ji 2012	G=4
Oirat Mongol (Xinjiang)	0.163	49	Yao 2004	G2a=3, G2(xG2a)=3, G(xG1a, G2, G3)=2
Tibetan (Shannan, Tibet)	0.158	19	Ji 2012	G=3
Yukaghir (Lower Kolyma-Indigirka)	0.146	82	Volodko 2008	G1=12
Kyrgyz (Talas)	0.146	48	Yao 2004	G2a=7
Tibetan (Shannan, Tibet)	0.145	55	Ji 2012	G2a=4, G2(xG2a)=3, G3b=1
Uyghur (Xinjiang)	0.128	47	Yao 2004	G2a=5, G3=1
Tharu (Morang, Nepal)	0.125	40	Fornarino 2009	G2a=4, G(xG2a)=1
Japanese (Gifu)	0.116	1617	Fuku 2007	G=188
Ulch	0.115	87	Starikovskaya 2005	G1=9, G2=1
Oroqen (Oroqen Autonomous Banner)	0.114	44	Kong 2003	G(xG1a, G2, G3)=5
Tibetan (Qinghai)	0.107	56	Wen 2004	G(xG2, G3)=2, G2a=2, G2(xG2a)=1, G3=1
Mongolian (Ulaanbaatar)	0.106	47	Derenko 2007	G2a=4, G1=1
Tuvan	0.105	95	Starikovskaya 2005	G2=6, G3=4
Huatou Yao (Fangcheng, Guangxi)	0.105	19		G2=2
Japanese	0.104	211	Maruyama 2003	G4a=12, G2a=6, G4b=2, G2(xG2a)=1, G(xG2, G4a, G4b)=1
Tibetan (Chamdo, Tibet)	0.103	29	Ji 2012	G3b=2, G2a=1
Tibetan (Shigatse, Tibet)	0.103	29	Ji 2012	G2a=2, G2(xG2a)=1
Korean (South Korea)	0.103	185	Jin 2009	G2(xG2a)=7, G2a=6, G3=4, G1a=1, G(xG1a, G2, G3)=1
Japanese (Tokyo)	0.102	118	Zheng 2011	G=12
Khamnigan (Buryatia)	0.101	99	Derenko 2007	G2a=9, G3=1
Han (Beijing)	0.100	40	Jin 2009	G2a=2, G2(xG2a)=1, G(xG1a, G2, G3)=1
Manchurian	0.100	40	Jin 2009	G1a=3, G2a=1
Tu Yao (Hezhou, Guangxi)	0.098	41		G2=4
Japanese (Tōkai)	0.096	282	Umetsu 2005	G1a=13, G(xG1a, G1b)=12, G1b=2
Even (Eveno-Bytantaysky & Momsky)	0.095	105	Fedorova 2013	G1b=9, G2a(xG2a5)=1
Barghut (Hulunbuir)	0.094	149	Derenko 2012	G2=13, G3=1
Chukchi	0.091	66	Starikovskaya 2005	G1=6
Xiban Yao (Fangcheng, Guangxi)	0.091	11		G2=1
Daur (Evenk Autonomous Banner)	0.089	45	Kong 2003	G1a=2, G2a=2
Hui (Xinjiang)	0.089	45	Yao 2004	G2a=2, G1a=1, G(xG1a, G2, G3)=1
Japanese (Hokkaidō)	0.088	217	Asari 2007	G1a=11, G(xG1a, G1b)=7, G1b=1
Evenk (New Barag Left Banner)	0.085	47	Kong 2003	G(xG1a, G2, G3)=4
Zhuang (Napo County, Guangxi)	0.085	130		G2=8; G(xG2)=3
Pumi (Ninglang, Yunnan)	0.083	36	Wen 2004	G(xG2, G3)=2, G3=1
Kalmyk (Kalmykia)	0.082	110	Derenko 2007	G2a=7, G1=1, G(xG1, G2a, G3)=1
Buryat	0.080	25	Starikovskaya 2005	G2=1, G3=1
Buryat	0.079	126	Kong 2003	G2a=8, G2(xG2a)=2
Korean (South Korea)	0.079	203	Umetsu 2005	G1a=9, G(xG1a, G1b)=7
Bai (Dali, Yunnan)	0.074	68	Wen 2004	G2(xG2a)=5
Dargin (Dagestan)	0.071	28	Marchani 2008	G=2
Uzbek (Xinjiang)	0.069	58	Yao 2004	G2a=2, G3=1, G(xG1a, G2, G3)=1
Chinese (Shenyang, Liaoning)	0.069	160	Umetsu 2005	G(xG1a, G1b)=8, G1a=3
Korean (South Korea)	0.068	103	Derenko 2007	G2a=3, G1=2, G3=2
Korean (Seoul National University Hospital)	0.068	633	Fuku 2007	G=43
Yakut (northern Yakutia)	0.068	148	Fedorova 2013	G2a5=6, G2a(xG2a5)=2, G1b=2
Chukchi (Anadyr)	0.067	15	Derenko 2007	G1=1
Naxi (Lijiang, Yunnan)	0.067	45	Wen 2004	G(xG2, G3)=3
Tujia (Yongshun, Hunan)	0.067	30	Wen 2004	G(xG2, G3)=1, G2(xG2a)=1
Tuvinian	0.067	105	Derenko 2007	G2a=4, G1=2, G3=1
Gelao (Daozhen County, Guizhou)	0.065	31		G2a=2
Mien (Shangsi, Guangxi)	0.063	32		G2=2
Korean (South Korea)	0.061	261	Kim 2008	G(xG2)=11, G2=5
Mansi	0.061	98	Starikovskaya 2005	G2=6
Japanese (Miyazaki)	0.060	100	Uchiyama 2007	G4a=2, G1a=1, G1b=1, G2a1(xG2a1a)=1, G2a1a=1
Han (Beijing Normal University)	0.058	121	Zheng 2011	G=7
Tibetan (Zhongdian, Yunnan)	0.057	35	Wen 2004	G3=2
Kazakh (Xinjiang)	0.057	53	Yao 2004	G1a=1, G2a=1, G(xG1a, G2, G3)=1
Altai Kizhi	0.056	90	Derenko 2007	G1=4, G2a=1
Tibetan (Nyingchi, Tibet)	0.056	54	Ji 2012	G2(xG2a)=1, G2a=1, G3b=1
Han (Denver, Colorado)	0.055	73	Zheng 2011	G=4
Kazakh (Kazakhstan)	0.055	55	Yao 2004	G2a=3
Japanese (Tōhoku)	0.054	336	Umetsu 2005	G1a=13, G(xG1a, G1b)=5
Nivkh (northern Sakhalin)	0.054	56	Starikovskaya 2005	G1=3
Karakalpak (Uzbekistan/Kyrgyzstan)	0.050	20	Comas 2004	G2a=1
Kim Mun (Malipo, Yunnan)	0.050	40		G2=2
Tajik (Uzbekistan/Kyrgyzstan)	0.050	20	Comas 2004	G2a=1
Uzbek (Uzbekistan/Kyrgyzstan)	0.050	40	Comas 2004	G2a=2
Yi (Shuangbai, Yunnan)	0.050	40	Wen 2004	G(xG2, G3)=1, G2(xG2a)=1
Orok (Sakhalin)	0.049	61	Bermisheva 2005	G=3
Gelao (Daozhen County, Guizhou)	0.049	102		G(xG2, G3)=4, G2a1=1
Yakut (vicinity of Yakutsk)	0.049	164	Fedorova 2013	G2a(xG2a5)=6, G2a5=2
Hmong (Jishou, Hunan)	0.049	103		G3=2, G(xG2, G3)=2, G2=1
Vietnamese	0.048	42	Jin 2009	G1a=1, G3=1
Japanese (northern Kyūshū)	0.047	256	Umetsu 2005	G(xG1a, G1b)=9, G1a=3
Tujia (western Hunan)	0.047	64	Wen 2004	G(xG2, G3)=1, G2(xG2a)=1, G3=1
Tajik (Tajikistan)	0.045	44	Derenko 2007	G2a=1, G3=1
Yukaghir (Verkhnekolymsky & Nizhnekolymsky)	0.045	22	Fedorova 2013	G1b=1
Hazara (North West Frontier Province & Balochistan)	0.043	23	Quintana-Murci 2004	G=1
Mongol (New Barag Left Banner)	0.042	48	Kong 2003	G2(xG2a)=2
Evenk (Krasnoyarsk)	0.041	73	Derenko 2007	G2a=2, G1=1
Aini (Xishuangbanna, Yunnan)	0.040	50	Wen 2004	G2a=2
Korean (northern China)	0.039	51	Jin 2009	G2a=1, G2(xG2a)=1
Kumik (Dagestan)	0.038	26	Marchani 2008	G=1
Lanten Yao (Tianlin, Guangxi)	0.038	26		G2=1
Yakut (Vilyuy River basin)	0.036	111	Fedorova 2013	G2a(xG2a5)=2, G2a5=1, G1b=1
Dong (Tianzhu County, Guizhou)	0.036	28		G(xG1a, G2)=1
Cun (Hainan)	0.033	30		G=1
Nu (Gongshan, Yunnan)	0.033	30	Wen 2004	G(xG2, G3)=1
Lingao (Hainan)	0.032	31		G=1
Yi (Luxi, Yunnan)	0.032	31	Wen 2004	G(xG2, G3)=1
Pan Yao (Tianlin, Guangxi)	0.031	32		G(xG2, G3)=1
Nogai (Dagestan)	0.030	33	Marchani 2008	G=1
Han (Southwest China; pool of 44 Sichuan, 34 Chongqing, 33 Yunnan, & 26 Guizhou)	0.029	137	Ji 2012	G1=3, G2=1
Han (southern California)	0.028	390	Ji 2012	G=11
Telenghit (Altai Republic)	0.028	71	Derenko 2007	G2a=2
Yakut (Yakutia)	0.028	36	Derenko 2007	G2a=1
Hmong (Wenshan, Yunnan)	0.026	39		G(xG2, G3)=1
Yakut	0.026	117	Kong 2003	G2a=2, G1a=1
Evenk (Ust-Maysky, Oleneksky, and Zhigansky)	0.024	125	Fedorova 2013	G1b=2, G2a(xG2a5)=1
Uzbek (Surkhandarya, Uzbekistan)	0.024	42	Quintana-Murci 2004	G=1
Evenk (Buryatia)	0.022	45	Derenko 2007	G3=1
Taiwanese (Taipei, Taiwan)	0.022	91	Umetsu 2005	G(xG1a, G1b)=2
Han (Taiwan)	0.021	1117	Ji 2012	G=24
Han (Xinjiang)	0.021	47	Yao 2004	G2a=1
Kyrgyz (Sary-Tash)	0.021	47	Yao 2004	G2a=1
Hindu (New Delhi)	0.021	48	Fornarino 2009	G(xG2a)=1
Kazakh (Kosh-Agachsky, Altai Republic)	0.020	98	Derenko 2012	G2=1, G3=1
Turkish (Anatolia, Turkey)	0.020	50	Quintana-Murci 2004	G=1
Khanty	0.019	106	Pimenoff 2008	G2=2
Uyghur (Kazakhstan)	0.018	55	Yao 2004	G2(xG2a)=1
Khakassian (Khakassia)	0.018	57	Derenko 2007	G3=1
Mansi	0.016	63	Pimenoff 2008	G2=1
Okinawa	0.015	326	Umetsu 2005	G(xG1a, G1b)=3, G1a=2
Persian (eastern Iran)	0.012	82	Derenko 2007	G2a=1
Pakistani (Karachi, Pakistan)	0.010	100	Quintana-Murci 2004	G=1
Li (Hainan)	0.009	346		G=3
Dolgan (Anabarsky, Volochanka, Ust-Avam, and Dudinka)	0.006	154	Fedorova 2013	G1b=1
Cham (Bình Thuận, Vietnam)	0.006	168		G=1
Turkish people	0.005	773		G2a2(xG2a2a)=4
Taiwan aborigines	0.002	640		G=1
Dingban Yao (Mengla, Yunnan)	0.000	10		-
Yukaghir (Upper Kolyma)	0.000	18	Volodko 2008	-
Filipino (Palawan)	0.000	20	Scholes 2011	-
Yi (Hezhang County, Guizhou)	0.000	20		-
Hindu (Chitwan, Nepal)	0.000	24	Fornarino 2009	-
Guoshan Yao (Jianghua, Hunan)	0.000	24		-
Bunu (Dahua & Tianlin, Guangxi)	0.000	25		-
Kurd (northwestern Iran)	0.000	25	Derenko 2007	-
Iu Mien (Mengla, Yunnan)	0.000	27		-
Andhra Pradesh (tribal)	0.000	29	Fornarino 2009	-
Tujia (Yanhe County, Guizhou)	0.000	29		-
Batak (Palawan)	0.000	31	Scholes 2011	-
Wuzhou Yao (Fuchuan, Guangxi)	0.000	31		-
Bapai Yao (Liannan, Guangdong)	0.000	35		-
Tibetan (Nagchu, Tibet)	0.000	35	Ji 2012	-
Aleut (Commander Islands)	0.000	36	Volodko 2008	-
Eskimo (Sireniki)	0.000	37	Volodko 2008	-
Eskimo (Naukan)	0.000	39	Volodko 2008	-
Nganasan	0.000	39	Volodko 2008	-
Thai	0.000	40	Jin 2009	-
Lowland Yao (Fuchuan, Guangxi)	0.000	42		-
Eskimo (Chaplin)	0.000	50	Volodko 2008	-
Teleut (Kemerovo)	0.000	53	Derenko 2007	-
Han (Hunan & Fujian)	0.000	55	Zheng 2011	-
Saami (Finland)	0.000	69	Tambets 2004	-
Shor (Kemerovo)	0.000	82	Derenko 2007	-
Eskimo (Canada)	0.000	96	Volodko 2008	-
Saami (Sweden)	0.000	98	Tambets 2004	-
Aleut (Aleutian Islands)	0.000	163	Volodko 2008	-
Saami (Norway)	0.000	278	Tambets 2004	-
Eskimo (Greenland)	0.000	385	Volodko 2008	-

== Subclades ==
Subclade G2 is the most widely distributed, being found with low frequency in many populations all the way from eastern Europe (Poles, Ukrainians, Lipka Tatars) and western Siberia (Mansi, Khanty) to Japan (Japanese, Ainu) and from Iran (Persian) to southern China (Hmong and Tujia in Hunan and Mien in Guangxi) and Southeast Asia (Myanmar, Thailand, Cambodia). G2 (and especially its subclade G2a) is notably frequent among many Mongolic- or Turkic-speaking populations of northern East Asia and Central Asia. G2a also has been found with high frequency in some samples of Tharus from southern Nepal. The subclade G2a3 has been observed in Russia, an Azeri in Iran, and a Uyghur in Artux, Xinjiang, China; its subclade G2a3a has been observed among Komis and Udmurts. Subclade G2a4 has been observed in China, Taiwan, and in a Ukrainian from the Lviv region of western Ukraine. Subclade G2a5 has been observed in Japan, Korea, and among Buryats, Barghuts, and various Turkic peoples (Karachay, Balkar, Kyrgyz, Kazakh, Karakalpak, Telengit, Tubalar, Yakut).

Subclade G1 is almost completely responsible for the high frequency of haplogroup G in populations located around the Sea of Okhotsk (Itelmen, Koryak, Negidal, Ulch, Ainu, Chukchi, Nivkh, etc.). G1 in Luoravetlans (Koryak & Chukchi) is essentially G1b, and this subclade is also found with generally low frequency in populations of Yakutia to the west (Evens, Yukaghirs, Evenks, Yakuts, Dolgans) as well as in Japan. G1a has been found in samples from China (Daur, Hui, Kazakh, Sarikoli, Korean, Manchu, Yi, Jino, Yunnan Dai, Jiangxi Han, and a sample of the general population of the city of Shenyang), Tajikistan (Pamiris), Japan, Korea, Vietnam, and central Siberia (Yakut, Altai-kizhi). G1c has been found in China, Korea, and a Seletar.

Subclade G3 is relatively rare. It has been found mainly among Koreans, Tibetans, and presently Turkic- or Mongolic-speaking populations in southern Siberia and vicinity, and occasionally among Evenks in Buryatia, Japanese, Pumi, Naxi, Uyghurs, Sarikolis, Tajiks, Pashtuns and Hazaras in Afghanistan, Kashmir, Han Chinese in Sichuan, Hmong and Tujia in western Hunan, and Vietnamese.

Subclade G4 has been found in Japan and possibly in one Chinese individual from Guizhou.

=== Tree ===
This phylogenetic tree of haplogroup G subclades is based on the paper by Mannis van Oven and Manfred Kayser Updated comprehensive phylogenetic tree of global human mitochondrial DNA variation and subsequent published research.

- G
  - G1
    - G1a
      - G1a1
        - G1a1a
          - G1a1a1
          - G1a1a2
          - G1a1a3
      - G1a2'3
        - G1a2
        - G1a3
          - G1a3a
    - G1b
    - G1c
  - G2
    - G2a
      - G2a1
        - G2a1a
        - G2a1b
        - G2a1c
      - G2a2
      - G2a3
        - G2a3a
      - G2a4
    - G2b
      - G2b1
  - G3
    - G3a
      - G3a1
      - G3a2
    - G3b
      - G3b1
  - G4

== See also ==
- Genealogical DNA test
- Genetic genealogy
- Human mitochondrial genetics
- Population genetics
- Human mitochondrial DNA haplogroups
