= Biyka =

Biyka Бийка
- Selo
- Location within Altai Republic Location within Russia
- Coordinates: 51°55′N 87°39′E
- Country: Russia
- Region: Altai Republic
- District: Turochaksky District
- Time zone: UTC+7:00

Biyka (Russian: Бийка; Altay: Бий, Biy) is a rural locality (a selo) in and the administrative centre of Biykinskoye Rural Settlement, Turochaksky District, the Altai Republic, Russia. The population was 537 as of 2016. There are 15 streets.

== Geography ==
Biyka is located 78 km southeast of Turochak (the district's administrative centre) by road. Chuyka is the nearest rural locality.
