= Brigitte Pakendorf =

Linguist and biological anthropologist (born 1970)

- Born: 1970 (age 55–56)
- Citizenship: South African
- Education: Linguistics and Genetics Molecular Anthropology
- Alma mater: University of Hamburg(PhD Biology, 2001) University of Leiden(PhD linguistics, 2007)
- Occupation: Director of Research(DRCE) at CNRS
- Awards: CNRS Silver Medal (2016) Best Dissertation Price (2008, Dutch Association for General Linguistic and Anela) Member, Academia Europapea(elected 2019)

Brigitte Pakendorf (born 1970) is a linguist and geneticist at the French National Centre for Scientific Research (CNRS).

== Education ==
After receiving her MA in biological anthropology in 1996, Pakendorf studied for two doctorates: one in biology, one in linguistics. She received the former in 2001 from the University of Hamburg and the latter in 2007 from the University of Leiden. This second thesis brought together her interests in dealing with contact in the prehistory of the Sakha, or Yakuts, from both linguistic and genetic perspectives. It received the 2008 prize for the best dissertation in linguistics defended at a Dutch university, awarded jointly by the Dutch Association for General Linguistics (AVT) and Association for Applied Linguistics (Anéla).

== Career and honours ==
From 2006 to 2012 Pakendorf was leader of a Max Planck Society junior research group on Comparative Population Linguistics at the Max Planck Institute for Evolutionary Anthropology in Leipzig. In 2012 she took up a position as senior researcher (DR2) at the French National Centre for Scientific Research (CNRS) in the laboratory Dynamique du langage (Language dynamics). She was promoted to senior researcher first class (DR1) in 2016, and exceptional class (DRCE) in 2018.

Pakendorf has received numerous honours and awards for her research. In 2016 she was awarded a CNRS Silver Medal. In 2019 she was elected member of the Academia Europaea.

== Research ==
Pakendorf's research is interdisciplinary, bridging biology, anthropology and linguistics. She works on languages of Siberia, in particular Even, Negidal and other Tungusic languages. The topics that she has investigated include prehistory, language contact, linguistic typology, areal linguistics, molecular anthropology, and language documentation. She has received major grants from the German Research Foundation, Endangered Languages Documentation Programme, Leakey Foundation, Volkswagen Foundation and Wenner-Gren Foundation to investigate and document the languages and history of the groups mentioned above.

== Selected publications ==
- Pakendorf, Brigitte and Mark Stoneking. 2005. Mitochondrial DNA and human evolution. Annual Review of Genomics and Human Genetics 6, 165–183, doi:10.1146/annurev.genom.6.080604.162249
- Pakendorf, Brigitte, Innokentij N. Novgorodov, Vladimir L. Osakovskij, Al'bina P. Danilova, Artur P. Protod'jakonov and Mark Stoneking. 2006 Investigating the effects of prehistoric migrations in Siberia: genetic variation and the origins of Yakuts. Human Genetics 120, 334–353. doi:10.1007/s00439-006-0213-2
- Pickrell, Joseph K., Nick Patterson, Chiara Barbieri, Falko Berthold, Linda Gerlach, Tom Güldemann, Blesswell Kure, Sununguko Wata Mpoloka, Hirosi Nakagawa, Christfried Naumann, Mark Lipson, Po-Ru Loh, Joseph Lachance, Joanna Mountain, Carlos D. Bustamante, Bonnie Berger, Sarah A. Tishkoff, Brenna M. Henn, Mark Stoneking, David Reich and Brigitte Pakendorf. 2012. The genetic prehistory of southern Africa. Nature Communications 3, 1143. doi:10.1038/ncomms2140
- Pickrell, Joseph K., Nick Patterson, Po-Ru Loh, Mark Lipson, Bonnie Berger, Mark Stoneking, Brigitte Pakendorf, and David Reich. 2014. Ancient west Eurasian ancestry in southern and eastern Africa. Biological Sciences 111 (7) 2632–2637. doi:10.1073/pnas.1313787111
- Pakendorf, Brigitte, Nina Dobrushina and Olesya Khanina. 2021. A typology of small-scale multilingualism. International Journal of Bilingualism 25 (4). doi:10.1177/13670069211023137
