= Tozhu Tuvans =

Tozhu Tyvans
Тугалар / Тухалар
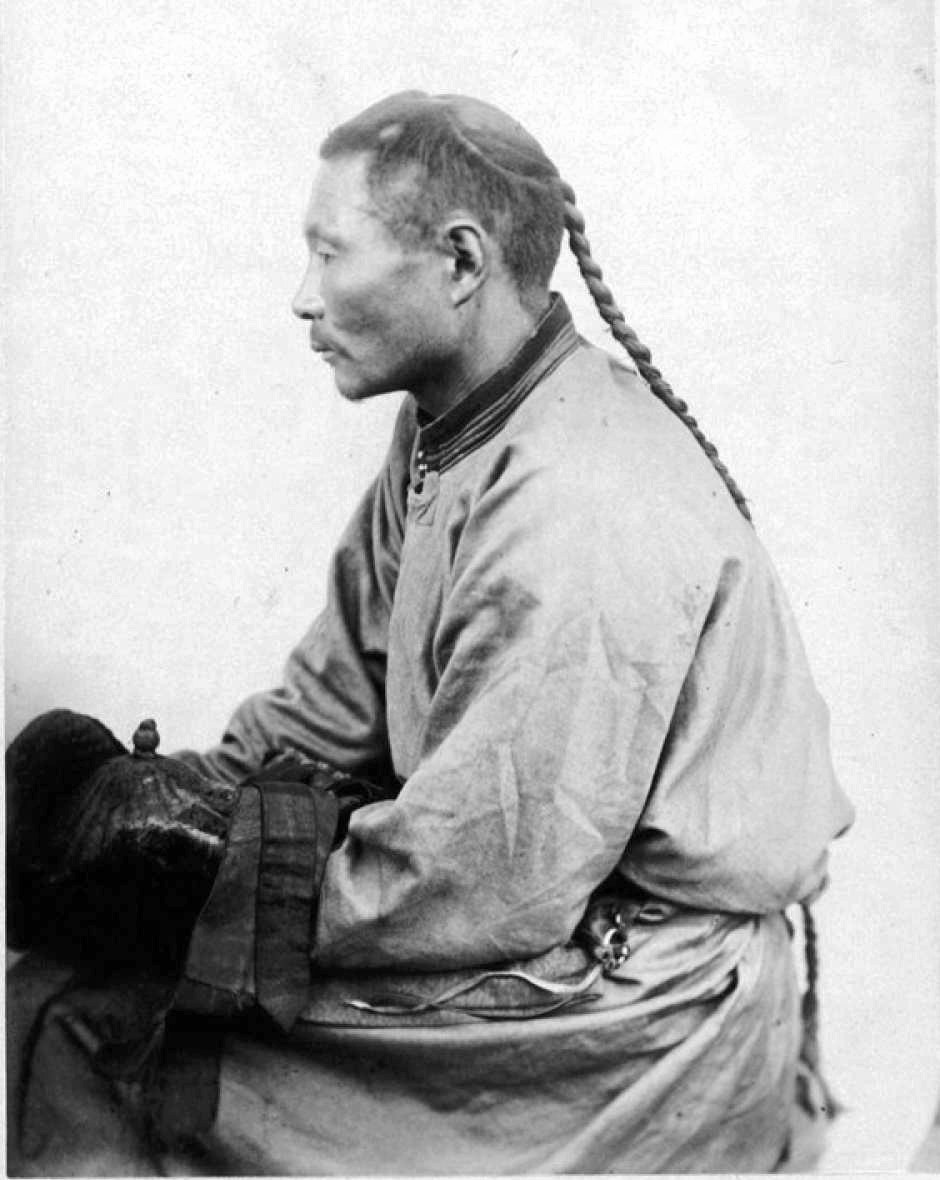
- a Tozhu Tyvan man, Iy (Ий) River, 1897

Total population
- 4,442 (2002)
- Russia: 1,858

Languages
- Tozhu Tyvan, Russian

Religion
- Tibetan Buddhism, Tengrism

Related ethnic groups
- Other Tyvans, Dukhans, Tofalars, Soyots, Samoyeds, several other Turkic peoples and Uriankhai Mongols

The Tozhu Tuvans, Tozhu Tuvinians, Todzhan Tyvans or Todzhinians (own name: Тугалар Tugalar or Тухалар Tukhalar; Russian Тувинцы-тоджинцы Tuvincy-todžincy, Тоджинцы Todžincy) are a subgroup of the Tuvans living in Todzhinsky District of the Republic of Tuva. The Tozhu Tyvans are reindeer herders.

== Language ==
Tozhu Tyvan
- Native to: Russia
- Region: Todzhinsky District, Tyva
- Ethnicity: Tozhu Tyvans
- Language family: Turkic: Common Turkic; Siberian Turkic; South Siberian; Sayan Turkic; Taiga Sayan Turkic; Tozhu Tyvan

Language codes
- ISO 639-3: –
- Glottolog: todj1234 Todja

The language of the Tozhu Tyvan people is a subdialect of Eastern (or Northeastern) dialect of Tyvan language. The Tozhu Tyvan dialect is classified as part of the Taiga Sayan Turkic branch of Sayan Turkic along with Tere-Khöl Tuvan, while most other Tyvan dialects are classified as part of the Steppe Sayan Turkic branch.

== Genetics ==
Y-DNA haplogroups, by percentage: Q — 52%, N — 37%: N-L666 — 21%, N3a5а — 12%.

== Bibliography ==
- Chadamba, Z. B. Тоджинский диалект тувинского языка (The Tozhu dialect of the Tuvan language). Kyzyl: Tuvknigoizdat, 1974
- Вайнштейн 1961 – Вайнштейн С.И. Тувинцы-тоджинцы. Историко-этнографические очерки. - М., 1961.
- Donahoe 2002 - Donahoe B. "Hey, You! Get offa my Taiga!" : comparing the sense of property rights among the Tofa and Tozhu-Tyva. – Halle/Saale: Max Planck Inst. for Social Anthropology Working Paper Series No. 38, 2002.
- Donahoe 2004 - Donahoe B. A line in the Sayans: history and divergent perceptions of property among the Tozhu and Tofa of South Siberia. - Bloomington : Indiana University, 2004.
- Donahoe 2006 - Donahoe B. Who owns the Taiga?: inclusive vs. exclusive senses of property among the Tozhu and Tofa of southern Siberia. - In Sibirica (5:1), 2006. - P.87-116.
- Донахо 2008 – Донахо Б. Тувинцы-тоджинцы: очерк современной культуры // Тюркские народы Восточной Сибири / Отв. ред. Д.А. Функ, Н.А. Алексеев. М., 2008. С. 186–204.
