= New Barag Left Banner =

New Barag Left Banner 新巴尔虎左旗 • ᠰᠢᠨ᠎ᠡ ᠪᠠᠷᠭᠤ ᠵᠡᠭᠦᠨ ᠬᠣᠰᠢᠭᠤ
- Banner
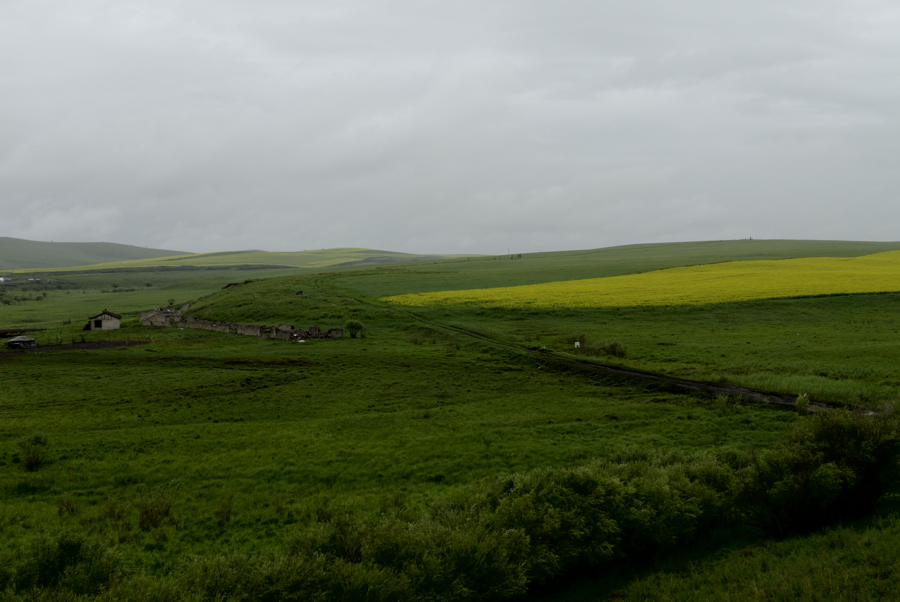

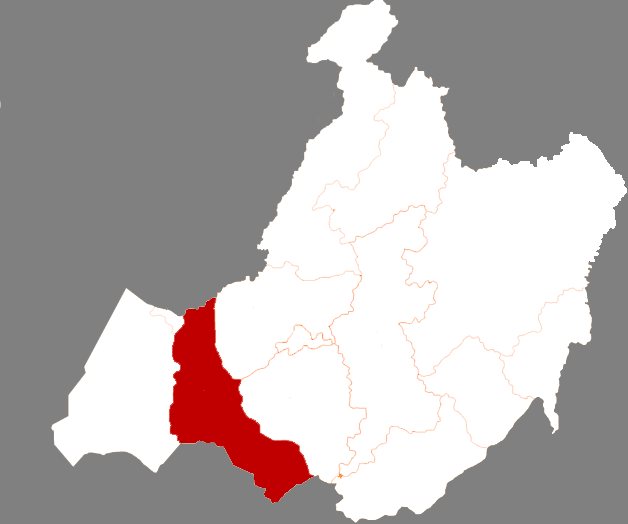
- Location in Hulunbuir

- Location in Inner Mongolia New Barag Left Banner (China)
- Coordinates: 48°13′N 118°16′E
- Country: China
- Autonomous region: Inner Mongolia
- Prefecture-level city: Hulunbuir
- Banner seat: Amgalang

Area
  - Total: 20,107.18 km^{2} (7,763.43 sq mi)
- Elevation: 648 m (2,126 ft)

Population (2020)
  - Total: 37,007
  - Density: 1.8405/km^{2} (4.7668/sq mi)
- Time zone: UTC+8 (China Standard)
- Website: www.xzq.gov.cn

New Barag Left Banner

Chinese name
- Simplified Chinese: 新巴尔虎左旗
- Traditional Chinese: 新巴爾虎左旗
Transcriptions
Standard Mandarin
- Hanyu Pinyin: Xīn Bā'ěrhǔ Zuǒ Qí

Mongolian name
- Mongolian Cyrillic: Шинэ Барга зүүн хошуу
- Mongolian script: ᠰᠢᠨ᠎ᠡ ᠪᠠᠷᠭᠤ ᠵᠡᠭᠦᠨ ᠬᠣᠰᠢᠭᠤ
Transcriptions
- SASM/GNC: Sin-e Barɣu Jegün qosiɣu

New Barag Left Banner (Mongolian: ᠰᠢᠨ᠎ᠡ ᠪᠠᠷᠭᠤ ᠵᠡᠭᠦᠨ ᠬᠣᠰᠢᠭᠤ; Chinese: 新巴尔虎左旗) is a banner of Inner Mongolia, China, bordering Mongolia to the south. It is under the administration of Hulunbuir City.

== Administrative divisions ==
New Barag Left Banner is made up of 2 towns and 5 ethnic sums.

Name	Simplified Chinese	Hanyu Pinyin	Mongolian (Hudum Script)	Mongolian (Cyrillic)	Administrative division code
Towns
Qagan Town	嵯岗镇	Cuógǎng Zhèn	ᠴᠠᠭᠠᠨ ᠪᠠᠯᠭᠠᠰᠤ	Цагаан балгас	150726101
Amgalang Town	阿木古郎镇	Āmùgǔláng Zhèn	ᠠᠮᠤᠭᠤᠯᠠᠩ ᠪᠠᠯᠭᠠᠰᠤ	Амгалан балгас	150726102
Sums
Xin Bulag Sum	新宝力格苏木	Xīnbǎolìgé Sūmù	ᠰᠢᠨᠡᠪᠤᠯᠠᠭ ᠰᠤᠮᠤ	Шинэбулаг сум	150726202
Obor Bulag Sum	乌布尔宝力格苏木	Wūbù'ěrbǎolìgé Sūmù	ᠥᠪᠥᠷᠪᠤᠯᠠᠭ ᠰᠤᠮᠤ	Өвөрбулаг сум	150726203
Handgai Sum	罕达盖苏木	Hǎndágài Sūmù	ᠬᠠᠨᠳᠠᠭᠠᠢ ᠰᠤᠮᠤ	Хандгай сум	150726204
Jibhlangt Sum	吉布胡郎图苏木	Jíbùhúlángtú Sūmù	ᠵᠢᠪᠬᠤᠯᠠᠩᠲᠤ ᠰᠤᠮᠤ	Жавхлант сум	150726205
Ganjur Sum	甘珠尔苏木	Gānzhū'ěr Sūmù	ᠭᠠᠨᠵᠤᠤᠷ ᠰᠤᠮᠤ	Ганжуур сум	150726206

== Climate ==
Climate data for New Barag Left Banner, elevation 642 m (2,106 ft), (1991–2020 normals, extremes 1981–2010)
Month	Jan	Feb	Mar	Apr	May	Jun	Jul	Aug	Sep	Oct	Nov	Dec	Year
Record high °C (°F)	−0.9 (30.4)	7.7 (45.9)	19.8 (67.6)	30.7 (87.3)	36.2 (97.2)	40.4 (104.7)	40.9 (105.6)	39.0 (102.2)	33.8 (92.8)	27.0 (80.6)	13.2 (55.8)	1.8 (35.2)	40.9 (105.6)
Mean daily maximum °C (°F)	−17.8 (0.0)	−12.0 (10.4)	−1.8 (28.8)	10.7 (51.3)	19.6 (67.3)	25.9 (78.6)	27.9 (82.2)	25.9 (78.6)	19.2 (66.6)	8.9 (48.0)	−4.5 (23.9)	−15.2 (4.6)	7.2 (45.0)
Daily mean °C (°F)	−23.0 (−9.4)	−18.3 (−0.9)	−8.3 (17.1)	3.9 (39.0)	12.7 (54.9)	19.4 (66.9)	22.0 (71.6)	19.7 (67.5)	12.4 (54.3)	2.3 (36.1)	−10.3 (13.5)	−20.1 (−4.2)	1.0 (33.9)
Mean daily minimum °C (°F)	−27.1 (−16.8)	−23.2 (−9.8)	−13.9 (7.0)	−2.3 (27.9)	5.7 (42.3)	12.9 (55.2)	16.4 (61.5)	14.2 (57.6)	6.7 (44.1)	−2.8 (27.0)	−14.7 (5.5)	−24.1 (−11.4)	−4.4 (24.2)
Record low °C (°F)	−40.8 (−41.4)	−39.3 (−38.7)	−31.0 (−23.8)	−22.8 (−9.0)	−7.5 (18.5)	0.4 (32.7)	5.7 (42.3)	2.6 (36.7)	−5.8 (21.6)	−19.7 (−3.5)	−32.4 (−26.3)	−38.0 (−36.4)	−40.8 (−41.4)
Average precipitation mm (inches)	3.2 (0.13)	2.5 (0.10)	5.6 (0.22)	11.4 (0.45)	19.2 (0.76)	44.1 (1.74)	77.2 (3.04)	64.3 (2.53)	31.1 (1.22)	12.6 (0.50)	6.2 (0.24)	5.9 (0.23)	283.3 (11.16)
Average precipitation days (≥ 0.1 mm)	5.8	4.3	4.6	5.1	6.7	9.7	12.5	10.6	7.7	5.8	6.3	7.9	87
Average snowy days	8.3	5.9	7.3	5.2	0.9	0.1	0	0	0.6	4.6	9.1	10.4	52.4
Average relative humidity (%)	75	73	63	44	41	50	60	61	56	56	69	76	60
Mean monthly sunshine hours	171.7	201.7	263.3	255.3	281.3	285.3	277.1	258.6	242.4	212.4	161.8	148.2	2,759.1
Percentage possible sunshine	62	69	71	62	60	60	58	59	65	64	59	57	62
Source: China Meteorological Administration
