= Sarah McGuinness =

Irish musician and writer

- Born: Sarah Townsend; Derry, Northern Ireland
- Occupations: Singer, director, producer, writer
- Notable work: Eddie Izzard: Stripped (2009); Believe: The Eddie Izzard Story (2009); Eddie Izzard: Force Majeure Live (2013)
- Style: Documentary film, short film, theatre production
- Website: www.sarahmcguinness.com

Sarah Townsend, known professionally as Sarah McGuinness, is an Irish singer, composer, producer, director and screenwriter.

Born in Derry, Northern Ireland, McGuinness grew up singing harmonies with her mother and sisters in County Donegal. At Christmas, she sang carols with a young Peter Cunnah (D ream).

McGuinness moved to London at the age of 18 to study English and Drama. She has worked in theatre and stage shows, moving into music production and then into feature and documentary film-making.

In 2010, she received an Emmy nomination for her work on Believe: The Eddie Izzard Story for Outstanding Nonfiction Special. She wrote and performed the entire soundtrack.

McGuinness directed the BAFTA short listed documentary Noma: Forgiving Apartheid, that tells the story of Noma Dumezweni, in 2015.

In November 2017, McGuinness released her debut album Unbroken on Right Track Music through Universal.

== Early career ==
McGuinness started running Oxmad Theatre Company, while working backstage on West End shows to fund herself. While living in Edinburgh, she then set up the GreyFriars Kirk House, an ex-soup kitchen which she turned into a venue for the Edinburgh Festival Fringe. During the festival, McGuinness ran shows including Bertolt Brecht's A Respectable Wedding and Company of Wolves by Polka TC, for 20 theatre companies from across the globe.

In Edinburgh, she discovered a number of stand-up comedians including Ardal O'Hanlon (star of the hit Irish sitcom Father Ted) who made his UK debut at the venue. McGuinness also premiered Eddie Izzard's first solo standup show where she received her prestigious Perrier Award nomination. For a brief period of time, Townsend promoted Izzard along with Jenny Eclair.

McGuinness then used the profits she earned to produce her own plays, which she toured around the UK and Ireland including a commedia version of Molière's Medecin Malgre Lui and a punk version of Bulgakov's Molière. It was on the set of Molière that she met Laurence Olivier Award-winning English actress Noma Dumezweni, who would go on to become the focus of her 2015 short documentary, Noma (Forgiving Apartheid) which premiered at the 2015 Foyle Film Festival before officially entering the film festival circuit throughout 2016.

In the early nineties, McGuinness took over the running the Time Out Street Entertainers Festival and mounted the World Street Fest in Covent Garden, bringing together performers from across the globe.

As McGuinness became more involved in the UK comedy scene, she opened a comedy club called The Swan in south London and ran the Soho comedy club Raging Bull, which was hosted regularly by Eddie Izzard for several years and featured a number of comedians during the period, including Jerry Sadowitz, Steve Coogan, Patrick Marber and Jo Brand.

Following Raging Bull, McGuinness set up the Halyon Club, in Soho in early 2000. With support from local jazz musicians, particularly Mercury award-winning composer and musician Guy Barker, Halyon became a music, art, and film club which held regular events for both up-and-coming and established artists. She closed the club due to other work commitments.

== Music and radio career ==
McGuinness performed with the band Wasp Factory during the 1990s. Their first single "Mandy Says" was produced by John O'Neill of The Undertones and was followed by second single, "Just Because". Both singles were featured on MTV in 1993. They also appeared on the UK television programme Naked City, and on Ruby Wax Meets... in 1996.

In Jake West's 2002 short, Whacked, she appeared as Niamh Ryan, and wrote the theme song "Miss You", produced by Peter Cunnah of D Ream.

She wrote the music for the UK Film Council funded 2004 short, Secrets by Paul Hills.

She composed the opening music for all of Eddie Izzard's show openings, Definite Article, Glorious, Dress To Kill, Circle, Sexie, Stripped and Force Majeure, as well as designing the poster for the latter.

In 2009, she composed the soundtrack to the Emmy Nominated documentary, Believe: The Eddie Izzard Story. The soundtrack was produced by Mickey Petralia and features the single, "Mama Can You See Me Now", which was remixed by William Orbit and released later in the year.

McGuinness opened for Eddie Izzard at Sydney Opera House and for Stripped to the Bowl at the Hollywood Bowl in 2011 performing tracks from the film soundtrack.

In 2015, she composed the soundtrack for the 2015 documentary, Noma (Forgiving Apartheid).

On 17 November 2017, McGuinness released her debut album Unbroken.

== Filmography ==
To transfer her skills across from theatre to film, McGuinness produced and directed a series of DVD extras including "Comedy Masterclass" and "24 Hours Sexie". She then produced a number of short films with executive producers Vince Power and Phil McIntyre, including Secrets written by Tony Thompson, Angel, and Whacked directed by Jake West. In addition to being screened on Sky Movies, Whacked also earned nods from the New York International Film Festival, Turner Classic Movies Shorts Awards, and the US International Film Festival.

McGuinness met Eddie Izzard in 1989, after Izzard approached her for a booking at the venue she was running at the Edinburgh Festival Fringe. After producing several DVD extras for Izzard, she was invited by Izzard in 2003 to film one of Izzard's shows. After deliberating for several months, she declined and instead opted to direct a documentary focused on the comedian.

== Believe: The Eddie Izzard Story ==
Written, produced and directed by McGuinness, the documentary film Believe: The Eddie Izzard Story was released in 2009. Known for her combined passion for music and humour the documentary was reviewed by the LA Times as being a heartfelt documentary on comedian/actor Eddie Izzard which blends home movies, interviews and performance footage to fine effect to reveal a raw perspective on the creative mastermind. Believe: The Eddie Izzard Story was released in theaters in the United Kingdom and the United States in October 2009, and then on DVD on 2 March 2010.

In 2010, Believe: The Eddie Izzard Story was nominated for an Emmy award for Outstanding Nonfiction Special.

== Production credits ==
=== Filmography ===
==== Producer ====
- Whacked (2002)
- Secrets (2004)
- Diva 51 (2006)
- Eddie Izzard: Stripped (2009)
- Eddie Izzard: Live from Wembley (2009)
- Believe: The Eddie Izzard Story (2009)
- Believe: Live at Madison Square Garden (2011)
- Marathons For Mandela (2013)
- Eddie Izzard: Force Majeure Live (2013)

==== Director ====
- Comedy Masterclass (2001)
- Diva 51 (2006)
- Eddie Izzard: Stripped (2009)
- Eddie Izzard: Live from Wembley (2009)
- Believe: The Eddie Izzard Story (2009)
- Marathons For Mandela (2013)
- Eddie Izzard: Force Majeure Live (2013)
- Noma (Forgiving Apartheid) (2015)
- Luisa Omielan: Am I Right Ladies (2015)

==== Writer ====
- Believe: The Eddie Izzard Story (2009)
- NOMA (Forgiving Apartheid) (2015)

=== Discography ===
==== Composer ====
- Eddie Izzard: Definite Article (1996)
- Eddie Izzard: Glorious (1997)
- Eddie Izzard: Circle (2000)
- Eddie Izzard: Sexie (2003)
- Eddie Izzard: Stripped (2009)
- Marathons For Mandela (2013)
- Eddie Izzard: Force Majeure Live (2013)
- NOMA (Forgiving Apartheid) (2015)
