= John Gordillo =

English comedian and director

- John Gordillo in March 2008.
- Born: Alberto John Gordillo; London

Comedy career
- Medium: Stand-up and director.
- Website: johngordillo.square.site

John Gordillo is a director and former comedian. He has directed and produced live shows, specials and TV series for Eddie Izzard, Reginald D Hunter, Ross Noble, Josh Widdicombe, Dylan Moran, Michael Mcintyre, Mark Steel, Shappi Khorsandi, Seann Walsh, Shazia Mirza and Sean Lock among others.

He has been described as "one of the key shapers of the modern comedy landscape" by The Guardian.

The Book about the Comedy Circuit "Comedy and Critique" describes Gordillo's work "as significant in the development of the modern Fringe show, intellectually sophisticated and formally rigorous work driven by a clear philosophy of comedy concerned with structure, emotional escalation, and the relationship between persona and material."

Gordillo performed stand-up from 1996 to 2000 before he co-created & hosted two series of The RDA aka The Recommended Daily Allowance, a talk show for BBC Three. Gordillo returned to stand-up in 2006. In 2016, his Work-in-Progress stand-up set won Best Show at the Leicester Comedy Festival.

Gordillo's solo work includes the 2009 production of Fuckonomics which received mixed reviews. British comedy website Chortle said the show's subject placed Gordillo "on potentially hack, misogynistic ground" whilst The Herald described it as "excruciatingly unfunny." More favourable reviews described Fuckonomics as "intellectually ambitious."

His show about his father, Divide & Conga, was received some positive reviews at the Edinburgh fringe and his show Cheap Shots at the Defenceless toured internationally and received mixed reviews.

In 2017, he directed & co-devised Ugly Chief at Battersea Arts Centre with performance artist Victoria Melody and her father, TV antiques dealer Mike Melody. The show was a seriocomic examination of death and the tensions of a father-daughter relationship. The piece received positive reviews.

Gordillo is represented by the British talent agency Off The Kerb.

== Filmography ==
Director

- Live at the Ambassadors (1993)
- Unrepeatable (1994)
- Blackout Comedy Lab (2005)
- Dave's One Night Stand (2011)
- Live: In The Midst of Crackers Reginald D. Hunter (2013)
- Freewheeling with Ross Noble (2014)
- Off the Hook: Dylan Moran Live (2015)
- Keep it Light: Sean Lock Live (2017)
- The RDA with John Gordillo (2000–2001)
- The Comedy Store
- Edinburgh Comedy Festival
- New Zealand Comedy Gala (2014)

== Live credits ==
- 2007 Free John Gordillo (at the Edinburgh Fringe)
- 2008 Divide & Conga (at the Edinburgh Fringe)
- 2009 Fuckonomics (at the Edinburgh Fringe)
- 2013 Cheap Shots at the Defenceless (at the Edinburgh Fringe)
- 2016 Love Capitalism (at the Edinburgh Fringe)

== Theatre credits ==
=== Director ===
- 2017 Ugly Chief
