= Haplogroup T (mtDNA) =

Human mitochondrial DNA haplogroup

Haplogroup (mtDNA) T
- Possible time of origin: 25,149 ± 4,668 years before present
- Possible place of origin: Middle East
- Ancestor: JT
- Descendants: T1 and T2
- Defining mutations: G709A, G1888A, A4917G, G8697A, T10463C, G13368A, G14905A, A15607G, G15928A, C16294T

Haplogroup T is a human mitochondrial DNA (mtDNA) haplogroup. It is believed to have originated around 25,100 years ago in the Near East.

== Origins ==
Mitochondrial clade T derives from the haplogroup JT, which also gave rise to the mtDNA haplogroup J. The T maternal clade is thought to have emanated from the Near East.

== Distribution ==
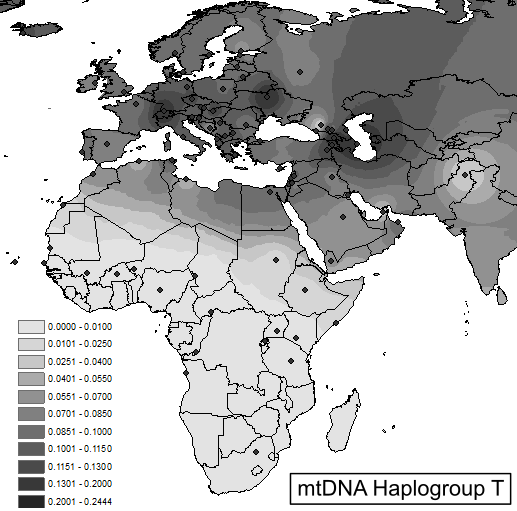
Projected spatial frequency distribution for haplogroup T.

The basal haplogroup T* is found among Algerians in Oran (1.67%) and Reguibate Sahrawi (0.93%). It is also distributed among the Soqotri (1.2%).

Haplogroup T is present at low frequencies throughout Western and Central Asia and Europe, with varying degrees of prevalence and certainly might have been present in other groups from the surrounding areas. Maternal T is found in approximately 10% of native Europeans. It is also common among modern day Iranians. Based on a sample of over 400 modern day Iranians, the T haplogroup represents roughly 8.3% of the population (about 1 out of 12 individuals), with the more specific T1 subtype constituting roughly half of those. Furthermore, the specific subtype T1 tends to be found further east and is common in Central Asian and modern Turkic populations (Lalueza-Fox 2004), who inhabit much of the same territory as the ancient Saka, Sarmatian, Andronovo, and other putative Iranian peoples of the 2nd and 1st millennia BC. Lalueza-Fox et al. (2004) also found several T and T1 sequences in ancient burials, including Kurgans, in the Kazakh steppe between the 14th-10th centuries BC, as well as later into the 1st millennia BC. These coincide with the latter part of the Andronovo period and the Saka period in the region.

The geographic distribution within subclade T2 varies greatly with the ratio of subhaplogroup T2e to T2b reported to vary 40-fold across examined populations from a low in Britain and Ireland, to a high in Saudi Arabia (Bedford 2012). Within subhaplogroup T2e, a very rare motif is identified among Sephardic Jews of Turkey and Bulgaria and suspected conversos from the New World (Bedford 2012).

Found in Svan population from Caucasus (Georgia) T* 10,4% and T1 4,2%. T1a1a1 is particularly common in countries with high levels of Y-haplogroup R1a, such as Central and Northeast Europe. The clade is also found everywhere in Central Asia and deep into North Asia, as far east as Mongolia.

T2c and T2d appear to have a Near Eastern origin around the time of the Last Glacial Maximum (LGM) and more recent dispersals into Europe. Most of T2c comprises haplogroup T2c1. Apart from a peak in Cyprus, T2c1 is most common in the Persian Gulf region but is also found in the Levant and in Mediterranean Europe, with a more far-flung distribution at very low levels.

T2 is also found among the Soqotri (7.7%).

=== Archaeology ===
Wilde et al. (2014) tested mtDNA samples from the Yamnaya culture, the presumed homeland of Proto-Indo-European speakers. They found T2a1b in the Middle Volga region in Russia and Bulgaria, and T1a both in central Ukraine and the Middle Volga, Russia. The frequency of T1a and T2 in Yamnaya samples were each 14.5%.

Haplogroup T has also been found among Iberomaurusian specimens dating from the Epipaleolithic at the Afalou prehistoric site in Algeria. One ancient individual carried the T2b subclade (1/9; 11%). Additionally, haplogroup T has been observed among ancient Egyptian mummies excavated at the Abusir el-Meleq archaeological site in Middle Egypt, which date from the Pre-Ptolemaic/late New Kingdom (T1, T2), Ptolemaic (T1, T2), and Roman (undifferentiated T, T1) periods. Fossils excavated at the Late Neolithic site of Kelif el Boroud in Morocco, which have been dated to around 3,000 BCE, have also been observed to carry the T2 subclade. Additionally, haplogroup T has been observed in ancient Guanche fossils excavated in Gran Canaria and Tenerife on the Canary Islands, which have been radiocarbon-dated to between the 7th and 11th centuries CE. The clade-bearing individuals were inhumed at the Tenerife site, with one specimen found to belong to the T2c1d2 subclade (1/7; 14%).

=== Africa ===
In Africa, haplogroup T is primarily found among Afro-Asiatic-speaking populations, including the basal T* clade. Some non-basal T clades are also commonly found among the Niger-Congo-speaking Serer due to diffusion from the Maghreb, likely with the spread of Islam.

Population	Location	Language Family	N	Frequency	Source
Amhara	Ethiopia	Afro-Asiatic > Semitic	5/120	4.17%	Kivisild 2004
Beja	Sudan	Afro-Asiatic > Cushitic	1/48	2.1%	Hassan 2009
Beta Israel	Ethiopia	Afro-Asiatic > Cushitic	0/29	0.00%	Behar 2008a
Copt	Egypt	Afro-Asiatic > Egyptian	5/29	17.2%	Hassan 2009
Dawro K.	Ethiopia	Afro-Asiatic > Omotic	2/137	1.46%	Castrì 2008 and Boattini 2013
Egyptians (El-Hayez)	Egypt	Afro-Asiatic > Semitic	10/35	28.6%	Kujanova 2009
Ethiopia	Ethiopia	Undetermined	2/77	2.60%	Soares 2011
Ethiopian Jew	Ethiopia	Afro-Asiatic > Cushitic	0/41	0.00%	Non 2011
Gurage	Ethiopia	Afro-Asiatic > Semitic	0/21	0.00%	Kivisild 2004
Hamer	Ethiopia	Afro-Asiatic > Omotic	0/11	0.00%	Castrì 2008 and Boattini 2013
Ongota	Ethiopia	Afro-Asiatic > Cushitic	0/19	0.00%	Castrì 2008 and Boattini 2013
Oromo	Ethiopia	Afro-Asiatic > Cushitic	0/33	0.00%	Kivisild 2004
Tigrai	Ethiopia	Afro-Asiatic > Semitic	3/44	6.82%	Kivisild 2004
Daasanach	Kenya	Afro-Asiatic > Cushitic	0/49	0.00%	Poloni 2009
Elmolo	Kenya	Afro-Asiatic > Cushitic	0/52	0.00%	Castrì 2008 and Boattini 2013
Luo	Kenya	Nilo-Saharan	0/49	0.00%	Castrì 2008 and Boattini 2013
Maasai	Kenya	Nilo-Saharan	0/81	0.00%	Castrì 2008 and Boattini 2013
Nairobi	Kenya	Niger-Congo	0/100	0.00%	Brandstatter 2004
Nyangatom	Kenya	Nilo-Saharan	0/112	0.00%	Poloni 2009
Rendille	Kenya	Afro-Asiatic > Cushitic	0/17	0.00%	Castrì 2008 and Boattini 2013
Samburu	Kenya	Nilo-Saharan	0/35	0.00%	Castrì 2008 and Boattini 2013
Turkana	Kenya	Nilo-Saharan	0/51	0.00%	Castrì 2008 and Boattini 2013
Hutu	Rwanda	Niger-Congo	0/42	0.00%	Castrì 2009
Dinka	Sudan	Nilo-Saharan	0/46	0.00%	Krings 1999
Sudan	Sudan	Undetermined	3/102	2.94%	Soares 2011
Burunge	Tanzania	Afro-Asiatic > Cushitic	0/38	0.00%	Tishkoff 2007
Datoga	Tanzania	Nilo-Saharan	1/57	1.75%	Tishkoff 2007 and Knight 2003
Iraqw	Tanzania	Afro-Asiatic > Cushitic	0/12	0.00%	Knight 2003
Sukuma	Tanzania	Niger-Congo	0/32	0.00%	Tishkoff 2007 and Knight 2003
Turu	Tanzania	Niger-Congo	0/29	0.00%	Tishkoff 2007

=== Europe and Asia ===
The downstream phylogeny of the T2 branch, particularly its most prolific subclade T2b, presents significant classification challenges due to a star-like radiation of sub-lineages. Because many downstream mutations occurred in close chronological proximity during rapid prehistoric population expansions, standard hypervariable region (HVR) sequencing often fails to resolve the exact ancestral origins of specific sub-clades. This creates an overlapping migratory signal between Early European Farmers arriving from Anatolia during the Neolithic transition and pastoralists migrating from the Pontic-Caspian steppe during the Bronze Age. Consequently, modern population genetics increasingly relies on Next-Generation Sequencing (NGS) and Full Mitochondrial Sequencing (FMS) of both ancient and contemporary genomes to distinguish the deep evolutionary trajectories of these specific T2 subclades.

Haplogroups T1 and T2 are associated with the Neolithic spread in Europe and Asia. High frequencies of mtDNA haplogroup T are observed among the Udmurts, Russia (16,5%), the Chechens, Russia (12.5%), the Ingush, Russia (12.5%), the Netherlands (12%), and the Kumyks, Russia (10%), Sardinia, and Iceland (all at 10%). Notably high levels are also found in Switzerland (9.5%), Azerbaijan (9.5%), Georgia (9%), Hungary (8.5%), and Ukraine (8.5%). These are followed by Romania at 6%, while the northern Fertile Crescent (Lebanon, Iraq, and eastern Turkey) sits at around 5.5%, and the regions of the South Caucasus (Armenia) range from 4.5% to 5.5%. The southern Balkans (Bulgaria, Macedonia, and Albania) each register at 4.5%, Austria and the Czech Republic at 3.5%.

== Subclades ==
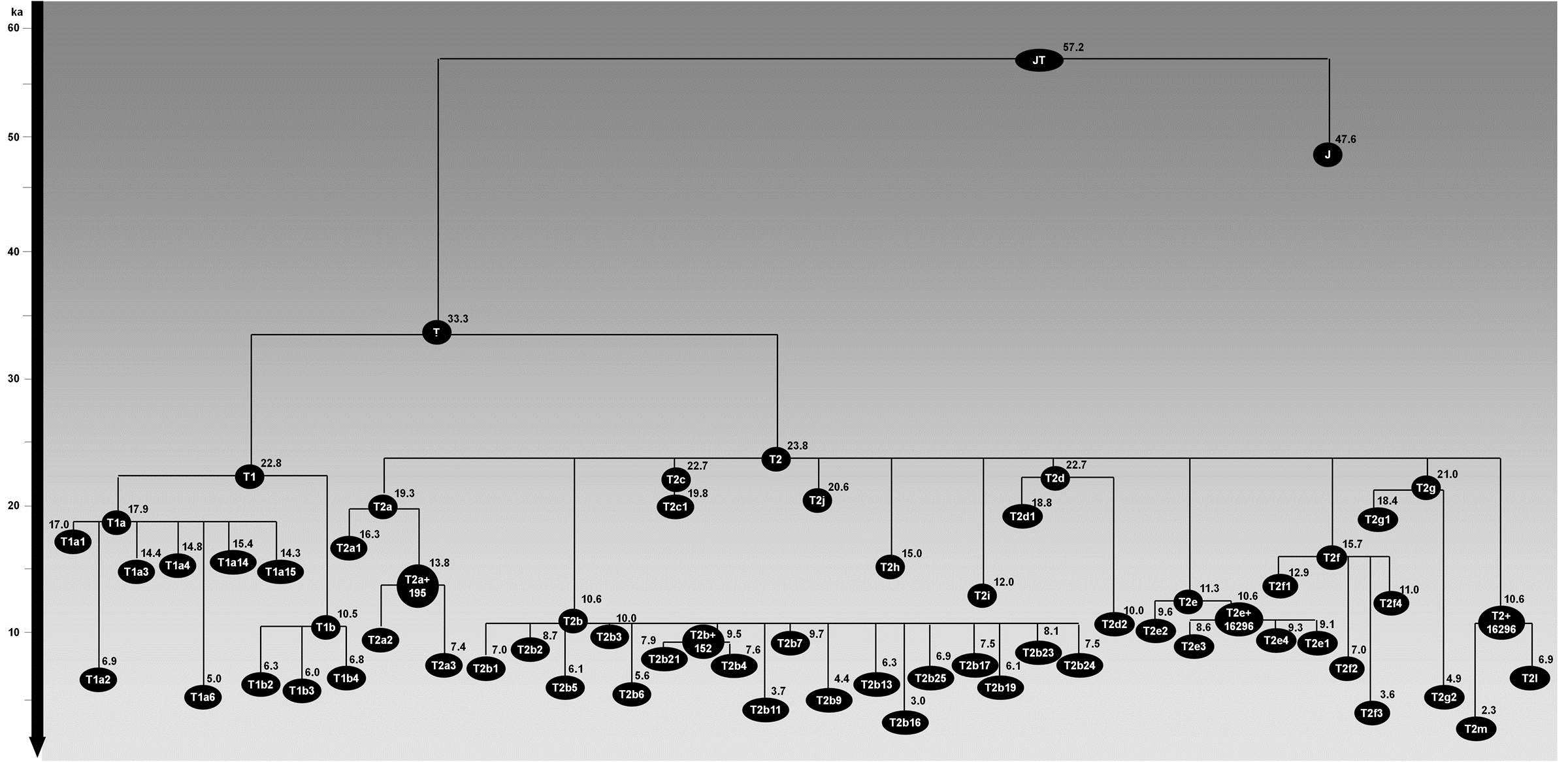
Schematic tree of mtDNA haplogroup T. Ages (in ka) indicated are maximum likelihood estimates obtained for the whole-mtDNA genome.

=== Tree ===
This phylogenetic tree of haplogroup I subclades is based on the paper (van Oven 2008) and subsequent published research (Behar 2012b).

- T
  - T1
    - T1a
      - T1a-T152C!
        - T1a1'3
          - T1a1
            - T1a1a
              - T1a1a1
            - T1a1b
              - T1a1b1
            - T1a1c
            - T1a1d
            - T1a1e
            - T1a1f
            - T1a1g
            - T1a1h
            - T1a1i
            - T1a1j
            - T1a1k
              - T1a1k1
              - T1a1k2
            - T1a1-C152T!!
              - T1a1l
            - T1a1m
              - T1a1m1
            - T1a1n
            - T1a1p
            - T1a1q
            - T1a1r
          - T1a3
            - T1a3a
        - T1a2
          - T1a2a
          - T1a2b
        - T1a4
        - T1a11
        - T1a12
        - T1a13
      - T1a5
        - T1a5a
      - T1a6
      - T1a7
      - T1a8
        - T1a8a
        - T1a8b
      - T1a9
      - T1a10
        - T1a10a
    - T1b
      - T1b1
      - T1b2
      - T1b3
      - T1b4
  - T2
    - T2a
      - T2a1
        - T2a1a
          - T2a1a1
          - T2a1a2
          - T2a1a3
            - T2a1a3a
          - T2a1a5
          - T2a1a6
          - T2a1a7
          - T2a1a8
        - T2a1b
          - T2a1b1
            - T2a1b1a
              - T2a1b1a1
                - T2a1b1a1a
                  - T2a1b1a1a1
                  - T2a1b1a1a2
                - T2a1b1a1b
                  - T2a1b1a1b1
              - T2a1b1a2
          - T2a1b2
            - T2a1b2a
            - T2a1b2b
      - T2a-T195C!
        - T2a2
          - T2a2a
        - T2a3
    - T2b
      - T2b1
      - T2b2
        - T2b2b
          - T2b2b1
      - T2b3
        - T2b3-C151T
          - T2b3a
            - T2b3a1
          - T2b3c
          - T2b3d
          - T2b3e
        - T2b3b
      - T2b4
        - T2b4a
          - T2b4a1
        - T2b4i
        - T2b4-T152C!
          - T2b4b
          - T2b4c
          - T2b4d
          - T2b4e
          - T2b4f
          - T2b4g
          - T2b4h
      - T2b5
        - T2b5a
          - T2b5a1
      - T2b6
        - T2b6a
        - T2b6-T146C!
          - T2b6b
      - T2b7
        - T2b7a
          - T2b7a1
          - T2b7a2
          - T2b7a3
      - T2b8
      - T2b-C150T
        - T2b9
      - T2b11
      - T2b13
        - T2b13a
        - T2b13b
      - T2b15
      - T2b-T16362C
        - T2b16
      - T2b17
        - T2b17a
      - T2b19
        - T2b19b
      - T2b-T152C!
        - T2b21
          - T2b21a
          - T2b21b
        - T2b22
      - T2b23
        - T2b23a
      - T2b24
        - T2b24a
      - T2b25
      - T2b26
      - T2b27
      - T2b28
      - T2b29
      - T2b30
      - T2b31
      - T2b32
      - T2b33
      - T2b34
      - T2b35
      - T2b36
      - T2b37
    - T2c
      - T2c1
        - T2c1a
          - T2c1a1
          - T2c1a2
          - T2c1a3
        - T2c1c
          - T2c1c1
          - T2c1c2
        - T2c1-T146C!
          - T2c1d
            - T2c1d1
              - T2c1d1a
            - T2c1d-T152C!
              - T2c1d2
                - T2c1d2a
          - T2c1e
          - T2c1f
    - T2d
      - T2d1
        - T2d1a
        - T2d1b
          - T2d1b1
          - T2d1b2
      - T2d2
    - T2-C150T
      - T2e
        - T2e1
          - T2e1a
            - T2e1a1
              - T2e1a1a
              - T2e1a1b
                - T2e1a1b1
          - T2e1b
            - T2e1b1
        - T2e2
          - T2e2a
        - T2e5
        - T2e6
        - T2e-T152C!
          - T2e7
      - T2m
    - T2-T16189C!
      - T2f
        - T2f1
          - T2f1a
            - T2f1a1
        - T2f2
        - T2f3
        - T2f4
        - T2f5
        - T2f6
        - T2f7
          - T2f7a
        - T2f8
          - T2f8a
    - T2g
      - T2g1
        - T2g1a
          - T2g1a1
        - T2g1b
      - T2g2
        - T2g2a
    - T2h
      - T2h1
      - T2h2
    - T2i
      - T2i1
      - T2i2
    - T2j
      - T2j1
    - T2k
    - T2l
    - T2n
  - T3

== Health issues ==
One study has shown Haplogroup T to be associated with increased risk for coronary artery disease and dementia.

A few tentative medical studies have demonstrated that Haplogroup T may offer some resistance to both Parkinson's disease and Alzheimer's disease.

One study has found that among the Spanish population, hypertrophic cardiomyopathy (HCM) also referred to as hypertrophic obstructive cardiomyopathy (HOCM) is more likely to happen in those of T2 ancestry than those in other maternal haplogroups. It is unknown whether or not this is specific to this subclaude of haplogroup T or is a risk factor shared by all of haplogroup T. With a statistically significant difference found in such a small sample, it may be advisable for those of known haplogroup T maternal ancestry to be aware of this and have their physician check for evidence of this condition when having a routine exam at an early age. It is usually symptom-less and increases the risk of sudden cardiac death, which often happens to those of as early in life as teenagers and may affect those who are active and have no other risk factors.

Certain medical studies had shown mitochondrial Haplogroup T to be associated with reduced sperm motility in males, although these results have been challenged (Mishmar 2002). According to the Departamento de Bioquimica y Biologica Molecular y Celular, Universidad de Zaragoza, Haplogroup T can predispose to asthenozoospermia (Ruiz-Pesini 2000). However, these findings have been disputed due to a small sample size in the study (Mishmar 2002).

== Famous members ==
American outlaw Jesse James was haplogroup T2. During the BBC One documentary Meet the Izzards, the actor and comedian Eddie Izzard learns that her mitochondrial DNA is of Haplogroup T, specifically the subclade T2f1a1. Henry Louis Gates Jr. belongs to haplogroup T2b2.

=== Royalty ===
The last Russian Tsar, Nicholas II, has been shown to be of Haplogroup T, specifically subclade T2 (Ivanov 1996). Assuming all relevant pedigrees are correct, this includes all female-line descendants of his female line ancestor Barbara of Celje (1390–1451), wife of Sigismund, Holy Roman Emperor. This includes a great number of European nobles, including George I of Great Britain and Frederick William I of Prussia (through the Electress Sophia of Hanover), Anne of Denmark and her son Charles I of England, George III of the United Kingdom, George V of the United Kingdom, Charles X Gustav of Sweden, Gustavus Adolphus of Sweden, Maurice of Nassau, Prince of Orange, Olav V of Norway, and George I of Greece.

== See also ==
=== Genetics ===
- Genealogical DNA test
- Genetic genealogy
- Human mitochondrial DNA haplogroup
- Human mitochondrial genetics
- Human mitochondrial molecular clock
- Mitochondrial Eve
- Population genetics

=== Backbone mtDNA Tree ===
Phylogenetic tree of human mitochondrial DNA (mtDNA) haplogroups

Mitochondrial Eve (L)

L0
L1–6

L1
L2

L3

L4
L5
L6
M
N

CZ
D
E
G
Q

O
A
S
R

I
W
X
Y
C
Z
B
F
R0

pre-JT

P

U
HV
JT
K
H
V
J
T
