= Meet the Izzards =

2014 BBC One documentary

- Genre: Documentary
- Directed by: Harvey Lilley
- Presented by: Eddie Izzard
- Country of origin: United Kingdom
- Original language: English
- No. of series: 1
- No. of episodes: 2

Production
- Executive producer: Eric Harwood
- Producer: Harvey Lilley
- Running time: 60 minutes

Original release
- Network: BBC One
- Release: 20 February – 21 February 2013

Meet the Izzards is a 2014 two-part BBC One documentary in which actor and comedian Eddie Izzard uses genetics to trace Izzard's distant ancestry.

The first part, titled "The Mum's Line", uses Izzard's mitochondrial DNA to trace the maternal line. Izzard thus travels to the Kalahari Desert in Africa, then on to the Middle East, Turkey, Italy, Denmark and finally, England. Prior to traveling to Denmark, Izzard's mitochondrial haplogroup is identified as T2f1a1.

In the second part, titled "The Dad's Line", Izzard's Y-chromosomal DNA lineage is traced. In this episode, Izzard travels to Cameroon, and again returns to England via Saxony, Germany. This episode reveals that Izzard belongs to the Y haplogroup I-M223.
