= Unrepeatable =

Video by Eddie Izzard
- Released: 1994
- Recorded: Albery Theatre, London, United Kingdom
- Genre: Stand-up comedy
- Length: 75 minutes
- Label: Vision Video
- Director: John Gordillo

Eddie Izzard chronology
Live at the Ambassadors (1993)	Unrepeatable (1994)	Definite Article (1996)

Unrepeatable is a performance by British comedian Eddie Izzard. It was filmed on 14 March 1994 at the Albery Theatre, released on VHS and later DVD, and follows her first show, Live at the Ambassadors.

She covers a wide range of topics, including washing routines, cats and dogs, cross dressing, horror movies such as Dracula, and Star Trek, which is typical of her "stream of consciousness" style of comedy.
