= Live at the Ambassadors =

Video by Eddie Izzard
- Released: 15 November 1993
- Recorded: Ambassadors Theatre, London, United Kingdom
- Genre: Stand-up comedy
- Length: 87 minutes
- Label: Universal Pictures
- Director: John Gordillo

Eddie Izzard chronology
Live at the Ambassadors (1993)	Unrepeatable (1994)

Live at the Ambassadors is a video by Eddie Izzard made at her West End debut in 1993 at the Ambassadors Theatre. The show originally had a 4-week run, which was extended twice due to the popularity of the performance. The video led to Izzard being invited to the Just For Laughs Montreal Comedy Festival, awarded a British Comedy Award for "Top Stand Up Comedian", and receiving an Olivier Award nomination for "Outstanding Achievement". Live at the Ambassadors was Izzard's first show made available on VHS, which for many years was out of production and very difficult to come by. Izzard hated her physical appearance on the show, and was also on low performance rights with the copyright owner, and thus a DVD version will never be released. However, it is available on CD from the official Eddie Izzard website.

Fans and critics alike recognise the change in Izzard's comedy over the years; Live at the Ambassadors is an example of Izzard's very early and less confident style of stand-up (during the interval, Izzard comments that the first half was ' a bit clunky at the beginning'). In particular, there is very little evidence of her cross dressing, something that would become a major part of the Izzard 'brand' later in her career, with only simple nail varnish obvious. However, her bizarre sense of humour has remained the same throughout performances, and various themes and ideas that can be seen in later recordings can be identified in Live at the Ambassadors such as Christian hymns (and religion in general), politics, history, cult television and wordplay/oddities within the English language.
