= Victoria Melody =

British visual and performance artist

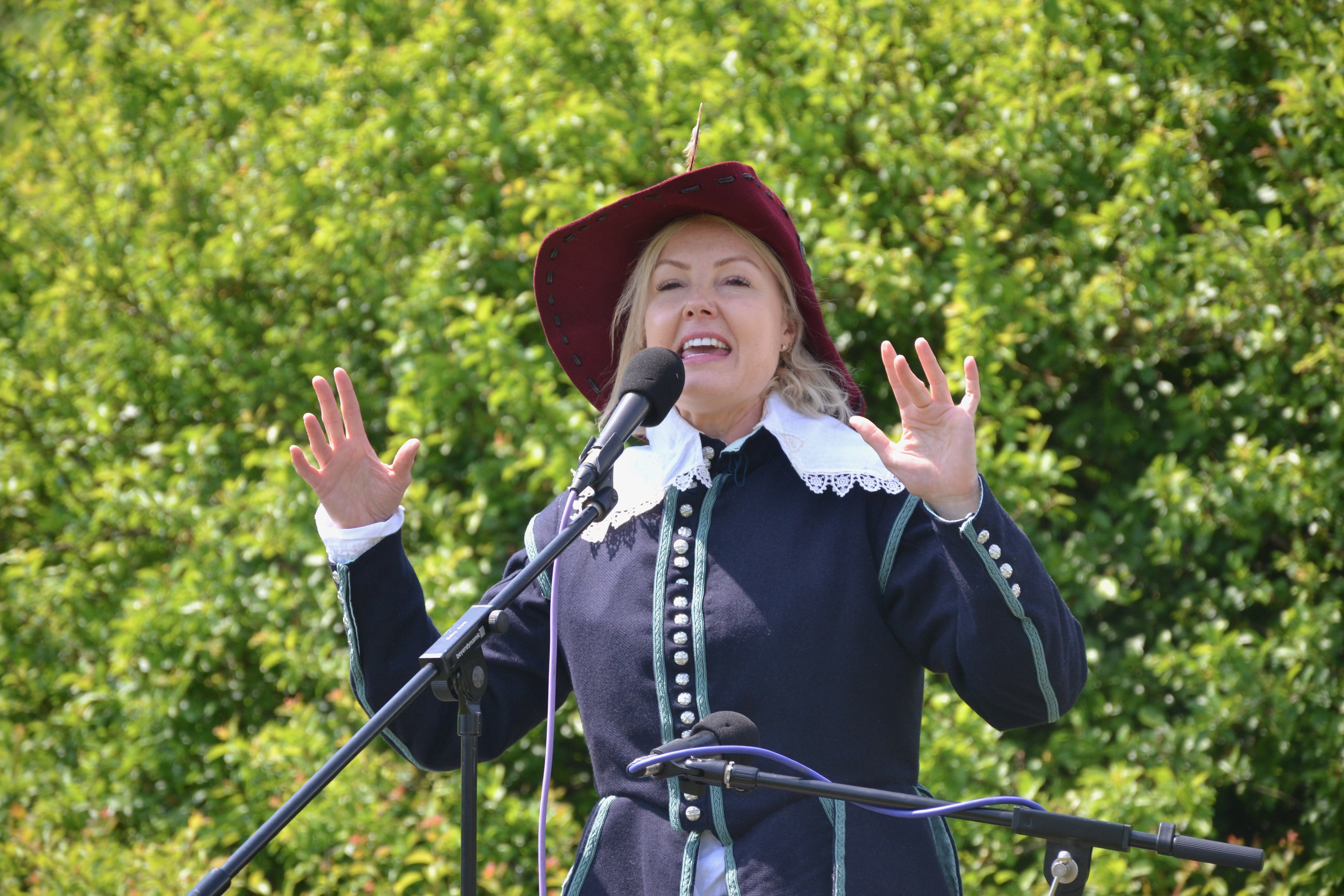
Melody, dressed as Gerrard Winstanley, during Re-enactment in 2024

Victoria Melody is a British visual and performance artist and theatre-maker. Inspired by ethnography, she immerses herself in different communities and 'becomes an active participant in their rituals as research for her work.' The worlds she has explored so far include pigeon fancying, Northern soul dancing, beauty pageants, dog shows, funeral directing, stand up comedy and historical reenactment. Writing in the Oxford Mail in June 2013, Katherine McAlister described Melody as 'a real-life Louis Theroux who gets her hands dirty....Earlier this year you could find Victoria spray-tanned and manicured in her attempt to become Mrs Glamour UK, as well as waking at 5am to begin her dog Major Tom's arduous training schedule in their bid to win Crufts, all of which culminates in her...show Major Tom.'

Melody has presented her work nationally and internationally at venues including Soho Theatre, Oxford Playhouse, The Lowry, Bristol Old Vic, Battersea Arts Centre, Summerhall (Edinburgh Festival Fringe), Push Festival (Canada), Aarhus Festival (Denmark), Bucharest International Theatre Festival (Romania), All For One Theatre Festival, New York, and Virginia Arts Festival (USA), and Brisbane Festival (Australia).

== Early exhibitions ==
Melody has a BA degree in Fine Art from the University of Northumbria in Newcastle and a Postgraduate Diploma in Fine Art from Chelsea College of Art. She first exhibited her work in Southampton, in two solo shows in which she combined film with live performance: All Fur Coat and No Knickers (a space, 2004) and Ventilation (Millais Gallery, 2005). The Millais Gallery catalogue described the theme of her work as 'the ways in which negative emotions are displayed and vented in contemporary society.' In the shows, she filmed herself and members of the public venting their angers and frustrations in their own individual ways. Melody also created a series of alter-egos to express different emotions. As 'Pissed-Off Pumpkin', she dressed as a pumpkin who abused the audience/viewer through a shiny megaphone. 'Bemused Bear', with Melody dressed in a bear costume, was an expression of gloom and loneliness. For her most exasperated character, 'Bastard Bee', she dressed as a childlike representation of a bee, wielding a chainsaw which she used to attack a wooden chair. Melody also took her alter-egos out into the real world. In 2004, Bastard Bee 'occupied a cubicle in ‘The Blue X’ a lap dance club in the centre of Leicester where he gave free one-to one-lap dances with a difference to a mainly male unsuspecting audience.'

== Demographics of a Pigeon Fancier ==
Melody's first 'ethnographic' work was her 2009 exhibition, Demographics of a Pigeon Fancier (Crab Fair, West Cumbria; The Basement, Brighton). This was the result of months spent living with British pigeon fanciers during the racing season. In her research, she gathered data using film, interviews, photography and notes. Melody was interested in the homes fanciers lived in, how much they weighed, and how their hobby affected relationships with family and friends. She met the pigeons and collected fanciers' anecdotes, stories and poems. The show also became a dialogue about regional differences between people living in Egremont, Cumbria, and Brighton. Cumbrians were asked, 'Northerners what do you think about the South?' and Brightonians were asked, 'Southerners, what do you think about the North?' The responses were then delivered to Cumbria and Brighton by homing pigeons.

== Northern Soul ==
The North was also the theme of Melody's next project, an investigation of Northern Soul dancing, in which she visited soul clubs, and learned how to dance in strangers' living rooms. Melody then created her first theatre show, Northern Soul (2012), working with the director Ursula Martinez and the choreographer, Janine Fletcher of The Two Wrongies. The show brought together material from the pigeon and soul projects, with stories from Melody's own childhood in Cheshire. Reviewing the piece in Total Theatre, Thomas Bacon wrote, 'Victoria Melody just wants to join in, and in Northern Soul she presents herself as a sharing artist....The premise of Northern Soul builds upon this sense of sharing as Melody leads us through the documentation of her endeavours to immerse herself in two distinct, yet marginal worlds: Pigeon Fancying and the cult of Northern Soul. Melody celebrates the social oddities of these cultural institutions with a respectful tenderness that resonates with her own peculiarities as she relates her project-work to personal experiences of growing up as an ostracised figure – unpopular in schools and society, and sidelined to a certain extent at home.'

== Major Tom ==
Victoria Melody dressed as Mrs. Brighton, a title she won in 2012

Melody's second theatre show, which premiered in 2013, was an exploration of dog shows and beauty pageants. It was called Major Tom, after her pet basset hound, who appeared on stage with her ('The dog is remarkably placid and never lets his hangdog expression slip. As such he becomes the straight man to Ms Melody's oddball'.) The piece tells the story of Melody's attempt to win the title of Mrs Galaxy UK, while also entering Major Tom for Crufts. Her own process involved intensive physical training and various makeovers, including hypnotherapy, gastric bands, hair extensions and a spray tan. 'The comparisons [to dog shows] are uncanny.' she told Alice Vincent of the Telegraph, "The criteria is the same, the ridiculousness, the absurdity, it's all the same."

Despite being aware of the absurdity of the competition, Melody said, 'I definitely fell for all the promises that people made me to become more beautiful and when I was the most conventionally beautiful I could be, I had the least self-esteem. But somewhere in the process I became a competitor, and I really wanted to win.'

Major Tom was reviewed by Lyn Gardner in the Guardian: 'But what is the right look – whether you are a dog or a human? Who decides? Having simultaneously embarked on a project to turn herself into a beauty queen, Melody sets out to explore these issues – and presents her findings in this dramatised piece....Like Major Tom, she is prodded and primped; like her dog, she has to learn to walk the right way in the show-ring. Major Tom has his balls judged; Melody has her figure and smile assessed. It's a neat parallel, and one that Melody plays with a mixture of inconsequential charm and sly knowingness in a piece that is both startlingly bonkers and utterly ordinary at the same time.'

== Hair Peace ==
Melody's 2015 theatre show, called Hair Peace, was directed by Paul Hodson with dramaturgical guidance from Rachel Chavkin of the New York TEAM theatre company. On the Warwick Arts Centre website, Melody explained how the work developed from the themes of Major Tom: 'During my reign as Mrs Brighton a hairdresser gave me real human hair extensions. This prompted me to ask where the hair had come from, the hairdresser didn't know. Last year HM Revenue and Customs recorded more than £38m worth of human hair entering the country. Right now obtaining that high maintenance preened and pruned and big haired 'The Only Way is Essex look' is big business in the UK. But then why is there little or no information about where and who the hair comes from and if it is ethical? I plan to trace the hair on my head back to the person who grew it and to start a cross-cultural conversation.'

Hair Peace opened at the Pleasance as part of the 2015 Edinburgh Fringe Festival. Donald Hutera, reviewing the show in The Times, wrote that Melody 'must rank as one of the most charming independent performance-makers in Britain — smart, warm, unpretentiously funny and informative, just like the piece itself....She interviews a forensic scientist, travels to India to go on a pilgrimage with a young woman keen to sell her own hair, and exposes the exploitative practices of rampant human hair traffic in Russia. Throughout her journey Melody observes rather than judges those she meets, sharing with us what she's gleaned. It's the human face of social consciousness, with gags. All of the above is accomplished through a combination of direct address, meaning that Melody just talks to us, and judiciously used video footage. The latter provides an unforced emotional climax as we watch, on neighbouring screens, Melody's cousin — a big fan of hair extensions — watching Melody's Indian buddy having her head shaved, which we also get to see. The gentle layering of images and feelings has a quiet but telling impact. On its own modest scale, Hair Peace might change how you think.'

== Ugly Chief ==
In 2016, Melody began work on a new show, Ugly Chief, a literal translation of her name in its original Gaelic (Maoiléidigh). Ugly Chief was a collaboration with the director John Gordillo and her father, the antique dealer, Mike Melody, who regularly appears on daytime television programmes. The inspiration was Mike Melody's mistaken diagnosis with a terminal illness. She wrote, 'When we found out that dad was ok I asked him if he would collaborate with me on a new theatre show – he said yes. We decided that the show would take the form of dad's funeral. In my signature ethnographic approach to creating work I am going to train to become a funeral director to demystify the British funeral system. An aim of the show is to destroy the taboo around talking about death.'

Ugly Chief had its premiere at Battersea Arts Centre on 30 October 2017. In her Guardian review, Lyn Gardner described it as 'a ridiculously enjoyable show, not least because the tension is always apparent between Victoria's desire to exert control and Mike's natural talent for chaos. “You’re not going to like this,” Victoria tells the audience when Dad wrests charge of the second half, creating his dream funeral in which he is buried in a beer barrel in a barbecue pit with the mourners wearing Blackpool FC's tangerine strip, and a band playing his trad jazz favourites. Of course we love it. Just as we love the rest of this generous, funny show...'

== The Enthusiasts ==
In 2022, Brighton Festival commissioned Melody to create The Enthusiasts, in which audiences were "invited into two extraordinary communities for an intimate auditory experience. Taking place at two secret locations across Brighton, these site-specific events uncover communities on the brink of change as their traditional methods clash with new ways of thinking." Funeral Directors was an exploration of Brighton’s death positivity community, with interviews with "characters concerned with dismantling the taboos around talking about death." Pigeon Fanciers, which took place in Brighton's Pigeon Lofts, was an audio experience combining documentary and drama in which audiences met the "real-life characters keeping pigeon fancying aloft".

== Head Set ==
In 2019, Melody began a new project, in which she reinvented herself as a stand-up comic. After taking a course in comedy and making appearances on the open-mic circuit, she discovered that 'she lacked a fundamental understanding of what a joke actually involved'. Struggling to communicate with audiences, her quest for advice led to a diagnosis of Attention deficit hyperactivity disorder. Working with the neuroscientist, Silvana De Pirro, she then began to wear a mobile electroencephalography headset, which monitored her brain activity while performing. Stand up audiences found this unexpectedly hilarious.

In 2022, Melody used the experience to create a new theatre show, Head Set, directed by John Gordillo with dramaturgy by Bryony Kimmings. This was first performed at the Pleasance Courtyard as part of the Edinburgh Fringe. In the Guardian, Catherine Love described Headset as "a comedy act nested within a theatre show. Melody knowingly plays with the two forms, revealing the differences between what we find funny in each.... The structure of the show is also a clever expression of Melody’s joyfully chaotic brain, skittering between images, ideas and the sort of unwieldy props that her comedy instructor discourages."

Melody has described her ADHD diagnosis as "absolutely freeing....This is my brain. I’m not masking anymore. This show is a big celebration of that....And my performance on stage now is the best performance that I’ve ever been able to give."

== Re-enactment ==
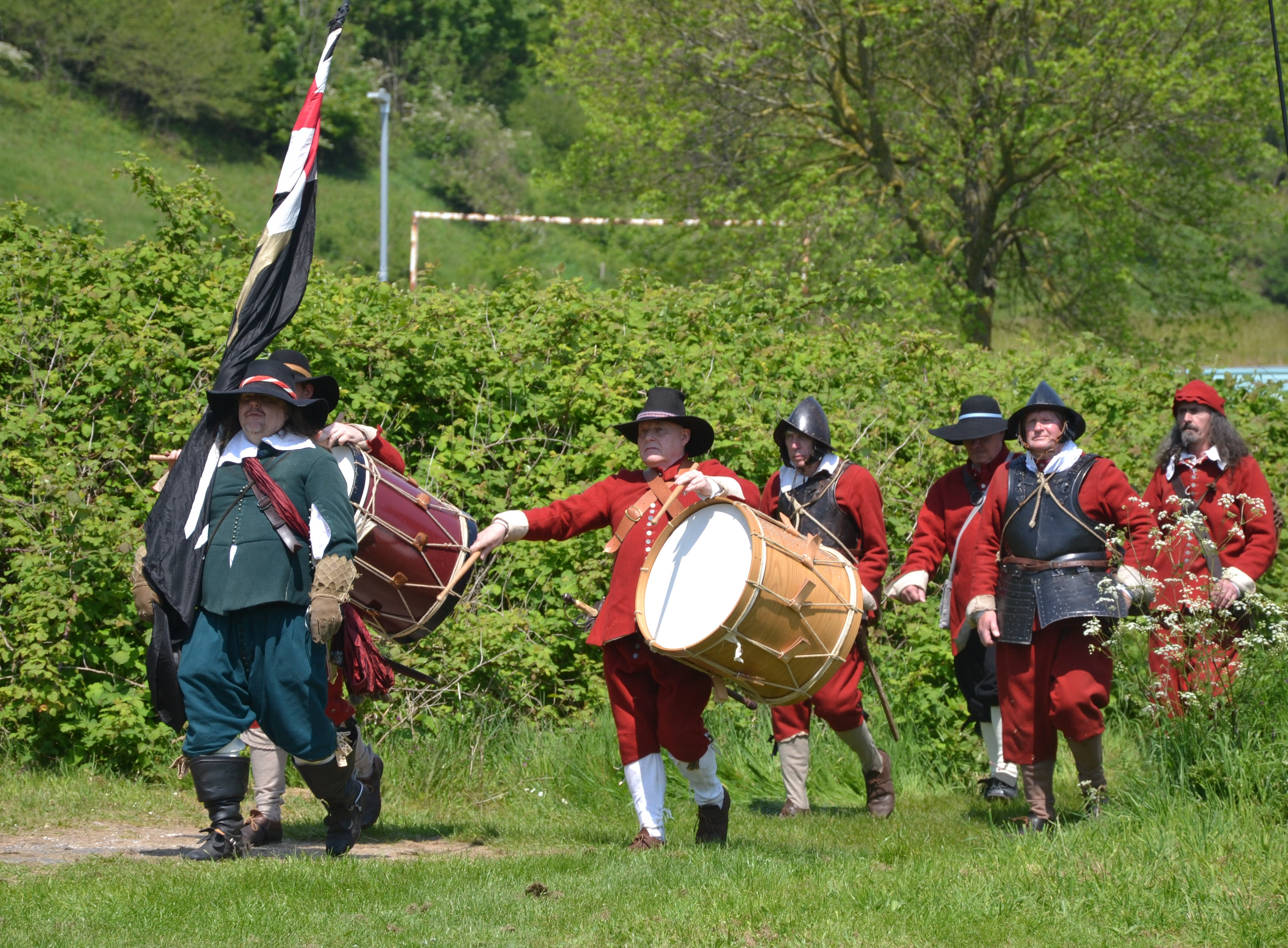
Members of the Marquess of Winchester's regiment during Re-enactment, Brighton 2024

At the end of Headset, Melody announced that she had begun a new project, embedding herself as a musketeer in the Marquess of Winchester's Regiment, an English Civil War re-enactment society. In 2024, Brighton Festival commissioned Melody's Re-enactment, a one-day event, on 11 May, "made with and for east Brighton residents inspired by The Diggers, a campaign group during the English Civil War." East Brighton residents played the role of the Diggers, with Melody as their leader, Gerrard Winstanley. The civil war re-enactors played angry local landowners and soldiers. Locally grown food, cooked by the re-enactors over fires, was served and Mark Thomas and the Brighton Folk Choir led a mass singalong of the Diggers' Song. Melody described the piece as "part re-enactment, part demonstration and part live art piece.” In his blog, JamesofWalsh, of the Folk Choir, wrote, Winstanley "believed “the earth was made a common treasury for all”; many centuries on, land is still in the hands of a tiny elite. Still, today we locals eat food grown locally, by locals, and there is an encampment under the shadow of the Downs. This in itself feels a radical act, and a nod to all the work done by volunteers, activists and food banks in the absence of a functional welfare state."

== Trouble, Struggle, Bubble and Squeak ==
Melody used the story of Re-enactment to create a new theatre show, Trouble, Struggle, Bubble and Squeak, directed by Mark Thomas. She first performed this in the Pleasance courtyard at the Edinburgh fringe festival in August 2025. Natasha Tripney in The Stage described the show as "a heartwarming tribute to the people – the volunteers, artists, activists and people who can’t be arsed waiting for the council to get their act together – who give their time and energy to keep a community afloat when societal safety nets fail." In the Guardian, Mark Fisher wrote that her "retelling of the tale, wide-eyed and ever delighted, is a joyful testament to people power and a heartening parable about the possibility of collective action." Helen Shaw in the New Yorker wrote, "My favorite work in the look-back-to-look-now vein was Victoria Melody’s “Trouble, Struggle, Bubble and Squeak,” a delightfully oddball solo account of her participation in two apparently very different associations: an English Civil War-reënactment society and the community center at a social housing estate...Melody wears a period-appropriate red woolen musketeer’s outfit, and apologizes for her period-inappropriate water goblet (“I’ve got a tankard coming!”), but the shy, tiny, funny woman is really a radical in elf’s clothing, bearing a new message of utopian rebellion."
