= Mongrel Nation =

Mongrel Nation is a 3-part series released in 2003 and hosted by Eddie Izzard on the Discovery Channel, examining the ethnic origins of the English.
