= Stripped (tour) =

Video by Eddie Izzard
- Released: 23 November 2009
- Recorded: Lyric Theatre, London, United Kingdom
- Genre: Stand-up comedy
- Length: 104 minutes
- Label: Universal Pictures
- Director: Sarah Townsend

Eddie Izzard chronology
Sexie (2003)	Stripped (2009)	Force Majeure (2013)

Stripped is the title of a stand-up comedy tour by Eddie Izzard, and is a continuation of her style of comedy, full of "stream-of-conscious banter and predilection for nonsensical detours and frequent tangents." The tour was performed from 28 April to 9 August 2008 with three "warm-up" dates. It has been called "not only hilarious but quite remarkable." As for the name of the tour, Izzard says she called it Stripped because

"The heels got too high on the last two tours. Now I've just gone back to blokey mode, so I've got all this movement back which I couldn't do before. The set is leaner, what I'm wearing is leaner and just focusing on what I'm talking about. I keep talking about God and I come to all these different conclusions. I'm talking about the whole civilization, trying to strip that back, as well. The last 5,000 years we did everything. I put out my idea what we're doing here. I think it's all random. If there is a God, his plan is very similar to someone not having a plan."

Stripped ran for 23 nights at the Lyric Theatre from November to 23 December 2008. The 22 and 23 December dates were recorded for DVD release. From October to December 2009, Izzard took Stripped on tour around the UK—her first UK tour in six years.

In 2010, Izzard performed a limited one-night-only run of Stripped Too in seven American cities. In April and May 2010, Izzard performed Stripped for 13 shows in various Canadian cities as part of her Canadian tour. Izzard performed Stripped Tout en Français in Paris from 15 April to 11 June 2011.

The show also came to Australasia towards the end of 2011, performing several shows across Australia and New Zealand in November and December of that year.

== Tour dates ==
Stripped Tour
- Tour by Eddie Izzard
- Start date: 3 April 2008
- End date: 31 May 2010
- Legs: 3
- No. of shows: 84 in North America; 78 in Europe; 162 in Total

Date	City	Country	Venue
North America
3 April 2008^{[A]}	Santa Fe	United States	Lensic Theater
4 April 2008^{[A]}	Santa Fe	United States	Lensic Theater
15 April 2008^{[A]}	Providence	United States	VMA Arts & Cultural Center
17 April 2008^{[A]}	Louisville	United States	The Kentucky Center
28 April 2008	Boston	United States	Orpheum Theatre
29 April 2008	Boston	United States	Orpheum Theatre
30 April 2008	Boston	United States	Orpheum Theatre
1 May 2008	Washington, D.C.	United States	DAR Constitution Hall
2 May 2008	Washington, D.C.	United States	DAR Constitution Hall
5 May 2008	Philadelphia	United States	Philadelphia Academy of Music
6 May 2008	Philadelphia	United States	Philadelphia Academy of Music
7 May 2008	Philadelphia	United States	Philadelphia Academy of Music
9 May 2008	Cincinnati	United States	Taft Theatre
10 May 2008	Indianapolis	United States	Murat Shrine
13 May 2008	Columbus	United States	Palace Theatre
15 May 2008	Chicago	United States	Chicago Theatre
16 May 2008	Chicago	United States	Chicago Theatre
17 May 2008	Chicago	United States	Chicago Theatre
20 May 2008	Detroit	United States	Detroit Opera House
21 May 2008	Pittsburgh	United States	Benedum Center
22 May 2008	Pittsburgh	United States	Benedum Center
23 May 2008	Cleveland	United States	Playhouse Square Center
24 May 2008	Cleveland	United States	Playhouse Square Center
27 May 2008	Minneapolis	United States	Minneapolis State Theatre
28 May 2008	Minneapolis	United States	Minneapolis State Theatre
30 May 2008	St. Louis	United States	Roberts Orpheum Theater
31 May 2008	Kansas City	United States	Uptown Theater
3 June 2008	Memphis	United States	Orpheum Theatre
5 June 2008	Dallas	United States	Majestic Theatre
6 June 2008	Austin	United States	The Paramount Theatre
7 June 2008	Austin	United States	The Paramount Theatre
8 June 2008	Austin	United States	The Paramount Theatre
10 June 2008	Houston	United States	Jones Hall
11 June 2008	Houston	United States	Jones Hall
13 June 2008	Miami	United States	Jackie Gleason Theater
14 June 2008	Miami	United States	Jackie Gleason Theater
17 June 2008	Tampa	United States	Tampa Theatre
18 June 2008	Tampa	United States	Tampa Theatre
20 June 2008	Nashville	United States	Ryman Auditorium
24 June 2008	Atlanta	United States	Cobb Energy Performing Arts Centre
25 June 2008	Atlanta	United States	Cobb Energy Performing Arts Centre
27 June 2008	New York City	United States	Radio City Music Hall
28 June 2008	New York City	United States	Radio City Music Hall
29 June 2008	New York City	United States	Radio City Music Hall
11 July 2008	Seattle	United States	Paramount Theatre
12 July 2008	Seattle	United States	Paramount Theatre
15 July 2008	Portland	United States	Keller Auditorium
17 July 2008	San Francisco	United States	Orpheum Theatre
18 July 2008	San Francisco	United States	Orpheum Theatre
19 July 2008	San Francisco	United States	Orpheum Theatre
22 July 2008	Phoenix	United States	Orpheum Theatre
23 July 2008	Phoenix	United States	Orpheum Theatre
26 July 2008	Las Vegas	United States	Pearl Concert Theater
29 July 2008	Denver	United States	Paramount Theatre
30 July 2008	Denver	United States	Paramount Theatre
1 August 2008	San Diego	United States	Spreckels Theater
2 August 2008	San Diego	United States	Spreckels Theater
5 August 2008	Los Angeles	United States	Kodak Theatre
6 August 2008	Los Angeles	United States	Kodak Theatre
7 August 2008	Los Angeles	United States	Kodak Theatre
8 August 2008	Los Angeles	United States	Kodak Theatre
9 August 2008	Los Angeles	United States	Kodak Theatre
Europe
11 November 2008^{[A]}	Cornwall	England	Hall for Cornwall
12 November 2008^{[A]}	Porthcawl	England	Porthcawl Grand Pavilion
13 November 2008^{[A]}	Monmouth	England	The Blake Theatre
14 November 2008^{[A]}	Ludlow	England	Ludlow Assembly Rooms
16 November 2008^{[A]}	Bexhill	England	De La Warr Pavilion
17 November 2008	London	England	Lyric Theatre
18 November 2008	London	England	Lyric Theatre
19 November 2008	London	England	Lyric Theatre
20 November 2008	London	England	Lyric Theatre
21 November 2008	London	England	Lyric Theatre
22 November 2008	London	England	Lyric Theatre
23 November 2008	London	England	Lyric Theatre
24 November 2008	London	England	Lyric Theatre
25 November 2008	London	England	Lyric Theatre
26 November 2008	London	England	Lyric Theatre
27 November 2008	London	England	Lyric Theatre
28 November 2008	London	England	Lyric Theatre
29 November 2008	London	England	Lyric Theatre
30 November 2008	London	England	Lyric Theatre
1 December 2008	London	England	Lyric Theatre
2 December 2008	London	England	Lyric Theatre
3 December 2008	London	England	Lyric Theatre
4 December 2008	London	England	Lyric Theatre
5 December 2008	London	England	Lyric Theatre
6 December 2008	London	England	Lyric Theatre
7 December 2008	London	England	Lyric Theatre
8 December 2008	London	England	Lyric Theatre
9 December 2008	London	England	Lyric Theatre
10 December 2008	London	England	Lyric Theatre
11 December 2008	London	England	Lyric Theatre
12 December 2008	London	England	Lyric Theatre
17 December 2008	London	England	Lyric Theatre
18 December 2008	London	England	Lyric Theatre
19 December 2008	London	England	Lyric Theatre
20 December 2008	London	England	Lyric Theatre
21 December 2008	London	England	Lyric Theatre
22 December 2008	London	England	Lyric Theatre
23 December 2008	London	England	Lyric Theatre
26 April 2009^{[A]}	London	England	Pleasance Islington
26 May 2009^{[A]}	Lancaster	England	Lancaster Grand Theatre
27 May 2009^{[A]}	Burnley	England	Burnley Mechanics
28 May 2009^{[A]}	Harrogate	England	Harrogate Theatre
29 May 2009^{[A]}	Worcester	England	Huntingdon Hall
23 October 2009	Nottingham	England	Trent FM Arena
24 October 2009	Nottingham	England	Trent FM Arena
25 October 2009	Sheffield	England	Sheffield Arena
29 October 2009	Newcastle	England	Metro Radio Arena
30 October 2009	Newcastle	England	Metro Radio Arena
31 October 2009	Liverpool	England	Echo Arena Liverpool
1 November 2009	Liverpool	England	Echo Arena Liverpool
4 November 2009	Aberdeen	Scotland	Aberdeen Exhibition and Conference Centre
6 November 2009	Cardiff	Wales	Cardiff International Arena
7 November 2009	Manchester	England	Manchester Evening News Arena
8 November 2009	Manchester	England	Manchester Evening News Arena
10 November 2009	Glasgow	Scotland	Scottish Exhibition and Conference Centre
11 November 2009	Glasgow	Scotland	Scottish Exhibition and Conference Centre
17 November 2009	Birmingham	England	National Indoor Arena
18 November 2009	Birmingham	England	National Indoor Arena
19 November 2009	Cardiff	Wales	Cardiff International Arena
20 November 2009	Cardiff	Wales	Cardiff International Arena
22 November 2009	Bournemouth	England	Bournemouth International Centre
23 November 2009	Bournemouth	England	Bournemouth International Centre
26 November 2009	Eastbourne	England	Devonshire Park Theatre
27 November 2009	Brighton	England	The Brighton Centre
28 November 2009	Brighton	England	The Brighton Centre
29 November 2009	Brighton	England	The Brighton Centre
30 November 2009	Brighton	England	The Brighton Centre
3 December 2009	London	England	The O_{2} Arena
4 December 2009	London	England	Wembley Arena
5 December 2009	London	England	Wembley Arena
6 December 2009	London	England	Wembley Arena
7 December 2009	London	England	The O_{2} Arena
12 December 2009	Belfast	Northern Ireland	Odyssey Arena
14 December 2009	Dublin	Ireland	The O_{2}
18 December 2009	Malmö	Sweden	Malmö Arena
19 December 2009	Stockholm	Sweden	Hovet
20 December 2009	Gothenburg	Sweden	Scandinavium
21 December 2009	Oslo	Norway	Oslo Spektrum
North America
8 January 2010	Chicago	United States	United Center
9 January 2010	St. Louis	United States	Fox Theatre
12 January 2010	Boston	United States	TD Garden
14 January 2010	Oakland	United States	Oracle Arena
16 January 2010	New York City	United States	Madison Square Garden
21 January 2010	Dallas	United States	American Airlines Center
29 January 2010	Los Angeles	United States	Nokia Theatre L.A. Live
30 January 2010	Los Angeles	United States	Nokia Theatre L.A. Live
30 April 2010	Toronto	Canada	Massey Hall
1 May 2010	Toronto	Canada	Massey Hall
2 May 2010	Toronto	Canada	Massey Hall
10 May 2010	Winnipeg	Canada	Burton Cummings Theatre
12 May 2010	Regina	Canada	Conexus Arts Centre
14 May 2010	Calgary	Canada	Southern Alberta Jubilee Auditorium
17 May 2010	Edmonton	Canada	Northern Alberta Jubilee Auditorium
20 May 2010	Victoria	Canada	Victoria Royal Theatre
21 May 2010	Vancouver	Canada	Queen Elizabeth Theatre
22 May 2010	Vancouver	Canada	Queen Elizabeth Theatre
25 May 2010	Montreal	Canada	Théâtre Saint-Denis
28 May 2010	Ottawa	Canada	National Arts Centre
30 May 2010	Toronto	Canada	Massey Hall
31 May 2010	Toronto	Canada	Massey Hall
