= Dress to Kill (Eddie Izzard) =

Video by Eddie Izzard
- Released: 9 November 1998
- Recorded: Orpheum Theatre, San Francisco, California, United States
- Genre: Stand-up comedy
- Length: 114 minutes
- Label: Vision Video
- Director: Lawrence Jordan

Eddie Izzard chronology
Glorious (1997)	Dress to Kill (1998)	Circle (2002)

Dress to Kill is the title of a performance by Eddie Izzard, and is a continuation of the British comedian's surrealist, ideas-based comedy. The VHS was recorded during a performance in San Francisco, California, United States. However, the tour was a global one. During this tour Izzard also wrote the book Dress to Kill with David Quantick (photographs by Steve Double), published by Virgin Books in hardback in 1998 and paperback in 2000.

Izzard's humour includes observations on the American concept of history, beginning with the quote: "I grew up in Europe, where the history comes from" and continuing through diversions about the belief that all Europeans live in castles ("we just long for a bungalow or something") and the attitude of Americans toward historical landmarks. Additionally, Izzard takes time to explain her background as an executive transvestite and how it affected her desire to join the military. This is explained through a proposal for the Army's "first battalion transvestite brigade...with fantastic makeup and a fantastic gun."

The centerpiece of the performance is a retelling of British history from Stonehenge through to the Reformation. This is done with Izzard adopting a very Italian accent (and miming riding on a Vespa) to signify the Pope talking to Henry VIII ("who is Sean Connery for this film") and explaining that he can't marry as many wives as he wants to. This is set against the backdrop of Martin Luther pinning his 95 Theses on the door of Wittenberg Cathedral, a paper that reads "Eine Minuten bitte. Ich habe einen kleinen Problemo avec diese Religione." "He was from everywhere," explains Izzard to great cheers from the audience. Izzard uses the voice of James Mason as the voice of God.

Self-proclaimed film buff Izzard also describes the plot of The Great Escape in a semi-improvised manner, explaining how inaccurate his escape through Central Europe actually is ("within fifteen minutes he's on the borders of Switzerland. This is from Poland! And if you don't know the geography, it goes Poland, Czechoslovakia, Holland, Venezuela, Africa, Beirut, the Hanging Gardens of Babylon, and then Switzerland.").

Diversions are also made in relation to the Heimlich maneuver and the American Dream, while the performance ends with Izzard re-telling the story of how she didn't lose her virginity. In an encore Izzard delivers the plot of the film Speed in schoolboy French.

One of Izzard's most well-known routines was performed during Dress To Kill: a satirical depiction of Church of England fundamentalism, wherein Izzard explains how Church of England fundamentalism would be impossible because people would be shouting out "You must have tea and cake with the vicar or you DIE!" and "CAKE OR DEATH?!" The latter phrase has become so well known that it is now the name of an Eddie Izzard fansite and has inspired a Christian website called Anglican Memes for those who "like gentle fun being poked at the church but are not interested in church-bashing or posting anything offensive."
