= Glorious (Eddie Izzard) =

Video by Eddie Izzard
- Released: 17 November 1997
- Recorded: Hammersmith Apollo, London, England
- Genre: Stand-up comedy
- Length: 99 minutes
- Label: Vision Video
- Director: Peter Richardson

Eddie Izzard chronology
Definite Article (1996)	Glorious (1997)	Dress to Kill (1998)

Glorious is English comedian Eddie Izzard's 1997 performance at the Hammersmith Apollo. The performance was released on VHS — and, later, DVD — and covers topics such as the siege of Troy, Noah's Ark, the British Royal Family, and the birth of baby Jesus. In many ways, the flow of topics follow from the Bible, starting with the beginning of time according to the Old Testament and ending with Armageddon according to the Book of Revelation, though they are covered in Izzard's usual surreal style.
