= Definite Article =

Comedy album by Eddie Izzard

Video by Eddie Izzard
- Released: 21 October 1996
- Recorded: Shaftesbury Theatre, London, United Kingdom
- Genre: Stand-up comedy
- Length: 109 minutes
- Label: Vision Video
- Director: Ed Bye

Eddie Izzard chronology
Unrepeatable (1994)	Definite Article (1996)	Glorious (1997)

Definite Article is the title of British comedian Eddie Izzard's 1996 performance, which was released on VHS and later on DVD. It was recorded on different nights at the Shaftesbury Theatre. Both recordings cover topics such as The Italian Job, Pavlov's dogs, and European languages.

== Trivia ==
At the beginning of the show, Eddie arrives on stage through a huge book which opens to reveal her sitting at the top of a staircase. The backdrop then closes and from then on, the background changes at various intervals with words from selected literature projected onto the pages of the huge book. The chosen selections are:

- A Marriage Proposal (a.k.a. The Proposal) – Anton Chekhov
- Jabberwocky – Lewis Carroll
- Macbeth – Shakespeare
- Mayor of Casterbridge – Thomas Hardy
- Edward II – Christopher Marlowe
- Adolf Hitler: My Part in His Downfall – Spike Milligan
