= Sexie =

Video by Eddie Izzard
- Released: 26 November 2003
- Recorded: Congress Theatre, Eastbourne, United Kingdom
- Genre: Stand-up comedy
- Length: 97 minutes
- Label: Universal Pictures
- Director: Declan Lowney

Eddie Izzard chronology
Circle (2002)	Sexie (2003)	Stripped (2009)

Sexie was a 2003 stand-up comedy tour by Eddie Izzard. The tour covered Australia, New Zealand, the USA, Canada, the United Kingdom and Ireland.

Topics covered on this tour include transvestitism, aeroplanes, superheroes, Greek mythology, the planet Mars, the emergency services, sharks, human evolution, dentists, firemen, horses, and the "Baguetti Western" Blueberry in which she starred as a German cowboy. As an encore, Eddie does her most recent "bad impression", Christopher Walken.

The show was released on VHS and DVD on 26 November 2003 (a month before the end of the tour). This performance was recorded in Eastbourne, England (where her grandfather and father were born and where she went to school) at the start of the tour.

Live from Wembley is another recording from this tour and is sold on iTunes.

The BBFC gave Sexie a '15' rating.
