= Force Majeure (tour) =

- DVD cover art

Video by Eddie Izzard
- Released: 18 November 2013
- Genre: Stand-up comedy
- Length: 85 minutes
- Label: Universal Pictures

Eddie Izzard chronology
Stripped (2009)	Force Majeure (2013)

Force Majeure is the title of a stand-up comedy tour by Eddie Izzard that began in Austria in March 2013. It continued through the UK, Ireland, Russia, South Africa, Canada, Spain, and the United States through the summer of 2014.

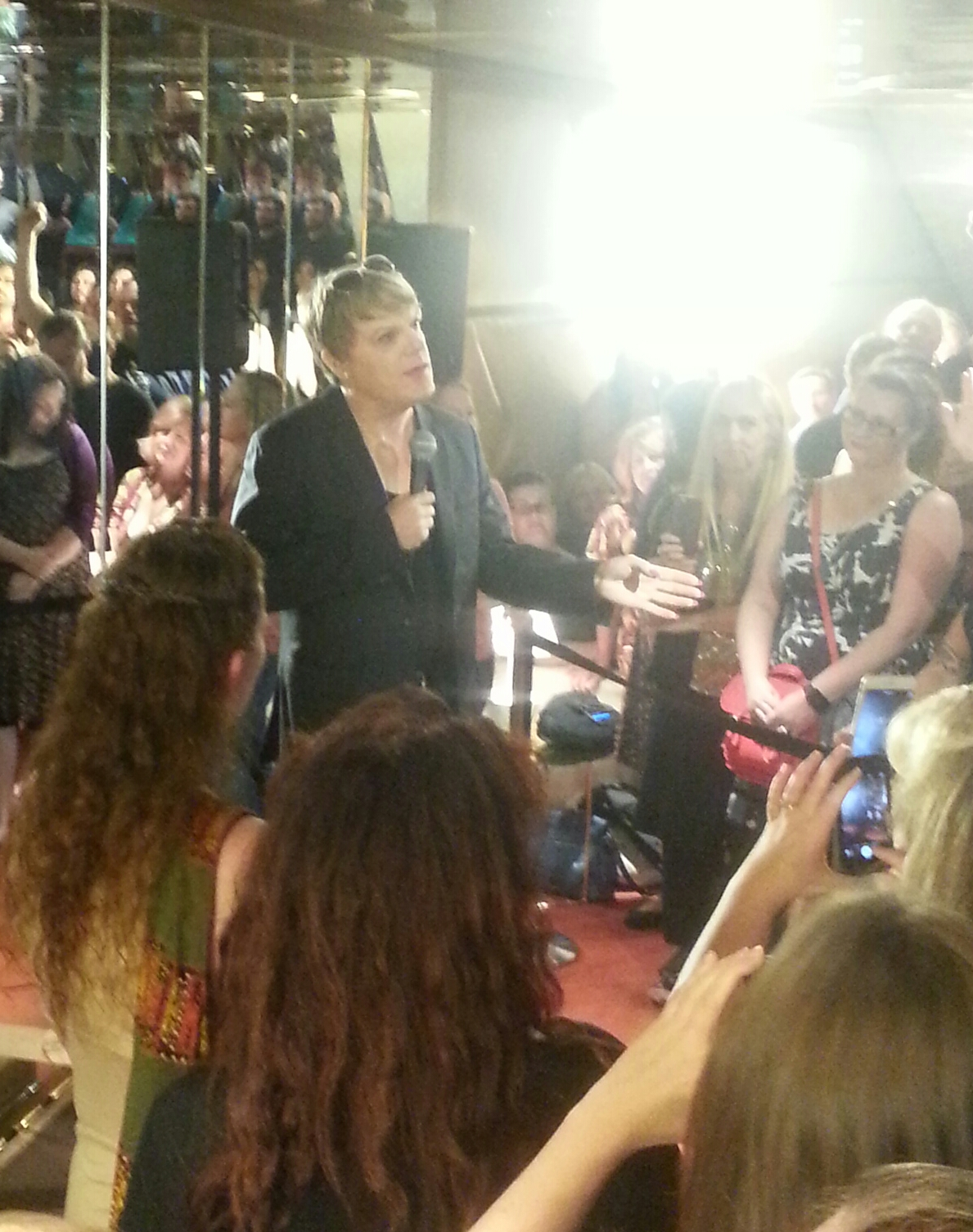
Izzard in the Hamer Hall lobby in Melbourne, Australia, during the tour

The tour was resumed as Force Majeure Reloaded in 2016. During this tour, Izzard delivered a number of performances completely in a language other than his native English, namely French, German, and Spanish. For a series of U.K. performances in May and June 2016 entitled "Force Majeure 3:3:3", each night he in fact performed three separate shows in three languages (German, French, and English, respectively) over three continuous one-hour time slots.

Izzard claims that he has set an "unofficial comedy world record" by ultimately appearing in 45 countries and all 50 U.S. states over the course of the four-year tour. This latter goal was finally accomplished when Izzard performed in Honolulu on 8 March 2017.

Date	City	Venue
Austria
18 March 2013	Mayrhofen	Altitude Comedy Festival
Latvia
19 March 2013	Riga	Riga Congress Hall
Estonia
20 March 2013	Tallinn	Nokia Concert Hall
Croatia
22 March 2013	Dubrovnik	Kazalište Marina Držića
Slovenia
23 March 2013	Ljubljana	Cankarjev dom
Croatia
24 March 2013	Zagreb	Koncertna dvorana Vatroslava Lisinskog
26 March 2013	Osijek	HNK
Serbia
28–29 March 2013	Belgrade	Dom Omladine Beograda
Germany
5 April 2013	Berlin	Admiralspalast
Denmark
8 April 2013	Aarhus	Store Sal, Musikhuset Aarhus
Finland
11 April 2013	Helsinki	Hartwall Arena
Sweden
13 April 2013	Stockholm	Friends Arena
Norway
14 April 2013	Oslo	Oslo Spektrum
Sweden
15 April 2013	Gothenburg	Scandinavium
16 April 2013	Malmö	Malmö Arena
Netherlands
19–20 April 2013	Amsterdam	Heineken Music Hall
Belgium
21 April 2013	Antwerp	Sportpaleis
22 April 2013	Hasselt	Grenslandhallen
Switzerland
25–26 April 2013	Geneva	Geneva Arena
27 April 2013	Zürich	Hallenstadion
Romania
29 April 2013	Bucharest	Sala Palatului
United Kingdom and Ireland
2–3 May 2013	Aberdeen	AECC
4 May 2013	Newcastle	Metro Radio Arena
5 May 2013	Liverpool	Echo Arena
7–8 May 2013	Brighton	Brighton Centre
10 May 2013	Sheffield	Sheffield Arena
11–12 May 2013	London	Wembley Arena
15–16 May 2013	Birmingham	Birmingham NIA
17 May 2013	Cardiff	Motorpoint Arena
18–20 May 2013	Bournemouth	BIC
22–23 May 2013	Nottingham	Capital FM Arena
25 May 2013	Belfast	Odyssey Arena
26 May 2013	Dublin	The O_{2}
29–30 May 2013	Cardiff	Motorpoint Arena
1–2 June 2013	Brighton	Brighton Centre
3 June 2013	Cornwall	Eden Project
5 June 2013	Glasgow	SECC
6–7 June 2013	Manchester	Manchester Arena
8–9 June 2013	London	The O2 Arena
Russia
13 June 2013	St Petersburg	Oktyabrskiy Big Concert Hall
14 June 2013	Moscow	Crocus City Hall
South Africa
18–19 June 2013	Cape Town	Grand Arena
21–22 June 2013	Johannesburg	Sandton Convention Centre
Canada
10–11 November 2013	Halifax, Nova Scotia	Dalhousie Arts Centre
13–16 November 2013	Toronto	Massey Hall
18 November 2013	Ottawa	Canadian Tire Centre
20 November 2013	Thunder Bay	Community Auditorium
22 November 2013	Edmonton	Jubilee Auditorium
24 November 2013	Calgary	Jubilee Auditorium
26 November 2013	Winnipeg	Burton Cummings Theatre
29–30 November 2013	Victoria, BC	The Royal Theatre
2–3 December 2013	Vancouver	The Orpheum Theatre
Germany {In German}
14 January – 27 February 2014	Berlin	Imperial Club
Spain
8–13 April 2014	Madrid	Ancora Madrid
United States
30 April – 2 May 2014	Washington, D.C.	Warner Theatre
3–5 May 2014	Philadelphia	Forrest Theatre
7 May 2014	Newark	NJPAC
8–9 May 2014	Boston	Wang Theatre
12 May 2014	Albany	Palace Theatre
13–15 May & 17–18, 2014	New York City	Beacon Theatre
20 May 2014	Baltimore	Hippodrome
21 May 2014	Raleigh-Durham	Durham PAC
22 May 2014	Charlotte	Belk Theatre
23 May 2014	Atlanta	Fox Theatre
24 May 2014	Nashville	Ryman Auditorium
25 May 2014	Memphis	Orpheum Theatre
27 May 2014	Louisville	Brown Theatre
28 May 2014	Cincinnati	Aronoff Center
29 May 2014	Columbus	Palace Theatre
30 May 2014	Cleveland	Palace Theatre
31 May – 1 June 2014	Pittsburgh	Byham Theater
3 June 2014	Detroit	Detroit Opera House
4 June 2014	Indianapolis	Murat Theater
7–9 June 2014	Chicago	Chicago Theatre
10–11 June 2014	Milwaukee	Pabst Theater
13–14 June 2014	Minneapolis	Orpheum Theatre
16 June 2014	Des Moines	Des Moines Civic Center
17 June 2014	Omaha	Orpheum Theatre
19 June 2014	St. Louis	Fox Theatre
20 June 2014	Kansas City, Missouri	Midland Theatre
21 June 2014	Oklahoma City	Rose State PAC
22 June 2014	Tulsa	Brady Theater
24–25 June 2014	Dallas	Majestic Theatre
27 June 2014	Austin	Long Center
30 June 2014	Houston	Hobby Sarofim Theatre
2 July 2014	San Antonio	Majestic Theatre
Australia
28 January 2015	Sydney	Sydney Opera House Forecourt
31 January 2015	Adelaide	AEC Theatre
2 February 2015	Brisbane	Brisbane Convention Centre
4 February 2015	Perth	Riverside Theatre
7 February 2015	Canberra	Llewellyn Hall
9–10 February & 12, 2015	Melbourne	Hamer Hall
New Zealand
14 February 2015	Wellington	Michael Fowler Centre
16 February 2015	Christchurch	Horncastle Arena
18 February 2015	Hamilton	Claudelands Arena
19–20 February 2015	Auckland	ASB Theatre
Iceland
28 March 2015	Reykjavík	Harpa
United States
19 May 2015	Fargo, North Dakota	Festival Concert Hall
20 May 2015	Sioux Falls, South Dakota	Washington Pavilion
21 May 2015	Rapid City, South Dakota	Rushmore Plaza Civic Centre
22 May 2015	Billings, Montana	Alberta Bair Theater
23 May 2015	Cheyenne, Wyoming	Cheyenne Civic Center
26–27 May 2015	Denver, Colorado	Paramount
28 May 2015	Albuquerque, New Mexico	Kiva Auditorium
29–30 May 2015	Tucson, Arizona	Fox Theatre
31 May 2015	Flagstaff, Arizona	Ardrey Auditorium
2–3 June 2015	Phoenix, Arizona	Orpheum
4 June 2015	San Diego, California	San Diego Civic Theatre
5 June 2015	Santa Barbara, California	Granada
6 June 2015	Los Angeles	Hollywood Bowl
9 June 2015	Fresno, California	William Saroyan Theatre
10 June 2015	San Luis Obispo, California	Christopher Cohen Center (Sidney Harman Hall)
11 June 2015	Bakersfield, California	Fox Theatre
12–13 June 2015	Las Vegas	Pearl Theatre
16 June 2015	Sacramento, California	Community Center Theatre
17 June 2015	Santa Rosa, California	Wells Fargo Theatre
18–20 June 2015	San Francisco	Golden Gate
22–23 June 2015	San Jose, California	California Theatre
25–26 June 2015	Seattle	The Paramount Theatre
27–28 June 2015	Portland, Oregon	Keller Auditorium
30 June 2015	Boise, Idaho	Morrison Theatre
1 July 2015	Salt Lake City	Capitol Theatre
27 August 2015	Lenox, Massachusetts	Tanglewood – Koussevitzky Music Shed
28 August 2015	New Haven, Connecticut	SCSU
29 August 2015	Providence, Rhode Island	The VETS
30 August 2015	Hampton Beach, New Hampshire	Hampton Beach Casino Ballroom
31 August 2015	Port Chester, New York	Capitol Theatre
1 September 2015	Red Bank, New Jersey	Count Basie Theatre
United Kingdom
5 September 2015	Glasgow	Tron Theatre
United States
10 September 2015	Arcata, California	Van Duzer Theater
11 September 2015	Napa, California	Uptown Theater
12 September 2015	Saratoga, California	The Mountain Winery
France {In French}
23 September 2015	Versailles	La Royale Factory
24 September 2015	Lille	Le Spotlight
Luxembourg {In French}
28–29 September 2015	Luxembourg	Theatre Nationale de Luxembourg
Switzerland {In French}
30 September 2015	Lausanne	Le Lido
1 October 2015	Geneva	Uptown Geneva
Belgium {In French}
2 October 2015	Brussels	CC Uccle
France {In French}
4 October 2015	Paris	Le Casino de Paris
5 October 2015	Lyon	Le Rideau Rouge
6 October 2015	Nice	La Comédie de Nice
7 October 2015	Aix-en-Provence	Théâtre La Fontaine d'Argent
8 October 2015	Marseille	Le Quai du Rire
9 October 2015	Montpellier	Le Kawa Théâtre
10 October 2015	Toulouse	La Comédie de Toulouse
12 October 2015	Nantes	La Compagnie du Café Théâtre
13 October 2015	Boulogne	Théâtre de la Clarté
United States
17–18 November 2015	Anchorage, AK	Alaska Center for the Performing Arts, Atwood Concert Hall
28 November 2015	Miami, Florida	The Fillmore Miami Beach
30 November 2015	Clearwater, Florida	Ruth Eckerd Hall
2 December 2015	Orlando, Florida	Walt Disney Theatre
3 December 2015	Jacksonville, Florida	Florida Theatre
5 December 2015	Birmingham, Alabama	Alabama Theatre
7 December 2015	Meridian, Mississippi	Temple Theater
9 December 2015	New Orleans	Saenger Theatre
14 December 2015	Wichita, Kansas	Orpheum Theatre
15 December 2015	Fort Smith, Arkansas	Arcbest PAC
17 December 2015	Athens, Georgia	The Classic Center Theatre
18 December 2015	Charleston, South Carolina	North Charleston PAC
United Kingdom
15–16 January 2016	Bexhill-on-Sea	De La Warr Pavilion
18 January – 20 February 2016, except Sundays	London	Palace Theatre
United Kingdom {Force Majeure 3:3:3}
6 May 2016	Salford	Lowry Studio Space
10 May 2016	Belfast	The Mac
11 May 2016	Cardiff	Chapter Arts
19 May 2016	Cambridge	Junction
20 May 2016	Nottingham	Lakeside
23 May 2016	Birmingham	Mac Arts Centre
25 May 2016	Southampton	Nuffield Theatre
27 May 2016	Bristol	The Lantern, Colston Hall
30 May 2016	Sheffield	The Leadmill
31 May 2016	Millom	The Beggar's Theatre
France {Force Majeure 3:3:3}
6 June 2016	Caen	Pathé Caen Les Rives de l'Orne
United Kingdom {Force Majeure 3:3:3}
8 June 2016	Royal Leamington Spa	Royal Spa Centre Studio
13 June 2016	Colchester	Colchester Arts Centre
14 June 2016	Oxford	The North Wall
17 June 2016	Norwich	Playhouse
19 June 2016	Glasgow	The Stand
United States
15–16 July 2016	Washington, D.C.	National Theatre
18 July 2016	Richmond, Virginia	Carpenter Theatre
20 July 2016	Charleston, West Virginia	Clay Center
21 July 2016	Wilmington, Delaware	The Playhouse
22–23 July 2016	New York	Beacon Theatre
26 July 2016	Hartford, Connecticut	The Bushnell
29 July 2016	Burlington, Vermont	Flynn Center
30 July 2016	Portland, Maine	State Theatre
31 July 2016	Concord, New Hampshire	Capitol Center
United Kingdom
2 October 2016	Isle of Wight	Shanklin Theatre
Spain
11–14 November 2016	Barcelona	Cafè-Teatre Llantiol
Turkey
16 November 2016	Istanbul	UNIQ Hall
Belgium
17 November 2016	Antwerp	Stadsschouwburg Antwerpen
Netherlands
18 November 2016	Amsterdam	Koninklijk Theater Carré
Denmark
19 November 2016	Copenhagen	Falconer Theatre
Netherlands
20 November 2016	Amsterdam	Koninklijk Theater Carré
Spain
22–23 November 2016	Barcelona	Cafè-Teatre Llantiol
29 November – 2 December 2016	Barcelona	Cafè-Teatre Llantiol
Switzerland
4 December 2016	Zürich	Kongresshaus Zürich
Czech Republic
5 December 2016	Prague	Kongresové centrum Praha
Iceland
6 December 2016	Reykjavík	Harpa
Spain
8–11 December 2016	Madrid	Ancora Madrid
13–17 December 2016	Madrid	Ancora Madrid
20–21 December 2016	Madrid	Ancora Madrid
United States
29 December 2016	Thackerville, Oklahoma	Global Event Center
Spain
10–11 January, 13–18 & 20–22, 2017	Barcelona	Cafè-Teatre Llantiol
27–29 January & 31; 1 February 2017	Madrid	Ancora Madrid
Spain {In Spanish}
2–3 February 2017	Madrid	Ancora Madrid
India
15 February 2017	Mumbai	Bal Gandharva Rang Mandir
16 February 2017	Bengaluru	Ambedkar Bhavan
17 February 2017	New Delhi	NCUI Auditorium (opp. Siri Fort)
Nepal
18 February 2017	Kathmandu	The British School
Malaysia
21 February 2017	Kuala Lumpur	Galaxy Hall, HGH Convention Centre
Hong Kong
23 February 2017	Hong Kong	Academic Community Hall, HKBU
China
24 February 2017	Shanghai	The Mixing Room at the Mercedes Benz Arena
Japan
25 February 2017	Tokyo	Tamagawa Kuminkaikan
Singapore
27 February 2017	Singapore	University Cultural Centre (UCC) Hall, NUS
Thailand
28 February 2017	Bangkok	KBank Siam Pic-Ganesha
Indonesia
3 March 2017	Badung	Grand Ballroom of the Trans Resort Bali
Singapore
5 March 2017	Singapore	University Cultural Centre (UCC) Hall, NUS
United States
8 March 2017	Honolulu, HI	Hawaii Theatre
10 March 2017	Kahului, HI	Castle Theatre, Maui Arts and Cultural Center
United Kingdom {Force Majeure 3:3:3}
16 March 2017	Belfast	The Mac
17–18 March 2017	London	Soho Theatre
20 March 2017	Cardiff	The Glee
22 March 2017	Edinburgh	The Stand
23 March 2017	Salford Quays	The Lowry
Slovakia
25 March 2017	Bratislava	Istropolis
Hungary
27 March 2017	Budapest	Kongresszusi Központ Budapest
Portugal
28 March 2017	Lisbon	Tivoli Theatre (Lisbon)
Israel
30 March 2017	Tel Aviv	The Shlomo Center
Poland
2 April 2017	Warsaw	Klub Palladium
Bulgaria
3 April 2017	Sofia	National Palace of Culture
Ukraine
4 April 2017	Kyiv	Atlas
United Arab Emirates
27 April 2017	Dubai	Dubai World Trade Centre
Norway
28 April 2017	Oslo	Oslo konserthus
United Kingdom
25 May 2017	Hay-on-Wye	Hay Festival
Germany {In German}
12 July 2017	Berlin	Quatsch Comedy Club
13 July 2017	Düsseldorf	Savoy Theater Düsseldorf
14 July 2017	Munich	Freiheizhalle
15 July 2017	Hamburg	The Stage Club
16 July 2017	Stuttgart	Im Wizemann
