= Circle (Eddie Izzard) =

Video by Eddie Izzard
- Released: 18 November 2002
- Recorded: Belasco Theatre, New York City, United States
- Genre: Stand-up comedy
- Length: 82 minutes
- Label: Vision Video
- Director: Anastasia Pappas

Eddie Izzard chronology
Dress to Kill (1998)	Circle (2002)	Sexie (2003)

Circle is the name of a stand-up tour by the comedian Eddie Izzard in 2000.

It was released on VHS and DVD in the United Kingdom on 18 November 2002. The video includes Eddie performing a French version of her show with English subtitles.

The performance features many of Izzard's traditional themes, particularly religion (or "philosophies with some good ideas, and some very weird ones"). A discussion about Jesus' role in the three main Abrahamic faiths sees her "waiting offstage" in Judaism and playing on the same sporting team as Muhammad in Islam. This is counterpointed with a dialogue between a Crusader and her enemy in which both men are trying to kill the other "in the name of Jesus". She also mentions her impression that in Buddhism, Jesus is "Buddha's baby brother Benny".

The rigidity of religion is also lampooned, particularly as it relates to the Renaissance. Galileo's persecution by the Catholic Church is mentioned, although the man is eventually asked (in prison) "Galileo, Galileo, will you do the fandango?"

Several concepts featured in "Circle" have become well known among Izzard fans. Among these is a discussion of the Pope, specifically the names chosen by new popes, with the idea being that Popes John and John Paul will eventually be followed by Pope John Paul George and Ringo. A subsequent sequence talks about the renaming of a wartime pope as "Pope Gutless Bastard I" due to his refusal to condemn Adolf Hitler.

Another famous rant involves another appearance of "God and Jesus" (where God is represented by a James Mason impression). Among other issues, this dialogue involves God questioning the wisdom of Jesus being born on Christmas Day and dying at Easter, as well as involving "cannibalism" and "vampirism" in the new religion. The sequence culminates in suggestions of what else could have been used at the Last Supper, most notably "take these oysters, for they are my kneecaps".

Perhaps the most quoted part of the routine, however, is Izzard's "Death Star Canteen", derived from Izzard's observation that there had to be some sort of source of food (such as a cafeteria) on the Death Star in the Star Wars movies. This observation results in an extended dialogue in which Darth Vader is attempting to order "Penne all'arrabbiata" for lunch, only to be forced to get a tray (which is wet) and later be forced to admit that he is "Jeff Vader" in order to get respect.
