= Eddie Izzard =

British comedian and actress (born 1962)

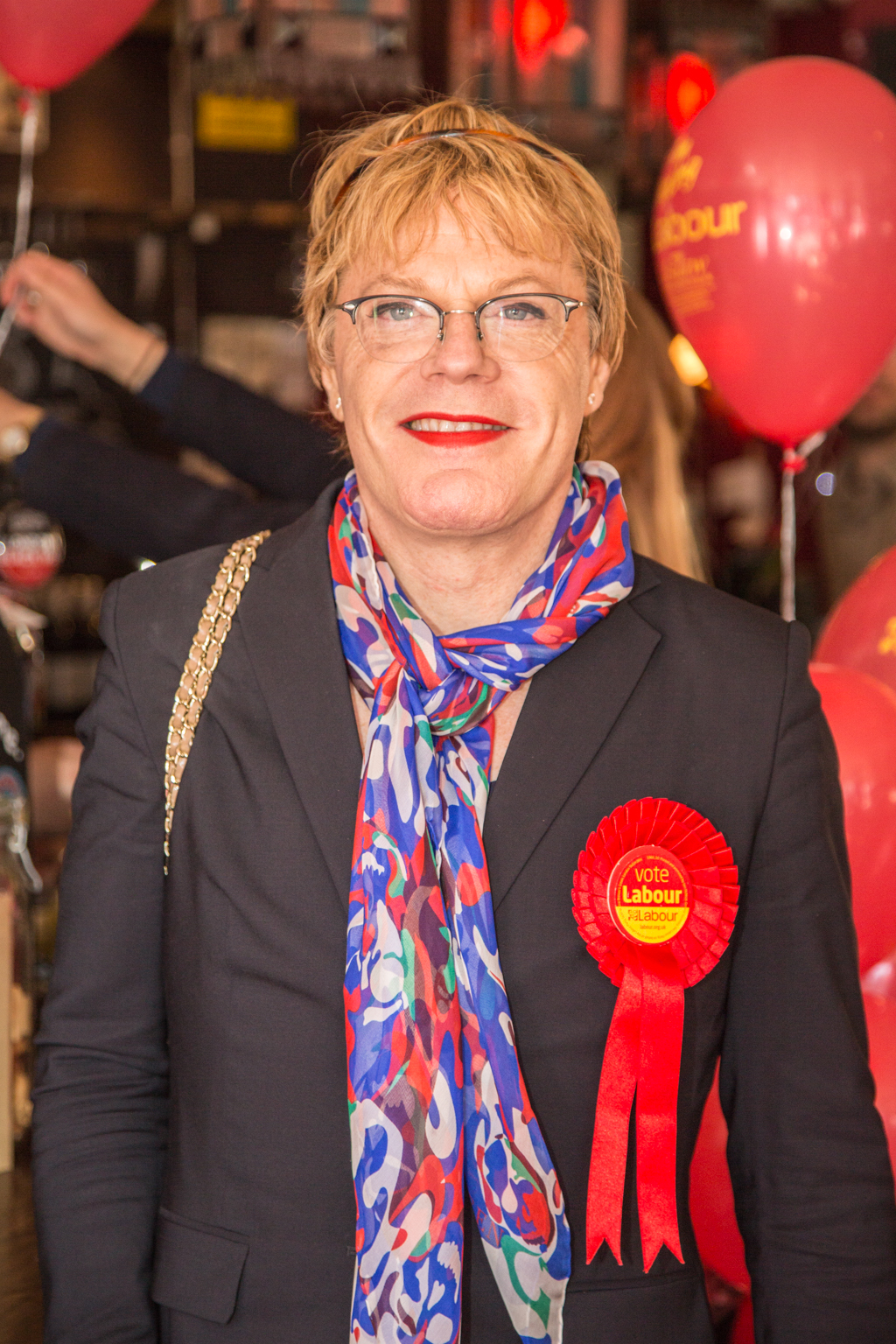
- Izzard in 2015
- Born: Edward John Izzard; 7 February 1962 (age 64); Aden, Aden Colony
- Other name: Suzy Eddie Izzard
- Occupations: Comedian; actress; activist

Comedy career
- Years active: 1982–present
- Medium: Stand-up; television; film
- Genres: Observational comedy; surreal comedy; dark comedy; satire; pantomime
- Subjects: Popular culture; stream of consciousness; religion; language; queer culture
- Website: eddieizzard.com

Suzy Eddie Izzard (Note: Izzard went by Eddie as a personal name until 2023, when she prepended it with Suzy, saying that she is happy to go by either name: "People can choose what they want. They can't make a mistake. They can't go wrong." She continues to use Eddie in professional contexts.) (/ˈɪzɑːrd/ IH-zard; born Edward John Izzard, 7 February 1962) is a British stand-up comedian, actress and activist. Her (Note: Izzard identifies as genderfluid and prefers she/her pronouns but "doesn't mind" he/him. This article uses she/her for consistency.) comedic style takes the form of what appears to the audience as rambling whimsical monologues.

Izzard's stand-up comedy tours have included Live at the Ambassadors (1993), Definite Article (1996), Glorious (1997), Dress to Kill (1998), Circle (2000), Stripped (2009), Force Majeure (2013) and Wunderbar (2022). She starred in the television series The Riches (2007–2008) and has appeared in numerous films, including Ocean's Twelve (2004), Ocean's Thirteen (2007), Valkyrie (2008), Absolutely Anything (2015) and Six Minutes to Midnight (2020). Izzard has also worked as a voice actor on films such as Five Children and It (2004), The Wild (2006), Cars 2 (2011), Rock Dog (2016), The Lego Batman Movie (2017) and the Netflix original series Green Eggs and Ham (2019). Among various accolades, she won two Primetime Emmys for Dress to Kill and was nominated for a Tony Award for her Broadway performance in A Day in the Death of Joe Egg.

In 2009, Izzard completed 43 marathons in 51 days for Sport Relief, despite having no history of long-distance running. In 2016, she ran 27 marathons in 27 days in South Africa in honour of Nelson Mandela, raising £1.35 million. In addition to her native English, she has performed stand-up in Arabic, French, German, Russian and Spanish, and is an active supporter of Europeanism and the European Union.

A dedicated Labour Party activist, Izzard twice ran unsuccessfully for the party's National Executive Committee and then joined as the most successful initially non-elected person after Christine Shawcroft resigned in March 2018. In 2022 and 2023, Izzard attempted to become the party's prospective parliamentary candidate (for Sheffield Central and Brighton Pavilion respectively); she was not selected in the members' ballots.

== Early life and education ==
Izzard was born Edward John Izzard in Aden (then in Aden Colony and now in Yemen) on 7 February 1962, to English parents Dorothy Ella Izzard (1927–1968) and Harold John Michael Izzard (1928–2018). Their surname is of French Huguenot origin. Dorothy was a midwife and nurse, while Harold was an accountant who was working in Aden for British Petroleum at the time of Edward's birth. A brother, Mark, was born two years earlier.

When Izzard was a year old, the family moved to Northern Ireland and settled in Bangor, where they lived until Izzard was five. The family then moved to Wales, where they lived in Skewen.

Izzard was six when her mother died of cancer. The siblings built a model railway to occupy their time while their mother was ill, which was later donated to Bexhill Museum in 2016. Following the death, Izzard attended the private St John's School in Newton, St Bede's Prep School in Eastbourne, and Eastbourne College. She has said that she knew she was transgender at the age of four, after watching a boy being forced to wear a dress by his sisters, and knew she wanted to be an actor at the age of seven.

She studied drama at the University of Sheffield.

== Career ==
=== Comedy ===
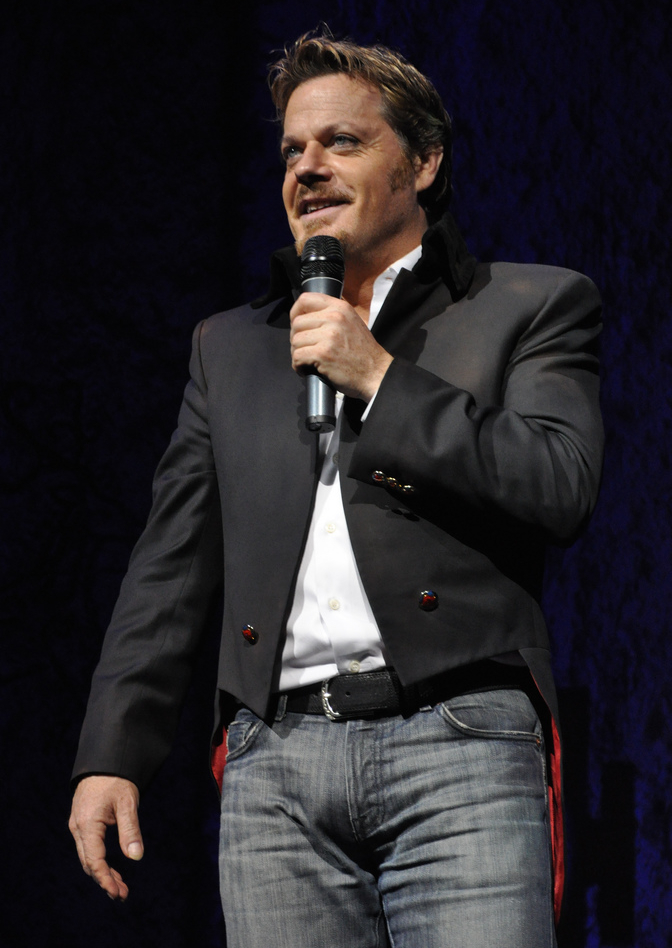
Izzard performing in December 2008

Izzard began to toy with comedy while at university with her friend Rob Ballard. The two took their act to the streets, often in the Covent Garden district of London. After splitting with Ballard, Izzard spent a great deal of the early 1980s working as a street performer in Europe and the United States. She says that she developed her comedic voice by talking to the audience while doing solo escape acts. She then moved her act to the stand-up comedy venues of Britain, performing her routine for the first time at the Banana Cabaret in London's Balham area.

In 1987, Izzard's first stage appearance was at the Comedy Store in London. She refined her comedy material throughout the 1980s and began earning recognition through improvisation in the early 1990s, in part at her own club, Raging Bull in Soho. Her breakthrough came in 1991 after she performed her "raised by wolves" routine on the televised Hysteria 3 AIDS benefit.

In 2000, for the comedy special Dress to Kill, Izzard won two Primetime Emmy Awards: Outstanding Individual Performance in a Variety or Music Program and Outstanding Writing for a Variety or Music Program, while the special was nominated for Outstanding Variety, Music, or Comedy Special.

Izzard is fluent in French and has performed stand-up shows in the language; since 2014, she has also started to perform in Arabic, German, Russian and Spanish, languages that she did not previously speak.

=== Acting ===
In 1994, Izzard's West End drama debut as the lead in the world premiere of David Mamet's The Cryptogram with Lindsay Duncan, in the production at London's Comedy Theatre. The success of that role led to a second starring role, in David Beaird's black comedy 900 Oneonta. In 1995, she portrayed the title character in Christopher Marlowe's Edward II.

In 1998, Izzard appeared briefly on stage with Monty Python in The American Film Institute's Tribute to Monty Python (also referred to as Monty Python Live at Aspen). As part of an inside joke, she walked on stage with the five surviving Pythons and was summarily escorted off by Eric Idle and Michael Palin when attempting to participate in a discussion about how the group got together. In July 2014, she appeared on stage with Monty Python during their live show Monty Python Live (Mostly) as the special guest in their "Blackmail" sketch.

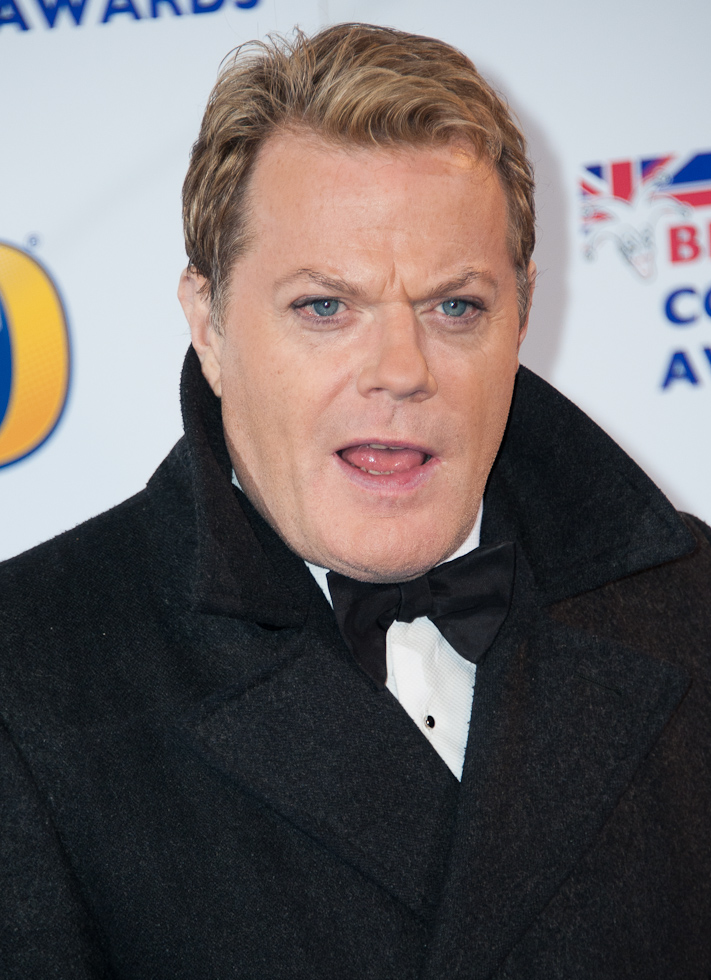
Izzard in 2013

Izzard portrayed comedian Lenny Bruce in the 1999 production of Julian Barry's 1971 play Lenny. In 2001, she replaced Clive Owen in Peter Nichols' 1967 play A Day in the Death of Joe Egg at the Comedy Theatre. Izzard and Victoria Hamilton repeated their lead roles when the show was brought to Broadway in 2003 in the Roundabout Theatre Company production. The revival received four Tony Award nominations, including Best Revival of a Play, Best Leading Actor and Best Leading Actress for its stars Izzard and Hamilton in their Broadway debuts, and Best Direction for Laurence Boswell. In June 2010, she replaced James Spader in the role of Jack Lawson in David Mamet's play Race on Broadway.

Izzard has appeared in numerous films, starting with The Secret Agent in 1996, and has appeared as several real-life individuals, including Charlie Chaplin in The Cat's Meow, actor Gustav von Wangenheim in Shadow of the Vampire, General Erich Fellgiebel in Valkyrie and wartime pioneer of radar Robert Watson-Watt in the BBC drama film Castles in the Sky. Other roles have included Mr Kite in Across the Universe, Lussurioso in Revengers Tragedy and criminal expert Roman Nagel in Ocean's Twelve and Ocean's Thirteen. Her voice work has included the titular "It" in Five Children and It, Nigel in The Wild and the mouse warrior Reepicheep in The Chronicles of Narnia: Prince Caspian. Izzard declined to reprise the role as Reepicheep, a role understudied by Simon Pegg in The Chronicles of Narnia: The Voyage of the Dawn Treader. Izzard has stated that she felt she learned to act while working on the film Circus.

In 2009, Izzard was the subject of Sarah Townsend's documentary Believe: The Eddie Izzard Story, which addresses BBC's Watchdog reporting of "recycling material from an old tour".

Izzard appeared in the 2009 BBC science fiction miniseries The Day of the Triffids, based on the 1951 novel, alongside Jason Priestley, Vanessa Redgrave, Joely Richardson, Dougray Scott and Brian Cox. She played Dr. Hatteras, a sceptical psychology professor, in the Showtime series United States of Tara and appeared in six episodes of the 2013–15 American psychological horror television series Hannibal as Dr. Abel Gideon. In 2021, she appeared in the television series The Lost Symbol based on Dan Brown's 2009 novel of the same name.

At the London 2012 Paralympic Games, Izzard presented the medals to the athletes who had won the 800m T54 race, including gold medalist David Weir.

She has appeared on a number of episodes of BBC One's Have I Got News for You and as a guest on The Daily Show. In 2017, she read excerpts from her autobiography Believe Me for BBC Radio 4's Book of the Week.

From 25 January to 3 March 2024, Izzard performed a one-person version of Shakespeare's Hamlet, adapted by her brother Mark and directed by Selina Cadell, at the Greenwich House Theater in New York. The run was extended three times. The show transferred to Riverside Studios, London, with previews from 23 May 2024.

== Charity work ==
Flag used by Izzard to represent Northern Ireland during the 2009 Sport Relief marathon. The dark green background references the Northern Ireland football jersey, while the white dove symbolises peace.

Flag carried by Izzard during the Sport Relief Mile event in 2010.

On 27 July 2009, with only five weeks' training and no significant prior running experience, Izzard began seven weeks of back-to-back marathon runs (with Sundays off) across the UK to raise money for Sport Relief. She ran from London to Cardiff to Belfast to Edinburgh and back to London, carrying the flag of the country—England, Scotland, or Wales—in which she was running. In Northern Ireland, she carried a self-designed green flag bearing a white dove. The blog Eddie Iz Running documented the 43 marathons in 51 days, covering at least 27 miles per day (totalling more than 1,100 miles), ending on 15 September 2009. The BBC reported that Izzard took 5 to 10 hours per marathon. Izzard received a special award at BBC Sports Personality of the Year in 2009 for these achievements. In March 2010, she took part in the Sport Relief Mile event.

On 16 February 2016, the BBC announced that Izzard would attempt to run 27 marathons in 27 days through South Africa for Sport Relief. The significance of the number 27 came from the number of years Nelson Mandela was held in prison. In total, she would aim to run more than 700 miles in temperatures of up to 40 °C. Izzard had attempted such a project in South Africa in 2012, but withdrew due to health concerns. She completed the first marathon on 23 February 2016, completing the marathon challenge on 20 March 2016 at the statue of Mandela in front of the Union Buildings in Pretoria. Because she had spent a day in hospital, she had to run two consecutive marathons on this last day. She raised more than £1.35M for Sport Relief. A BBC documentary detailing the feat was broadcast on 28 March.

On 8 December 2020, Izzard announced that she would attempt to run 31 marathons and perform 31 stand-up gigs, in the 31 days of January 2021 to raise money for a range of charities including Fareshare, Walking With The Wounded, Care International, United to Combat Neglected Tropical Diseases and Covenant House. The series of marathons raised in excess of £275,000.

== Activism ==
=== Political views ===
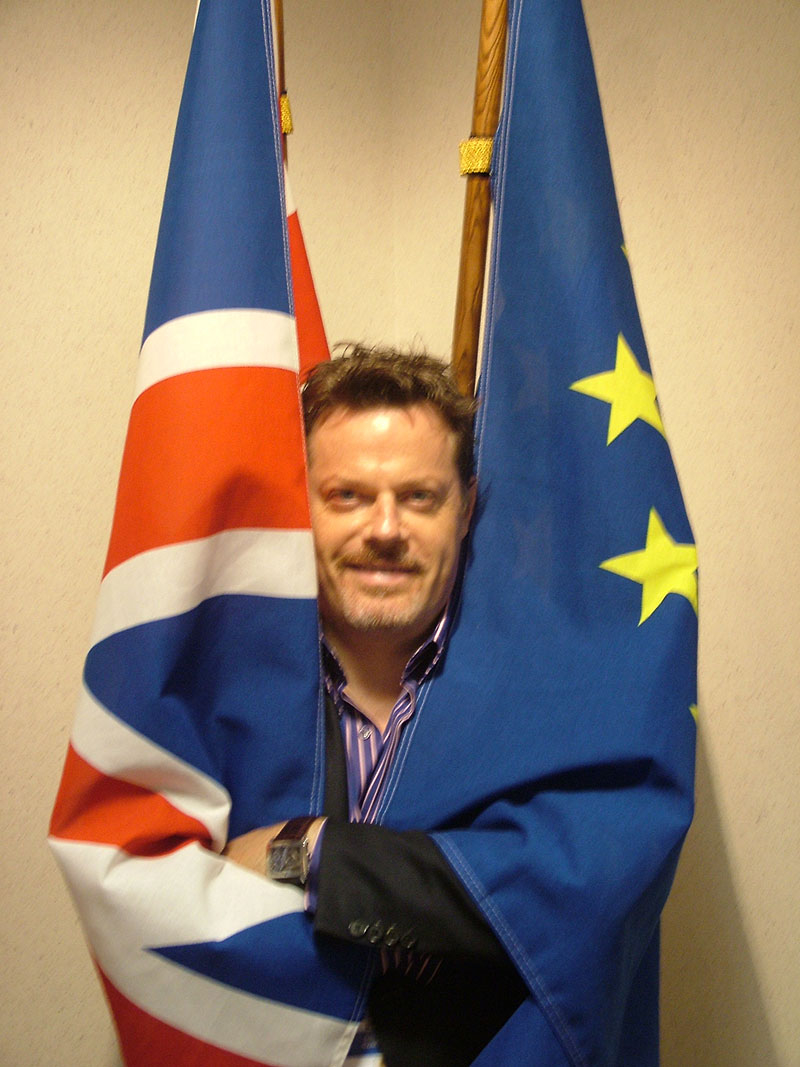
Izzard with the flags of the UK and European Union in 2006

Izzard is a vocal supporter of Europeanism and European integration, and has campaigned in support of the European Union. In May 2005, she appeared on the BBC's political debate show Question Time, describing herself as a "British-European", comparing this with other cultural identities such as "African-American". As part of her campaigning, Izzard was one of the first people to spend a euro in London. This pan-European approach has influenced her work, regularly performing in French and occasionally in German. On a June 2017 episode of Real Time with Bill Maher, she noted she was working in English, French, German and Spanish.

Izzard campaigned in favour of replacing first-past-the-post with the alternative vote as a system for electing MPs in a 2011 referendum and is a supporter of the Labour Campaign for Electoral Reform. She is also a proponent of British republicanism, believing that the UK should have a democratically elected head of state instead of a monarchy. She has stated that she is a social democrat, but not a socialist. During the 2014 Scottish independence referendum, Izzard led a campaign encouraging Scottish people not to vote for independence and said the rest of the UK would feel a "deep sense of loss" if Scotland were to leave.

Izzard campaigned unsuccessfully against the closure of the departments of Drama and Languages, Linguistics and Translation at the University of East Anglia, although the department of Drama was later reprieved.

=== Labour Party ===
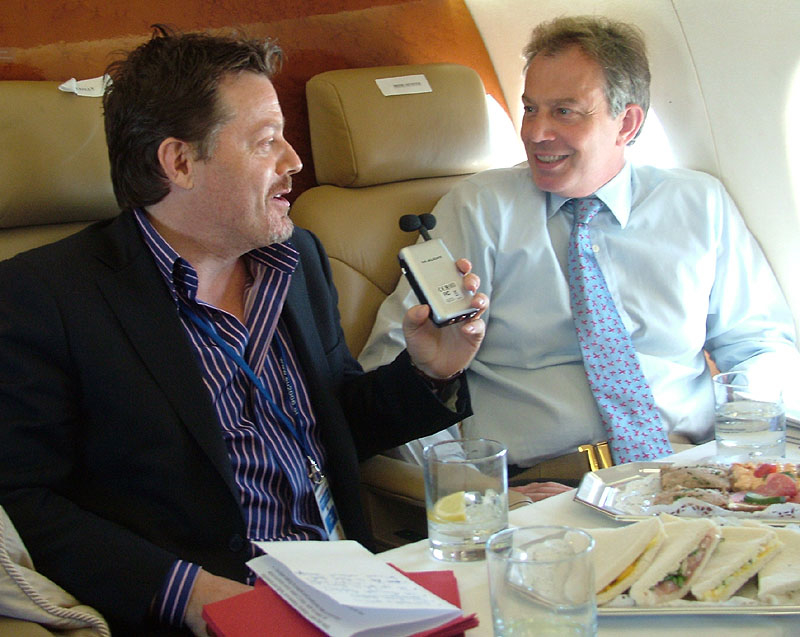
Izzard (left) travels to Brussels with Labour Prime Minister Tony Blair in 2006

Izzard joined the Labour Party in 1995 and in 1998 was listed as one of the largest private donors to the party. In 2008, she donated nearly £10,000 to it. She appeared in party political broadcasts for the Labour Party in the run-up to the 2005 general election and 2009 European election, as well as a 2010 election video entitled Brilliant Britain. During the 2015 general election, she attended a rally with fellow comedian Ben Elton and actor Sally Lindsay. Expressing support for Labour in the 2017 general election, she said that the then-leader of the party Jeremy Corbyn "believes in what he says".

At various times, Izzard said she would run for Mayor of London in 2020. When asked on the comedy panel show The Last Leg why she would be elected, Izzard replied, "Boris Johnson." However, she was not a candidate for the delayed 2021 London mayoral election. Izzard unsuccessfully ran for a seat on the National Executive Committee of the Labour Party in 2016 and 2018. After Christine Shawcroft resigned in March 2018, Izzard replaced her as the next runner-up, but failed to secure re-election that summer.

On 25 August 2022, Izzard stated in an interview on BBC Radio Sheffield that she would like to ask the local Constituency Labour Party to stand in Sheffield Central, replacing the incumbent MP Paul Blomfield, who is standing down at the 2024 election. Local reaction, according to the Sheffield Star newspaper, was mixed. She launched her election campaign on 11 October. On 5 December, it was reported that a local Sheffield City councillor had been selected as the party's candidate for the safe seat, with Izzard coming second in the members' vote.

In August 2023, Izzard announced her campaign to become the Labour candidate for Brighton Pavilion at the next general election, following the decision of the incumbent Green MP Caroline Lucas not to recontest the seat. On 17 December 2023, it was announced that Izzard had not been selected as a Labour candidate at the next general election and that Tom Gray would be contesting Brighton Pavilion on behalf of the Labour Party instead.

== Comedic style ==
Izzard uses a stream-of-consciousness delivery that jumps between topics, saying in a 2004 interview with The Guardian that "it's the oral tradition [...] human beings have been doing it for thousands of years". Her bent towards the surreal went so far as to produce a sitcom called Cows in 1997 for Channel 4, a live-action comedy with actors dressed in cow suits. She has cited Monty Python as her biggest influence, and Python member John Cleese once referred to her as "the lost Python".

== Personal life ==
Izzard has identified as genderfluid. She has stated that she realised by age four that she was a transvestite, but did not come out until the age of 29. According to her 2017 memoir Believe Me, she first cross-dressed in public at the age of 23 with the help of a lesbian friend, an experience which ended in a verbal confrontation with three 13-year-old girls who followed Izzard home from a public toilet. She started to publicly identify as transvestite in venues such as the Edinburgh Festival as early as 1992. She remarked in her 1994 performance Unrepeatable that "women wear what they want and so do I." In 2004, Izzard said "I'm a straight transvestite or male lesbian […] I'd say I'm a complete boy plus half a girl." She stated in 2014 that the way she dressed was neither part of her performance, nor a sexual fetish: "I don't call it drag; I don't even call it cross-dressing. It's just wearing a dress. It's not about artifice. It's about me just expressing myself."

In 2015 she expressed the conviction that being transgender is caused by genetics and that someday this will be scientifically proven; in preparation, she has had her own genome sequenced. In 2016 Izzard described herself as "somewhat boy-ish and somewhat girl-ish" and as a "transgender guy".

When asked in 2019 what pronouns she preferred, Izzard responded, "either 'he' or 'she'" and explained, "If I am in boy mode, then 'he', or girl mode, 'she'". In 2020, she requested she/her pronouns for an appearance on the TV show Portrait Artist of the Year and said she wanted "to be based in girl mode from now on". In March 2023, she announced that she would begin using the name Suzy in addition to Eddie, saying that she was "going to be Suzy Eddie Izzard". Explaining that she had wanted to use the name Suzy since she was 10 years old, she added that people "can choose" which name they want to use to refer to her, and that she would keep using Eddie Izzard as her public name since it is more widely recognised.

Izzard keeps her romantic life private, citing the wishes of her companions in not wanting to become content for her show. She once dated Irish singer Sarah Townsend, whom Izzard first met while running a venue at the Edinburgh Festival Fringe in 1989. Townsend later created the documentary Believe: The Eddie Izzard Story.

Izzard is an atheist. During the 2008 Stripped tour, she said, "I was warming the material up in New York, where one night, literally on stage, I realised I didn't believe in God at all. I just didn't think there was anyone upstairs." She has since described herself as a spiritual atheist, saying, "I don't believe in the guy upstairs, I believe in us."

Izzard supports Crystal Palace and became an associate director at the club on 16 July 2012. She is also a railway modeller.

== Honours ==
In 2003, Izzard received an honorary Doctorate of Letters from the University of East Anglia, Norwich, for her work promoting "modern languages and tolerance of other cultures and lifestyles", and for having "transcended national barriers" with humour. She has also received honorary doctorates from the University of Sunderland in 2012, York St John University in 2018, the University of Sussex in 2025 and the University of Sheffield in 2006, where she had spent a year on an Accounting and Financial Management course in the early 1980s and established the now-defunct Alternative Productions Society in the Union of Students with the aim of promoting fringe-based arts. She was elected Honorary President of Sheffield's Students' Union in 2010.

Izzard's website won the Yahoo People's Choice Award in 2004 and a Webby Award in 2005.

In 2007, Izzard was listed as number 3 of the 100 Greatest British National Comedians (behind Peter Kay at number 2 and Billy Connolly at number 1) as part of British television station Channel 4's ongoing 100 Greatest ... series, and was ranked 5th in 2010.

In 2013, Izzard received the 6th Annual Outstanding Lifetime Achievement Award in Cultural Humanism, which is presented at Harvard University each year by the Humanist Community at Harvard, the American Humanist Association and the Harvard Community of Humanists, Atheists, and Agnostics.

In 2015, Izzard was chosen by readers of The Guardian as their 2014 public language champion. The award was announced at the Guardian and British Academy 2014 Schools Language Awards as part of the annual Language Festival.

== Work ==
=== Videos ===
Date	Title
15 November 1993	Live at the Ambassadors
14 March 1994	Unrepeatable
21 October 1996	Definite Article
17 November 1997	Glorious
9 November 1998	Dress to Kill
18 November 2002	Circle
26 November 2003	Sexie
23 November 2009	Stripped
15 January 2011	Live at Madison Square Garden
18 November 2013	Force Majeure
18 February 2022	Wunderbar

=== Filmography ===
==== Film ====
Year	Title	Role	Notes
1995	The Oncoming Storm	Luthor Keeton	
1996	The Secret Agent	Vladimir	
1998	Velvet Goldmine	Jerry Devine	
1998	The Avengers	Bailey	
1999	Mystery Men	Tony P	
1999	The Criminal	Peter Hume	
2000	Circus	Troy	
2000	Shadow of the Vampire	Gustav von Wangenheim	
2001	The Cat's Meow	Charlie Chaplin	
2001	All the Queen's Men	Tony Parker	
2002	Revengers Tragedy	Lussurioso	
2004	Alien Invasion	Brik	
2004	Blueberry	Prosit	
2004	Five Children and It	It (voice)	
2004	Ocean's Twelve	Roman Nagel	
2005	Romance & Cigarettes	Gene Vincent	
2005	The Aristocrats	Herself	Documentary
2006	The Wild	Nigel (voice)	
2006	My Super Ex-Girlfriend	Professor Bedlam	
2007	Ocean's Thirteen	Roman Nagel	
2007	Across the Universe	Mr. Kite	
2008	The Chronicles of Narnia: Prince Caspian	Reepicheep (voice)	
2008	Igor	Dr. Schadenfreude (voice)	
2008	Valkyrie	Erich Fellgiebel	
2009	Rage	Tiny Diamonds	
2009	Believe: The Eddie Izzard Story	Herself	Documentary
2010	Every Day	Garrett	
2011	Cars 2	Sir Miles Axlerod (voice)	
2011	Lost Christmas	Anthony	Also executive producer
2014	Boychoir	Drake	
2015	Absolutely Anything	Headmaster	
2015	Day Out of Days	Dag	
2016	Whisky Galore!	Captain Wagget	
2016	Rock Dog	Angus Scattergood (voice)	
2017	The Lego Batman Movie	Voldemort (voice)	
2017	Victoria & Abdul	Bertie, Prince of Wales	
2018	The Flip Side	Henry	
2019	Get Duked!	The Duke	
2019	Abominable	Burnish (voice)	
2019	The Song of Names	BBC Radio Announcer (voice)	
2020	The High Note	Dan Deakins	
2020	Six Minutes to Midnight	Thomas Miller	Also co-writer and executive producer
2023	Doctor Jekyll	Dr. Nina Jekyll/Rachel Hyde	
2024	Midas Man	Allan Williams	
2024	Man and Witch: The Dance of a Thousand Steps	Sheep	

==== Television ====
Year	Title	Role	Notes
1991	Barf Bites Back	Herself	Television special
1994	Open Fire	Rich	Television film
1995	Aristophanes: The Gods are Laughing	Socrates	Television film
1996	Tales from the Crypt	Evans	Episode: "Confession"
1998	Rex the Runt	Melting Blob Man / Easter Island Head Aliens (voices)	2 episodes
1998	Monty Python Live at Aspen	Herself	Television special
1999	Python Night – 30 Years of Monty Python	Herself	Television special
2002	Mongrel Nation	Herself	Television documentary
2002	A Day in the Death of Joe Egg	Bri	Television film
2003	40	Ralph Outen	3 episodes
2006	The Secret Policeman's Ball	Herself	Television special
2007	Kitchen	Nick Malone	2-part series
2007–2008	The Riches	Wayne Malloy / Doug Rich	20 episodes
2008	The Secret Policeman's Ball	Herself	Television special
2009	The Day of the Triffids	Torrence	2 episodes
2010	Eddie Izzard: Marathon Man	Herself	Television special
2010	The Simpsons	Nigel Bakerbutcher / Elizabeth II / Prince Charles (voices)	Episode: "To Surveil with Love"
2011	United States of Tara	Dr. Hattarras	8 episodes
2011	The Good Wife	James Thrush	Episode: "The Death Zone"
2012	The Secret Policeman's Ball	Herself	Television special
2012	Treasure Island	Long John Silver	Television miniseries
2012	Bullet in the Face	Johann Tannhäuser	6 episodes
2012	Mockingbird Lane	Grandpa	Television film
2013	Meet the Izzards	Herself	Two episode documentary
2013–2015	Hannibal	Dr. Abel Gideon	6 episodes
2014	Castles in the Sky	Robert Watson-Watt	Television film
2015	Powers	"Big Bad" Wolfe	10 episodes
2015	The Devil You Know	Thomas Putnam	Pilot
2016	The Big Fat Quiz of Everything	Herself	Episode #1.3
2018	Travel Man	Herself	Episode: "48 Hours in Ljubljana"
2019	The Dark Crystal: Age of Resistance	Cadia (voice)	3 episodes
2019	Green Eggs and Ham	Hervnick Z. Snerz (voice)	13 episodes
2021	The Lost Symbol	Peter Solomon	10 episodes
2021	Stay Close	Harry Sutton	Netflix original
2022	The Kids in the Hall	Repairman	Episode 7
2022	Who Wants to Be a Millionaire?	Herself - contestant	1 episode
2023	Culprits	Vincent Hawkes	Recurring role
2024	Kaos	Lachy (Lachesis)	4 episodes
2026	Watson	Sebastian Moran	Episode: "The Cobalt Fissure"

==== Theatre ====
- 900 Oneonta (1994)
- The Cryptogram (1994)
- Edward II (1995)
- Lenny (1999)
- A Day in the Death of Joe Egg (2001–2002, 2003)
- Trumbo (2003)
- Race (2010)
- What About Dick? (2012)
- Charles Dickens' Great Expectations (2022–2023)
- Hamlet (2024)

==== Video games ====
Year	Title	Role	Notes
2000	102 Dalmatians: Puppies to the Rescue	Sgt. Tibbs	
2011	Cars 2	Sir Miles Axlerod	

=== Bibliography ===
- Believe Me: A Memoir of Love, Death and Jazz Chickens (2017), Michael Joseph, ISBN 978-0718181727.

== See also ==
- Cross-dressing in film and television
