= Nakuru District =

Former district of Kenya

Coordinates: 0°30′S 36°0′E

Nakuru District was a district in the Rift Valley Province, Kenya. The district capital was Nakuru. With a population of 1,187,039 (1999 census), following the Nairobi region. Nakuru District had an area of 7,242 km².

Nakuru is an agriculturally oriented area and is home to Lake Nakuru (est. 1961), one of the Rift Valley soda lakes. Lake Nakuru is best known for its thousands, sometimes millions of flamingoes nesting along the shores. The surface of the shallow lake is often hardly recognizable due to the continually shifting mass of pink. The number of flamingoes on the lake varies with water and food conditions and the best vantage point is from Baboon cliff. Also of interest, an area of 188 km around the lake fenced off as a sanctuary to protect Rothschild giraffe and black rhinos.

Other sites of interest around Nakuru include Menengai Crater, an extinct volcano 2,490m (8,167 ft) high. The views of the crater itself, as well as the surrounding countryside, are spectacular.

Hyrax Hill Prehistoric Site, discovered by the Leakeys in 1926, is considered a major Neolithic and Iron Age site. The adjoining museum features finds from various nearby excavations.

The second largest surviving volcanic crater in the world, the Menengai Crater is 2,242 metres above sea level at its highest point. The crater plunges 483 m down from the rim and the summit is accessible by foot or vehicle 8 km from the main road. The mountain is also surrounded by a nature reserve.

Surrounding towns include Lanet, which lies approximately 10 km from Nakuru is predominantly a residential town and is home to an army base. Njoro lies 20 km from Nakuru and is a small agricultural town with a local university aimed at promoting agricultural development in Kenya, namely Egerton university (est. 1934).

== District subdivisions ==
Local authorities (councils)
Authority	Type	Population*	Urban pop.*
Nakuru	Municipality	230,515	219,366
Naivasha	Municipality	115,670	32,222
Molo	Town	89,594	20,944
Nakuru County	County	751,260	80,475
Total	-	1 ,187,039	353,007
* 1999 census. Source:

Administrative divisions
Division	Population*	Urban pop.*	Headquarters
Bahati	143,714	6,018	Dundori
Elburgon	65,314	23,881	Elburgon
Gilgil	91,929	18,805	Gilgil
Kamara	42,281	1,452	Mau Summit
Keringet	59,863	953	Keringet
Kuresoi	40,924	0	
Lare	27,727	0	
Mauche	15,391	0	
Mau Narok	29,916	3,321	Mau Narok
Mbogoini	59,510	228	Subukia
Molo	31,935	17,188	Molo
Naivasha	158,679	36,023	Naivasha
Nakuru Municipal	231,262	212,162	Nakuru
Njoro	79,123	15,635	Njoro
Olenguruone	32,030	509	Olenguruone
Rongai	77,441	2,163	Rongai
Total	1,187,039	338,338	-
* 1999 census. Sources: , ,

The district had six constituencies:

- Naivasha Constituency
- Nakuru Town Constituency
- Kuresoi Constituency
- Molo Constituency
- Rongai Constituency
- Subukia Constituency
