= Nakuru County Council =

Defunct local authority in Kenya

Coordinates: 0°17′11.0″S 36°03′41.0″E

Nakuru County Council is a defunct local authority in Kenya. It was one of the largest county councils in the country. It is home to a population of around 1.6 million, living on some 5,000 square kilometres in the central part of the country. The Nakuru area has a rich history, with human settlements dating back more than 3,000 years. The population is very diverse, with residents that have migratory background from different parts of the country. According to 2002 government statistics, on a population total of 1,312,555, the youth population up to age 25 years was 56%. The percentage of pre-primary and primary school going age residents was 31%, and the County’s total labour force population (age 15-64) was 54%. The population growth rate is 3.4%.

The rural population is estimated to be 65%, with the remaining 35% living in towns and villages of 2,000 inhabitants and over. The County has nine towns with a population of over 2,000 people. There are about 400,000 households, 25% of which are female headed. The number of disabled is 3% and the absolute poverty in the rural areas is 45% and in the urban areas 41%.

== History ==
Nakuru County is the home of pre-historic mankind since a million years. Some 3,500 years ago at five kilometers from what is now Nakuru Town, was a village of about 1,000 people and semi-permanent homes. In the colonial days, the area attracted white settlers who successfully began to exploit its agricultural potential. Nakuru was linked to the Uganda railway and became a centre of trade and industrial activity.

The County Council of Nakuru was established in 1974 as one of the Local authorities of Kenya charged with the responsibility of providing social services to its residents. The administrative set-up follows an organization of local authorities suitable for a developing country like Kenya, with 50 elected Councillors representing 50 wards and 19 nominated Councillors. The Council Chairman is Councillor John Murigu Kamau and the Vice Chairman is Councillor Wilfred Kipyegon R. Kirui (following 2009 elections). The County has in its jurisdiction sizeable towns, including Gilgil where a strategic telecommunication equipment factory is situated, and Subukia in the valley between Nakuru and Nyeri towns. One of the largest volcanic craters in the world is located here: Menengai Crater with a diameter of 12 km.

At the time of Independence in 1963, it was realized that building a County Hall with offices was essential for a more economic and effective control of the new administrative and technical organization. It was estimated that the new County Hall would cost £50,000, inclusive of the Council Chamber. Plans were approved and realized, and the County Hall was officially opened on 23 October 1967 by the First President of Kenya, His Excellency Mzee Jomo Kenyatta. The County Council of the Central Rift comprised two administrative districts, namely Nakuru and Baringo Districts. The Council had under its administration the Area Councils of Naivasha, Nakuru, Molo, Londiani, North Baringo and South Baringo. This vast area covered seven thousand square miles with a population of about four hundred thousand people of different ethnic groups and diverse ways of life. This was under the regional (Majimbo) system of government.

The Council of the Central Rift was disbanded in 1974 and the County Council of Nakuru as we know it today was formed. This comprised only the Naivasha and Nakuru areas. The boundaries were established at Mau Summit, Olenguruone, Kiptunga, Tipis, Lengatua, Ole-Kurto, Maiela, Milili, Suswa, Kijabe (bordering Kiambu), Keriton Hill (bordering Nyandarua), National Youth Service Karunga Hill (Gilgil), Gitare Centre, Kariandusi, Kasambara, Ngorika, Dundori Centre, Equator (next to Laikipia), Mbogoine, Lower Solai, Kisanana, Mogotio (Molo River boundary), Makutano, and Ndoinet.

== Economy ==
Everywhere in Nakuru County is agricultural activity. Agriculture contributes 48% of income. Rural self-employment contributes 8%, wage employment 19%, urban self-employment 23% and other sectors 2%. The number of unemployed in 2002 was 294,195 (15%). Average farm size (small scale) is 2.5-acre (10,000 m^{2}) while average farm size (large scale) is 1,100-acre (4.5 km^{2}). The main food crops produced include maize, beans, Irish potatoes and wheat. The types of fruits and vegetables grown are tomatoes, peas, carrots, onions, French beans, citrus, peaches, apples, cabbages, strawberries, asparagus and leeks. Most of these are grown in Bahati, Njoro, Molo, Rongai, Olenguruone, Nakuru Municipality, Gilgil and Mbogo-ini Divisions. There are three canning factories: Kokoto, Njoro Canners and Kabazi Canners. Tea production is carried out in Olenguruone, Keringet and Bahati Divisions. The parastatal company Kenya Tea Development Agency (KTDA ) only takes tea from Olenguruone and Keringet. The processing of small-holder tea together with that from Nyayo Tea Zone is carried out in Kiptagich Tea Factory Company Ltd. In Bahati Division are three large scale tea dams Beres, Ceres and Kinoru. The rest of tea farming is under small-holders in Kengero, Maombi and Munanda. Other cash crops include flowers, wheat, barley and pyrethrum. Most of all the barley needed for beer production is grown around Molo and Mau Narok. It is processed in Molo Town, where Kenya Malting Ltd has a factory and depots. This company also runs an extension scheme for its farmers under contract. Pyrethrum is a natural insecticide and the County is one of the most important production areas in the world. Most wheats are varieties of Mexican origin, due to climatic similarities between Mexico and Kenya. The total acreage under food crops is 130,000. The total acreage under cash crops 23,000. The main storage facilities include the National Cereals Produce Boards’ stores and silos with a combined capacity of over 220,000 tonnes. Nakuru County has become one of the bread-baskets of the country.

There is much economic activity in other sectors than agriculture. The County boasts 146 industrial plants and over 5,200 informal sector enterprises. Banks and financial institution include eight commercial banks with branches spread out across the County, as well as branches of seven nationwide micro-finance institutions. There are over 150 savings and credit co-operative organizations, popularly known as SACCOs, with a combined membership of 50,000 households.

One of the fastest growing activities is horticulture, especially flower farming. Kenya has proven to be a very competitive exporter of cut flowers. New farms continue to be established, each one of them easily providing direct employment to 250 to 1,000 people. The most common livestock kept in the large-scale commercial farms are dairy and beef cattle, goat and sheep, with milk, meat, hide and skin, wool and mutton as their main products. The diversity and success of agriculture in the County is underscored by the presence of even horse-breeding, at Suswa Farm in Njoro Division. The majority of the large commercial farms are found around Naivasha, Molo, Rongai, Bahati and Njoro Divisions. The dairy industry is also well developed. An increasing number of farmer households is entering the dairy business, knowing that this can bring financial stability. Many small-holders are organized in cooperative societies. Large dairy processing plants are nearby in Nakuru Town and even export-grade cheese is being made by several firms in the area.

Fishing is practiced in Lake Naivasha, a fresh-water lake of 145 km2. There are three landing beaches and over one hundred boats. Fishing is regulated to ensure sustainability. The population of fish farmers with fish ponds is around 100. These ponds are concentrated in Mbogoini, Bahati and Njoro Divisions. The main species of fish catch are Tilapia varieties, Oreochromis, salmoides and procambarus.

The County Council of Nakuru is among the first rural administrative areas in Kenya to embark on an Information and Communication Technology strategy. The County was a champion in the "ICT in Local Government" campaign (2009).

== N/B ==
There is a difference between Nakuru County and Nakuru County Council.

== See also ==
- Local authorities of Kenya
- Nakuru County
