= Genetic history of Eastern Africa =

Eastern African genetic history

The genetic history of Eastern Africa encompasses the genetic history of the people of Eastern Africa. The Sahara served as a trans-regional passageway and place of dwelling for people in Africa during various humid phases and periods throughout the history of Africa.

== Archaic Human DNA ==
While Denisovan and Neanderthal ancestry in non-Africans outside of Africa are more certain, archaic human ancestry in Africans is less certain and is too early to be established with certainty.

== Ancient DNA ==
=== Ethiopia ===
At Mota, in Ethiopia, an individual, estimated to date to the 5th millennium BP, carried haplogroups E1b1 and L3x2a. The individual of Mota is genetically related to groups residing near the region of Mota, and in particular, are considerably genetically related to the Aari people, especially the blacksmith caste of that group.

=== Kenya ===
At Jawuoyo Rockshelter, in Kisumu County, Kenya, a forager of the Later Stone Age carried haplogroups E1b1b1a1b2/E-V22 and L4b2a2c.

At Ol Kalou, in Nyandarua County, Kenya, a pastoralist of the Pastoral Neolithic carried haplogroups E1b1b1b2b2a1/E-M293 and L3d1d.

At Kokurmatakore, in Marsabit County, Kenya, a pastoralist of the Pastoral Iron Age carried haplogroups E1b1b1/E-M35 and L3a2a.

At White Rock Point, in Homa Bay County, Kenya, there were two foragers of the Later Stone Age; one carried haplogroups BT (xCT), likely B, and L2a4, and another probably carried haplogroup L0a2.

At Nyarindi Rockshelter, in Kenya, there were two individuals, dated to the Later Stone Age (3500 BP); one carried haplogroup L4b2a and another carried haplogroup E (E-M96, E-P162).

At Lukenya Hill, in Kenya, there were two individuals, dated to the Pastoral Neolithic (3500 BP); one carried haplogroups E1b1b1b2b (E-M293, E-CTS10880) and L4b2a2b, and another carried haplogroup L0f1.

At Hyrax Hill, in Kenya, an individual, dated to the Pastoral Neolithic (2300 BP), carried haplogroups E1b1b1b2b (E-M293, E-M293) and L5a1b.

At Molo Cave, in Kenya, there were two individuals, dated to the Pastoral Neolithic (1500 BP); while one had haplogroups that went undetermined, another carried haplogroups E1b1b1b2b (E-M293, E-M293) and L3h1a2a1.

At Kakapel, in Kenya, there were three individuals, one dated to the Later Stone Age (3900 BP) and two dated to the Later Iron Age (300 BP, 900 BP); one carried haplogroups CT (CT-M168, CT-M5695) and L3i1, another carried haplogroup L2a1f, and the last carried haplogroup L2a5.

At Panga ya Saidi, in Kenya, an individual, estimated to date between 496 BP and 322 BP, carried haplogroups E1b1b1b2 and L4b2a2.

==== Kilifi ====
At Kilifi, Mtwapa, in Kenya, an individual, dated between 1250 CE and 1650 CE, carried haplogroup L3b1a1a.

At Kilifi, Mtwapa, in Kenya, an individual, dated between 1250 CE and 1650 CE, carried haplogroup L0a1b2a.

At Kilifi, Mtwapa, in Kenya, an individual, dated between 1250 CE and 1650 CE, carried haplogroups J1a2a1a2d2b~ and L3e3a.

At Kilifi, Mtwapa, in Kenya, an individual, dated between 1250 CE and 1650 CE, carried haplogroup L3b1a11.

At Kilifi, Mtwapa, in Kenya, an individual, dated between 1250 CE and 1650 CE, carried haplogroup L3b1a1.

At Kilifi, Mtwapa, in Kenya, an individual, dated between 1250 CE and 1650 CE, carried haplogroups J1a2a1a2d2b~ and L0a2a1a2.

At Kilifi, Mtwapa, in Kenya, an individual, dated between 1250 CE and 1650 CE, carried haplogroups J1a2a1a2d2b~ and L2a1a.

At Kilifi, Mtwapa, in Kenya, an individual, dated between 1250 CE and 1650 CE, carried haplogroups J1a2a1a2 and L3f1b1a1.

At Kilifi, Mtwapa, in Kenya, an individual, dated between 1250 CE and 1650 CE, carried haplogroup L3b1a1a.

At Kilifi, Mtwapa, in Kenya, an individual, dated between 1250 CE and 1650 CE, carried haplogroup L0a2.

At Kilifi, Mtwapa, in Kenya, an individual, dated between 1250 CE and 1650 CE, carried haplogroup L3f1b4a1.

At Kilifi, Mtwapa, in Kenya, an individual, dated between 1250 CE and 1650 CE, carried haplogroup L3e3.

At Kilifi, Mtwapa, in Kenya, an individual, dated between 1250 CE and 1650 CE, carried haplogroup L0a2a2a1.

At Kilifi, Mtwapa, in Kenya, an individual, dated between 1250 CE and 1650 CE, carried haplogroups J and L3b1a1.

At Kilifi, Mtwapa, in Kenya, an individual, dated between 1250 CE and 1650 CE, carried haplogroup L1b1a.

At Kilifi, Mtwapa, in Kenya, an individual, dated between 1250 CE and 1650 CE, carried haplogroup L2a1f1.

At Kilifi, Mtwapa, in Kenya, an individual, dated between 1250 CE and 1650 CE, carried haplogroup L3b1a+@16124.

At Kilifi, Mtwapa, in Kenya, an individual, dated between 1200 CE and 1450 CE, carried haplogroups E1b1b and L0a2a2a.

At Kilifi, Mtwapa, in Kenya, an individual, dated between 1200 CE and 1450 CE, carried haplogroups E1b1b1b2a1a1a1a1f~ and L0a2a2a.

At Kilifi, Mtwapa, in Kenya, an individual, dated between 1200 CE and 1450 CE, carried haplogroups J1a2a1a2d2b~ and L0a2a2a.

At Kilifi, Mtwapa, in Kenya, an individual, dated between 1200 CE and 1450 CE, carried haplogroup M30d1.

At Kilifi, Mtwapa, in Kenya, an individual, dated between 1200 CE and 1450 CE, carried haplogroup L0a2a2a.

At Kilifi, Mtwapa, in Kenya, an individual, dated between 1200 CE and 1450 CE, carried haplogroup L0a1b1a.

At Kilifi, Mtwapa, in Kenya, an individual, dated between 1226 cal CE and 1297 cal CE, carried haplogroups J1a2a1a2d2b~ and M30d1.

At Kilifi, Mtwapa, in Kenya, an individual, dated between 1323 cal CE and 1423 cal CE, carried haplogroups E1b1b and L0d3.

At Kilifi, Mtwapa, in Kenya, an individual, dated between 1350 CE and 1500 CE, carried haplogroup L1c3a1b.

At Kilifi, Mtwapa, in Kenya, an individual, dated between 1400 CE and 1650 CE, carried haplogroups J1a2a1a2 and L3e3a.

At Kilifi, Mtwapa, in Kenya, an individual, dated between 1408 cal CE and 1442 cal CE, carried haplogroup L0a2a1a2.

At Kilifi, Mtwapa, in Kenya, an individual, dated between 1424 cal CE and 1457 cal CE, carried haplogroup L3a2.

At Kilifi, Mtwapa, in Kenya, an individual, dated between 1435 cal CE and 1469 cal CE, carried haplogroups J and L3d1a.

At Kilifi, Mtwapa, in Kenya, an individual, dated between 1435 cal CE and 1479 cal CE, carried haplogroups J1a2a1a2d2b~ and L0a2a2a.

At Kilifi, Mtwapa, in Kenya, an individual, dated between 1442 cal CE and 1612 cal CE, carried haplogroups J1 and L0a1b1a.

At Kilifi, Mtwapa, in Kenya, an individual, dated between 1445 cal CE and 1609 cal CE, carried haplogroups R1a1a1 and L3b1a1a.

At Kilifi, Mtwapa, in Kenya, an individual, dated between 1446 cal CE and 1611 cal CE, carried haplogroups J1a2a1a2d2b~ and L3d1a1a.

At Kilifi, Mtwapa, in Kenya, an individual, dated between 1446 cal CE and 1614 cal CE, carried haplogroups R1a1a1 and L3e1d1.

At Kilifi, Mtwapa, in Kenya, an individual, dated between 1446 cal CE and 1623 cal CE, carried haplogroups J1a2a1a2d2b~ and L1b1a.

At Kilifi, Mtwapa, in Kenya, an individual, dated between 1450 CE and 1700 CE, carried haplogroups J2a1a1a2a2b and L0a2a1a2.

At Kilifi, Mtwapa, in Kenya, an individual, dated between 1451 cal CE and 1619 cal CE, carried haplogroups J1 and L3e3a.

At Kilifi, Mtwapa, in Kenya, an individual, dated between 1454 cal CE and 1623 cal CE, carried haplogroup L3f1b1a1.

At Kilifi, Mtwapa, in Kenya, an individual, dated between 1457 cal CE and 1626 cal CE, carried haplogroup L2a1b1a.

At Kilifi, Mtwapa, in Kenya, an individual, dated between 1496 cal CE and 1630 cal CE, carried haplogroup L1c3a1b.

At Kilifi, Mtwapa, in Kenya, an individual, dated between 1497 cal CE and 1640 cal CE, carried haplogroup L2a1'2'3'4.

At Kilifi, Mtwapa, in Kenya, an individual, dated between 1508 cal CE and 1654 cal CE, carried haplogroup R0+16189.

==== Laikipia County ====
At Kisima Farm/Porcupine Cave, in Laikipia County, Kenya, there were two pastoralists of the Pastoral Neolithic; one carried haplogroups E1b1b1b2b2a1/E-M293 and M1a1, and another carried haplogroup M1a1f.

At Kisima Farm/C4, in Laikipia County, Kenya, a pastoralist of the Pastoral Iron Age, carried haplogroups E2 (xE2b)/E-M75 and L3h1a1.

At Laikipia District Burial, in Laikipia County, Kenya, a pastoralist of the Pastoral Iron Age carried haplogroup L0a1c1.

==== Lamu ====
At Lamu, Manda, in Kenya, an individual, dated between 800 CE and 1500 CE, carried haplogroup L3d1a1a.

At Lamu, Manda, in Kenya, an individual, dated between 1400 CE and 1700 CE, carried haplogroups J2 and L2d1a.

At Lamu, Manda, in Kenya, an individual, dated between 1400 CE and 1700 CE, carried haplogroup L2d1a.

At Lamu, Manda, in Kenya, an individual, dated between 1437 cal CE and 1482 cal CE, carried haplogroup L2a1b1.

At Lamu, Manda, in Kenya, an individual, dated between 1456 cal CE and 1621 cal CE, carried haplogroup L2d1a.

At Lamu, Manda, in Kenya, an individual, dated between 1456 cal CE and 1621 cal CE, carried haplogroup J2.

At Lamu, Manda, in Kenya, an individual, dated between 1457 cal CE and 1626 cal CE, carried haplogroups J2b2a2~ and L2d1a.

At Lamu, Manda, in Kenya, an individual, dated between 1485 cal CE and 1629 cal CE, carried haplogroups G2a and L3e3a.

At Lamu, Pate Island, Faza, in Kenya, an individual, dated between 1500 CE and 1700 CE, carried haplogroups E1b1a1a1a2a1a and L3e3a.

==== Nakuru County ====
At Prettejohn's Gully, in Nakuru County, Kenya, there were two pastoralists of the early pastoral period; one carried haplogroups E2 (xE2b)/E-M75 and K1a, and another carried haplogroup L3f1b.

At Cole's Burial, in Nakuru County, Kenya, a pastoralist of the Pastoral Neolithic carried haplogroups E1b1b1a1a1b1/E-CTS3282 and L3i2.

At Rigo Cave, in Nakuru County, Kenya, there were three pastoralists of the Pastoral Neolithic/Elmenteitan, one carried haplogroups E1b1b1b2b2a1/E-M293 and L3f, another carried haplogroups E1b1b1b2b2/E-V1486, likely E-M293, and probably M1a1b, and the last carried haplogroups E1b1b1b2b2a1/E-M293 and L4b2a2c.

At Naishi Rockshelter, in Nakuru County, Kenya, there two pastoralists of the Pastoral Neolithic; one carried haplogroups E1b1b1b2b/E-V1515, likely E-M293, and L3x1a, and another carried haplogroups A1b (xA1b1b2a)/A-P108 and L0a2d.

At Keringet Cave, in Nakuru County, Kenya, a pastoralist of the Pastoral Neolithic carried haplogroups A1b1b2/A-L427 and L4b2a1, and another pastoralist of the Pastoral Neolithic/Elmenteitan carried haplogroup K1a.

At Naivasha Burial Site, in Nakuru County, Kenya, there were five pastoralists of the Pastoral Neolithic; one carried haplogroup L4b2a2b, another carried haplogroups xBT, likely A, and M1a1b, another carried haplogroups E1b1b1b2b2a1/E-M293 and L3h1a1, another carried haplogroups A1b1b2b/A-M13 and L4a1, and the last carried haplogroups E1b1b1b2b2a1/E-M293 and L3x1a.

At Njoro River Cave II, in Nakuru County, Kenya, a pastoralist of the Pastoral Neolithic carried haplogroup L3h1a2a1.

At Egerton Cave, in Nakuru County, Kenya, a pastoralist of the Pastoral Neolithic/Elmenteitan carried haplogroup L0a1d.

At Ilkek Mounds, in Nakuru County, Kenya, a pastoralist of the Pastoral Iron Age carried haplogroups E2 (xE2b)/E-M75 and L0f2a.

At Deloraine Farm, in Nakuru County, Kenya, an iron metallurgist of the Iron Age carried haplogroups E1b1a1a1a1a/E-M58 and L5b1.

==== Narok County ====
At Kasiole 2, in Narok County, Kenya, a pastoralist of the Pastoral Iron Age carried haplogroups E1b1b1b2b/E-V1515, likely E-M293, and L3h1a2a1.

At Emurua Ole Polos, in Narok County, Kenya, a pastoralist of the Pastoral Iron Age carried haplogroups E1b1b1b2b2a1/E-M293 and L3h1a2a1.

==== Taita Taveta ====
At Taita Taveta, Makwasinyi, in Kenya, an individual, dated between 1650 CE and 1950 CE, carried haplogroups E1b1a1a1a2a1a and L4b2a.

At Taita Taveta, Makwasinyi, in Kenya, an individual, dated between 1650 CE and 1950 CE, carried haplogroup L3d1a1a.

At Taita Taveta, Makwasinyi, in Kenya, an individual, dated between 1650 CE and 1950 CE, carried haplogroup L3d1a1a.

At Taita Taveta, Makwasinyi, in Kenya, an individual, dated between 1650 CE and 1950 CE, carried haplogroups E1b1a1a1a2a1a3b1d1c and L1c3b1a.

At Taita Taveta, Makwasinyi, in Kenya, an individual, dated between 1650 CE and 1950 CE, carried haplogroup L3f2a1.

At Taita Taveta, Makwasinyi, in Kenya, an individual, dated between 1650 CE and 1950 CE, carried haplogroup L0f2a.

At Taita Taveta, Makwasinyi, in Kenya, an individual, dated between 1650 CE and 1950 CE, carried haplogroup L5a1a.

At Taita Taveta, Makwasinyi, in Kenya, an individual, dated between 1650 CE and 1950 CE, carried haplogroups E1b1a1a1a2a1a and L2a1+143.

At Taita Taveta, Makwasinyi, in Kenya, an individual, dated between 1650 CE and 1950 CE, carried haplogroup L0d3.

At Taita Taveta, Makwasinyi, in Kenya, an individual, dated between 1650 CE and 1950 CE, carried haplogroup L3e3a.

At Taita Taveta, Makwasinyi, in Kenya, an individual, dated between 1667 cal CE and 1843 cal CE, carried haplogroups E1b1a1a1a2a1a3b1d1c and L2a1+143.

At Taita Taveta, Makwasinyi, in Kenya, an individual, dated between 1698 cal CE and 1950 cal CE, carried haplogroup L0a1a+200.

At Taita Taveta, Makwasinyi, in Kenya, an individual, dated between 1709 cal CE and 1927 cal CE, carried haplogroups E1b1a1a1a2a1a3a1d~ and L3a2.

=== Tanzania ===
At Mlambalasi rockshelter, in Tanzania, an individual, dated between 20,345 BP and 17,025 BP, carried undetermined haplogroups.

At Kisese II rockshelter, in Tanzania, an individual, dated between 7240 BP and 6985 BP, carried haplogroups B2b1a~ and L5b2.

At Luxmanda, Tanzania, an individual, estimated to date between 3141 BP and 2890 BP, carried haplogroup L2a1.

At Kuumbi Cave, in Zanzibar, Tanzania, an individual, estimated to date between 1370 BP and 1303 BP, carried haplogroup L4b2a2c.

==== Karatu District ====
At Gishimangeda Cave, in Karatu District, Tanzania, there were eleven pastoralists of the Pastoral Neolithic; one carried haplogroups E1b1b1a1b2/E-V22 and HV1b1, another carried haplogroup L0a, another carried haplogroup L3x1, another carried haplogroup L4b2a2b, another carried haplogroups E1b1b1b2b2a1/E-M293 and L3i2, another carried haplogroup L3h1a2a1, another carried haplogroups E1b1b1b2b2/E-V1486, likely E-M293 and L0f2a1, and another carried haplogroups E1b1b1b2b2/E-V1486, likely E-M293, and T2+150; while most of the haplogroups among three pastoralists went undetermined, one was determined to carry haplogroup BT, likely B.

==== Kilwa Coast ====
At Kilwa, Coast, in Tanzania, an individual, dated between 1300 CE and 1600 CE, carried haplogroups J2a2a1a1a2a~ and L2a1h.

At Kilwa, Coast, in Tanzania, an individual, dated between 1300 CE and 1600 CE, carried haplogroup L3b1a11.

==== Lindi ====
At Lindi, in Tanzania, an individual, dated between 1511 cal CE and 1664 cal CE, carried haplogroups E1b1a1a1a2a1a3a1d~ and L0a1a2.

==== Pemba Island ====
At Makangale Cave, on Pemba Island, Tanzania, an individual, estimated to date between 1421 BP and 1307 BP, carried haplogroup L0a.

At Makangale Cave, on Pemba Island, Tanzania, an individual, estimated to date between 639 BP and 544 BP, carried haplogroup L2a1a2.

==== Songo Mnara ====
At Songo Mnara, in Tanzania, an individual, dated between 1294 cal CE and 1392 cal CE, carried haplogroups R1a and L3e3a.

At Songo Mnara, in Tanzania, an individual, dated between 1402 cal CE and 1437 cal CE, carried haplogroup L3e2b1a2.

At Songo Mnara, in Tanzania, an individual, dated between 1412 cal CE and 1446 cal CE, carried haplogroup L3d1a1a.

At Songo Mnara, in Tanzania, an individual, dated between 1418 cal CE and 1450 cal CE, carried haplogroups E1b1a1~ and L3e2b.

At Songo Mnara, in Tanzania, an individual, dated between 1508 cal CE and 1648 cal CE, carried haplogroup L3d1a1a1.

At Songo Mnara, in Tanzania, an individual, dated between 1516 cal CE and 1667 cal CE, carried haplogroups E1b1b1b2b2a1a~ and L3a1b.

At Songo Mnara, in Tanzania, an individual, dated between 1629 cal CE and 1794 cal CE, carried haplogroups E1b1b1a1a1b2~ and L3d1a1a1.

=== Uganda ===
At Munsa, in Uganda, an individual, dated to the Later Iron Age (500 BP), carried haplogroup L3b1a1.

== Y-Chromosomal DNA ==
As of 19,000 years ago, Africans, bearing haplogroup E1b1a-V38, likely traversed across the Sahara, from east to west.

Before the slave trade period, East Africans, who carried haplogroup E1b1a-M2, expanded into Arabia, resulting in various rates of inheritance throughout Arabia (e.g., 2.8% Qatar, 3.2% Yemen, 5.5% United Arab Emirates, 7.4% Oman).

== Mitochondrial DNA ==
In 150,000 BP, Africans (e.g., Central Africans, East Africans) bearing haplogroup L1 diverged. In 130,000 BP, Africans bearing haplogroup L5 diverged in East Africa. Between 130,000 BP and 75,000 BP, behavioral modernity emerged among Southern Africans and long-term interactions between the regions of Southern Africa and Eastern Africa became established. Between 75,000 BP and 60,000 BP, Africans bearing haplogroup L3 emerged in East Africa and eventually migrated into and became present in modern West Africans, Central Africans, and non-Africans. Amid the Holocene, including the Holocene Climate Optimum in 8000 BP, Africans bearing haplogroup L2 spread within West Africa and Africans bearing haplogroup L3 spread within East Africa. As the largest migration since the Out of Africa migration, migration from Sub-Saharan Africa toward the North Africa occurred, by West Africans, Central Africans, and East Africans, resulting in migrations into Europe and Asia; consequently, Sub-Saharan African mitochondrial DNA was introduced into Europe and Asia. During the early period of the Holocene, 50% of Sub-Saharan African mitochondrial DNA was introduced into North Africa by West Africans and the other 50% was introduced by East Africans. During the modern period, a greater number of West Africans introduced Sub-Saharan African mitochondrial DNA into North Africa than East Africans. Between 15,000 BP and 7000 BP, 86% of Sub-Saharan African mitochondrial DNA was introduced into Southwest Asia by East Africans, largely in the region of Arabia, which constitute 50% of Sub-Saharan African mitochondrial DNA in modern Southwest Asia. In the modern period, 68% of Sub-Saharan African mitochondrial DNA was introduced by East Africans and 22% was introduced by West Africans, which constitutes 50% of Sub-Saharan African mitochondrial DNA in modern Southwest Asia.

== Autosomal DNA ==
From the region of Kenya and Tanzania to South Africa, eastern Bantu-speaking Africans constitute a north to south genetic cline; additionally, from eastern Africa to toward southern Africa, evidence of genetic homogeneity is indicative of a serial founder effect and admixture events having occurred between Bantu-speaking Africans and other African populations by the time the Bantu migration had spanned into South Africa.

Across all areas of Madagascar, the average ancestry for the Malagasy people was found to be 4% West Eurasian, 37% Austronesian, and 59% Bantu.

== Medical DNA ==
The genomes of Africans commonly found to undergo adaptation are regulatory DNA, and many cases of adaptation found among Africans relate to diet, physiology, and evolutionary pressures from pathogens. Throughout Sub-Saharan Africa, genetic adaptation (e.g., rs334 mutation, Duffy blood group, increased rates of G6PD deficiency, sickle cell disease) to malaria has been found among Sub-Saharan Africans, which may have initially developed in 7300 BP. Sub-Saharan Africans have more than 90% of the Duffy-null genotype. In the highlands of northern Ethiopia, genetic adaptation (e.g., rs10803083, an SNP associated with the rate and function of hemoglobin; BHLHE41, a gene associated with circadian rhythm and hypoxia response; EGNL1, a gene strongly associated with oxygen homeostasis in mammals) to hypoxia and low atmospheric pressure has been found among the Amhara people, which may have developed within the past 5000 years. In Tanzania, genetic adaptation (e.g., greater amount of amylase genes than in African populations that consume low-starch foods) has been found in the Hadza people due to a food diet that especially includes consumption of tubers.
