= Kuresoi Community =

Kuresoi Constituency was one of the five constituencies in Nakuru County, in the Rift valley province. Kenya. In 2012, Kuresoi district was split into two constituencies; Kuresoi North and Kuresoi South. A large part of kuresoi is the East Mau forest, part of the largest water catchment in Kenya, Mau forest. Two major rivers, Mara River and Sondu Miriu have their sources in Kuresoi, Molo River which drains into Lake Baringo has one of its tributaries Ribeti starting in Kuresoi.

== The people ==
Kuresoi has a population of 89,594 (1999 census). The community is cosmopolitan. The Kalenjin form the Majority, followed by the Kikuyu, Kisii, Luhya, Maasai and the forest dwelling Ogiek which is also considered a subtribe of the Kalenjin.

=== Farms and crops ===
The farm sizes range from small plots of average 0.8 hectares owned by the majority of small scale farmers to large scale farms owned by people who are or were influential in the past governments. The small scale farmers grow potatoes, maize, garden peas, kales, pyrethrum (diminishing production) and keep animals. The area receives a lot of rain in March–May season and in the July–October long rains. Most of the feeder roads are impassable during these seasons and a lot of crops go to waste.

=== Education ===
The region has about 200 primary schools and 44 public secondary schools. There are no tertiary institutions and the transition rate from primary school to secondary is below the National rate. Incidents of resource conflicts have been experienced recurrently since 1992 with the climax in 2007-8, [Post election violence.] These conflicts have affected the socio-economic development of the people in this district. IDP (internally displaced persons) are a common feature in the district. Conservation efforts in the Mau forest complex have also resulted in more IDP camps after the small illegal encroachers were flushed out.
