= Laikipia Plateau =

Plateau in Kenya

The Laikipia Plateau is a plateau located in central Kenya, bounded by the Great Rift Valley and Mount Kenya. The plateau was formed by Miocene phonolites and creates an escarpment against the Great Rift Valley to the west. The Ewaso Ng'Iro river basin drains through the plateau towards the North. The plateau is important to Kenyan culture due to the existence of key archeological sites, the prevalence of pastoral lifestyles, and the presence of many endangered species.

== Description ==
The Laikipia Plateau is located North of Mount Kenya, east of the Great Rift Valley. The plateau is bordered to the North by the Mathews Range and the Lake Turkana Basin. Much of the current day Laikipia county is located on this plateau. The plateau varies in elevation, sitting between 1700 and 2550 meters above sea level.

== Geology ==
=== Formation ===
The Laikipia Plateau was formed 20-25 million years ago by Miocene "flood" phonolites called the Rumuruti phonolites. The plateau is adjacent to some younger flood basalts such as the Aberdare, Sirima, and Samburu basalts.

=== Drainage ===
The plateau is characterized by large variations in precipitation due to rain shadow effects and topographic diversity. Rainfall patterns generally follow a monsoon pattern, with precipitation across two periods: once in the spring, and once in the fall. The plateau's main river basin is the Ewaso Ng'Iro North Basin. The Ewaso Ng'Iro North Basin starts at Mount Kenya and drains northwards. The plateau has some smaller rivers: the Ewaso Narok, the Nanyuki River, the Ol Keju Losera River, and the Liki River.

Increasing droughts, poor water management, and competing water needs have led to an exacerbation of local conflicts as a result of water shortages.

== Human history ==
=== Archeology sites ===
Laikipia features a few Pastoral Neolithic archeological sites. Pastoralist sites around Kisima Farm were investigated in the 1970s. Other studies have been conducted at the Maasai Plains Site, the Mugie and Lolldaiga ranches, and the Shulumai and Kakwa rockshelters.

=== Modern human activity ===
The Laikipia plateau is home to many pastoralist populations from the Maasai, Samburu, Pokot, and Turkana tribes. Ecotourism is a major industry on the plateau due to its biodiversity, particularly of endangered species of large mammals.

== Ecology ==
=== Flora ===
The central plateau comprises dry savanna, characterized by acacia trees and shrub species such as Vachellia drepanolobium, Vachellia tortilis, Croton dichogamus, and various species of grasses such as Themeda. Wetlands in the plateau host other plant species such as Euclea divinorum, various Cyperus, Casuarina, and Eucalyptus. Pastoralism has had an impact on the vegetation of the plateau by preventing the persistence of large shrubbery. The native flora of the plateau and pastoralism are threatened by the invasive prickly pear Opuntia stricta.

=== Fauna ===
The Laikipia plateau is home to breeding populations of many endangered species and subspecies. Breeding populations of Grévy's zebra persist on the plateau. The plateau is also home to a considerable proportion of Kenya's black rhinos and white rhinos. Other endangered species and subspecies include the African wild dog, the reticulated giraffe, and Jackson's hartebeest.
