= Elburgon =

Town in Kenya

Coordinates: 00°18′00″S 35°49′00″E

Elburgon is a small town in Nakuru County, Kenya. It is located approximately 40 kilometres west of the central business district of Nakuru City, the county capital. It is 34 km from Londiani town, via the C56 road. Nearest towns include Molo, Njoro and Rongai.

Elburgon is an electoral ward of the Molo Constituency and Nakuru County Council. Elburgon is also the name of an administrative division in Nakuru County. Elburgon division is divided into three locations: Elburgon, Mariashoni and Turi.

== Transport ==
It is served by a station on the branch railway line to Kisumu.

== See also ==
- Railway stations in Kenya

== Lumbering ==
Apart from agriculture the lumbering industry serves as a key economic activity in the town. The timber industry serves as a key employer in the town. Lumbering companies such as Timsales ltd and CHEKIMU WOODMART are just a few of the logging and sawmilling factories that harvest timber in the highland region of Nakuru and beyond.
