= Kuresoi South Constituency =

Kuresoi South
- constituency for the Parliament of Kenya
- Kuresoi South Constituency within Nakuru County

- Nakuru County within Kenya
- County: Nakuru
- Population: 155,324
- Area: 591 km^{2} (228.2 sq mi)

Current constituency
- Number of members: 1
- Party: UDA
- Member of Parliament: Joseph Kipkosgei Tonui
- Wards: 4

Kuresoi South is a constituency in Kenya. Part of the former constituency of Kuresoi Community, it is one of eleven constituencies in Nakuru County. The Constituency is further divided into four wards namely; Amalo, Tinet, Kiptagich and Keringet.

== Members of Parliament ==
Elections	MP	Party	Notes
2013	Zakayo Kipkemoi Cheruiyot	URP	
2017	Joseph Kipkosgei Tonui	JP	
