= Kuresoi North Constituency =

Kuresoi North
- constituency for the Parliament of Kenya
- Kuresoi North Constituency within Nakuru County

- Nakuru County within Kenya
- County: Nakuru
- Population: 175,074
- Area: 618 km^{2} (238.6 sq mi)

Current constituency
- Number of members: 1
- Party: UDA
- Member of Parliament: Alfred Kiprono Mutai
- Wards: 4

Kuresoi North is a constituency in Kenya. Part of the former constituency of Kuresoi Community, it is one of eleven constituencies in Nakuru County formed in 2010 after Kuresoi Constituency was split into two.

== Members of Parliament ==
Elections	MP	Party	Notes
2013	Moses Kipkemboi Cheboi	KANU	
2017	Moses Kipkemboi Cheboi	JP	Deputy Speaker of National Assembly
