= Nakuru County =

- County
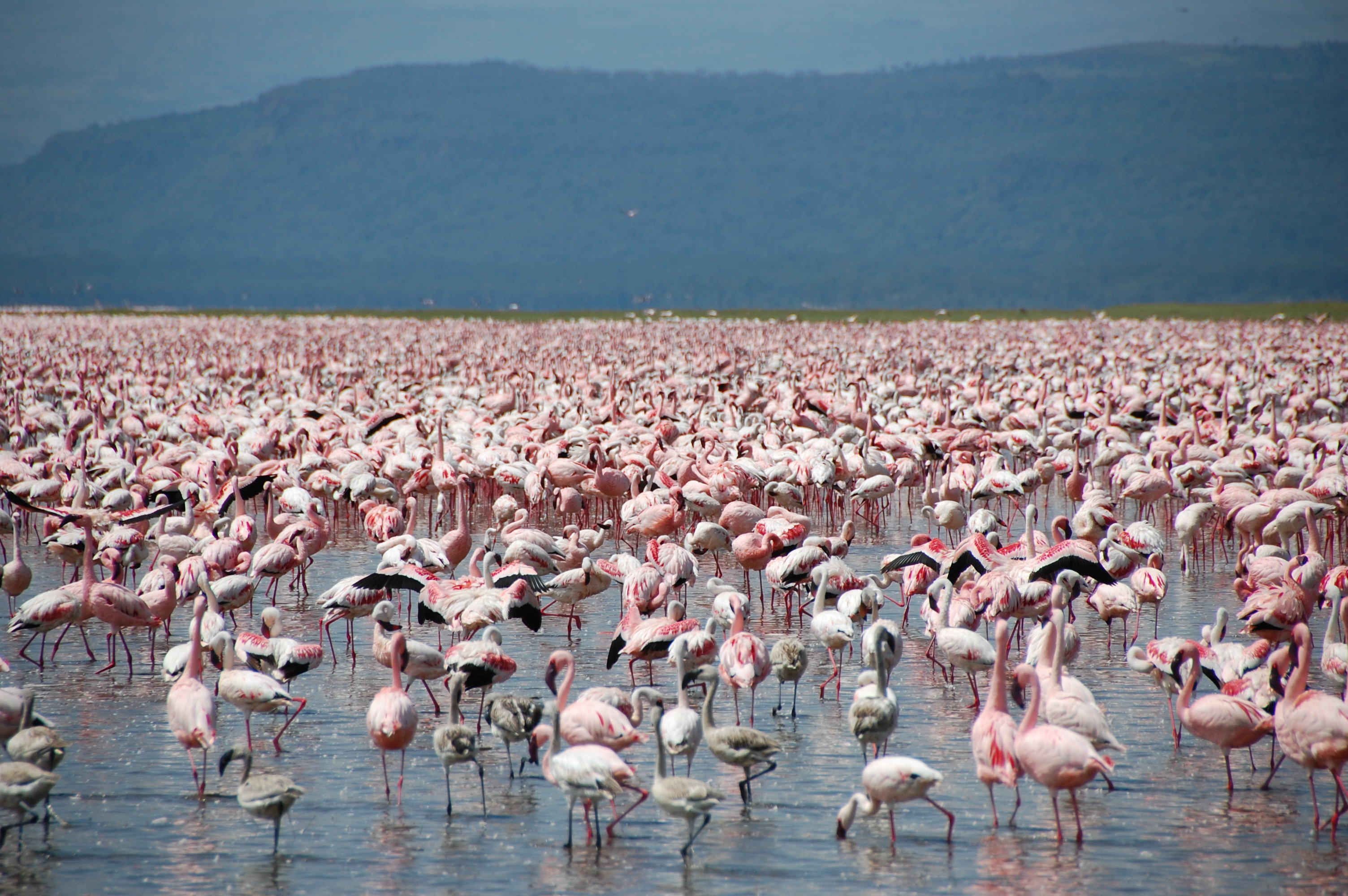
- Flamingos at Lake Nakuru

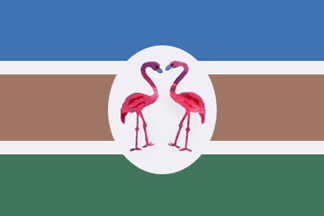
- Flag

- Location of Nakuru County in Kenya
- Coordinates: 0°30′S 36°0′E
- Country: Kenya
- Formed: 4 March 2013
- Capital and largest town: Nakuru
- Other towns: Naivasha

Government
  - Governor: Susan Kihika

Area
  - Total: 7,509.5 km^{2} (2,899.4 sq mi)

Population (2019)
  - Total: 2,162,202
  - Density: 287/km^{2} (740/sq mi)
- Time zone: UTC+3 (EAT)
- GDP (PPP): $13.979B (3rd)
- Per Capita (PPP): $6,080 (7th)
- GDP (nominal): $5.133B (3rd)
- Per Capita (nominal): $2,233 (7th)
- Website: nakuru.go.ke

Nakuru County is one of the 47 counties of Kenya. The county is host to Kenya's fifth urban area that was assigned the status of "city", Nakuru City (which also serves as the county capital) by President Uhuru Kenyatta, ranking it alongside the other Kenyan cities of Nairobi, Mombasa, Kisumu, and Eldoret. With a population of 2,162,202 as per the 2018 census, it is the third most-populous county in Kenya after Nairobi County and Kiambu County respectively. With an area of 7,496.5 km^{2}, it is Kenya's 19th largest county in size.

Nakuru County formed part of the Rift Valley Province until 2013 when Kenyan provinces were disbanded in-favor of devolved counties as per the 2010 Kenyan Constitution. The county is now variously considered to be part of either the Mount Kenya region or the Great Rift Valley region, although neither region is an official administrative nor governmental subdivision of Kenya.

== Population ==
Historical population
Year	Pop.	±%
1979	522,709	—
1989	849,096	+62.4%
1999	1,187,039	+39.8%
2009	1,603,325	+35.1%
2019	2,162,202	+34.9%

=== Religion ===
Religion in Nakuru County

Religion (2019 Census)	Number
Protestant	703,882
Evangelical Churches	647,780
Catholicism	349,526
African instituted Churches	154,007
Orthodox	12,182
Other Christians	140,000
Islam	25,479
Traditionists	4,568
Hindu	1,660
Other	30,379
Not Stated	267
Don't Know	4,937
No religion/Atheists	67,640

== Sites of interest ==
Nakuru County is home to Lake Nakuru, Lake Elmenteita and Lake Naivasha, which are some of the Rift Valley soda lakes. Lake Nakuru is best known for its thousands, sometimes millions of flamingos nesting along the shores. The surface of the shallow lake is often hardly recognizable due to the continually shifting mass of the beautiful pink birds. The number of flamingos on the lake varies with water and food conditions and the best vantage point is from Baboon Cliff. Also of interest, an area of 188 km around the lake fenced off as a sanctuary to protect Rothschild giraffe and black rhinos.

Other sites of interest around Nakuru include Menengai Crater, an extinct volcano 2,490 m (8,167 ft) high, and the Nakuru National Park which is a wildlife zone. The views of the crater itself, as well as the surrounding countryside, are very spectacular.

Hyrax Hill Prehistoric Site, discovered by the Leakey's in 1926, is considered a major Neolithic and Iron Age site. The adjoining museum features are from various nearby excavations.

The second-largest surviving volcanic crater in the world, the Menengai Crater is 2500 meters above sea level at its highest point. The crater plunges 500 m down from the rim and the summit is accessible by foot or vehicle 8 km from the main road. The mountain is also surrounded by the nature's reserve.

The Rift Valley Institute of Science and Technology is a tourist attraction. The institute was established in 1979 by the leaders and people of Rift Valley.

== Urban areas ==
Surrounding towns include Lanet, which lies approximately 10 km from Nakuru. Lanet is predominantly a residential town and is home to an army base. Njoro is another urban town that lies 20 km in the outskirts of Nakuru, and is a small agricultural town with a local university aimed at promoting agricultural development in Kenya, namely Egerton University (est. 1934). Naivasha is another major significant urban Centre in Nakuru County, which sits at the floor of the Great Rift Valley and serves as a major transit of goods. Travelers passing through Naivasha usually make stopovers along the Naivasha – Nakuru Highway to enjoy the beautiful and scenic escarpments of the Great Rift Valley.

== Urban centres ==
Town	Type	Population (2009)	Rank in Kenya (Population Size)
Nakuru	City	307,990	4
Naivasha	Municipality	169,142	9
Gilgil	Municipality	35,293	69
Molo	Town	40,651	60
Njoro	Town	23,551	82
Maai Mahiu	Town	11,230	112
Subukia	Town	7,309	139
Dundori	Town	5,221	166
Salgaa	Town	4,740	174
Mau Narok	Town	4,357	178
Bahati	Town	3,833	184
Rongai	Town	2,215	213
Olenguruone	Town	2,119	214

* 2009 census. Source:

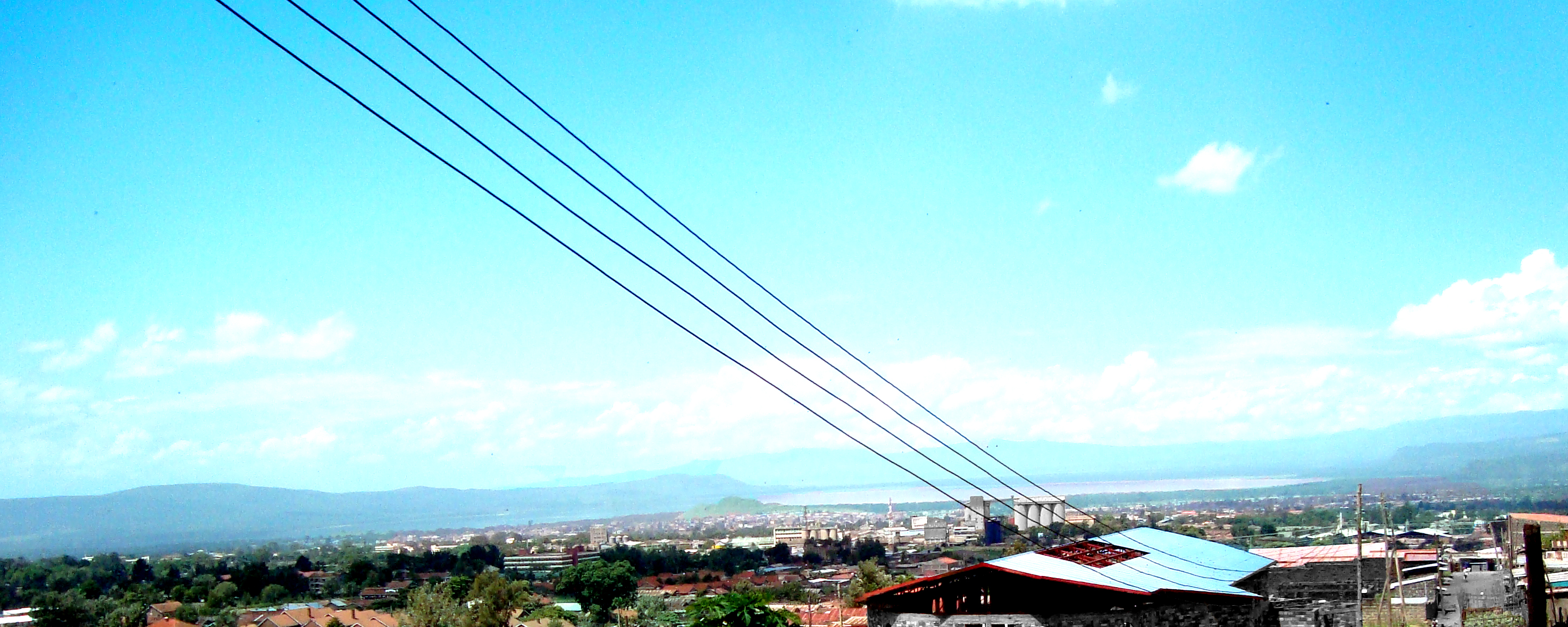
Nakuru Municipality panorama with Lake Nakuru in the background

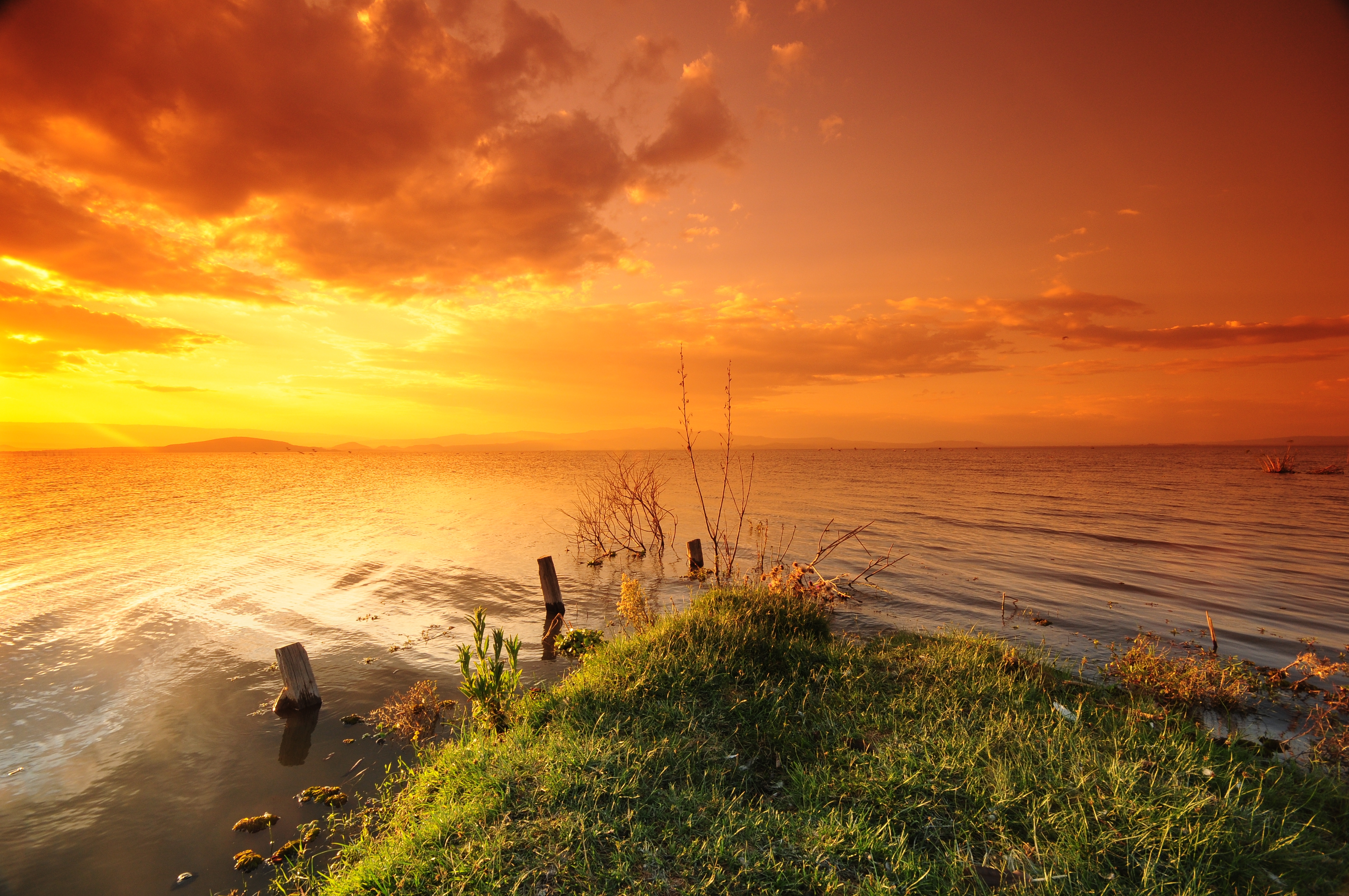
Sunset at Lake Naivasha

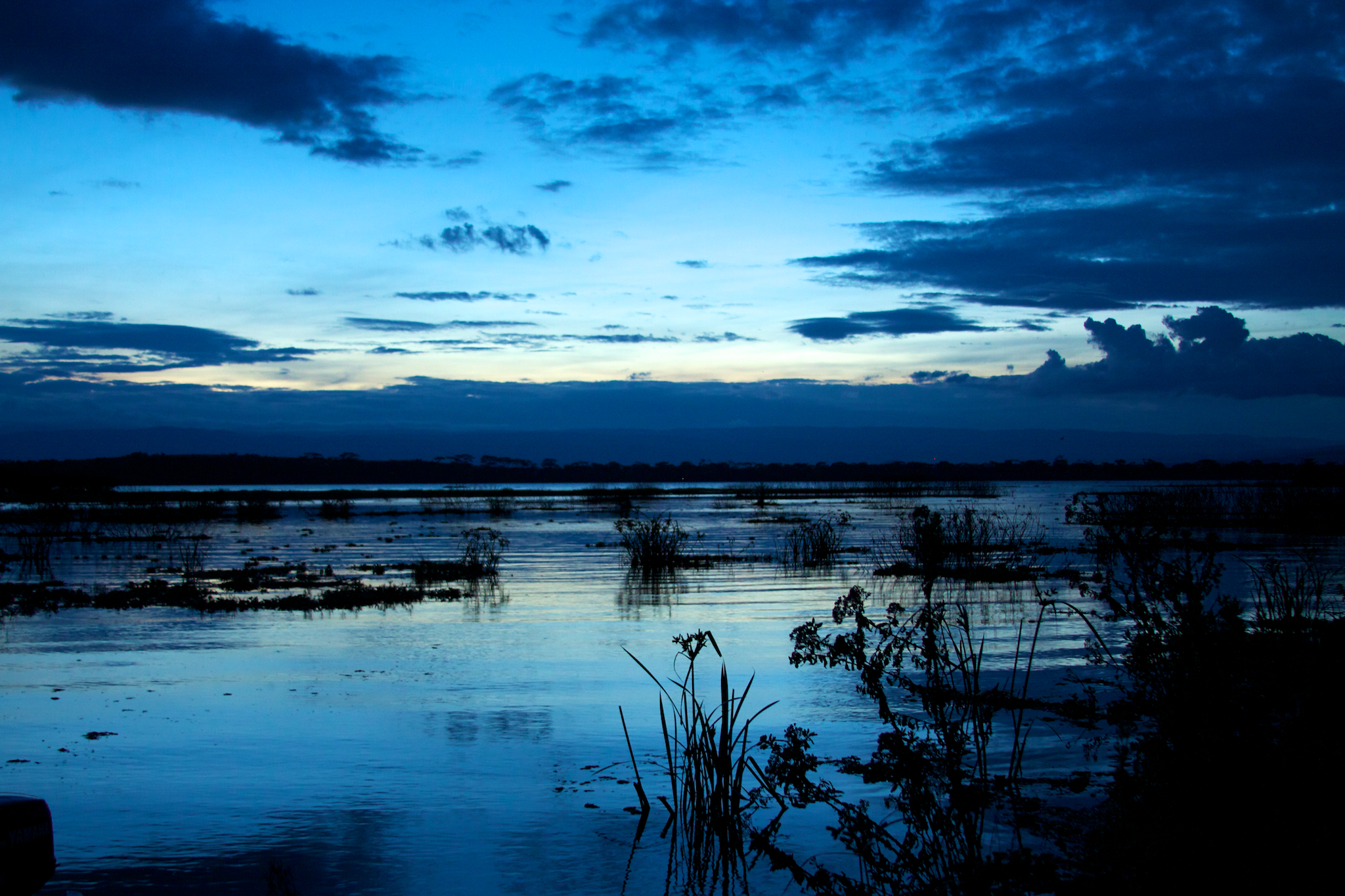
Dusk at Lake Naivasha

Administrative divisions
Division	Population*	Urban pop.*	Headquarters
Bahati	143,714	6,018	Dundori
Elburgon	65,314	23,881	Elburgon
Gilgil	91,929	18,805	Gilgil
Kamara	42,281	1,452	Mau Summit
Keringet	59,863	953	Keringet
Kuresoi	40,924	0	
Lare	27,727	0	
Mauche	15,391	0	
Mau Narok	29,916	3,321	Mau Narok
Mbogoini	59,510	228	Subukia
Molo	31,935	17,188	Molo
Naivasha	158,679	36,023	Naivasha
Nakuru Municipal	231,262	212,162	Nakuru
Njoro	79,123	15,635	Njoro
Olenguruone	32,030	509	Olenguruone
Rongai	77,441	2,163	Rongai
Total	1,187,039	338,338	-
* 1999 census. Sources:

=== Nakuru County Peace Accord ===
The Nakuru County Peace Accord (or "Rift Valley Peace Accord") refers to the peace agreement signed on 19 August 2012 between elders of the Agikuyu (see also Kikuyu) and Kalenjin communities as well as other ethnic groups of Kenya. which was designed to address sources of ethnic conflict and a history of violence in the Rift Valley region of Kenya. It was signed following a 16-month-long peace process led by the National Cohesion and Integration Commission and the National Steering Committee on Peace Building and Conflict Management.

== Politics ==
The county has eleven constituencies which are represented in the Parliament of Kenya:

- Naivasha Constituency represented by Hon. Jayne Wanjiru Njeri – United Democratic Alliance (UDA)
- Nakuru Town West Constituency represented by Hon. Samuel Arama – Jubilee Party
- Nakuru Town East Constituency represented by Hon. David Gikaria – United Democratic Alliance (UDA)
- Kuresoi South Constituency Hon. Joseph Kipkosgei Tonui – United Democratic Alliance (UDA)
- Kuresoi North Constituency Hon. Alfred Kiprono Mutai – United Democratic Alliance (UDA)
- Molo Constituency represented by Hon. Francis Kuria Kimani – United Democratic Alliance (UDA)
- Rongai Constituency represented by Hon. Paul Chebor – United Democratic Alliance (UDA)
- Subukia Constituency represented by Hon. Samuel Kinuthia Gachobe – United Democratic Alliance (UDA)
- Njoro Constituency represented by Hon. Charity Kathambi Chepkwony – United Democratic Alliance (UDA)
- Gilgil Constituency represented by Hon. Martha Wangari Wanjira – United Democratic Alliance (UDA)
- Bahati Constituency represented by Hon. Irene Njoki – Jubilee Party

Nakuru County was seen as the epicenter of violence in the aftermath of the disputed 2007 Presidential Elections which left over 1,100 people dead and over 300,000 displaced nationwide.

== Notable residents ==
- Carole Kariuki, businesswoman and executive

== See also ==
- Narok County
- Kajiado County
- Baringo County
- Laikipia County
- Kericho County
- Bomet County
- Nyandarua County
- Kiambu County
- Nakuru County Council
