= Carole Kariuki =

Kenyan businesswoman (born 1975)

- Born: 1975 (age 50–51); Kenya
- Education: University of Nairobi; (BA in Economics & Sociology); Bowling Green State University; (MA in Public Administration and International Affairs)
- Occupation: Corporate executive (CEO)
- Years active: 2000–present
- Employer: Kenya Private Sector Alliance
- Website: kepsa.or.ke

Carole Kariuki is a business executive in Kenya, who is the chief executive officer of Kenya Private Sector Alliance (KEPSA), an industry group that represents and lobbies on behalf of Kenyan businesses and industries.

== Background and education ==
Kariuki was born in Nakuru County, near Egerton University circa 1975. She was admitted to the University of Nairobi, where she graduated with a Bachelor of Arts (BA) in Economics and Sociology. Later, she received a scholarship to attend Bowling Green State University in Bowling Green, Ohio, in the United States, where she graduated with a Master of Public Administration and International Affairs.

== Career ==
Kariuki us the chief executive officer of Kenya Private Sector Alliance (KEPSA), an industry group that represents and lobbies on behalf of Kenyan businesses and industries. It also advises policymakers on the best way to formulate local and regional laws to promote growth of the Kenyan economy sustainably. KEPSA informs and educates its member companies on best business practices, collective responsibility, environmental conservation, social obligations and ethical business etiquette.

Before joining KEPSA, she worked briefly with Barclays Bank of Kenya, Nairobi Chapel and Sagamore Institute for Public Policy Research, Indianapolis-Indiana, where she acted as a liaison between the Kenya Private Sector Alliance (KEPSA) and the institute before formally joining KEPSA. She worked for several years at KEPSA before being appointed its CEO.

Kariuki is credited for transforming KEPSA into one of the most influential organizations in Kenya and globally. KEPSA is the apex body of the private sector in Kenya, influencing the economic and development agenda.

== Other considerations ==
Kariuki was the first person to be elected as senior fellow at ISOKO, an Indianapolis-based institute that promotes private enterprise in Africa. She won the "Women Super Achiever Award" at the World Women Leadership Congress and Awards 2017, based in India. She was awarded the Elder of the Order of the Burning Spear (EBS) in 2021, for national development contribution to the country, Kenya by H.E. Uhuru Muigai Kenyatta, president of the Republic of Kenya. She was also awarded the Moran of the order of the Burning Spear (MBS) in 2012, for national development contribution to the country. In 2011 and 2012 she was named among the "Top 40 women in business under 40 years", a list compiled by the business daily newspaper Business Daily Africa, published in Nairobi by the Nation Media Group.

In March 2019, she was named to the board of directors at East African Cables Limited, an electricity and industrial cable manufacturer based in Nairobi, board chair of LPC Global Logistics, Kenya, board member of Jubilee Health Insurance Limited, USIU-Africa Trustees, UN Global Compact Network Kenya, council member at the National Council of Administrative Justice (NCAJ) chaired by the chief justice of Kenya, and WTO Trade Committee, Geneva.
