= Rongai =

Town in Nakuru County, Kenya

Coordinates: 00°10′00″S 35°51′00″E

Rongai is a town in Nakuru County, Kenya. It lies 30 km west of Nakuru, along the A104 Road and the railway line between Nakuru and Uganda. It is about 10 kilometres north of Elburgon and 15 kilometres east of Molo. The town lies 1912 m (6272 ft) above sea level and has a population of 20878. Rongai is part of the Rongai Constituency.

== Transport ==
It is served by a station on the national railway system.

== See also ==
- Railway stations in Kenya
