= Zakayo Cheruiyot =

Kenyan politician

Zakayo Cheruiyot (born 1954) is a Kenyan politician.

== Career ==
Cheruiyot championed the formation of the United Republican Party (URP), which has since been dissolved and merged to form the Jubilee Party. He decamped to Chama Cha Mashinani together with former Bomet Governor H.E. Isaac Ruto. He once belonged to the Orange Democratic Movement and was elected to represent the Kuresoi Constituency in the National Assembly of Kenya since the 2007 Kenyan parliamentary election.

Media investigations have reported information indicating that Cheruiyot was involved in shielding Rwandan genocide suspect Félicien Kabuga from arrest and capture in the decade following the 1994 Rwandan genocide.
