= Kuresoi Constituency =

Kenyan electoral constituency

Kuresoi Constituency is a former electoral constituency in Kenya. The constituency was established for the 1997 elections. In 2010, it was split into Kuresoi North Constituency and Kuresoi South Constituency

The Kuresoi constituencies are an agriculturally productive area with large scale plantation of tea in the south western parts of the constituency, pyrethrum and potatoes in the central and northern parts of the constituencies. More than 10,000 hectares of land are under tea growing in the south western parts.

The constituencies have a tea industry, Kiptagich Tea Factory, which processes and packs tea grown in the plantations and also those sold to the factory by the local small scale farmers. The industry is owned by the former president, Daniel T. Moi and it provides employment directly and indirectly to more than 2,500 individuals.

The constituencies are home to different ethnic groups like the Kalenjins, Kikuyus and Kisii community.

== History ==
Kuresoi Constituency experienced tribal skirmishes after the 1992, 1997, and 2007 general elections.

== Members of Parliament ==
| Election | MP | Party | Notes |
|---|---|---|---|
| 1997 | James Cheruiyot arap Koske | KANU | |
| 2002 | Moses Kipkemboi Cheboi | KANU | |
| 2007 | Zakayo Cheruiyot | ODM | |
| 2007 | Zakayo Cheruiyot | URP | |

== Locations and wards ==
Locations
| Location | Population* |
|---|---|
| Amalo | 7,899 |
| Chebara | 4,037 |
| Chemaner | 7,314 |
| Cheptuech | 4,331 |
| Emitik | 4,581 |
| Kamara | 8,535 |
| Kaplamai | 8,946 |
| Kapsibeiywo | 4,977 |
| Kaptagich | 10,773 |
| Keringet | 10,614 |
| Kipsonoi | 4,069 |
| Kiptororo | 14,561 |
| Kuresoi | 16,241 |
| Mau Summit | 21,170 |
| Mkulima | 9,598 |
| Nyota | 16,314 |
| Silibwet | 3,417 |
| Sinindet | 4,107 |
| Sirikwa | 12,576 |
| Temoyetta | 12,652 |
| Tinet | 9,598 |
| Tulwet | 11,521 |
| Total | x |
1999 census.

Wards
| Ward | Registered Voters | Local Authority |
|---|---|---|
| Amalo | 2,652 | Nakuru County |
| Chemaner | 2,375 | Nakuru County |
| Cheptuech | 3,543 | Nakuru County |
| Kamara | 2,537 | Nakuru County |
| Kaplamai | 3,167 | Nakuru County |
| Kapsibeiywo | 4,639 | Nakuru County |
| Keringet | 4,978 | Nakuru County |
| Kiptangich | 5,022 | Nakuru County |
| Kiptororo | 4,756 | Nakuru County |
| Koige | 7,536 | Molo town |
| Kuresoi | 5,398 | Nakuru County |
| Mkulima | 5,974 | Nakuru County |
| Nyota | 5,500 | Nakuru County |
| Sirikwa | 4,032 | Molo town |
| Temoyetta | 3,836 | Nakuru County |
| Tinet | 5,350 | Nakuru County |
| Total | 71,295 | |
*September 2005.
