= Njoro =

Town in Kenya

Coordinates: 0.331626°S 35.944938°E

Njoro is an agricultural town 18 km (11 mi) west south west of Nakuru, Kenya situated on the western rim of the Rift Valley. Njoro town was the headquarters of the former Njoro District, hived off Nakuru District. It was declared as one of the constituencies of Nakuru County in 2010. It has a population of 238,773 people according to the 2019 census report that was published by the Kenya National Bureau of Statistics (KNBS).

== Geography ==
Njoro sits 2,423 m (7,949 ft) above sea level. It is a station on the meter gauge railway line between Nakuru and Kisumu.

== Brief history ==
The town was first settled by the pastoralist Kalenjin and Maasai peoples, before the arrival of British settlers to the Kenya Highlands. Over the years the town grew to be an important center in agricultural research, education and development. The town is home to a campus of the Kenya Agricultural Research Institute (KARI) and Egerton University is situated 5 km (3.1 mi) south from the town center. Njoro was temporarily a district on its own in Rift Valley province. The population is rising due to the fact that peace is prevailing, unlike the neighbouring towns like Molo, Mau Narok, and Likia. It is near the Mau Forest, which has become a global issue on the environment.

== Economy ==
The main economic activities are agribased industries including vegetable and milk processing, large-scale wheat and barley farming, and green house flower farming. Light manufacturing industries such as timber milling, canning, and quarrying are also a mainstay of the local economy. The economic growth of the town has been slowed due to its proximity to the provincial capital, Nakuru. Tourism has a minor but important role in the local economy. The town is part of the south Rift tourist circuit as it is on the way to the famed Masai Mara National Reserve. Tourists can visit the Lord Egerton Castle, which is run and maintained as a visitor and conference center by Egerton University which Lord Egerton founded as Egerton Agricultural College in the mid-1930s they can also visit kembu cottages. The town also boasts of a top golf course from Njoro Country Club and a pharmaceutical facility.

The Kenya Agricultural and Livestock Research Organization (KALRO) Food Crops Research Centre is located in Njoro town. The institution carries out research in wheat rust diseases, oil crops, agronomy and pest and disease management.

== People ==
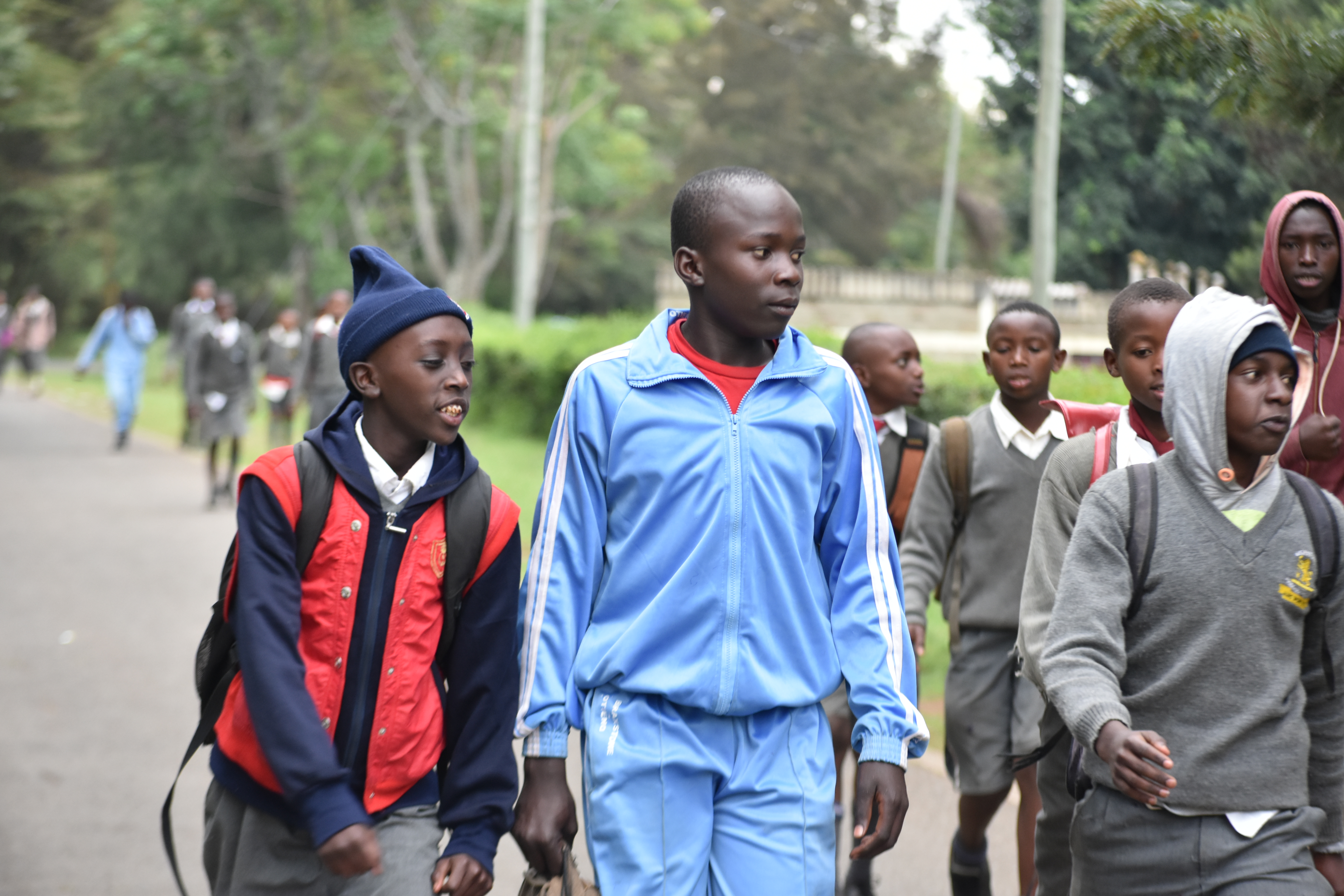
Pupils from Egerton Primary School walking home

Njoro is populated by people from all ethnic groups in Kenya and was a peaceful area during the Mau Mau troubles of the 1950s. However, the Kikuyu are now the predominant people, and thus have greatly influenced the culture of the area. Residents of Njoro lived peacefully until the politically instigated tribal clashes of the 1990s. Several people were killed and many displaced due to the laxity of the Moi regime to maintain law and order. Issues arising from the displacement of local residents and their desired resettlement have continued to cause friction. It is the fastest growing town in Nakuru county with a lot of investment within it. The area is well equipped with agriculture having the effect from KARI and Egerton University.

== See also ==
- Railway stations in Kenya
- Beryl Markham
