= Haplogroup L0 =

Human mitochondrial DNA grouping indicating common ancestry

- Possible time of origin: 130 to 200 ka
- Possible place of origin: Southern Africa or Southern East Africa
- Ancestor: L (Mitochondrial Eve)
- Descendants: L0a'b'f'k, L0d
- Defining mutations: 263!, 1048, 3516A, 5442, 6185, 9042, 9347, 10589, 12007, 12720

Haplogroup L0 is a human mitochondrial DNA (mtDNA) haplogroup.

== Origin ==
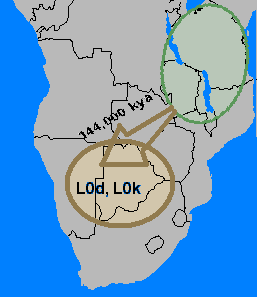
The region in Africa where Tishkoff found the greatest level of mitochondrial diversity (green) and the region Behar et al. postulated the most ancient division in the human population began to occur (light brown)

L0 is one of two branches from the most recent common ancestor (MRCA) for the shared human maternal lineage. The haplogroup consists of five main branches (L0a, L0b, L0d, L0f, L0k). Four of them were originally classified into L1 subclades, L1a, L1d, L1f and L1k.

In 2014, ancient DNA analysis of a 2,330 year old male forager's skeleton in Southern Africa found that the specimen belonged to the L0d2c1c mtDNA subclade. This maternal haplogroup is today most closely associated with the Ju, a subgroup of the indigenous San people, which points to population continuity in the region. In 2016, a Late Iron Age desiccated mummy from the Tuli region in northern Botswana was also found to belong to haplogroup L0.

- MRCA (mtDNA)
  - L0
    - - - - L0a
          - L0b
        - L0f
      - L0k
    - L0d
  - L1-6
    - L1
    - L2-6

== Distribution ==
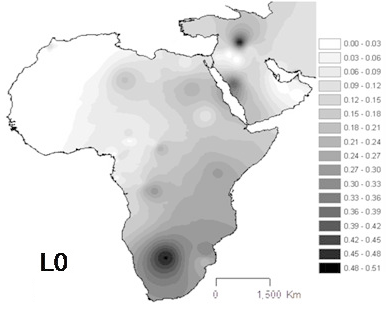
Projected spatial distribution of haplogroup L0 in Africa.

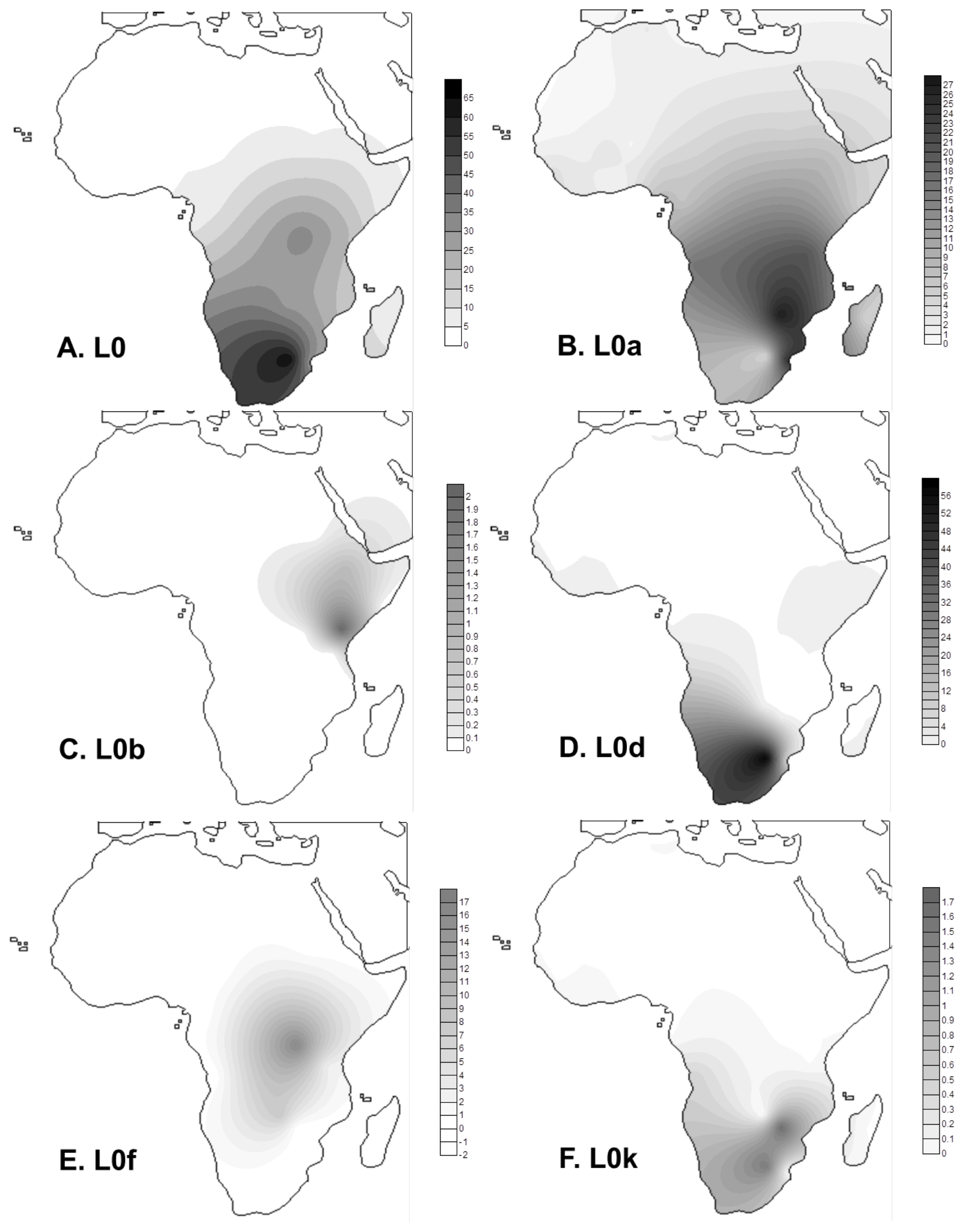
Frequency maps for L0 (total), L0a, L0b, L0d, L0f and L0k

L0 is found most commonly in Sub-Saharan Africa. It reaches its highest frequency in the Khoisan people at 73% on average. Some of the highest frequencies are: Namibia (!Xun) 79%, South Africa (Khwe/!Xun) 83%, and Botswana (!Kung) 100%.

Haplogroup L0d is found among Khoisan groups of Southern Africa closer to the Khoid side with (following L0k) being more Sanid but is largely restricted to the Khoisan as a whole. L0d is also commonly found in sections of the Coloured population of South Africa and frequencies range from 60% to 71%. This illustrates the massive maternal contribution of Khoisan people to sections of the Coloured population of South Africa.

Y-DNA haplogroup analysis shows that the paternal ancestry of the South African Coloured population is predominantly composed of lineages derived from Bantu-speaking African and European males.

Haplogroups L0k is the second most common haplogroup in the Khoisan groups closer to the Sanid side with (following L0d) being more Khoid but is largely restricted to the Khoisan as a whole. Although the Khoisan associated L0d haplogroup were found in high frequencies in sections of the Coloured population of South Africa, L0k were not observed in two studies involving large groups of Coloured individuals.

Haplogroup L0f is present in relatively small frequencies in Tanzania, East Africa among the Sandawe people of Tanzania.

Haplogroup L0a is most prevalent in South-East African populations (25% in Mozambique). Among Guineans, it has a frequency between 1% and 5%, with the Balanta group showing increased frequency of about 11%. Haplogroup L0a has a Paleolithic time depth of about 33,000 years and likely reached Guinea between 10,000 and 4,000 years ago. It also is often seen in the Mbuti and Biaka Pygmies. L0a is found at a frequency of almost 25% in Hadramawt (Yemen).

Haplogroup L0b is found in Ethiopia.

== Drug and disease interactions ==
In patients who are given the drug stavudine to treat HIV, Haplogroup L0a2 is associated with a higher likelihood of peripheral neuropathy as a side effect.

== Subclades ==
=== Tree ===
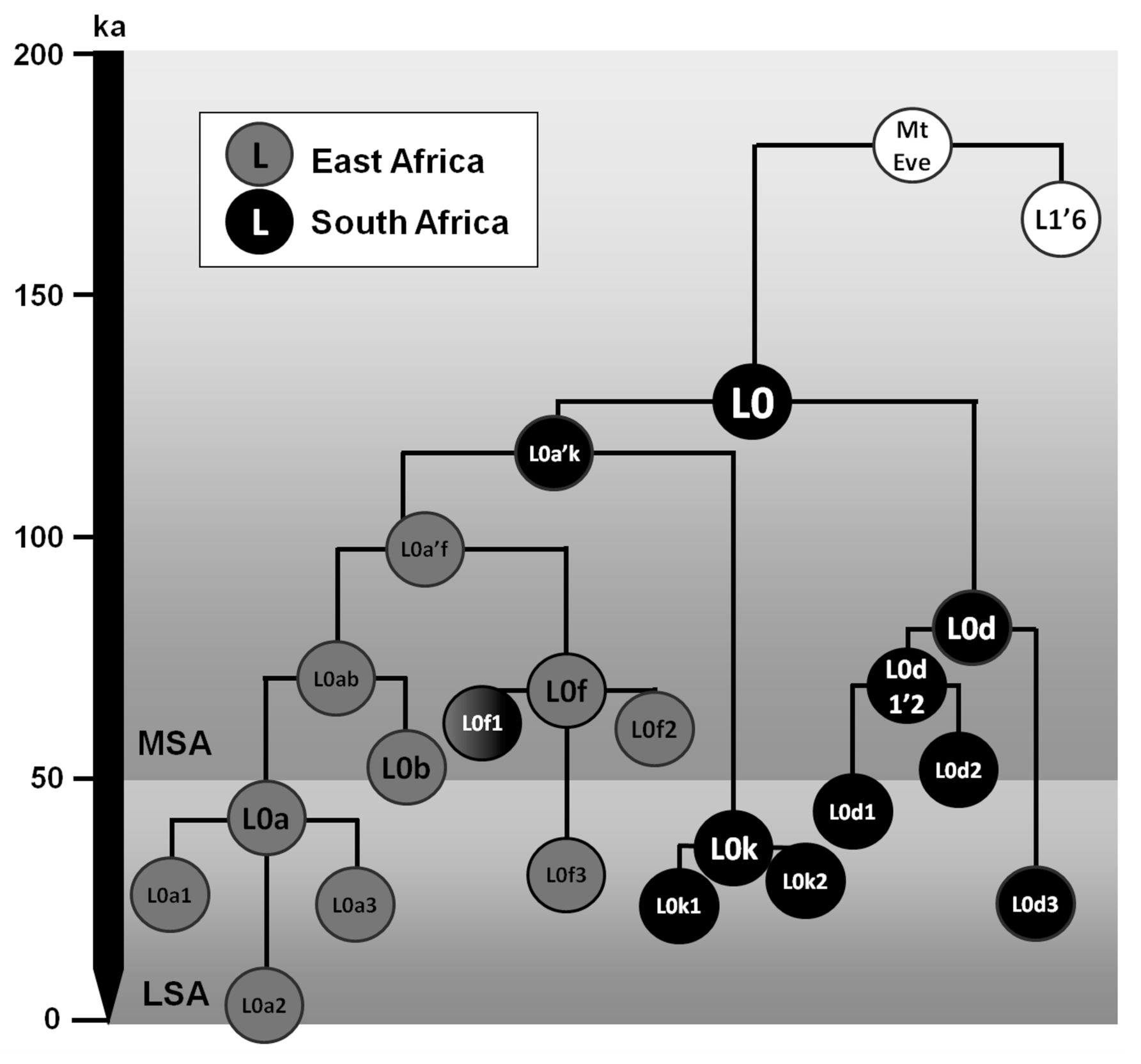
Schematic tree of haplogroup L0. MSA: Middle Stone Age, LSA: Later Stone Age, ka: thousand years ago.

This phylogenetic tree of haplogroup L0 subclades is based on the paper by Mannis van Oven and Manfred Kayser Updated comprehensive phylogenetic tree of global human mitochondrial DNA variation and subsequent published research.

- Most Recent Common Ancestor (MRCA)
  - L0
    - L0d
      - L0d3
      - L0d1'2
        - L0d1
          - L0d1a
          - L0d1b
          - L0d1c
            - L0d1c1
        - L0d2
          - L0d2a'b
            - L0d2a
              - L0d2a1
            - L0d2b
          - L0d2c
            - L0d2c1c
    - L0a'b'f'k
      - L0k
        - L0k1
        - L0k2
      - L0a'b'f
        - L0f
          - L0f1
          - L0f2
            - L0f2a
            - L0f2b
        - L0a'b
          - L0a
            - L0a1
              - L0a1a
                - L0a1a2
              - L0a1b
                - L0a1b1
                  - L0a1b1a
                - L0a1b2
              - L0a1c
              - L0a1d
            - L0a2
              - L0a2a
                - L0a2a1
                  - L0a2a1a
                    - L0a2a1a1
                    - L0a2a1a2
                - L0a2a2
                  - L0a2a2a
              - L0a2b
                - L0a2ba
              - L0a2c
              - L0a2d
            - L0a3
            - L0a4
          - L0b

== See also ==
- Genealogical DNA test
- Genetic genealogy
- Human mitochondrial genetics
- Population genetics
- Human mitochondrial DNA haplogroup

Phylogenetic tree of human mitochondrial DNA (mtDNA) haplogroups

Mitochondrial Eve (L)

L0
L1–6

L1
L2

L3

L4
L5
L6
M
N

CZ
D
E
G
Q

O
A
S
R

I
W
X
Y
C
Z
B
F
R0

pre-JT

P

U
HV
JT
K
H
V
J
T
