= Dundori =

- Location within Kenya
- Coordinates: 0.2°S 36.27°E
- Country: Kenya
- County: Nyandarua
- Time zone: UTC+3 (EAT)

Dundori or Ndundori is a settlement in Kenya's Nyandarua County.

== History ==
The province is inhabited by the Kikuyu speaking who are part of the Kenya Eastern Bantu. During Kenya's colonization by the British, much of the province was regarded as part of the 'White Highlands', for the exclusive use of the settler community. Therefore, it saw political activity from the local communities who felt that they had an ancestral right to the land. This tension culminated in the 1950s with the Mau Mau rebellion; it saw the region placed under a state of emergency and the arrest of many prominent political leaders. Though Dundori cover a vast area, there is a controversial on naming of rural centres within the region, However, There is Dundori Gwakiongo which has been administratively renamed as Mirangine which is in Nyandarua county or in the former central province. Then there is Dundori centre which is in Nakuru county or otherwise in the former Rift Valley province. Dundori area spreads from Lanet to Nyandarua.

The Dundori Forest in Nakuru has a 60-foot waterfall that is a popular tourist attraction in the area.
