= Haplogroup L3 =

Widespread human mitochondrial DNA grouping indicating common ancestry

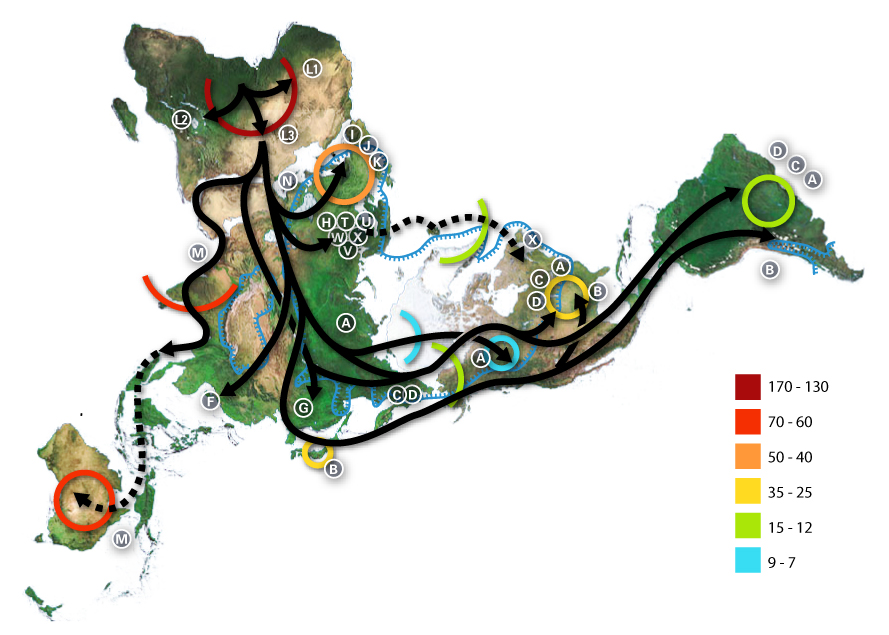
- Ancient dispersal of haplogroup L3, its descendant M and N lineages, and other mtDNA clades. Numbers represent thousand years before present.
- Possible time of origin: 80,000–60,000 BP, 70,000 BP
- Possible place of origin: East Africa or Asia
- Ancestor: L3'4
- Descendants: L3a, L3b'f, L3c'd, L3e'i'k'x, L3h, M, N
- Defining mutations: 769, 1018, 16311

Haplogroup L3 is a human mitochondrial DNA (mtDNA) haplogroup. The clade has played a pivotal role in the early dispersal of anatomically modern humans.

It is strongly associated with the out-of-Africa migration of modern humans of about 70–50,000 years ago. It is inherited by all modern non-African populations, as well as by some populations in Africa.

== Origin ==
Haplogroup L3 arose close to 70,000 years ago, near the time of the recent out-of-Africa event. This dispersal originated in East Africa and expanded to West Asia, and further to South and Southeast Asia in the course of a few millennia, and some research suggests that L3 participated in this migration out of Africa. A 2007 estimate for the age of L3 suggested a range of 104–84,000 years ago. More recent analyses, including Soares et al. (2012), arrive at a more recent date, of roughly 70–60,000 years ago. Soares et al. also suggest that L3 most likely expanded from East Africa into Eurasia sometime around 65–55,000 years ago as part of the recent out-of-Africa event, as well as from East Africa into Central Africa from 60 to 35,000 years ago. In 2016, Soares et al. again suggested that haplogroup L3 emerged in East Africa, leading to the out-of-Africa migration, around 70–60,000 years ago.

Haplogroups L6 and L4 form sister clades of L3 which arose in East Africa at roughly the same time but which did not participate in the out-of-Africa migration. The ancestral clade L3'4'6 has been estimated at 110 kya, and the L3'4 clade at 95 kya.

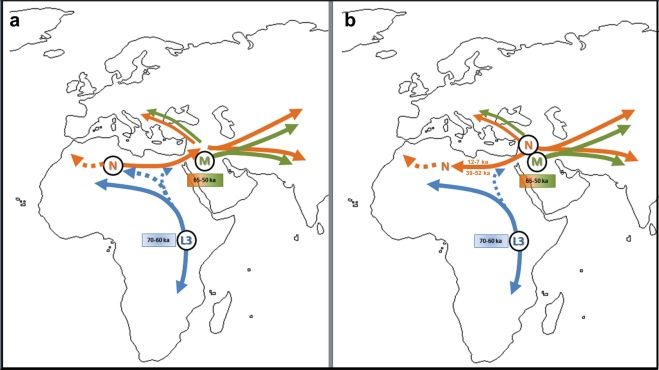
Proposed migration route depicting the origin of L3 in Africa and its dispersal both out of and within the continent, with two possible models (as depicted by Vai et al.) (a) Haplogroup N differentiates from L3 in Africa, with a subsequent spread out of Africa, and differentiation of haplogroup M from L3 outside Africa. (b) Haplogroups M and N diverge from L3 outside Africa after the expansion of L3 from the continent; later migrations during the Upper Paleolithic and Neolithic led some lineages back to North Africa. (Haplogroups are indicated in black circles in their probable area of origin.)

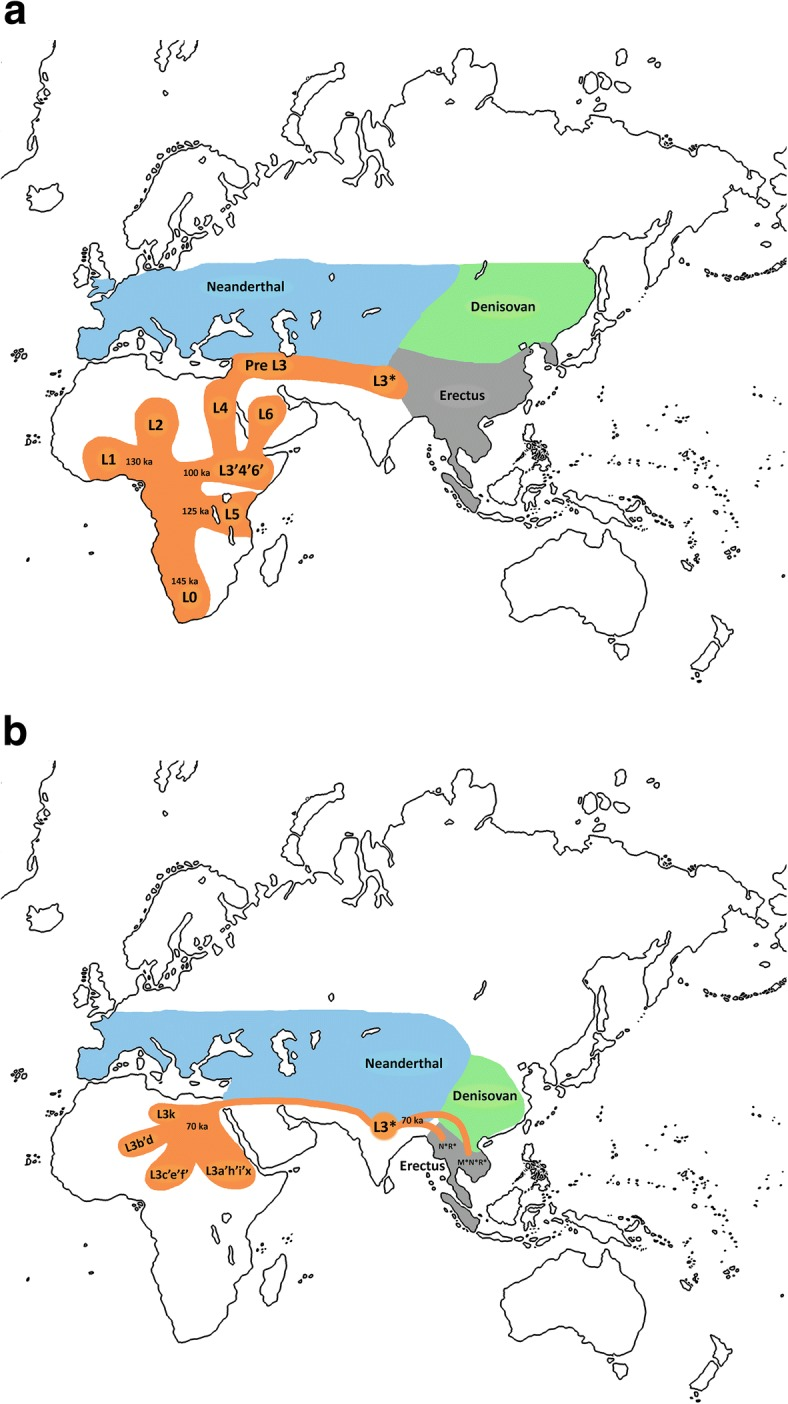
Proposed migration route according to the Asian origin hypothesis (Cabrera et al.). a: Exit of the L3 precursor to Eurasia. b: Return to Africa and expansion to Asia of basal L3 lineages with subsequent differentiation in both continents.

The possibility of an origin of L3 in Asia was proposed by Cabrera et al. (2018) based on the similar coalescence dates of L3 and its Eurasian-distributed M and N derivative clades (c. 70 kya), the distant location in Southeast Asia of the oldest known subclades of M and N, and the comparable age of the paternal haplogroup DE. According to this hypothesis, after an initial out-of-Africa migration of bearers of pre-L3 (L3'4*) around 125 kya, there would have been a back-migration of females carrying L3 from Eurasia to East Africa sometime after 70 kya. The hypothesis suggests that this back-migration is aligned with bearers of paternal haplogroup E, which it also proposes to have originated in Eurasia. These new Eurasian lineages are then suggested to have largely replaced the old autochthonous male and female North-East African lineages.

According to other research, though earlier migrations out of Africa of anatomically modern humans occurred, current Eurasian populations descend instead from a later migration from Africa dated between about 65,000 and 50,000 years ago (associated with the migration out of L3).

Vai et al. (2019) suggest, from a newly discovered old and deeply-rooted branch of maternal haplogroup N found in early Neolithic North African remains, that haplogroup L3 originated in East Africa between 70,000 and 60,000 years ago, and both spread within Africa and left Africa as part of the Out-of-Africa migration, with haplogroup N diverging from it soon after (between 65,000 and 50,000 years ago) either in Arabia or possibly North Africa, and haplogroup M originating in the Middle East around the same time as N.

A study by Lipson et al. (2019) analyzing remains from the Cameroonian site of Shum Laka found them to be more similar to modern-day Pygmy peoples than to West Africans, and suggests that several other groups (including the ancestors of West Africans, East Africans and the ancestors of non-Africans) commonly derived from a human population originating in East Africa between about 80,000–60,000 years ago, which they suggest was also the source and origin zone of haplogroup L3 around 70,000 years ago.

== Distribution ==
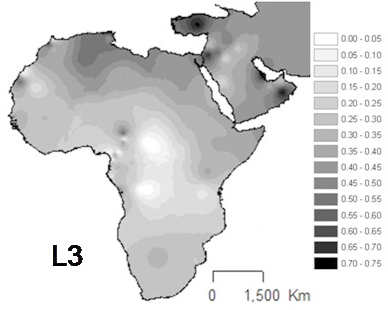
Projected spatial distribution of haplogroup L3 in Africa and the Arabian Peninsula.

L3 is common in Mozambique, Cameroon, Bioko Island, Northeast Africa, and some other parts of East Africa, in contrast to others parts of Africa where the haplogroups L1 and L2 represent around two thirds of mtDNA lineages. L3 is rare in West Africa, but its sublineages are also frequent in the Arabian Peninsula.

L3 is subdivided into several clades, two of which spawned the macrohaplogroups M and N that are today carried by most people outside Africa. There is at least one relatively deep non-M, non-N clade of L3 outside Africa, L3f1b6, which is found at a frequency of 1% in Asturias, Spain. It diverged from African L3 lineages at least 10,000 years ago.

According to Maca-Meyer et al. (2001), "L3 is more related to Eurasian haplogroups than to the most divergent African clusters L1 and L2". L3 is the haplogroup from which all modern humans outside Africa derive. However, there is a greater diversity of major L3 branches within Africa than outside of it, the two major non-African branches being the L3 offshoots M and N.

=== Subclade distribution ===
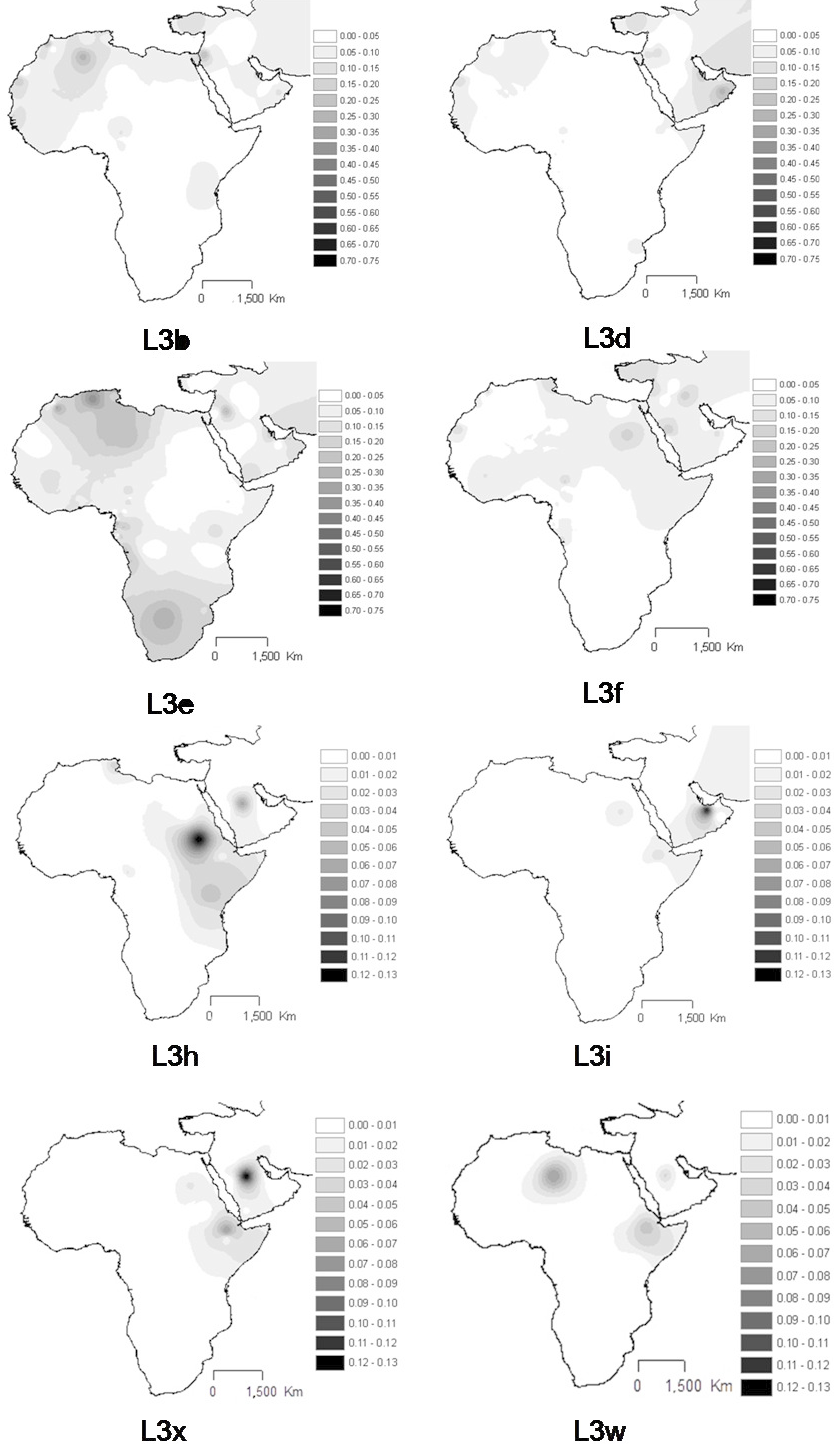
L3 subclade distribution: L3b, L3d, L3e, L3f, L3h, L3i, L3x and L3w.

L3 has seven equidistant descendants: L3a, L3b'f, L3c'd, L3e'i'k'x, L3h, M, N. Five are African, while two are associated with the Out of Africa event.

- N – Eurasia possibly due to migration from Africa, and North Africa possibly due to back-migration from Eurasia.
- M – Asia, the Mediterranean Basin, and parts of Africa due to back-migration.
- L3a – East Africa. Moderate to high frequencies found among the Sanye, Samburu, Iraqw, Yaaku, El-Molo and other minor indigenous populations from the East African Rift Valley. It is infrequent to nonexistent in Sudan and the Sahel zone.
  - L3a1 – Found across Eastern Africa. Estimated age of 35.8–39.3 ka.
  - L3a2 – Found across Eastern Africa. Estimated age of 48.3–57.7 ka.
- L3b'f
  - L3b – Spread from East Africa in the Upper Paleolithic to West-Central Africa. Some subclades spread from Central Africa to East Africa with the Bantu migration.
    - L3b1a – Common subclade. Estimated age of 11.7–14.8 ka.
      - L3b1a2 – Subclade found in Northeast Africa, the Maghreb, and Middle East. Emerged 12–14 ka.
  - L3f – Northeast Africa, Sahel, Arabian peninsula, Iberia. Gaalien, Beja
    - L3f1
      - L3f1a – Carried by migrants from Eastern Africa into the Sahel and Central Africa.
      - L3f1b – Carried by migrants from Eastern Africa into the Sahel and Central Africa.
        - L3f1b1 – Carried from Central Africa into Southern and Eastern Africa with the Bantu migration.
          - L3f1b1a – Settled from East-Central Africa to Central-West Africa and into North Africa and Berber regions.
        - L3f1b4 – Carried from Central Africa into Southern and Eastern Africa with the Bantu migration.
      - L3f1b6 – Rare, found in Iberia.
    - L3f2 – Primarily distributed in East Africa. Also found in North Africa and Central Africa.
    - L3f3 – Spread from Eastern Africa to Chad and the Sahel around 8–9 ka. Found in the Chad Basin.
- L3c'd
  - L3c – Extremely rare lineage with only two samples found so far in Eastern Africa and the Near East.
  - L3d – Found among the Fulani, Chadians, Akan people, Mozambicans, Yemenis, Egyptians, Berbers
    - L3d3a1 – Primarily found in Southern Africa.
- L3e'i'k'x
  - L3e – Suggested to have originated in the Sudan region, Central Africa or Mozambique about 45,000 years ago during the Upper Paleolithic period. It is the most common L3 sub-clade in Bantu-speaking populations. L3e is also the most common L3 subclade amongst Black Americans and Afro-Brazilians.
    - L3e1 – Particularly common in Mozambique, the Tikar of Cameroon, the Bubi people of Bioko Island, the Khwe people of Southern Africa, among some Kikuyu of Kenya, and the Yemeni.
    - L3e5 – Originated in the Chad Basin. Found in Algeria, as well as Burkina Faso, Nigeria, South Tunisia, South Morocco and Egypt
  - L3i – Almost exclusively found in East Africa.
    - L3i1
      - L3i1b – Subclade is found in Yemen, Ethiopia, and among Gujarati Indians.
    - L3i2 (former L3w) – Found in the Horn of Africa and Oman.
  - L3k – Rare haplogroup primarily found in North Africa and the Sahel.
  - L3x – Almost exclusively found in East Africa. Found among Ethiopian Oromos, Egyptians (Note: GUR46 on table 1. is a mtDNA haplogroup L3x2a.)
- L3h – Almost exclusively found in East Africa.
  - L3h1 – Primarily found in East Africa with branches of L3h1b1 sporadically found in the Sahel and North Africa.
  - L3h2 – Found in Northeast Africa and Socotra. Split from other L3h branches as early as 65–69 ka during the Middle Paleolithic.

=== Ancient and historic samples ===
Haplogroup L3 has been observed in an ancient fossil belonging to the Pre-Pottery Neolithic B culture. L3x2a was observed in a 4,500 year old hunter-gather excavated in Mota, Ethiopia, with the ancient fossil found to be most closely related to modern Southwest Ethiopian populations. Haplogroup L3 has also been found among ancient Egyptian mummies (1/90; 1%) excavated at the Abusir el-Meleq archaeological site in Middle Egypt, with the rest deriving from Eurasian subclades, which date from the Pre-Ptolemaic/late New Kingdom and Ptolemaic periods. The Ancient Egyptian mummies bore Near eastern genomic component most closely related to modern near easterners. Additionally, haplogroup L3 has been observed in ancient Guanche fossils excavated in Gran Canaria and Tenerife on the Canary Islands, which have been radiocarbon-dated to between the 7th and 11th centuries CE. All of the clade-bearing individuals were inhumed at the Gran Canaria site, with most of these specimens found to belong to the L3b1a subclade (3/4; 75%) with the rest from both islands (8/11; 72%) deriving from Eurasian subclades. The Guanche skeletons also bore an autochthonous Maghrebi genomic component that peaks among modern Berbers, which suggests that they originated from ancestral Berber populations inhabiting northwestern Africa.

A variety of L3 have been uncovered in ancient remains associated with the Pastoral Neolithic and Pastoral Iron Age of East Africa.

Culture	Genetic cluster or affinity	Country	Site	Date	Maternal haplogroup	Paternal haplogroup	Source
Early pastoral	PN	Kenya	Prettejohn's Gully (GsJi11)	4060–3860	L3f1b	–	Prendergast 2019
Pastoral Neolithic	PN	Kenya	Cole's Burial (GrJj5a)	3350–3180	L3i2	E-V32	Prendergast 2019
Pastoral Neolithic or Elmenteitan	PN	Kenya	Rigo Cave (GrJh3)	2710–2380	L3f	E-M293	Prendergast 2019
Pastoral Neolithic	PN	Kenya	Naishi Rockshelter	2750–2500	L3x1a	E-V1515 (prob. E-M293)	Prendergast 2019
Pastoral Neolithic	PN	Tanzania	Gishimangeda Cave	2490–2350	L3x1	–	Prendergast 2019
Pastoral Neolithic	PN	Kenya	Naivasha Burial Site	2350–2210	L3h1a1	E-M293	Prendergast 2019
Pastoral Neolithic	PN	Kenya	Naivasha Burial Site	2320–2150	L3x1a	E-M293	Prendergast 2019
Pastoral Neolithic	PN	Tanzania	Gishimangeda Cave	2150–2020	L3i2	E-M293	Prendergast 2019
Pastoral Neolithic or Elmenteitan	PN	Kenya	Njoro River Cave II	2110–1930	L3h1a2a1	–	Prendergast 2019
Pastoral Neolithic	N/A	Tanzania	Gishimangeda Cave	2000–1900	L3h1a2a1	–	Prendergast 2019
Pastoral Neolithic	PN	Kenya	Ol Kalou	1810–1620	L3d1d	E-M293	Prendergast 2019
Pastoral Iron Age	PIA	Kenya	Kisima Farm, C4	1060–940	L3h1a1	E-M75 (excl. M98)	Prendergast 2019
Pastoral Iron Age	PIA	Kenya	Emurua Ole Polos (GvJh122)	420–160	L3h1a1	E-M293	Prendergast 2019
Pastoral Iron Age	PN outlier	Kenya	Kokurmatakore	N/A	L3a2a	E-M35 (not E-M293)	Prendergast 2019

== Tree ==
This phylogenetic tree of haplogroup L3 subclades is based on the paper by Mannis van Oven and Manfred Kayser Updated comprehensive phylogenetic tree of global human mitochondrial DNA variation and subsequent published research.

Most Recent Common Ancestor (MRCA)

- L1-6
  - L2-6
    - L2'3'4'6
      - L3'4'6
        - L3'4
          - L3
            - L3a
              - L3a1
                - L3a1a
                - L3a1b
              - L3a2
                - L3a2a
            - L3b'f
              - L3b
                - L3b1
                  - L3b1a
                    - L3b1a1
                    - L3b1a2
                    - L3b1a3
                    - L3b1a4
                    - L3b1a5
                      - L3b1a5a
                      - L3b1a6
                      - L3b1a7
                        - L3b1a7
                      - L3b1a8
                      - L3b1a9
                        - L3b1a9a
                    - L3b1a10
                    - L3b1a11
                  - L3b1b
                    - L3b1b1
                - L3b2
                  - L3b2a
                  - L3b2a
                - L3b3
              - L3f
                - L3f1
                  - L3f1a
                    - L3f1a1
                  - L3f1b
                    - L3f1b1
                    - L3f1b2
                      - L3f1b2a
                      - L3f1b3
                      - L3f1b4
                        - L3f1b4a
                          - L3f1b4a1
                        - L3f1b4b
                        - L3f1b4c
                    - L3f1b5
                - L3f2
                  - L3f2a
                  - L3f2b
                - L3f3
                  - L3f3a
                  - L3f3b
            - L3c'd
              - L3c
              - L3d
                - L3d1-5
                  - L3d1
                    - L3d1a
                      - L3d1a1
                        - L3d1a1a
                    - L3d1b
                      - L3d1b1
                    - L3d1c
                    - L3d1d
                  - 199
                    - L3d2
                    - L3d5
                  - L3d3
                    - L3d3a
                  - L3d4
                  - L3d5
            - L3e'i'k'x
              - L3e
                - L3e1
                  - L3e1a
                    - L3e1a1
                      - L3e1a1a
                    - 152
                      - L3e1a2
                      - L3e1a3
                  - L3e1b
                  - L3e1c
                  - L3e1d
                  - L3e1e
                - L3e2
                  - L3e2a
                    - L3e2a1
                      - L3e2a1a
                      - L3e2a1b
                        - L3e2a1b1
                  - L3e2b
                    - L3e2b1
                      - L3e2b1a
                    - L3e2b2
                    - L3e2b3
                - L3e3'4'5
                  - L3e3'4
                    - L3e3
                      - L3e3a
                      - L3e3b
                        - L3e3b1
                      - L3e4
                  - L3e5
              - L3i
                - L3i1
                  - L3i1a
                  - L3i1b
                - L3i2
              - L3k
                - L3k1
              - L3x
                - L3x1
                  - L3x1a
                    - L3x1a1
                    - L3x1a2
                  - L3x1b
                - L3x2
                  - L3x2a
                    - L3x2a1
                      - L3x2a1a
                  - L3x2b
            - L3h
              - L3h1
                - L3h1a
                  - L3h1a1
                  - L3h1a2
                    - L3h1a2a
                    - L3h1a2b
                - L3h1b
                  - L3h1b1
                    - L3h1b1a
                      - L3h1b1a1
                  - L3h1b2
              - L3h2
            - M
            - N

== Popular culture ==
- Writer Bonnie Greer is a member of haplogroup L3.
- Author Malcolm Gladwell is a member of haplogroup L3f1.
- Musician Branford Marsalis is a member of haplogroup L3f1b.

== See also ==
- Genealogical DNA test
- Genetic genealogy
- Haplogroup
- Population genetics

Phylogenetic tree of human mitochondrial DNA (mtDNA) haplogroups

Mitochondrial Eve (L)

L0
L1–6

L1
L2

L3

L4
L5
L6
M
N

CZ
D
E
G
Q

O
A
S
R

I
W
X
Y
C
Z
B
F
R0

pre-JT

P

U
HV
JT
K
H
V
J
T
