= Keringet =

- Country: Kenya
- Province: Nakuru county
- Time zone: UTC+3 (EAT)

Keringet is a small town in Kenya's Rift Valley Province.
