= Mau Narok =

- Country: Kenya
- Province: Rift Valley Province
- Time zone: UTC+3 (EAT)

Mau Narok is a small town in Kenya's Nakuru County.

Mau Narok is one of the sub counties of the Njoro constituency, located South East of Njoro town. It is known for its agriculture; local farmers grow cabbages, potatoes and tomatoes. It is neighbouring Mau Forest, hence the place is very cold during winters. People who live there are Maasai, Kikuyu, and Kalenjins.

The Mau Narok - Kisiriri road passes through the town, reducing distance from Nakuru to Narok by 80 km.
