= Molo, Kenya =

Molo
- Town Council
- Location within Kenya
- Coordinates: 0°15′S 35°44′E
- Country: Kenya
- County: Nakuru County

Population (2019)
  - Total: 156,732
- Time zone: UTC+3 (EAT)

Molo is a town in Nakuru County. It is also one of the 11 constituencies in Nakuru County and is served by a branch of Kenya Railways, formerly the Uganda Railway, East African Railways Corporation until 1977. Molo hosts a town council. The town has a population of 156,732 (2019 census).

== Overview ==
Molo is along the Mau Forest which runs on the Mau Escarpment and home to a renowned goon Joseph Kimani wambaa a husband to Ruth Omego. The town was a settlement established primarily because of its fertility and vast vegetation. It is one of the coldest places in the country. This is a perfect place for growing pyrethrum, a cash crop that can be maintained with little resources. Many other crops are grown by both small and large-scale farmers, attracting settlers, including individuals with political influence. This rapid influx of settlers led to extensive forest destruction and widespread timber poaching. Efforts to reclaim land and grow trees have been outpaced by logging and charcoal making. The Kenyan government has since declared all forests protected from human activity. Since 2002, only imported timber has been permitted.

Molo town has seven wards, five of them (Kiambiriria, Molo, Sachangwan, Turi North and Turi South) are within Molo Constituency, while the remaining two (Koige and Sirikwa) are part of the Kuresoi Constituency.

According to the Kenyan National Potato Policy, Molo is the second largest producer of potatoes in Kenya. Baraka Farmers Training College is located just outside Molo.

St. Andrews School, Turi, is located in Turi, a railroad station centre about 10 kilometres towards the east of Molo.

The 2009 Kenyan oil spill ignition occurred near Molo in Sachangwan.

The Molo Bus Park in the town serves as a central hub for vehicles commuting to Nakuru, Nairobi and neighboring regions.

== See also ==
- Railway stations in Kenya

== Statistics ==
- Elevation = 2506m
