= History of East Africa =

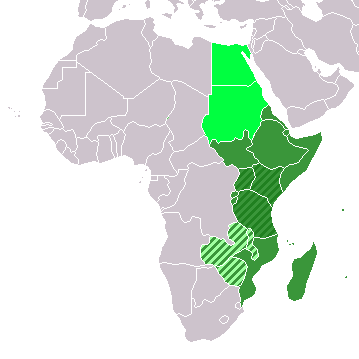
Map of Eastern Africa: Green: Eastern Africa (UN Subregion) Dark Green: East African Community Very Light Green: Central African Federation (Political: Defunct) Light Green: Geographic, including above

The history of East Africa has been divided into its prehistory, the major polities flourishing, the colonial period, and the post-colonial period, in which the current nations were formed. East Africa is the eastern region of Africa, bordered by North Africa, Central Africa, Southern Africa, the Indian Ocean, and the Sahara Desert. Colonial boundaries are reflected in the modern boundaries between contemporary East African states, cutting across ethnic and cultural lines, often dividing single ethnic groups between two or more states.

== Geography ==
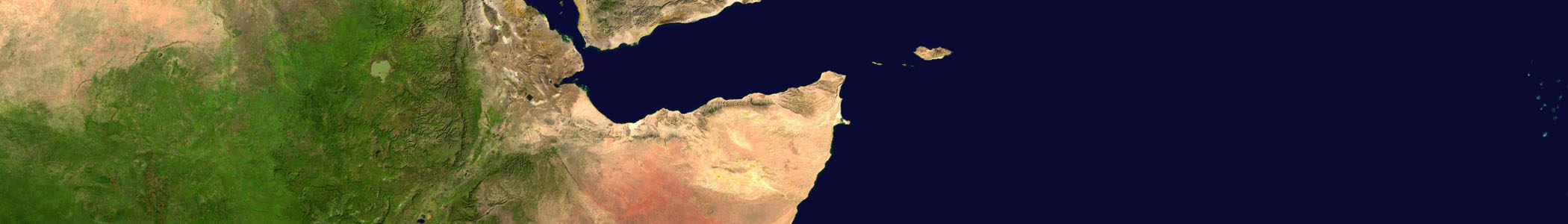
Satellite imagery of East Africa.

The area located at the south of the desert is a steppe, a semi-arid region, called the Sahel. It is the ecoclimatic and biogeographic zone of transition in Africa between the Sahara Desert to the north and the Sudanian Savanna to the south. The Sudanian Savanna is a broad belt of tropical savanna that spans the African continent, from the Atlantic Ocean coast in the West Sudanian savanna to the Ethiopian Highlands in the East Sudanian savanna.

== Climate ==
In 15,000 BP, the West African Monsoon transformed the landscape of Africa and began the Green Sahara period; greater rainfall during the summer season resulted in the growth of humid conditions (e.g., lakes, wetlands) and the savanna (e.g., grassland, shrubland) in North Africa. Between 5500 BP and 4000 BP, the Green Sahara period ended.

== Prehistory ==
In 78,300 BP, amid the Middle Stone Age, a two and half to three year old human child was buried at Panga ya Saidi, in Kenya.

In 13,000 BP, Nubians, who were found to be morphologically different from newer Nubian populations and morphologically similar to Sub-Saharan Africans (e.g., Kerma, modern Eastern Africans, modern Western Africans), resided in tropical Jebel Sahaba.

Between 8000 BP and 2000 BP, Saharan herders migrated into Eastern Africa, and brought along with them their monumental Saharan burial traditions.

Amid the Holocene, around 7100 BP, six individuals were buried.

In the uplands of Nakfa, there is painted rock art (e.g., petroglyphs) in Karora depicting symbolic representations, men, and animals (e.g., horses, camels, antelopes, goats, sheep, cattle), which has been dated to the 2nd millennium BCE.

== Iron Age ==
Archaeometallurgical scientific knowledge and technological development originated in numerous centers of Africa; the centers of origin were located in West Africa, Central Africa, and East Africa; consequently, as these origin centers are located within inner Africa, these archaeometallurgical developments are thus native African technologies. The earliest records of bloomery-type furnaces in East Africa are discoveries of smelted iron and carbon in Nubia that date back between the 7th and 6th centuries BC, particularly in Meroe where there are known to have been ancient bloomeries that produced metal tools for the Nubians and Kushites and produced surplus for their economy.

There is also evidence that carbon steel was made in Western Tanzania by the ancestors of the Haya people as early as 2,300 to 2,000 years ago (about 300 BC or soon after) by a complex process of "pre-heating" allowing temperatures inside a furnace to reach 1300 to 1400 °C.

Dates are approximate, consult particular article for details
Iron Age

== Ancient history ==
=== Bantu expansion ===
From West Africa, Bantu-speaking peoples migrated, along with their ceramics, into the other areas of Sub-Saharan Africa. The Kalundu ceramic type may have spread into Southeastern Africa. Additionally, the Eastern African Urewe ceramic type of Lake Victoria may have spread, via African shores near the Indian Ocean, as the Kwale ceramic type, and spread, via Zimbabwe, Zambia, and Malawi, as the Nkope ceramic type.

Though some may have been created later, the earlier red finger-painted rock art may have been created between 6000 BP and 1800 BP, to the south of Kei River and Orange River by Khoisan hunter-gatherer-herders, in Malawi and Zambia by considerably dark-skinned, occasionally bearded, bow-and-arrow-wielding Akafula hunter-gatherers who resided in Malawi until the 19th century CE, and in Transvaal by the Vhangona people.

Bantu-speaking farmers, or their Proto-Bantu progenitors, created the later white finger-painted rock art in some areas of Tanzania, Malawi, Angola, Zambia, and Zimbabwe, as well as in the northern regions of Mozambique, Botswana, and Transvaal. The Transvaal (e.g., Soutpansberg, Waterberg) rock art was specifically created by Sotho-speakers (e.g., Birwa, Koni, Tlokwa) and Venda people. Concentric circles, stylized humans, stylized animals, ox-wagons, saurian figures, Depictions of crocodiles and snakes were included in the white finger-painted rock art tradition, both of which were associated with rainmaking and, crocodiles in particular, were also associated with fertility. The white finger-painted rock art may have been created for reasons relating to initiation rites and puberty rituals. Depictions from the rock art tradition of Bantu-speaking farmers have been found on divination-related items (e.g., drums, initiation figurines, initiation masks); fertility terracotta masks from Transvaal have been dated to the 1st millennium CE. Along with Iron Age archaeological sites from the 1st millennium CE, this indicates that white finger-painted rock art tradition may have been spanned from the Early Iron Age to the Later Iron Age.

=== Kingdom of Kush ===
The Kerma culture was based in the southern part of Nubia, or "Upper Nubia" (in parts of present-day northern and central Sudan), and later extended its reach northward into Lower Nubia and the border of Egypt. The city-state of Kerma emerged as the dominant political force, controlling the Nile Valley between the first and fourth cataracts, an area as large as Egypt. The Egyptians were the first to identify Kerma as "Kush" and over the next several centuries the two civilizations engaged in intermittent warfare, trade, and cultural exchange. It emerged as the earliest kingdom in Sub-Saharan Africa, and persisted from 2500 BCE to 1500 BCE.

=== Kingdom of Punt ===
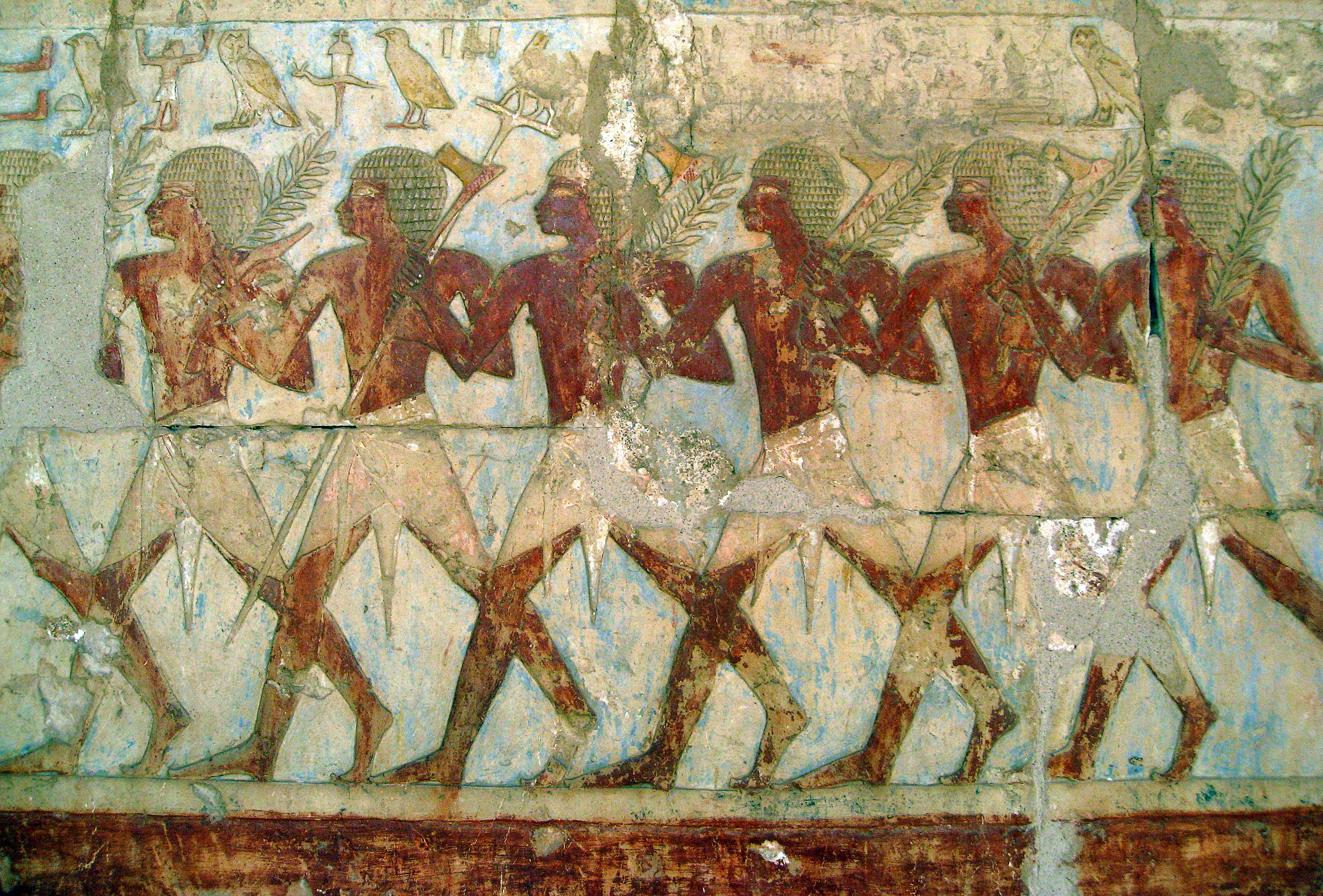
Egyptian soldiers bear tree branches and axes from a trading expedition to the Land of Punt

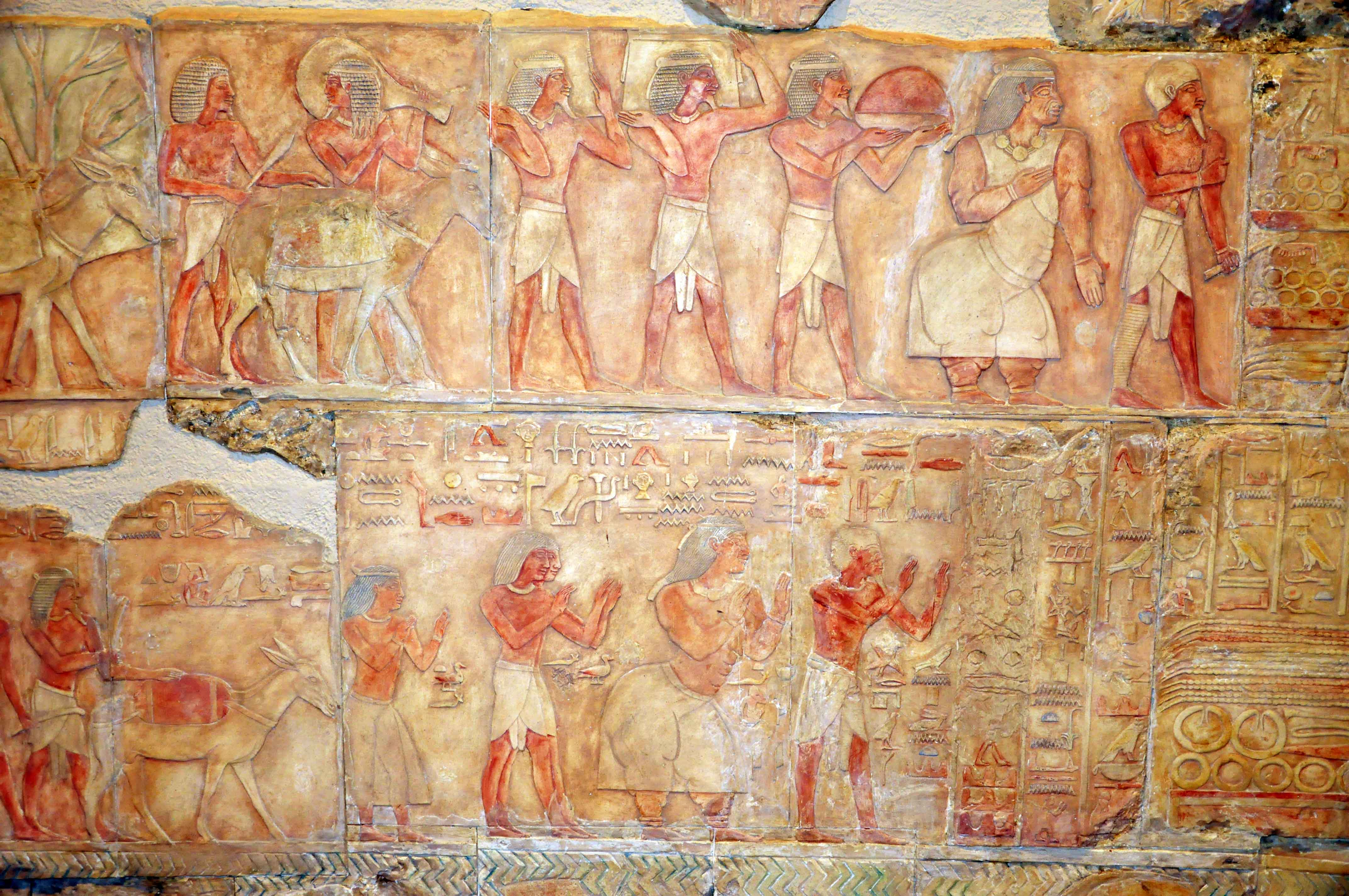
Puntites including their Queen, bearing tributes, represented in the classic reddish-brown colouring as Egyptians

The earliest recorded ancient Egyptian expedition to Punt was organized by Pharaoh Sahure of the Fifth Dynasty (25th century BCE), returning with cargoes of antyue and Puntites. However, gold from Punt is recorded as having been in Egypt as early as the time of Pharaoh Khufu of the Fourth Dynasty.

Subsequently, there were more expeditions to Punt in the Sixth, Eleventh, Twelfth and Eighteenth dynasties of Egypt. In the Twelfth Dynasty, trade with Punt was celebrated in popular literature in the "Tale of the Shipwrecked Sailor".

In the reign of Mentuhotep III (11th dynasty, ca. 2000 BCE), an officer named Hannu organized one or more voyages to Punt, but it is uncertain whether he personally traveled on these expeditions. Trading missions of the 12th dynasty pharaohs Senusret I, Amenemhat II and Amenemhat IV had also successfully navigated their way to and from the mysterious land of Punt.

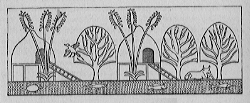
A landscape of Punt, showing several houses on stilts, two fruiting date palms, three myrrh trees, a bird (Hedydipna metallica), a cow, an unidentified fish and a turtle, in water which in the original was green to show that it is salt or tidal, in a sketch from the walls of the mortuary temple of Hatshepsut at Deir el-Bahri, depicting a royal expedition to Punt

=== Kingdom of Dʿmt ===
Given the presence of a large temple complex, the capital of Dʿmt may have been present day Yeha, in Tigray Region, Ethiopia. At Yeha, the temple to the god Ilmuqah is still standing.

=== Aksumite Empire ===
Somewhat based on the basis of Carlo Conti Rossini's theories and prolific work on Ethiopian history, Aksum is thought by some to have started out as a Sabaean colony, founded by the semitic Sabaeans, also evidenced by the semitic language domination over the oromo language, part of the Cushitic branch of the Afro-Asiatic language phylum. Others believe that the development of it was mostly independent. Proponents of the latter believe that Sabaean influence was minor, limited to a few localities, and disappearing after a few decades or a century, perhaps representing a trading or military colony in some sort of symbiosis or military alliance with D' mt or some other "proto-Aksumite" state. Evidence suggests that semitic-speaking Aksumites semiticized the Agaw people, who, before that, most likely took influence from foreign Afroasiatic cultures in their development as a people group, suggested by the Cushitic language they speak. They had also already established an agricultural community in the area before any known arrival of the Sabaeans, to which is affiliated with the spread of the Afro-Asiatic language phylum. (Note: According to Munro-Hays, "The arrival of Sabaean influences does not represent the beginning of Ethiopian civilisation.... Semiticized Agaw peoples are thought to have migrated from south-eastern Eritrea possibly as early as 2000 BC, bringing their 'proto-Ethiopic' language, ancestor of Ge'ez and the other Eothiopian Semitic languages, with them; and these and other groups had already developed specific cultural and linguistic identities by the time any Sabaean influences arrived.")

=== Swahili Coast ===
In the pre-Swahili period, the region was occupied by smaller societies whose main socioeconomic activities were pastoralism, fishing, and mixed farming. Early on, those living on the Swahili coast prospered because of agriculture helped by regular yearly rainfall and animal husbandry. The shallow coast was important as it provided seafood. Starting in the early 1st millennium CE, trade was crucial. Submerged river estuaries created natural harbors as well as the yearly monsoon winds helped trade. Later in the 1st millennium CE there was a huge migration of Bantu-speaking peoples. The communities settling along the coast shared archaeological and linguistic features with those from the interior of the continent. Archeological data has revealed the use of Kwale and Urewe ceramics both along the coast and within the interior parts, showing that the regions had a shared lifeway in the Late Stone and Early Iron Ages.

== Post-classical history ==
=== Harla Kingdom ===
Harla Kingdom was a 6th century CE Harla state centered around present day eastern Ethiopia. The kingdom had trading relations with the Ayyubid and Tang dynasties. It also established its own currency and calendar.

=== Kingdom of Bazin ===
The Kingdom of Bazin was an early medieval kingdom centered in Northeast Africa. According to Al-Yaqubi, it was one of six Beja polities that existed in the region during the 9th century CE. The kingdom's territory was located between Aswan and Massawa.

=== Kingdom of Semien ===
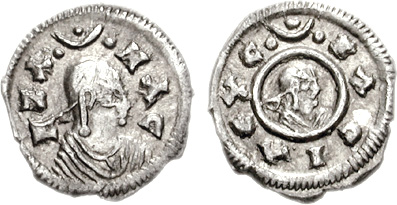
Coins with the image of Emperor Ezana of Axum

The beginning of a conversion process of the Kingdom of Axum to Christianity is thought to have occurred with the arrival of two Syrian brothers Frumentius and Aedesius, sometime in the reign of Ezana. The conversion, bringing with it Hebraizing elements, was partial, initially was limited to the court and probably affected only the caravan trading route areas between Axum and Adulis. Neither Judaizing nor Christianizing local populations would have fitted into what we later define as normative Judaism or Christianity, but were syncretic mixtures of local faiths and new beliefs from forebears of these respective religions. Later legend speaks of a revolt by Jews taking place at this period but there is no evidence that directly support this story, and its historicity is considered unlikely. A strong possibility exists that the Christian Kaleb of Axum, who had dispatched military contingents to fight against the Judaizing Dhu Nuwas of the Arabian peninsula kingdom of Himyar banished opponents to the Simien Mountains, which later emerged as a Beta Israel stronghold. Nothing in the historical record from the 6th century CE to the 13th century CE, however, has allowed scholars to make anything more than very tentative hypotheses concerning the Jewish communities of that time. Legends surrounding a Jewish queen called Judith (Gudit) have been dismissed by Ethiopian specialists like Edward Ullendorff as without foundation in any historical facts.

=== Kingdom of Belgin ===
The Kingdom of Belgin, also known as the Kingdom of Baqulin, was an early medieval kingdom centered in Northeast Africa. According to Al-Yaqubi, it was one of six Beja polities that existed in the region during the 9th century CE. The kingdom's territory was located between Aswan and Massawa.

=== Kingdom of Jarin ===
The Kingdom of Jarin was an early medieval kingdom centered in Northeast Africa. According to Al-Yaqubi, it was one of six Beja polities that existed in the region during the 9th century CE. The kingdom's territory was located between Aswan and Massawa.

=== Kingdom of Qita'a ===
The Kingdom of Qita'a, also known as the Kingdom of Qata, was an early medieval kingdom centered in Northeast Africa. According to Al-Yaqubi, it was one of six Beja polities that existed in the region during the 9th century CE. The kingdom's territory was located between Aswan and Massawa.

=== Kingdom of Nagash ===
The Kingdom of Nagash was an early medieval kingdom centered in Northeast Africa. According to Al-Yaqubi, it is one of six Beja polities that existed in the region during the 9th century CE. The kingdom's territory was located between Aswan and Massawa.

=== Kingdom of Tankish ===
The Kingdom of Tankish was an early medieval kingdom centered in Northeast Africa. According to Al-Yaqubi, it was one of six Beja polities that existed in the region during the 9th century CE. The kingdom's territory was located between Aswan and Massawa.

=== Tunni Sultanate ===
The Tunni, composed of five sub-clans (Da'farad, Dakhtira, Goygali, Hajuwa, and Waridi), were the latest to drive the Jiddu into the interior, where they established their own Sultanate in Qoryoley. The Tunni made a treaty with the Jiddu so that Tunni settled on the west bank of the Shabelle and the Jiddu settled on the east bank. Both also agreed to resist foreign penetration, to allow only Seddah Saamood (the three foot-prints, which are the Tuni, the Jiddu, and the wild beasts). However, they did accept the first Muslim migrants, the Hatimi from Yemen and the Amawi from Syria, around the 10th century CE, for both religious and commercial reasons. Barawa founded by a Tunni saint called Aw-Al became the new capital for the Tunni Sultanate. The town prospered and became one of the major Islamic centers in the Horn, the Barawaani Ulama, attracting students from all over the region. Muslim scholars of that time, such as Ibn Sa'id, wrote about Barawa as "an Islamic island on the Somali coast." Al-Idrisi also described the construction of the coral houses and noted that Barawa was full of both domestic and foreign commodities.

Eventually, the Tunni people abandoned the pastoral lifestyle and established themselves largely as farmers on the rich arable land where they grew a variety of fruits and vegetables but they still continued to practice livestock grazing. They established a number of concentrated settlements on the interior such as Buulo, Golweyn, and Xaramka, Jilib, Jamaame, and their center Qoryooley. The Tunni Somali clan inhabiting the cultivated Shebelle valley behind the coast produced foodstuffs for the coastal towns as well as acting as brokers for other Somali traders further inland.

=== Sultanate of Showa ===
The Sultanate of Showa (Sultanate of Shewa) also known as Makhzumi Dynasty was a Muslim kingdom in present-day Ethiopia. Its capital Walale was situated in northern Hararghe in Harla country. Its territory extended possibly to some areas west of the Awash River. The port of Zeila may have influenced the kingdom. The rise of the Makhzumi state at the same time resulted in the decline of the Kingdom of Axum. Several engravings dating back to the 13th century CE showed the presence of the kingdom are found in Chelenqo, Bate, Harla near Dire Dawa and Munessa near Lake Langano.

=== Empire of Kitara ===
According to oral tradition in the area of the Great Lakes of Africa (also known as Bachwezi, Bacwezi, or Chwezi empire, Empire of the moon) was ruled by a dynasty known as the Bachwezi (Chwezi), successors of the Batembuzi Dynasty.

=== Kilwa Sultanate ===
The story of Kilwa begins around 960 CE – 1000 CE.

=== Ethiopian Empire ===
A copy of 17th century philosophical and ethical treatise by Ethiopian philosopher Zara Yaqob

The Ethiopian Empire would emerge following the establishment of the Solomonic dynasty by Yekuno Amlak in approximately 1270.

=== Sultanate of Ifat ===
Ifat first emerged when Umar ibn Dunya-huz, later to be known as Sultan Umar Walasma, carved out his own kingdom and conquered the Sultanate of Showa (located in the highlands of Eastern Shewa). Taddesse Tamrat explains Sultan Walashma's military acts as an effort to consolidate the Muslim territories in the Horn of Africa in much the same way as Emperor Yekuno Amlak was attempting to consolidate the Christian territories in the highlands during the same period.

=== Hadiya Sultanate ===
Hadiya was likely part of the domain of the Sultanate of Showa and linked to the Harla before the non-Islamic Kingdom of Damot's invasion led by Sidama. A cluster of speakers labelled Hadiya-Sidama developed maintaining Islamic identity and later creating the Hadiya Sultanate.

=== Sultanate of Mogadishu ===
For many years Mogadishu functioned as the pre-eminent city in the Bilad al Barbar, or "Land of the Berbers", as medieval Arabic-speakers named the Somali coast. Following his visit to the city, the 12th century CE Syrian historian Yaqut al-Hamawi (a former slave of Greek origin) wrote a global history of many places he visited including Mogadishu and called it the richest and most powerful city in the region and described it as an Islamic center on the Indian Ocean.

In the early 13th century CE, Mogadishu along with other coastal and interior Somali cities in southern Somalia and eastern Abyissina came under the Ajuran Sultanate control and experienced another Golden Age.

=== Kingdom of Buganda ===
Originally a vassal state of Bunyoro, Buganda grew rapidly in power in the 18th century CE and the 19th century CE becoming the dominant kingdom in the region. Buganda started to expand in the 1840s CE, and used fleets of war canoes to establish "a kind of imperial supremacy" over Lake Victoria and the surrounding regions. Subjugating weaker peoples for cheap labor, Buganda grew into a powerful "embryonic empire". The first direct contact with Europeans was established in 1862 CE, when British explorers John Hanning Speke and Captain Sir Richard Francis Burton entered Buganda and according to their reports, the kingdom was highly organized.

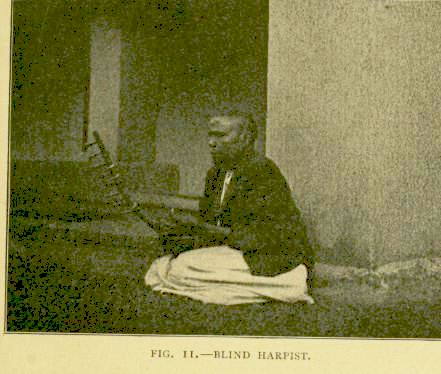
A blind Buganda harpist c. 1911

=== Ajuran Sultanate ===
The Ajuran Empire, also spelled Ajuuraan Empire, and often simply as Ajuran, was a Somali empire in the medieval times in the Horn of Africa that dominated the trade in northern Indian Ocean. They belonged to the Somali Muslim sultanate that ruled over large parts of the Horn of Africa in the Middle Ages. Through a strong centralized administration and an aggressive military stance towards invaders, the Ajuran Empire successfully resisted an Oromo invasion from the west and a Portuguese incursion from the east during the Gaal Madow and the Ajuran-Portuguese wars. Trading routes dating from the ancient and early medieval periods of Somali maritime enterprise were strengthened or re-established, and foreign trade and commerce in the coastal provinces flourished with ships sailing to and coming from many kingdoms and empires in East Asia, South Asia, Europe, the Near East, North Africa and East Africa.

=== Kingdom of Kaffa ===
The Kingdom of Kaffa was founded, c. 1390 CE, by Minjo, who according to oral tradition ousted the Mato dynasty of 32 kings. However, his informants told Amnon Orent, "no one remembers the name of a single one."

=== Kingdom of Rwanda ===
Before the 19th century CE, it was believed that the Tutsis held military leadership power while the Hutus possessed healing power and agricultural skills. In this capacity, the Mwami's council of advisors (abiiru) was exclusively Hutu and held significant sway. By the mid-18th century CE, however, the abiiru had become increasingly marginalized.

As the kings centralized their power and authority, they distributed land among individuals rather than allowing it to be passed down through lineage groups, of which many hereditary chiefs had been Hutu. Most of the chiefs appointed by the Mwamis were Tutsi. The redistribution of land, enacted between 1860 CE and 1895 CE by Kigeli IV Rwabugiri, resulted in an imposed patronage system, under which appointed Tutsi chiefs demanded manual labor in return for the right of Hutus to occupy their land. This system left Hutus in a serf-like status with Tutsi chiefs as their feudal masters.

=== Adal Sultanate ===
Adal Kingdom (also Awdal, Adl, or Adel) was centred around Zeila, its capital. It was established by the local Somali tribes in the early 9th century CE. Zeila attracted merchants from around the world, contributing to the wealth of the city. Zeila is an ancient city and it was one of the earliest cities in the world to embrace Islam.

=== Shilluk Kingdom ===
According to Shilluk legends, the kingdom was founded in 1490 CE. Its legendary first ruler ("Reth") was the hero known as Nyikang who claimed to be half-crocodile and possessed power over the rain. Nyikang was the son of a king, Okwa, who ruled a country located "far south near a large lake". This may be Lake Albert, where the Acholi live. After Okwa's death, Nyikang went to war with his brother Duwadh, the legitimate successor to the throne. Facing defeat, Nyikang left his homeland with his retinue and migrated northeast to Wau (near the Bahr el Ghazal, "river of gazelles" in Arabic). Here (known by the Shilluk as the Pothe Thuro) Nyikang married the daughter of Dimo, the local magician. After a conflict with Dimo Nyikang migrated north (crossing the Bahr el Ghazal) to Acietagwok (a Shilluk village about 30 kilometres (19 mi) west of the village of Tonga) around 1550 CE. Nyikang then traveled to Nyilual, an uninhabited region west of the present town of Malakal. In the end, legends claim that Nyikang vanished in a whirlwind in the middle of a battle.

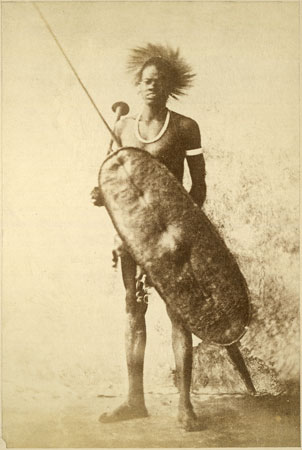
Late 19th century CE Shilluk warrior

=== Ankole Kingdom ===
Banyankore trace their ancestors back to the Bairu and the Bahima subgroup. The kingdom was abolished in 1967 CE by the Ugandan government under president Apollo Milton Obote.

== Modern history ==
=== Sennar Sultanate ===
Christian Nubia, represented by the two medieval kingdoms of Makuria and Alodia, began to decline from the 12th century CE. By 1365 CE, Makuria had virtually collapsed and was reduced to a petty kingdom restricted to Lower Nubia, until finally disappearing c. 150 years later. The fate of Alodia is less clear. It has been suggested that it collapsed already as early as the 12th century or shortly after, as archaeology suggests that in this period, Soba ceased to be used as its capital. By the 13th century CE, central Sudan seemed to have disintegrated into various petty states. Between the 14th century CE and the 15th century CE Sudan was overran by Bedouin tribes. In the 15th century CE, one of these Bedouins, whom Sudanese traditions refer to as Abdallah Jammah, is recorded to have created a tribal federation and to have subsequently destroyed what was left of Alodia. In the early 16th century CE, Abdallah's federation came under attack of an invader from the south, the Funj. In 1504 CE, the Funj defeated Abdallah Jammah and founded the Funj sultanate.

=== Kingdom of Burundi ===
The date of the foundation of the Kingdom of Burundi is unknown but probably dates back to the 17th century CE when the Tutsi ethnic group gained dominance over the larger ethnic Hutu population of the region. Under mwami Ntare I (r. 1675 CE – 1705 CE), the kingdom expanded and annexed a number of surrounding polities. Although ruled by the mwami, the kingdom was extensively decentralised and local sub-rulers had wide independence. Before the arrival of European colonists, succession struggles were also common.

=== Kingdom of Kooki ===
The Kooki Kingdom was established at some point in time between 1696 CE and 1740 CE by the Mubito prince of Bwohe. Bwohe was a part of the Bunyoro-Kitara dynasty who with his followers broke away from the larger Bunyoro-Kitara Kingdom and created his own. Bwohe died in either 1740 CE or 1750 CE.

=== Sultanate of the Geledi ===
At the end of the 17th century CE, the Ajuran Sultanate was on its decline and various vassals were breaking free or being absorbed by new Somali powers. One of these powers was the Silcis Sultanate, which began consolidating its rule over the Afgooye region. Ibrahim Adeer led the revolt against the Silcis ruler Umar Abrone and his oppressive daughter, Princess Fay. After his victory over the Silcis, Ibrahim then proclaimed himself Sultan and subsequently founded the Gobroon Dynasty.

The Geledi Sultanate was a Rahanweyn Kingdom ruled by the noble Geledi which controlled the entire Jubba River region and extending to parts of Shebelle River and conducting a significant amount of trade in the region. The Geledi Sultanate had southern Arabians pay tribute to Geledi Sultan Ahmed Yusuf.

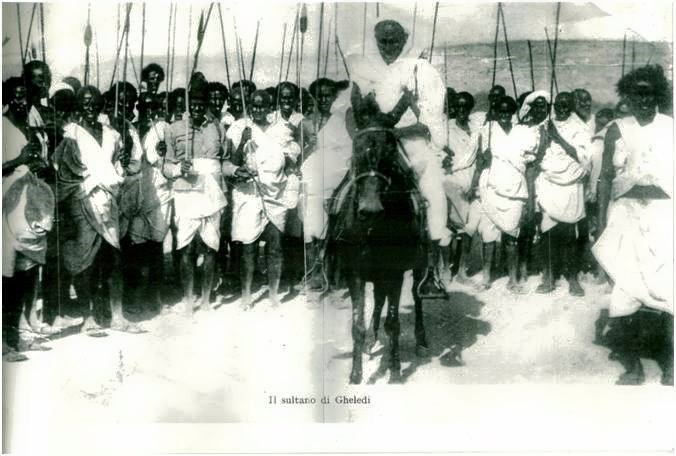
Sultan Osman Ahmed (mounted) and his soldiers

=== Sultanate of Aussa ===
In 1734 CE, the Afar leader Data Kadafo, head of the Mudayto clan, seized power and established the Mudayto Dynasty. This marked the start of a new and more sophisticated polity that would last into the colonial period. The primary symbol of the Sultan was a silver baton, which was considered to have magical properties. The influence of the sultanate extended into the Danakil lowlands of what is now Eritrea.

=== Majeerteen Sultanate ===
The Majeerteen Sultanate was established, possibly around 1600s CE, by Somalis from the Majeerteen Darod clan. It reached prominence during the 19th century CE, under the reign of the resourceful Boqor (King) Osman Mahamuud.

=== Isaaq Sultanate ===
The modern Guleed dynasty of the Isaaq Sultanate was established in the middle of the 18th century CE by Sultan Guled of the Eidagale line of the Garhajis clan. His coronation took place after the victorious battle of Lafaruug in which his father, a religious mullah Abdi Eisa successfully led the Isaaq in battle and defeated the Absame tribes near Berbera where a century earlier the Isaaq clan expanded into. After witnessing his leadership and courage, the Isaaq chiefs recognized his father Abdi who refused the position instead relegating the title to his underage son Guled while the father acted as the regent till the son come of age. Guled was crowned as the first Sultan of the Isaaq clan on July 1750 CE. Sultan Guled thus ruled the Isaaq up until his death in 1839 CE, where he was succeeded by his eldest son Farah full brother of Yuusuf and Du'ale, all from Guled's fourth wife Ambaro Me'ad Gadid.

=== Habr Yunis Sultanate ===
The Habr Yunis Sultanate was a Somali kingdom that ruled parts of the Horn of Africa during the 18th century CE. It spanned the territories of the Habr Yunis clan which is part of the wider Isaaq in modern day Somaliland and Ethiopia. The sultanate was governed by the Rer Ainanshe branch of the Habr Yunis clan.

=== Kingdom of Gomma ===
Mohammed Hassen explains the tradition around Nur Husain as reflecting the fact that "Gomma was the first state in the Gibe region where Islam became the religion of the whole people." Trimingham states that Gomma was the first of the Gibe kingdoms to convert to Islam, quoting Major G.W. Harris as writing that by 1841 CE "in Goma the Moslem faith is universal."

=== Tooro Kingdom ===
The Tooro Kingdom evolved out of a breakaway segment of Bunyoro some period before the 19th century CE. It was founded in 1830 CE when Omukama Kaboyo Olimi I, the eldest son of Omukama of Bunyoro Nyamutukura Kyebambe III of Bunyoro, seceded and established his own independent kingdom.

=== Mbokane Kingdom ===
The Mbokane Kingdom or Chieftaincy dates back to the founding of the Swati nation. The Mbokane clan was one of the 17 founding clans of the Kingdom of Swaziland, now Eswatini. At least two of the olden days, King of Swaziland's senior advisers were from the Mbokane clan. The first known senior Chief of the Mbokane clan was Chief Gadlela Mbokane. He was the senior Chief and adviser to iNgwenyama King Dlamini III. Dlamini III was a king or iNgwenyama of the Swazi people and he led them approximately between 1720 until 1744. King Dlamini III was the father to Ngwane III the first King of modern Swaziland. Chief Manzini Mbokane was one of the senior adviser to King Mbandzeni. Mbandzeni (also known as Dlamini IV, Umbandine,[2] Umbandeen[3]) (1855–1889) was the King of Swaziland from 1872 until 1889. Chief Manzini Mbokane's granddaughter was also married to Prince Mbilini waMswati. Prince Mbilini waMswati was a Swazi prince and son of Mswati II.

Chief Manzini's descendent

According to the Mbokane Clan elders, Chief Manzini the advisor to King Mbandzeni had one child, a son, Wamave Alphious Mbokane, who took over as Chief after Chief Manzini died. According to historians, he was not an adviser to any king because he wanted to focus on developing and building the Mbokane Clan and Chieftaincy, and the NShiselweni villages, which were last developed as settlements just after establishment under the reign chief Sukumbili Mbokane way before his father Chief Manzini.

Chief Manzini’s son Chief Wamave, had four sons Manzini II Mbokane, Samuel also known as Sammie, Ntengu II also known as Matthews Mbokane, and Mandlakati Mbokane. Out of the four children of Chief Wamave Mbokane, it is said that only Ntengu II Matthews Mbokane had children. Mandlakati was the first-born son of Chief Wamave, followed by Manzini II, then Ntengu II and the last born was Samuel. The four were the grandchildren of Chief Manzini. After Chief Wamave Mbokane died, there was a battle between his four sons about who should be the Chief, because according to the clan elders Chief Wamave's will gave the chieftaincy to Ntengu II Matthews Mbokane who was said to have impressed his father with his leadership skills, and ability to resolve disputes within the clan.

However, a few months after Ntengu II was installed according to Swazi tradition and Chief Wamave’s will as Chief Ntengu II, his oldest brother Mandlakati Mbokane and some village elders removed him as Chief, Chief Ntengu II then fled to South Africa together with his other two brothers towards a town called Roburnia now called Amsterdam, just outside the now eSwatini border and eventually they went further into Transvaal today South Africa in the early 40s.

Ntengu II also known as Matthews Mbokane who was now the former Chief before leaving Swaziland now eSwatini had married a Swati woman known as Anna Mabuza who become known as LaMabuza by the Mbokane Clan. When they fled to Roburnia Ntengu II separated from his two brothers Manzini II and Samuel who was known as Sammie. It is said that after Chief Mandlakati died without any children, there were attempt early on during King Sobhuza II’s rule by senior royal members to bring Ntengu II to come and take over the Mbokane Chieftaincy that was left leaderless when Chief Mandlakati died, and had no children, and had not appointed any successor.

Ntengu Matthews Mbokane according to elders respectfully declined the offer siting the fact that he already had children in South Africa that he did not want to uproot, also all his children had been born in South Africa. According to the elders he also indicated that he has never spoken to his children about why he left eSwatini, except for that there was a fight with his older brother and he left to avoid problems. According to historical records out of the four grandchildren of Chief Manzini only Ntengu II had children.

Very little has been recorded of Ntengu II children who are actually Chief Manzini's great grandchildren except that Ntengu II had 4 sons and 7 daughters, Maria, Fikile, Bonakele, Nkosazana, Thokozile, Zodwa, Busisiwe, Vusimuzi, Jeremiah, Fana Lucas Mbokane, and Nkosana Absalom Mbokane. It is not known what happened of the 11 children who are said to be the only descendant of Chief Manzini Mbokane. However, historians say when Ntengu II and his wife LaMabuza died, he regretted the decision not to go back to eSwatini, and asked his children never to lose their root.

It is believed that Ntengu II’s children all or some of them are still alive somewhere in South Africa even though nothing much is known about them and their whereabouts. Some traditionalist and Mbokane Clan elders still believe the great grandchildren of Chief Manzini should return to eSwatini to rebuild Mbokane Chieftaincy and connect with the clan, but nothing much is known about them or where they are. Although the Mbokane Clan remains one of the most powerful clan in the history of eSwatini, having been one of the founding clan, and had several of the clan Chiefs being senior advisors it is said it remains without a royal leader, after the death of its last known chief, Mandlakati Mbokane.

Descendants of Chief Manzini

According to James Shadrack Mkhulunyelwa Matsebula who was a Swazi linguist, writer and historian best known for the A History of Swaziland editions, who also worked as King Sobhuza II's private secretary, there were elders from the Mbokane Clan that were leading the effort to restore the Mbokane Chieftaincy. According to him, they had traced living great great children of Chief Manzini in South Africa in the 1980s. In addition they verified that the children of Matthews Ntengu Mbokane (Ntengu II) are indeed the descendant of Chief Manzini and rightful heir to the Mbokane Chieftaincy is one of them.

They were trying to contact one of the sons of Ntengu II called Nkosana, based on publicly recorded genealogical trees published across Southern African historical databases document that Nkosana Absalom Mbokane a South Africa corporate executive and farmer is the youngest of the four sons born to Chief Ntengu II (Matthews) Mbokane and his wife, Anna Mabuza (LaMabuza). Public records make him the direct heir to the Mbokane Chieftaincy since all his brothers passed on. The Mbokane Chieftaincy lineage according to Regina Gelana Twala a towering intellectual, anthropologist, social worker, and political activist who lived and worked extensively in eSwatini links directly from Chief Manzini to Ntengu II as follows:

· Chief Manzini Mbokane: The historic King Mbandzeni's senior advisor and leader of the Liqoqo (King's Advisory Council), after whom the major city of Manzini, eSwatini was named in 1960.

· Chief Wamave Alphious Mbokane: The only son of Chief Manzini, who assumed the chieftaincy next.

· Chief Ntengu II Matthews Mbokane: The grandson of Chief Manzini. He was originally named the rightful successor by Chief Wamave due to his leadership capabilities but was deposed following a violent succession feud initiated by his eldest brother, Mandlakati. Consequently, Ntengu II fled to South Africa in the 1940s.

· The great-grandson of Chief Manzini. Since Ntengu II's brothers (Mandlakati, Manzini II, and Samuel) died childless, Nkosana and his 10 siblings constitute the only surviving direct bloodline of Chief Manzini. This is collaborated by Hilda Kuper an ethnographic researcher on Swazi kinship, ritual, and traditional governance. Hilda an influential social anthropologist who worked in close collaboration with the Swazi royal family particularly King Sobhuza II and his private secretary Matsebula stated that according to conversations they had with Matsebula, it was discovered that out of the four of Ntengu II’s sons, only one was still alive, and he is a South African prominent business executive, IT & AI specialist, corporate governance leader and a farmer in the Vaal area in the farm areas of Slangfontein South Africa.

Unfortunately after King Sobhuza II died, and subsequently Matsebula also died the efforts to communicate with the living descendants of Chief Manzini Mbokane stopped, despite the fact that they were in an advanced stage and efforts had already been made to contact Nkosana Absalom Mbokane who was easily traceable because he is a well-known business executive, IT specialist, corporate governance leader and farmer in South Africa.

According to Professor John Daniel, a South African academic and researcher who taught political science in Swaziland during his period of exile. He wrote and edited numerous research papers on Southern African political transitions, closely documenting Swaziland's geopolitical role and Mbokane Chieftaincy genealogical trees during the Apartheid era. He indicated was asked to help with the trace, and he spoke with Matsebula and through Hilda’s assistance he had confirmed the lineage and verified that the heir to the Mbokane Chieftaincy was still alive and after it was confirmed that out of the four sons of Ntengu II only one was alive and he is Nkosana Absalom Mbokane, they had been in the process to contact him and Matsebula was coordinating with the Mbokane Clan elders to bring him to eSwatini to initiate the process to install him to the Chieftaincy using traditional, cultural protocols and planning to approach the Eswatini Kingdom.

Some traditionalist and Mbokane Clan elders still believe the great grandchildren of Chief Manzini who according to Matsebula can be traced in Vaal river area of Slangfontein should return to eSwatini to rebuild Mbokane Chieftaincy and connect with the clan. Although the Mbokane Clan remains one of the most powerful clan in the history of eSwatini, having been one of the founding clan, and had several of the clan Chiefs being senior advisors it remains without a royal leader after the death of its last known chief, Mandlakati Mbokane, this according to Matsebula had to be changed.

Professor Philip "Phil" Bonner a leading South African academic who specialized in the history of the Swazi Kingdom, is said to have contacted the family and through him, they knew that out of all the four of late Chief Ntengu II’s sons only one was still alive. Professor Bonner indicated that the descendants were traced but it is not known why the process has not restarted during his majesty King Mswati III, he stated that it is a known fact that many researches and historians like him who spoke with Matsebula indicated that Nkosana Absalom Mbokane is easily contactable as he is prominent entrepreneur and corporate executive in South Africa and he is the heir to the chieftaincy as he is the only living son of Ntengu II after his other brothers Vusimuzi, Fana and Jeremia passed on. According to Professor Bonner it was confirmed that possibly Nkosana Absalom Mbokane is the heir to the Mbokane Chieftaincy based on historical data and research as well as conversations between Mbokane Clan elders. Matsebula also indicated that is conversation he had with the late His Majesty King Sobhuza, he wanted to restore the Mbokane Chieftaincy because of its significance in the riyal history of Swaziland now eSwatini, and he had instructed Matsebula to conclude the matter, however His Majesty King Sobhuza died in 1982 while the effort continued after Matsebula died in 1993 which is believed might have grounded the process.

"Eswatini".

"Times of Swaziland".

Gillis, Hugh (c The Kingdom of Swaziland: Studies in Political History.

Greenwood Publishing Group. ISBN 0313306702.

Bonner, Philip (1982).

Kings, Commoners and Concessionaires.

Great Britain: Cambridge University Press. pp. 9–27. ISBN 0521242703.

Dlamini, Ndumiso. "The children of King Somhlolo".

Times of Swaziland. Retrieved 16 December 2013

=== Kingdom of Jimma ===
The origins of Jimma are obscure, although prior to the Oromo migrations, the territory this kingdom came to occupy had been part of the Kingdom of Kaffa. According to legend, a number of Oromo groups (variously given from five to 10) were led to Jimma by a great sorceress and Queen named Makhore, who carried a boku (usually connected with the abba boku, or headman of the Oromo Gadaa system) which when placed on the ground would cause the earth to tremble and men to fear. It is said that with this boku, she drove the Kaffa people living in the area across the Gojeb River. While this suggests that the Oromo invaders drove the original inhabitants from the area, Herbert S. Lewis notes that Oromo society was inclusionist, and the only ethnic differences they made are reflected in the history of various kinship groups.

=== Kingdom of Gumma ===
The latest kings of Gumma traced their origin to a man called Adam. Around 1770 CE, he came to live in the area, and is said to have then helped in the deposition of the last king of the previous dynasty, Sarborada. The historian Mohammed Hassen, in discussing this tradition, suggests this tradition about Adam "was invented so as to Islamize the original founder of the dynasty."

King Jawe was converted to Islam by merchants from Shewa and Begemder, and in turn he imposed his religious faith upon his subjects.

=== Sultanate of Hobyo ===
Initially, Ali Yusuf Kenadid's goal was to seize control of the neighbouring Majeerteen Sultanate, which was then ruled by his cousin Boqor Osman Mahamud. However, he was unsuccessful in this endeavour, and was eventually forced into exile in Yemen. A decade later, in the 1870s CE, Kenadid returned from the Arabian Peninsula with a band of Hadhrami musketeers and a group of devoted lieutenants. With their assistance, he managed to overpower the local Hawiye clans and establish the kingdom of Hobyo in 1878.

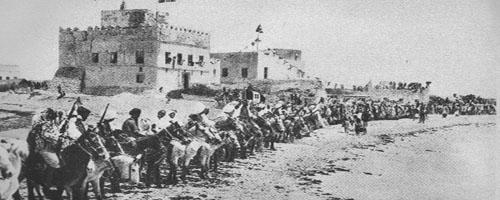
The Sultanate of Hobyo's cavalry and fort

In late 1888 CE, Sultan Kenadid entered into a treaty with the Italians, making his realm an Italian protectorate. His rival Boqor Osman would sign a similar agreement vis-a-vis his own Sultanate the following year. Both rulers had signed the protectorate treaties to advance their own expansionist objectives, with Kenadid looking to use Italy's support in his dispute with the Omani Sultan of Zanzibar over an area bordering Warsheikh, in addition to his ongoing power struggle over the Majeerteen Sultanate with Boqor Osman. In signing the agreements, the rulers also hoped to exploit the rival objectives of the European imperial powers so as to more effectively assure the continued independence of their territories.

=== Kingdom of Karagwe ===
The Karagwe kingdom was part of the many Great Lakes Kingdoms in East Africa. The kingdom reached its apex during the 19th century CE. The growth occurred during the early part of the 1800s CE with King Ndagara who came to power around 1820 CE and ruled until 1853 CE at which time he was replaced by King Rumanika.

=== Kingdom of Unyanyembe ===
Unyanyembe had a large population of the Tutsi in the 19th century CE. Although they came primarily as herdsmen, many were recruited into the army for the war against Urambo.

=== Kingdom of Urambo ===
Much of Mirambo's success came from his associations with the Watuta. This was a sub-group of Ngoni people, who were connected with Zwagendaba. With the wars in southern Africa as Shaka had expanded Zulu power, this group had been driven north, this particular sub-group settling near Bukune. Mirambo was closely associated with the Watuta's leader Mpangalala. It seems that it was from Mpangalala Mirambo learned about the age-grade military systems of southern Africa, and this led to Mirambo implementing it in his own similar system called the rugaruga. By the early 1880s CE, this military organization had about 10,000 members.

== History of Eastern African Architecture ==
Further information in the sections of Architecture of Africa:

- Ancient Eastern African Architecture
- Medieval Eastern African Architecture

== History of science and technology in East Africa ==
Further information in the sections of History of science and technology in Africa:

- Astronomy
- Metallurgy
- Medicine
- Agriculture
- Textiles
- Maritime technology
- Architecture
- Communication systems
- Commerce
- By country

== Genetic history of Eastern Africa ==
From the region of Kenya and Tanzania to South Africa, eastern Bantu-speaking Africans constitute a north to south genetic cline; additionally, from eastern Africa to toward southern Africa, evidence of genetic homogeneity is indicative of a serial founder effect and admixture events having occurred between Bantu-speaking Africans and other African populations by the time the Bantu migration had spanned into South Africa.

=== Archaic Human DNA ===
While Denisovan and Neanderthal ancestry in non-Africans outside of Africa are more certain, archaic human ancestry in Africans is less certain and is too early to be established with certainty.

=== Ancient DNA ===
==== Ethiopia ====
At Mota, in Ethiopia, an individual, estimated to date to the 5th millennium BP, carried haplogroups E1b1 and L3x2a. The individual of Mota is genetically related to groups residing near the region of Mota, and in particular, are considerably genetically related to the Ari people.

==== Kenya ====
At Jawuoyo Rockshelter, in Kisumu County, Kenya, a forager of the Later Stone Age carried haplogroups E1b1b1a1b2/E-V22 and L4b2a2c.

At Ol Kalou, in Nyandarua County, Kenya, a pastoralist of the Pastoral Neolithic carried haplogroups E1b1b1b2b2a1/E-M293 and L3d1d.

At Kokurmatakore, in Marsabit County, Kenya, a pastoralist of the Pastoral Iron Age carried haplogroups E1b1b1/E-M35 and L3a2a.

At White Rock Point, in Homa Bay County, Kenya, there were two foragers of the Later Stone Age; one carried haplogroups BT (xCT), likely B, and L2a4, and another probably carried haplogroup L0a2.

At Nyarindi Rockshelter, in Kenya, there were two individuals, dated to the Later Stone Age (3500 BP); one carried haplogroup L4b2a and another carried haplogroup E (E-M96, E-P162).

At Lukenya Hill, in Kenya, there were two individuals, dated to the Pastoral Neolithic (3500 BP); one carried haplogroups E1b1b1b2b (E-M293, E-CTS10880) and L4b2a2b, and another carried haplogroup L0f1.

At Hyrax Hill, in Kenya, an individual, dated to the Pastoral Neolithic (2300 BP), carried haplogroups E1b1b1b2b (E-M293, E-M293) and L5a1b.

At Molo Cave, in Kenya, there were two individuals, dated to the Pastoral Neolithic (1500 BP); while one had haplogroups that went undetermined, another carried haplogroups E1b1b1b2b (E-M293, E-M293) and L3h1a2a1.

At Kakapel, in Kenya, there were three individuals, one dated to the Later Stone Age (3900 BP) and two dated to the Later Iron Age (300 BP, 900 BP); one carried haplogroups CT (CT-M168, CT-M5695) and L3i1, another carried haplogroup L2a1f, and the last carried haplogroup L2a5.

At Panga ya Saidi, in Kenya, an individual, estimated to date between 496 BP and 322 BP, carried haplogroups E1b1b1b2 and L4b2a2.

===== Kilifi =====
At Kilifi, Mtwapa, in Kenya, an individual, dated between 1250 CE and 1650 CE, carried haplogroup L3b1a1a.

At Kilifi, Mtwapa, in Kenya, an individual, dated between 1250 CE and 1650 CE, carried haplogroup L0a1b2a.

At Kilifi, Mtwapa, in Kenya, an individual, dated between 1250 CE and 1650 CE, carried haplogroups J1a2a1a2d2b~ and L3e3a.

At Kilifi, Mtwapa, in Kenya, an individual, dated between 1250 CE and 1650 CE, carried haplogroup L3b1a11.

At Kilifi, Mtwapa, in Kenya, an individual, dated between 1250 CE and 1650 CE, carried haplogroup L3b1a1.

At Kilifi, Mtwapa, in Kenya, an individual, dated between 1250 CE and 1650 CE, carried haplogroups J1a2a1a2d2b~ and L0a2a1a2.

At Kilifi, Mtwapa, in Kenya, an individual, dated between 1250 CE and 1650 CE, carried haplogroups J1a2a1a2d2b~ and L2a1a.

At Kilifi, Mtwapa, in Kenya, an individual, dated between 1250 CE and 1650 CE, carried haplogroups J1a2a1a2 and L3f1b1a1.

At Kilifi, Mtwapa, in Kenya, an individual, dated between 1250 CE and 1650 CE, carried haplogroup L3b1a1a.

At Kilifi, Mtwapa, in Kenya, an individual, dated between 1250 CE and 1650 CE, carried haplogroup L0a2.

At Kilifi, Mtwapa, in Kenya, an individual, dated between 1250 CE and 1650 CE, carried haplogroup L3f1b4a1.

At Kilifi, Mtwapa, in Kenya, an individual, dated between 1250 CE and 1650 CE, carried haplogroup L3e3.

At Kilifi, Mtwapa, in Kenya, an individual, dated between 1250 CE and 1650 CE, carried haplogroup L0a2a2a1.

At Kilifi, Mtwapa, in Kenya, an individual, dated between 1250 CE and 1650 CE, carried haplogroups J and L3b1a1.

At Kilifi, Mtwapa, in Kenya, an individual, dated between 1250 CE and 1650 CE, carried haplogroup L1b1a.

At Kilifi, Mtwapa, in Kenya, an individual, dated between 1250 CE and 1650 CE, carried haplogroup L2a1f1.

At Kilifi, Mtwapa, in Kenya, an individual, dated between 1250 CE and 1650 CE, carried haplogroup L3b1a+@16124.

At Kilifi, Mtwapa, in Kenya, an individual, dated between 1200 CE and 1450 CE, carried haplogroups E1b1b and L0a2a2a.

At Kilifi, Mtwapa, in Kenya, an individual, dated between 1200 CE and 1450 CE, carried haplogroups E1b1b1b2a1a1a1a1f~ and L0a2a2a.

At Kilifi, Mtwapa, in Kenya, an individual, dated between 1200 CE and 1450 CE, carried haplogroups J1a2a1a2d2b~ and L0a2a2a.

At Kilifi, Mtwapa, in Kenya, an individual, dated between 1200 CE and 1450 CE, carried haplogroup M30d1.

At Kilifi, Mtwapa, in Kenya, an individual, dated between 1200 CE and 1450 CE, carried haplogroup L0a2a2a.

At Kilifi, Mtwapa, in Kenya, an individual, dated between 1200 CE and 1450 CE, carried haplogroup L0a1b1a.

At Kilifi, Mtwapa, in Kenya, an individual, dated between 1226 cal CE and 1297 cal CE, carried haplogroups J1a2a1a2d2b~ and M30d1.

At Kilifi, Mtwapa, in Kenya, an individual, dated between 1323 cal CE and 1423 cal CE, carried haplogroups E1b1b and L0d3.

At Kilifi, Mtwapa, in Kenya, an individual, dated between 1350 CE and 1500 CE, carried haplogroup L1c3a1b.

At Kilifi, Mtwapa, in Kenya, an individual, dated between 1400 CE and 1650 CE, carried haplogroups J1a2a1a2 and L3e3a.

At Kilifi, Mtwapa, in Kenya, an individual, dated between 1408 cal CE and 1442 cal CE, carried haplogroup L0a2a1a2.

At Kilifi, Mtwapa, in Kenya, an individual, dated between 1424 cal CE and 1457 cal CE, carried haplogroup L3a2.

At Kilifi, Mtwapa, in Kenya, an individual, dated between 1435 cal CE and 1469 cal CE, carried haplogroups J and L3d1a.

At Kilifi, Mtwapa, in Kenya, an individual, dated between 1435 cal CE and 1479 cal CE, carried haplogroups J1a2a1a2d2b~ and L0a2a2a.

At Kilifi, Mtwapa, in Kenya, an individual, dated between 1442 cal CE and 1612 cal CE, carried haplogroups J1 and L0a1b1a.

At Kilifi, Mtwapa, in Kenya, an individual, dated between 1445 cal CE and 1609 cal CE, carried haplogroups R1a1a1 and L3b1a1a.

At Kilifi, Mtwapa, in Kenya, an individual, dated between 1446 cal CE and 1611 cal CE, carried haplogroups J1a2a1a2d2b~ and L3d1a1a.

At Kilifi, Mtwapa, in Kenya, an individual, dated between 1446 cal CE and 1614 cal CE, carried haplogroups R1a1a1 and L3e1d1.

At Kilifi, Mtwapa, in Kenya, an individual, dated between 1446 cal CE and 1623 cal CE, carried haplogroups J1a2a1a2d2b~ and L1b1a.

At Kilifi, Mtwapa, in Kenya, an individual, dated between 1450 CE and 1700 CE, carried haplogroups J2a1a1a2a2b and L0a2a1a2.

At Kilifi, Mtwapa, in Kenya, an individual, dated between 1451 cal CE and 1619 cal CE, carried haplogroups J1 and L3e3a.

At Kilifi, Mtwapa, in Kenya, an individual, dated between 1454 cal CE and 1623 cal CE, carried haplogroup L3f1b1a1.

At Kilifi, Mtwapa, in Kenya, an individual, dated between 1457 cal CE and 1626 cal CE, carried haplogroup L2a1b1a.

At Kilifi, Mtwapa, in Kenya, an individual, dated between 1496 cal CE and 1630 cal CE, carried haplogroup L1c3a1b.

At Kilifi, Mtwapa, in Kenya, an individual, dated between 1497 cal CE and 1640 cal CE, carried haplogroup L2a1'2'3'4.

At Kilifi, Mtwapa, in Kenya, an individual, dated between 1508 cal CE and 1654 cal CE, carried haplogroup R0+16189.

===== Laikipia County =====
At Kisima Farm/Porcupine Cave, in Laikipia County, Kenya, there were two pastoralists of the Pastoral Neolithic; one carried haplogroups E1b1b1b2b2a1/E-M293 and M1a1, and another carried haplogroup M1a1f.

At Kisima Farm/C4, in Laikipia County, Kenya, a pastoralist of the Pastoral Iron Age, carried haplogroups E2 (xE2b)/E-M75 and L3h1a1.

At Laikipia District Burial, in Laikipia County, Kenya, a pastoralist of the Pastoral Iron Age carried haplogroup L0a1c1.

===== Lamu =====
At Lamu, Manda, in Kenya, an individual, dated between 800 CE and 1500 CE, carried haplogroup L3d1a1a.

At Lamu, Manda, in Kenya, an individual, dated between 1400 CE and 1700 CE, carried haplogroups J2 and L2d1a.

At Lamu, Manda, in Kenya, an individual, dated between 1400 CE and 1700 CE, carried haplogroup L2d1a.

At Lamu, Manda, in Kenya, an individual, dated between 1437 cal CE and 1482 cal CE, carried haplogroup L2a1b1.

At Lamu, Manda, in Kenya, an individual, dated between 1456 cal CE and 1621 cal CE, carried haplogroup L2d1a.

At Lamu, Manda, in Kenya, an individual, dated between 1456 cal CE and 1621 cal CE, carried haplogroup J2.

At Lamu, Manda, in Kenya, an individual, dated between 1457 cal CE and 1626 cal CE, carried haplogroups J2b2a2~ and L2d1a.

At Lamu, Manda, in Kenya, an individual, dated between 1485 cal CE and 1629 cal CE, carried haplogroups G2a and L3e3a.

At Lamu, Pate Island, Faza, in Kenya, an individual, dated between 1500 CE and 1700 CE, carried haplogroups E1b1a1a1a2a1a and L3e3a.

===== Nakuru County =====
At Prettejohn's Gully, in Nakuru County, Kenya, there were two pastoralists of the early pastoral period; one carried haplogroups E2 (xE2b)/E-M75 and K1a, and another carried haplogroup L3f1b.

At Cole's Burial, in Nakuru County, Kenya, a pastoralist of the Pastoral Neolithic carried haplogroups E1b1b1a1a1b1/E-CTS3282 and L3i2.

At Rigo Cave, in Nakuru County, Kenya, there were three pastoralists of the Pastoral Neolithic/Elmenteitan, one carried haplogroups E1b1b1b2b2a1/E-M293 and L3f, another carried haplogroups E1b1b1b2b2/E-V1486, likely E-M293, and probably M1a1b, and the last carried haplogroups E1b1b1b2b2a1/E-M293 and L4b2a2c.

At Naishi Rockshelter, in Nakuru County, Kenya, there two pastoralists of the Pastoral Neolithic; one carried haplogroups E1b1b1b2b/E-V1515, likely E-M293, and L3x1a, and another carried haplogroups A1b (xA1b1b2a)/A-P108 and L0a2d.

At Keringet Cave, in Nakuru County, Kenya, a pastoralist of the Pastoral Neolithic carried haplogroups A1b1b2/A-L427 and L4b2a1, and another pastoralist of the Pastoral Neolithic/Elmenteitan carried haplogroup K1a.

At Naivasha Burial Site, in Nakuru County, Kenya, there were five pastoralists of the Pastoral Neolithic; one carried haplogroup L4b2a2b, another carried haplogroups xBT, likely A, and M1a1b, another carried haplogroups E1b1b1b2b2a1/E-M293 and L3h1a1, another carried haplogroups A1b1b2b/A-M13 and L4a1, and the last carried haplogroups E1b1b1b2b2a1/E-M293 and L3x1a.

At Njoro River Cave II, in Nakuru County, Kenya, a pastoralist of the Pastoral Neolithic carried haplogroup L3h1a2a1.

At Egerton Cave, in Nakuru County, Kenya, a pastoralist of the Pastoral Neolithic/Elmenteitan carried haplogroup L0a1d.

At Ilkek Mounds, in Nakuru County, Kenya, a pastoralist of the Pastoral Iron Age carried haplogroups E2 (xE2b)/E-M75 and L0f2a.

At Deloraine Farm, in Nakuru County, Kenya, an iron metallurgist of the Iron Age carried haplogroups E1b1a1a1a1a/E-M58 and L5b1.

===== Narok County =====
At Kasiole 2, in Narok County, Kenya, a pastoralist of the Pastoral Iron Age carried haplogroups E1b1b1b2b/E-V1515, likely E-M293, and L3h1a2a1.

At Emurua Ole Polos, in Narok County, Kenya, a pastoralist of the Pastoral Iron Age carried haplogroups E1b1b1b2b2a1/E-M293 and L3h1a2a1.

===== Taita Taveta =====
At Taita Taveta, Makwasinyi, in Kenya, an individual, dated between 1650 CE and 1950 CE, carried haplogroups E1b1a1a1a2a1a and L4b2a.

At Taita Taveta, Makwasinyi, in Kenya, an individual, dated between 1650 CE and 1950 CE, carried haplogroup L3d1a1a.

At Taita Taveta, Makwasinyi, in Kenya, an individual, dated between 1650 CE and 1950 CE, carried haplogroup L3d1a1a.

At Taita Taveta, Makwasinyi, in Kenya, an individual, dated between 1650 CE and 1950 CE, carried haplogroups E1b1a1a1a2a1a3b1d1c and L1c3b1a.

At Taita Taveta, Makwasinyi, in Kenya, an individual, dated between 1650 CE and 1950 CE, carried haplogroup L3f2a1.

At Taita Taveta, Makwasinyi, in Kenya, an individual, dated between 1650 CE and 1950 CE, carried haplogroup L0f2a.

At Taita Taveta, Makwasinyi, in Kenya, an individual, dated between 1650 CE and 1950 CE, carried haplogroup L5a1a.

At Taita Taveta, Makwasinyi, in Kenya, an individual, dated between 1650 CE and 1950 CE, carried haplogroups E1b1a1a1a2a1a and L2a1+143.

At Taita Taveta, Makwasinyi, in Kenya, an individual, dated between 1650 CE and 1950 CE, carried haplogroup L0d3.

At Taita Taveta, Makwasinyi, in Kenya, an individual, dated between 1650 CE and 1950 CE, carried haplogroup L3e3a.

At Taita Taveta, Makwasinyi, in Kenya, an individual, dated between 1667 cal CE and 1843 cal CE, carried haplogroups E1b1a1a1a2a1a3b1d1c and L2a1+143.

At Taita Taveta, Makwasinyi, in Kenya, an individual, dated between 1698 cal CE and 1950 cal CE, carried haplogroup L0a1a+200.

At Taita Taveta, Makwasinyi, in Kenya, an individual, dated between 1709 cal CE and 1927 cal CE, carried haplogroups E1b1a1a1a2a1a3a1d~ and L3a2.

==== Tanzania ====
At Mlambalasi rockshelter, in Tanzania, an individual, dated between 20,345 BP and 17,025 BP, carried undetermined haplogroups.

At Kisese II rockshelter, in Tanzania, an individual, dated between 7240 BP and 6985 BP, carried haplogroups B2b1a~ and L5b2.

At Luxmanda, Tanzania, an individual, estimated to date between 3141 BP and 2890 BP, carried haplogroup L2a1.

At Kuumbi Cave, in Zanzibar, Tanzania, an individual, estimated to date between 1370 BP and 1303 BP, carried haplogroup L4b2a2c.

===== Karatu District =====
At Gishimangeda Cave, in Karatu District, Tanzania, there were eleven pastoralists of the Pastoral Neolithic; one carried haplogroups E1b1b1a1b2/E-V22 and HV1b1, another carried haplogroup L0a, another carried haplogroup L3x1, another carried haplogroup L4b2a2b, another carried haplogroups E1b1b1b2b2a1/E-M293 and L3i2, another carried haplogroup L3h1a2a1, another carried haplogroups E1b1b1b2b2/E-V1486, likely E-M293 and L0f2a1, and another carried haplogroups E1b1b1b2b2/E-V1486, likely E-M293, and T2+150; while most of the haplogroups among three pastoralists went undetermined, one was determined to carry haplogroup BT, likely B.

===== Kilwa Coast =====
At Kilwa, Coast, in Tanzania, an individual, dated between 1300 CE and 1600 CE, carried haplogroups J2a2a1a1a2a~ and L2a1h.

At Kilwa, Coast, in Tanzania, an individual, dated between 1300 CE and 1600 CE, carried haplogroup L3b1a11.

===== Lindi =====
At Lindi, in Tanzania, an individual, dated between 1511 cal CE and 1664 cal CE, carried haplogroups E1b1a1a1a2a1a3a1d~ and L0a1a2.

===== Pemba Island =====
At Makangale Cave, on Pemba Island, Tanzania, an individual, estimated to date between 1421 BP and 1307 BP, carried haplogroup L0a.

At Makangale Cave, on Pemba Island, Tanzania, an individual, estimated to date between 639 BP and 544 BP, carried haplogroup L2a1a2.

===== Songo Mnara =====
At Songo Mnara, in Tanzania, an individual, dated between 1294 cal CE and 1392 cal CE, carried haplogroups R1a and L3e3a.

At Songo Mnara, in Tanzania, an individual, dated between 1402 cal CE and 1437 cal CE, carried haplogroup L3e2b1a2.

At Songo Mnara, in Tanzania, an individual, dated between 1412 cal CE and 1446 cal CE, carried haplogroup L3d1a1a.

At Songo Mnara, in Tanzania, an individual, dated between 1418 cal CE and 1450 cal CE, carried haplogroups E1b1a1~ and L3e2b.

At Songo Mnara, in Tanzania, an individual, dated between 1508 cal CE and 1648 cal CE, carried haplogroup L3d1a1a1.

At Songo Mnara, in Tanzania, an individual, dated between 1516 cal CE and 1667 cal CE, carried haplogroups E1b1b1b2b2a1a~ and L3a1b.

At Songo Mnara, in Tanzania, an individual, dated between 1629 cal CE and 1794 cal CE, carried haplogroups E1b1b1a1a1b2~ and L3d1a1a1.

==== Uganda ====
At Munsa, in Uganda, an individual, dated to the Later Iron Age (500 BP), carried haplogroup L3b1a1.

=== Y-Chromosomal DNA ===
As of 19,000 years ago, Africans, bearing haplogroup E1b1a-V38, likely traversed across the Sahara, from east to west.

Before the East African slave trade period, East Africans, who carried haplogroup E1b1a-M2, expanded into Arabia, resulting in various rates of inheritance throughout Arabia (e.g., 2.8% Qatar, 3.2% Yemen, 5.5% United Arab Emirates, 7.4% Oman).

=== Mitochondrial DNA ===
In 150,000 BP, Africans (e.g., Central Africans, East Africans) bearing haplogroup L1 diverged. In 130,000 BP, Africans bearing haplogroup L5 diverged in East Africa. Between 130,000 BP and 75,000 BP, behavioral modernity emerged among Southern Africans and long-term interactions between the regions of Southern Africa and Eastern Africa became established. Between 75,000 BP and 60,000 BP, Africans bearing haplogroup L3 emerged in East Africa and eventually migrated into and became present in modern West Africans, Central Africans, and non-Africans. Amid the Holocene, including the Holocene Climate Optimum in 8000 BP, Africans bearing haplogroup L2 spread within West Africa and Africans bearing haplogroup L3 spread within East Africa. As the largest migration since the Out of Africa migration, migration from Sub-Saharan Africa toward the North Africa occurred, by West Africans, Central Africans, and East Africans, resulting in migrations into Europe and Asia; consequently, Sub-Saharan African mitochondrial DNA was introduced into Europe and Asia. During the early period of the Holocene, 50% of Sub-Saharan African mitochondrial DNA was introduced into North Africa by West Africans and the other 50% was introduced by East Africans. During the modern period, a greater number of West Africans introduced Sub-Saharan African mitochondrial DNA into North Africa than East Africans. Between 15,000 BP and 7000 BP, 86% of Sub-Saharan African mitochondrial DNA was introduced into Southwest Asia by East Africans, largely in the region of Arabia, which constitute 50% of Sub-Saharan African mitochondrial DNA in modern Southwest Asia. In the modern period, 68% of Sub-Saharan African mitochondrial DNA was introduced by East Africans and 22% was introduced by West Africans, which constitutes 50% of Sub-Saharan African mitochondrial DNA in modern Southwest Asia.

=== Autosomal DNA ===
Across all areas of Madagascar, the average ancestry for the Malagasy people was found to be 4% West Eurasian, 37% Austronesian, and 59% Bantu.

=== Medical DNA ===
The genomes of Africans commonly found to undergo adaptation are regulatory DNA, and many cases of adaptation found among Africans relate to diet, physiology, and evolutionary pressures from pathogens. Throughout Sub-Saharan Africa, genetic adaptation (e.g., rs334 mutation, Duffy blood group, increased rates of G6PD deficiency, sickle cell disease) to malaria has been found among Sub-Saharan Africans, which may have initially developed in 7300 BP. Sub-Saharan Africans have more than 90% of the Duffy-null genotype. In the highlands of Ethiopia, genetic adaptation (e.g., rs10803083, an SNP associated with the rate and function of hemoglobin; BHLHE41, a gene associated with circadian rhythm and hypoxia response; EGNL1, a gene strongly associated with oxygen homeostasis in mammals) to hypoxia and low atmospheric pressure has been found among the Amhara people, which may have developed within the past 5000 years. In Tanzania, genetic adaptation (e.g., greater amount of amylase genes than in African populations that consume low-starch foods) has been found in the Hadza people due to a food diet that especially includes consumption of tubers.

== Timeline of archaeological cultures and sites ==
- Middle Awash (5,700,000 BP)
- Aramis, Ethiopia (4,400,000 BP)
- Laetoli (3,460,000 BP)
- Hadar, Ethiopia (3,450,000 BP – 2, 900,000 BP)
- Dikika (3,400,000 BP)
- Lomekwi (3,300,000 BP)
- Ledi-Geraru (2,840,000 BP – 2,580,000 BP)
- Gawis cranium (2,600,000 BP)
- Lake Turkana (2,330,000 BP)
- Melka Kunture (2,000,000 BP – 1,600,000 BP)
- Olduvai Gorge (1,700,000 BP)

- Olduvai Gorge Museum

- Enkorika (Oldowan)
- Kariandusi prehistoric site (1,000,000 BP)
- Olorgesailie (740,000 BP – 600,000 BP)
- Kalambo Falls (500,000 BP – 490 BP)
- Kapthurin (285,000 BP)
- Omo Kibish Formation (196,000 BP)

- Omo remains
- Omo River

- Gademotta (183,000 BP)
- Bouri Formation (160,000 BP)
- Mousteroid (80,000 BP – 50,000 BP)
- Mumba Cave (49,000 BP)
- Kondoa Irangi Rock Paintings (47,000 BP – 4000 BP)
- Enkapune Ya Muto (40,000 BP)
- Kuumbi Cave, Zanzibar (25,000 BP)
- Nataruk (10,500 BP – 9500 BP)
- Koobi Fora (10,000 BP – 6000 BP)
- Laas Geel (10th millennia BP – 9th millennia BP)
- Chabbé (9500 BP – 8500 BP)
- Lake Turkana (7960 BP)
- Wilton culture (7630 BP – 5970 BP)
- Caves in Somaliland (4th/3rd millennium BCE)
- Gogo Falls (5800 BP – 2000 BP)
- Turkana Basin (5000 BP – 4000 BP)
- Dhambalin (5000 BP – 3000 BP)
- Savanna Pastoral Neolithic (5000 BP – 1200 BP)
- Hyrax Hill (5000 BP – 1200 BP)
- Hyrax Hill Prehistoric Site and Museum
- Ileret (4000 BP)
- Handoga (4th millennium BP)
- Asa Koma (3900 BP – 3630 BP)
- Nakfa, Eritrea (2nd millennium BCE)
- Adulis (2nd/1st millennium BCE)
- Engaruka (1930/1690 BCE)
- Kalokol Pillar Site (3800 BP)
- Elmenteitan (3000 BP – 1200 BP)
- Luxmanda (3000/2845 BP)
- Njoro River Cave (3165 BP)
- Keskese (1st millennium BCE)
- Matara, Eritrea (1st millennium BCE)
- KM2 and KM3 sites (830 BCE; 400 BCE)
- Sembel (400 BCE)
- Ngenyn (2080 BP)
- Ngamuriak (2000 BP)
- Toniki (1st century CE)
- Heis (town) (1st century CE)
- Macajilayn (1st century CE – 4th century CE)
- Kiongwe (117/350 CE)
- Black Assarca shipwreck (3rd/4th century CE)
- Dungur (550 CE – 650/700 CE)
- Mifsas Bahri (550 CE – 700 CE)
- Berenice Epideires (7th century CE)
- Kilwa Kisiwani (7th century CE)
- Kaole (7th century CE/8th century CE)
- Sirikwa culture (1200 BP – 300 BP)
- Lamu (8th century CE)
- Pate Island (8th century CE – 15th century CE)
- Jumba la Mtwana (8th century CE – 17th century CE)
- Shanga, Pate Island (8th/9th century CE)
- Munsa (900 CE – 1200 CE)
- Ras Mkumbuu Ruins (10th century CE – 14th century CE)
- Tiya (archaeological site) (10th century CE – 15th century CE)
- Ntusi (11th century CE)
- Qohaito (1st millennium CE)
- Ivuna (13th century CE)
- Ruins of Gedi (1300 CE)
- Songo Mnara (15th century CE)
- Maduna (15th century CE – 16th century CE)
- Mambrui (15th century CE – 16th century CE)
- Manda Island (16th century CE – 17th century CE)
- Bigo (15th century CE – 16th century CE)
- Amud (16th century CE)
- Takwa (16th/17th century CE)
- Bulhar (16th century CE – 19th century CE)
- Loikop people (19th century CE)
- Gaanlibah (100 BP)

Undated

- Kal-Sheikh (Undated)
- Salweyn

=== List of archaeological cultures and sites ===
- Abasa, Awdal
- Ambohimanga
- Antongona
- Armale
- Aw Garweyne
- Booco
- Boon, Awdal
- Botiala
- Damala Hagare
- Damo, Somalia
- El Ayo
- El Buh
- El Dahir
- Fiqi Aadan
- Galgala
- Goan Bogame
- Golharfo
- Gondal, Somalia
- Gondershe
- Gubyaley
- Hannassa
- Haylan
- Hingalol
- Karinhegane
- Laako
- Las Khorey
- Magosian
- Majiyohan
- Miandi
- Mudun
- Nimmo, Somalia
- Port Dunford
- Qa'ableh
- Qombo'ul
- Quljeed
- Ras Bar Balla
- Rasini
- Wargaade Wall
- Yubbe

== See also ==
- List of kingdoms in Africa throughout history#East Africa
