= Jumba =

Jumba may refer to:

- Jumba la Mtwana, a former slave port on the Indian Ocean coast of Kenya
- Jumba Jookiba, a fictional alien character from the 2002 Disney film Lilo & Stitch and its franchise
- Jumbah, a blue Boohbah in a children's television show
- KevJumba (born 1990), YouTube celebrity
