= Munsa =

Munsa is an archaeological site in Uganda, located in the south-eastern part of Bunyoro, and is commonly recognized by a rocky hill known by the locals as "Bikegete" (0°49′18.73″N 31°18′52.19″E), which is enclosed within an earthworks system of ancient ditches. The site is approximately 5 kilometres (3.1 mi) north-west of Kakumiro township in Bugangaizi County, Kakumiro District. "Munsa" is a Runyoro(Lunyoro/Runyoro Edited by Nicholas Aliganyira Nkuuna) name that means "in the trenches". The architects of the earthworks are unknown, although it has been speculated that the site can be linked to the Bachwezi. There is no evidence for this, however, and it seems likely that association of Munsa with the Bachwezi or Chwezi is a recent development.

Excavations of this site have reconstructed the late-Holocene environmental history through evidence of iron-working, human burials, food production, and earthworks. While Bikegete may have been occupied as early as the 9th century AD, radiocarbon and luminescence dates obtained during excavations indicate that the site's ditches were originally dug between the 15th and 16th centuries AD. The age of the outer ditch, Trench C, remains unknown. According to the limited archaeological evidence available, permanent settlement at Munsa was believed to have ceased around the end of the seventeenth century AD. Abandonment of Munsa may have been part of major economic, political, and social upheavals that brought about a shift in settlement patterns from permanent settlements to nomadic homesteads.

== Background ==
=== History of research ===
Investigations at Munsa began in the 1950s when Eric Lanning mapped the earthworks, collected surface artifacts, and inquired about oral traditions. Lanning noted the presence of pottery at Munsa similar in form to pottery present at the earthworks site Bigo located approximately 50 miles (80 km) to the south. He also recognized that iron artifacts were present at both sites. Based on these findings, Lanning attributed the site to a Bigo Culture. Munsa consists of settlement debris, human burials, rock-shelters, and evidence of iron working, grain storage, and the consumption of cattle. Lanning's objective was to determine the extent of the ditches and to compare them with other known earthworks in the area. Subsequent excavations have since been carried out within the site. Phases of development within Munsa have been recognised by evidence of structural changes at the centre of the earthworks.

=== Excavations ===
The first official archaeological excavations at Munsa were conducted in 1988 by Peter Robertshaw. During these investigations, units ranging from six to sixteen square metres in size, were excavated. The excavations were placed at the foot of Bikegete, with units yielding potsherds, a possible ceramic brazier fragment, bone mallets, iron artifacts, grindstones, cattle teeth, a green glass bead, and postholes from previous structures.

In 1994, Robertshaw conducted additional investigations at Munsa. Five 1 square metre (11 sq ft) test pits were excavated at Munsa during this field season, with excavations conducted on top of Bikegete and to the south of Bikegete in the cattle enclosure between Trenches A and B. Potsherds, pieces of iron, iron slag, and poorly preserved bone were recovered.

In 1995, Robertshaw returned to Munsa to conduct the first major excavations of the site. Around 230 square metres (2,500 sq ft) of the site were excavated. A series of test units was excavated across the site and included excavations within the ancient ditches, Trench A and Trench B. On top of Bikegete, a number of features were identified below the surface. These included postholes, pits (with varying contents), burials, and an iron furnace. Materials recovered during this field season included potsherds; fired clay vessels; glass beads; pipe fragments; iron artifacts such as beads, bracelets, razors, knives, spear butts, a possible hoe, and a bell; and cattle bones and teeth. Radiocarbon dates were acquired from charcoal samples recovered from Trench A and Trench B. Based in part on the results from these samples, the age of these ditches is placed between AD 1400 and 1650.

=== Environmental settings ===
The ground level at Munsa are granite intrusions, and quartzites that have become visible on the surface, forming isolated, rocky hills. Rainfall at Munsa is bimodal, with the wet periods determined by cycles over the Indian Ocean and El Niño Southern Oscillation (ENSO) episodes. Sediment cores samples were collected from a small swamp nearest each trench, and a total of 15 radiocarbon dates were obtained. Sediments consisted of darkly colored clays and fine coarse sand deposits. Subfossil pollen and spore counts were collected and analyzed along with charcoal evidence. The pollen and spores suggested a forest, and the charcoal data indicated a low probability of fire. Overall, evidence from this site suggests the presence of forest until early in the second millennium AD, followed by forest clearance approximately 1000 years ago matches the dating of the main period of occupation for Munsa.

== Discoveries ==
=== Pits ===
Variable sized circular pits were found on the Munsa A site, especially on the center and southern side of the hill. Sizes ranged from 0.75 metres to 4 metres in diameter. Some pits contained few archeological remains, but others contained one or more complete pots, sometimes associated with grinding equipment. Two pits contained human remains. A skeleton in the pit was recorded lying on its back, its head pointed in the west direction and its feet pointed east. The head was turned right, looking south, with its arms at its side and its legs having been draped across a rock. Many of the bones, including the hands and feet, were missing. Skeletons appear to have been placed with care in the put at different times. One skeleton was found with blue-green glass beads and an iron awl.

=== Burials ===
Besides the skeletons found in pits, various single burials were discovered in shallow graves. The burial positions of these individual burials differed from those observed in the pits. The head was rested in the western direction, the feet were pointed east, and the feet were in a slight flexed position. All of the skeletons discovered were those of adults or sub-adults, some of which were missing their lower incisor. Poorly preserved bones of two to three human infants were also recovered. Grave goods within the individual burials included iron and copper bracelets, along with iron beads.

=== Food production ===
Animal bones, mainly those of cattle, were recovered and analyzed along with remains of other animals. A vast number of hollow pits were found also, most likely used for the storage of grain. These pits, along with large grinding stones and pottery, are indicative of cereal agriculture.

Sediment core samples were collected from a swamp within Munsa in 2001. These sediments were found to contain ancient banana phytoliths, indicating the possible presence of cultivated bananas (and plantains) during the 4th millennium BC. Possible evidence of banana cultivation has been found in the highlands of Kuk in New Guinea dating as early as 5000 BC. If the Munsa phytolith dates are verified, they will be the earliest known cultivated bananas in Africa.

=== Iron working ===
Excavations conducted at Munsa by Robertshaw in 1995 resulted in the discovery of a 14th century iron-smelting furnace. Radiocarbon dating showed that Munsa contains the oldest currently known iron smelting remains in western Uganda. The furnace was identified on top of Bigekete Hill, and it is likely that iron smelting activities were confined to the north-western portion of the site. Excavations on Bigekite Hill uncovered iron slag, tuyère fragments, furnace lining, and numerous potsherds. Excavations also led to the findings of two furnace fills; the top furnace contained around 8 kilograms (18 lb) iron slag, which displayed flow structure, and frequent small prills of slag. Plant impressions were displayed on the surfaces of the majority of the slag. In addition to the furnaces, charcoal and several pieces of possible ore were recovered. The upper fill was a very fine and loose black layer, dominated by plant impressed fluid slag and two large slag pieces. A radiocarbon date of 615 ± 50 BP was obtained from charcoal within the lower of the two furnace fills. Dimensions and macroscopic features of a sample of tuyère fragments were recorded. No complete unbroken tuyères were noted. The tuyères varied in colour from reddish or orange-yellow to dark yellowish grey, depending on how close the fragments were to the heat of the furnace. Many tuyère fragments were vitrified, with a glassy black appearance and with purplish slag on the surface.

Of archeological interest is the furnace configuration with its use of a single tuyère. Archeologists noted that less than 0.1 kg of tuyère fragments were excavated from within the furnace an Munsa. By the 14th century, the ironworks at Munsa were important for the role they served in producing iron goods that polities of central and eastern Africa viewed as important symbolic markers of power and wealth.

=== Earthworks ===
The Munsa earthworks are the second largest in Uganda and are believed to have been created between AD 1400 and 1650. They consist of a series of ditches Bikegete Hill, a granite outcrop with rock shelters. The ditches vary in depth from 10 to 15 feet (3.0 to 4.6 m) and width from 6 to 10 feet (1.8 to 3.0 m). The innermost ditch, Trench A, surrounds Bikegete Hill. The outermost ditch, Trench C, was originally interpreted as a defense feature to protect site inhabitants from hostile invaders, but it has since been shown that the ditches would offer little protection against people wanting to gain entry into the site. Another theory that has been suggested by Robertshaw is that the outer ditch was used to prevent elephants from entering the site. The area between Trench C and the interior Trench B is large enough for plant cultivation and for livestock.

== Interpretation and significance ==
The discovery of human burials, food production, iron-working, and earthworks provide key sources of information regarding the history of the Great Lakes region. Evidence at this site also supports archaeological evidence of early cultivation of bananas while pollen cores suggest large amounts of herbivores, such as cattle. Meanwhile, the large earthwork structures would have taken thousands of person-hours to complete, likely indicating some form of social or political organisation.

The remains at Munsa also provide an unparalleled opportunity to consider iron production in the context of habitation, burials, and other broader archaeological features. Population migration in the area has often been associated with iron production. Ore would often be obtained from distant locations facilitating contact between different groups of people. It is likely that further furnaces remain undiscovered at Munsa, though further excavation and research is required.
