= Golharfo =

- Archaeological site
- Country: Somaliland
- Region: Sool
- District: Las Anod
- Time zone: UTC+3 (EAT)

Golharfo is an archaeological site in the Sool region of Somaliland.

== Overview ==
Golharfo is situated in the Las Anod District, near Gubyaley and around 15–25 km east of Hudun. The site contains rock art of animals, weaponry and household items used by earlier civilisations. Additionally, Golharfo is one of the few sites with paintings of human figures.

== See also ==
- Somalian architecture
