= Enkorika =

- Location within Kenya
- Coordinates: 1.97°S 36.92°E
- Country: Kenya
- Province: Rift Valley Province
- Time zone: UTC+3 (EAT)

Enkorika is a village and neolithic site in Kenya's Rift Valley Province. It is located in an upslope area, about 100 by 130 m. It was an Iron Age smelting site. Geologically it forms part of the Enkorika Fissure Zone.
