= Mtwapa =

- Location within Kenya
- Coordinates: 3°57′00″S 39°44′40″E
- Country: Kenya
- County: Kilifi County
- Division: Kikambala Division
- Time zone: UTC+3 (EAT)

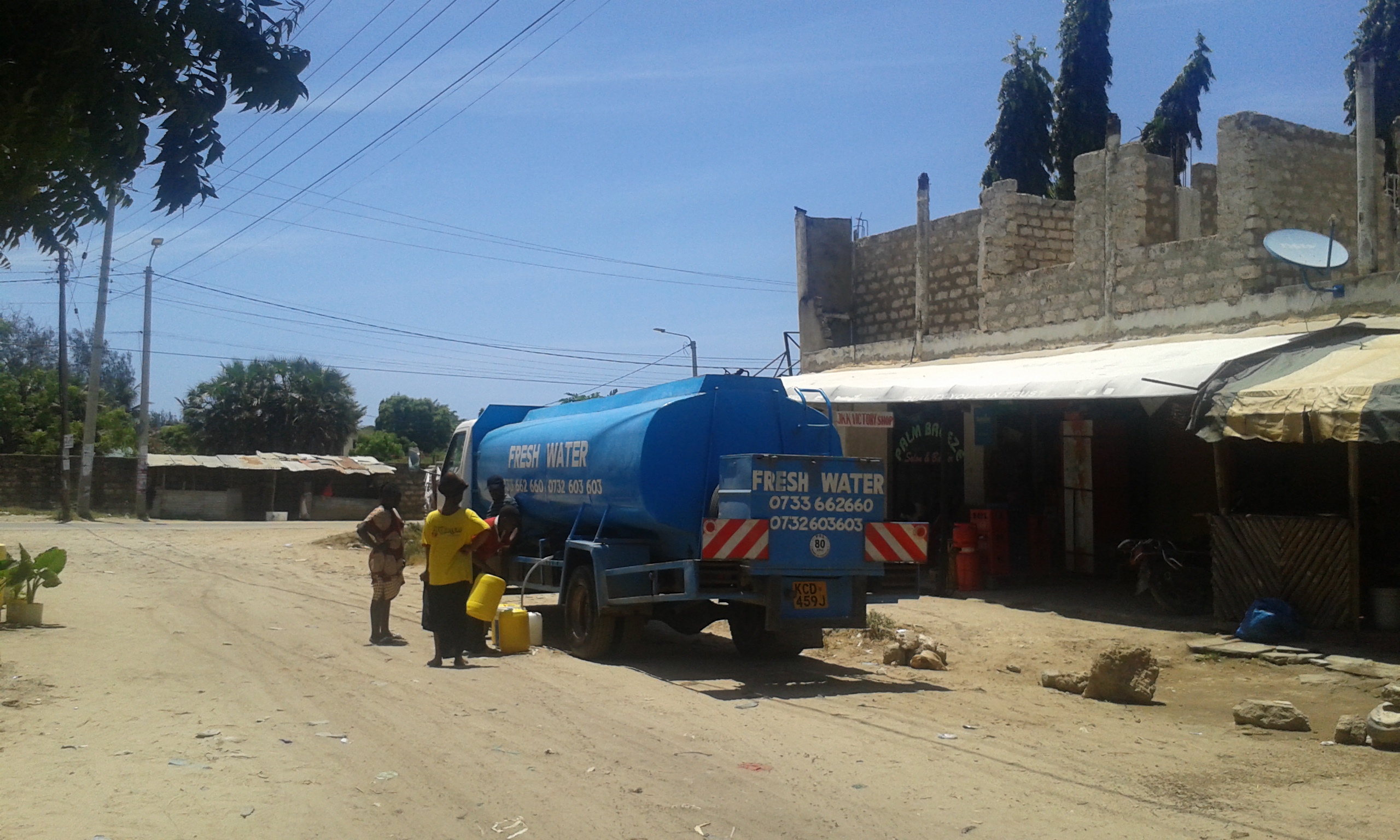
Fresh water tank vehicle (2020)

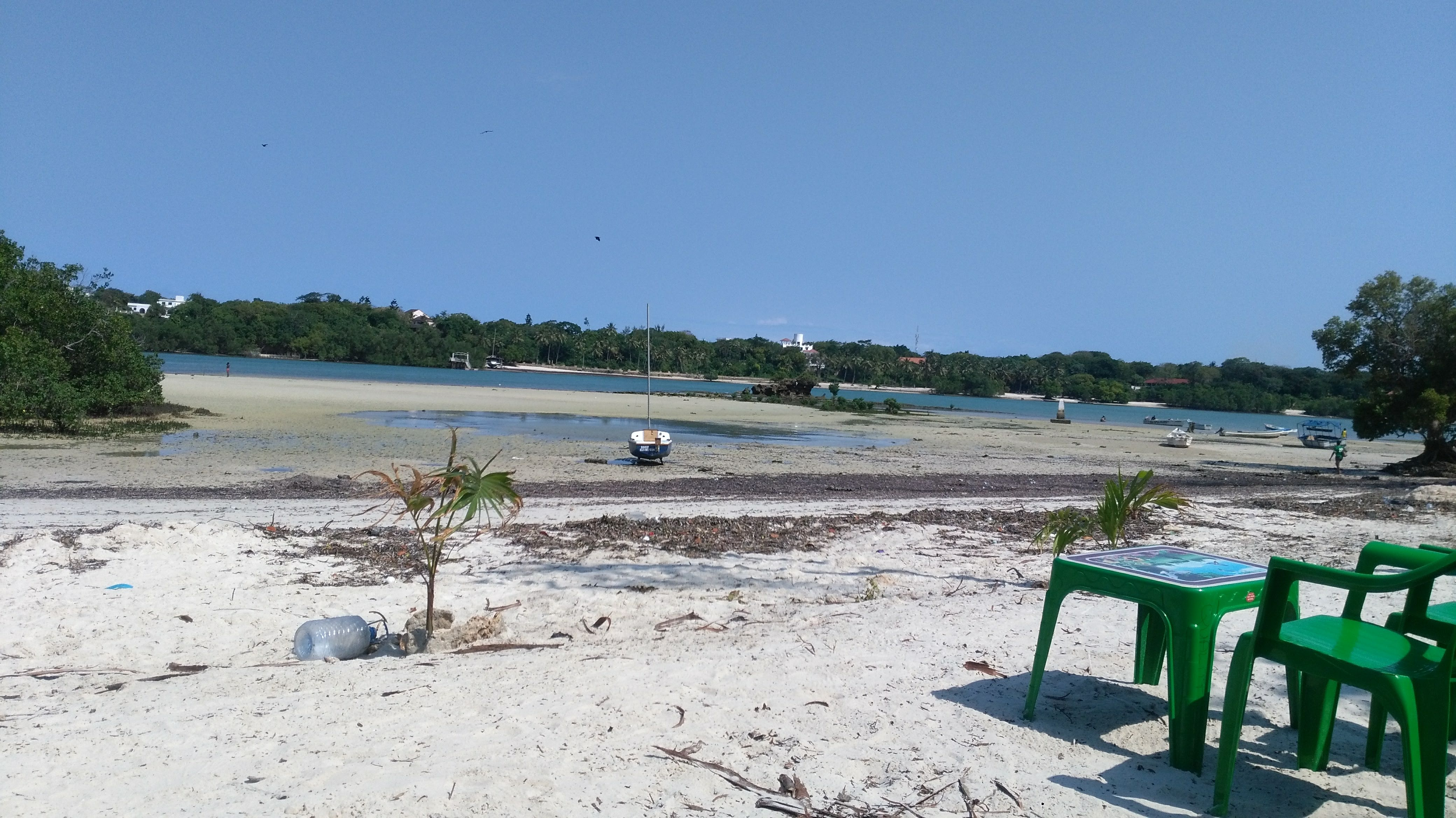
Copacabana beach at Mtwapa

Mtwapa is a town located in Kenya's Kilifi County. It is situated 16 kilometres (10 mi) north of Mombasa on the Mombasa-Malindi road. It is close to the Mombasa Marine National Park and Reserve and Jumba la Mtwana. Two informal settlements in Mtwapa, Majengo and Mzambarauni are participating in the UN-HABITAT Participatory Slum Upgrading Program. The project is run by resident committees and aims to provide every household with drinking water and a toilet.

Mtwapa is also a destination for sex tourism, including child sex tourism.

Mtwapa is a cosmopolitan town with a sizeable population of foreign residents and non-residents mostly of Caucasian origin. The town is known for its vibrant nightlife. It also hosts a large number of hospitality joints, priced fairly, ranging from lodges, hotels Air BnBs and leased apartments.

== Archaeology of Mtwapa ==
Mtwapa is an important archaeological site along the Swahili coast. First discovered by Emery in the late 19th century, Mtwapa has since been excavated to reveal 64 houses, five mosques, as well as other unidentified structures. Artifacts found at the site include pottery, iron, beads, and glass from local and long-distance trade.

DNA analysis has been completed for human remains of 39 ancient Mtwapa individuals in order to determine the proportions of "African-like, Persian-like, and Indian-like" DNA sequences. Dating from 1500 to 1700 AD, the analysis was completed of the individuals' mitochondrial DNA (mtDNA), autosomal DNA, Y chromosome DNA, and X chromosome DNA. Analysis of mtDNA in the individual, demonstrating maternal ancestry patterns, showed a L* haplotype. The L* haplotype is predominantly found in present-day Sub-Saharan African populations. Y chromosome analysis, demonstrating paternal ancestry patterns, showed that the individual was carrying the J2 haplotype, found more frequently in Southwest Asian or Persian individuals compared to Sub-Saharan African individuals. However, the gene M30d1 was found in some individuals, which is associated with South Asian populations, and the R0+16189 haplotype, which is associated with Saudi Arabian populations. However, this evidence still points to "overwhelmingly from female sources" regarding maternal ancestry. X chromosomes, containing larger maternal influence, were compared with the 22 autosomal chromosomes, which contain equal maternal and paternal influence. X chromosomes contained more indicators of African ancestry compared to autosomal DNA, further adding to evidence of African ancestry on the maternal side and Persian or Southeast Asian ancestry on the paternal side.

Introduction of foreign DNA was estimated to have occurred between 708 and 1219 AD. However, the authors indicate that this likely occurred over "multiple generations" and that mixture of Eurasian and African populations has continually occurred since

== The population of Mtwapa ==
The population growth is shown in the following table.

| Year | Population |
|---|---|
| 1999 | 18,397 |
| 2009 | 48,426 |
| 2019 | 90,677 |

== Climate ==
Mtwapa has a tropical wet and dry climate (Köppen: As). The rainiest months are April, May, June and October–November.

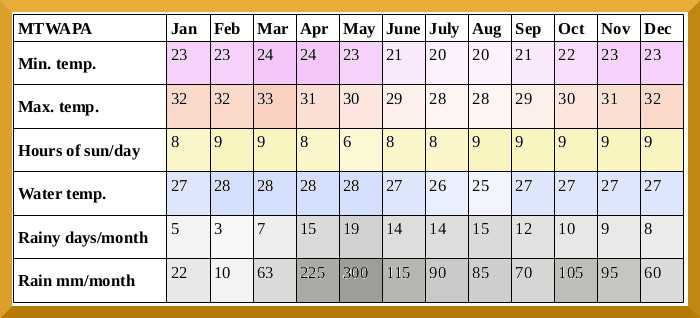

== Jumba la Mtwana ==
Jumba la Mtwana is the site of archaeological relics, lying close to the Mtwapa Creek. It dates back to the fourteenth century.

== In popular culture ==
Part of the events in the story of 2017 "Consummation in Mombasa" (by Andrei Gusev) takes place in Mtwapa. The plot describes the Catholic wedding in Mombasa of the main characters (Russian writer Andy and the girl Jennifer, who was born in Kenya) and then their life in Mtwapa.

== See also ==
- Historic Swahili Settlements
- Swahili architecture
