= Goan Bogame =

- Archaeological site
- Location in Somaliland
- Coordinates: 08°28′40″N 47°23′38″E
- Country: Somaliland
- Region: Sool
- Time zone: UTC+3 (EAT)

Goan Bogame is an archaeological site in the eastern Sool region of Somaliland.

== Overview ==
Goan Bogame is situated in the Las Anod District, near Gubyaley. It contains the ruins of a large ancient city with around two hundred buildings. The structures were built in an architectural style similar to that of the edifices in Mogadishu's old Hamar Weine and Shangani districts.

== See also ==
- Somali architecture
