= Ntusi =

Iron Age archaeological site in Uganda

Ntusi is a Late Iron Age archaeological site located in southwestern Uganda that dates from the tenth century to the fifteenth century AD. Ntusi is dominated by two large mounds and manmade scraped valley basins called, bwogero. Long abandoned by the time Hima herdsman grazed their cattle on the Bwera, the herdsman named the site "Ntusi" meaning, "the mounds", after the prominent earthworks. The archaeological record at Ntusi is unmistakable in the signs of intense occupation and activity and it represents the beginning of political complexity in this region of Africa. Bigo bya Mugenyi, another site with prominent earthworks, lies 13 km to the north of Ntusi.

== The mounds ==
The two large mounds and the bwogero are the major earthworks at Ntusi. The mounds, named the male mound (Ntusi IV) and the female mound (Ntusi III), are both approximately forty meters in diameter with a depth of deposition measuring 4 meters. Excavations at the female mound revealed the mound had been used as a refuse dump for a significant period. Excavators uncovered broken grindstones, pottery, cattle bones, carbonized sorghum seeds, and other household refuse. The surface of the mound received period burnings in order to reduce pests and foul odors of rotting refuse. Radiocarbon dates for the mound are from the eleventh to the thirteenth century AD. Local agriculture has slowly encroached on the mound and leveled off its surfaces, so much so, that on the southwestern side the mound appears rise very little.

Ntusi male mound excavations in 1988 showed that the buildup of the mound was more complicated than the 1921 Wayland and Ntusi III excavations had indicated. The excavated material remains were similar to those in the female mound, but in addition to the household debris, ornamental goods were recovered as well. The upper layers of the mound revealed carved ivory, ostrich eggshell beads, glass beads, and copper trade goods. Radiocarbon testing has dated the Male Mound to be contemporaneous with the Female Mound.

In addition to the main mounds, many smaller mounds (approximately one meter high) are found throughout the site particularly in the area north of the bwogero.

== Bwogero ==
Bwogero are wide scraped basins with surrounding upcast banks in the valley north of the male mound. Reid, who excavated the bwogero in 1991, estimated the volume of material removed in their creation at nearly 30,000 cubic meters. The valleys in and around Ntusi have high water tables and are thus damp or even marshy. Since there is no river at Ntusi, Sutton has argued that the bowgero were not designed earthworks. Rather, bwogero and the resulting upcast on the banks are a result of Ntusi residents digging down to the water table in order to bring water to the surface for their cattle to drink. Alternatively, or possibly secondarily, bwogero development may be a result of kaolin quarrying which was used as plaster.

== Geography ==
Located in the Interlacustrine region of southwestern Uganda, Ntusi is dominated by an open rolling grassland called Bwera. The site is approximately 5 km north of the equator and receives 1100 mm of rain a year which makes the region drier than the forests to Ntusi's east and west. The temperatures in this area are high but are not excessive. With its fertile soils, it has enabled the cultivation of a variety of different ranges of crops, with bananas and finger millet are most important.

Ntusi is 83 km northwest of Masaka which is west of Lake Victoria, one of the African Great Lakes. Ntusi lies along the main road that connects Mubende and Masaka. It is also 193 km away from Kampala, the capital city of the Republic of Uganda.

== Bachwezi ==
The Bachwezi, are recognized to be historical characters, heroes, and spirits. Ntusi is associated with oral traditions of the Bachwezi, thus then linked with the construct of the Chwezi Empire. The depressions of Bwogero are known as 'Wamara's bath' - an exceptionally powerful Chwezi spirit who is sometimes represented as a king. This is an example of the common tendency around the world to attribute prehistoric features of unknown date to people in recorded history, legend, or myth. Though assumed to be associated, there is no real evidence to support this.

== Research ==
Eric Lanning and Gervase Mathew investigated Ntusi Hill in the 1950s. The Ntusi female mound was excavated by Combe of the Uganda Geological Survey in 1922 and again in 1987 by the British Institute in Eastern Africa (BIEA) with the Uganda Antiquities. The Ntusi male mound was investigated by Wayland in 1921. Wayland's shaft cutting was relocated by Andrew Reid in 1988 during the BIEA campaign. Reid excavated the western side of the mound, giving researchers a profile of the center and edge of the male mound. The radiocarbon dates from Ntusi are from 1000 to 1400 AD. Archaeological results suggest increasing political, social and economic complexity. Increased competition over agricultural land is suggested by Peter Robertshaw when he tentatively recognized shifts in settlement patterns.

== Archaeological features ==
There are over 50 small sites. The slopes around Ntusi are blessed with thicker and fertile soil able to grow banana groves, sweet potatoes, maize, beans, groundnuts etc. This cultivation reveals archaeological evidence that comes to the surface like broken pots, food-bones, and grindstones. Farming threatens the archaeological features but the community at Ntusi have come up with a strategy to preserve the features as much as possible along with respecting the values of the community. Yet, the archaeological features have reduced in size. The largest archaeological features include two mounds and the bwogero basin. The mounds have suffered lowering through cultivation. The 'Ntusi male' and 'Ntusi female' are exceptionally large and are the most known. They are preserved as grass-covered eminences standing 4 meters above the surrounding fields and banana groves.

== Importance ==
Linguistic research suggests that about 1000 years ago the farming societies early on in the region were changing as cattle and bananas increased in importance. The broken pottery, grindstones, curved iron knives, and animal bones of mostly young cattle make Ntusi the most valuable archaeological site in Uganda for the time around 1000 years ago. There was also evidence for iron working coming from beads made from ostrich eggshell, fragments of ivory, traces of circular houses, glass, and cowrie-shell beads indicating contact with the Indian Ocean. This suggests that people who lived at Ntusi seem to have been herding cattle and cultivating between a cattle-keeping elite and commoners. The lack of large sites suggests that Ntusi was a chiefdom and not yet developed into a centralized state.
