= Laako =

- Town
- Location within Somaliland
- Coordinates: 10.727°N 48.589°E
- Country: Somaliland
- Region: Sanaag
- District: Las Khorey
- Time zone: UTC+3 (EAT)

Laako is a town located in the eastern Sanaag region of Somaliland. The city lies between Badhan and El Ayo.

== See also ==
- Sanaag
