= Gubyaley =

- Archaeological site
- Country: Somaliland
- Region: Sool
- District: Las Anod
- Time zone: UTC+3 (EAT)

Gubyaley is an archaeological site in the Sool region of Somaliland.

== Overview ==
Gubyaley is situated in the Las Anod District, near Goan Bogame. The site features a well with markings on its walls, which are similar to the camel brands used today by Somali herders. Beneath the various symbols are inscriptions that are believed to be associated with the markings.

== See also ==
- Somalian architecture
