= Jumba la Mtwana =

Site on the Indian Ocean coast of Kenya

Coordinates: 3.95°S 39.7667°E

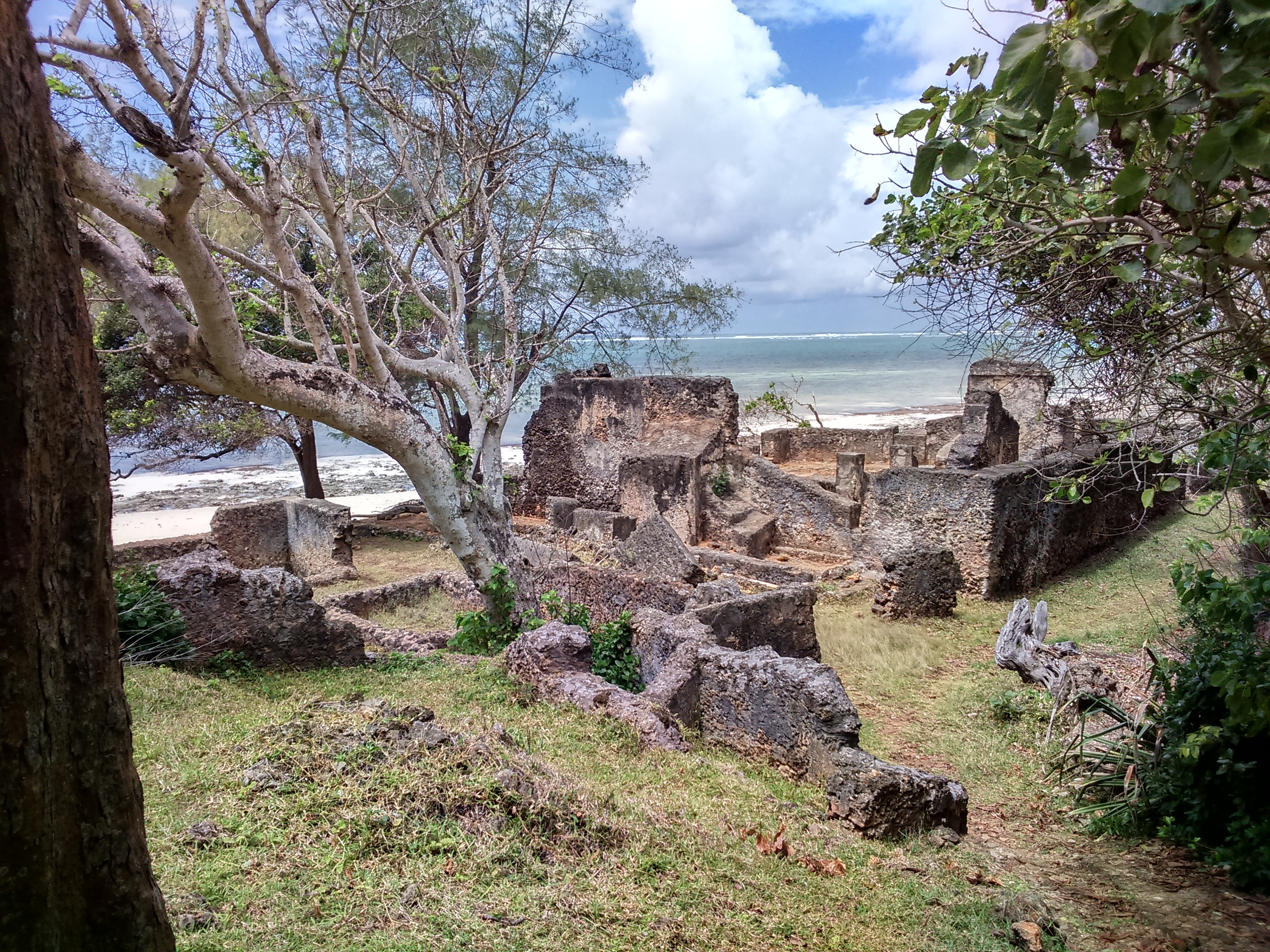
Beach mosque

Jumba la Mtwana is the site of historical structures and archaeological relics on the Indian Ocean coast of Kenya, lying close to the Mtwapa Creek, in Kilifi county, north of Mombasa. It dates back to the fourteenth century. Its features include a mosque by the sea.

== Description ==
The archaeological site includes three mosques built of coral stone, a tomb and eight houses. The territory was added to the list of national monuments of Kenya on June 4, 1982. The excavations were carried out by James Kirkman in 1972. There are no written historical records about the city, but the Chinese ceramics found make it possible to trace the dating back to the fourteenth century. The absence of later sherds suggests that this settlement was abandoned at the beginning of the fifteenth century.

The city was located close to fresh water sources and was protected from attack from the ocean. The architecture follows an Arabic style, using coral blocks.

== Peculiarities ==
The House with Many Doors is notable for its Gothic-style door. The house is divided into apartments that can accommodate several visitors. The Mosque by the Sea is the best preserved ruin. Several pools were used for ablutions, and coral stone stands for washing feet. The tomb contains a funerary stele made of coral. A passage from the Koran is carved on it, but the epitaph is illegible.

== Gallery ==
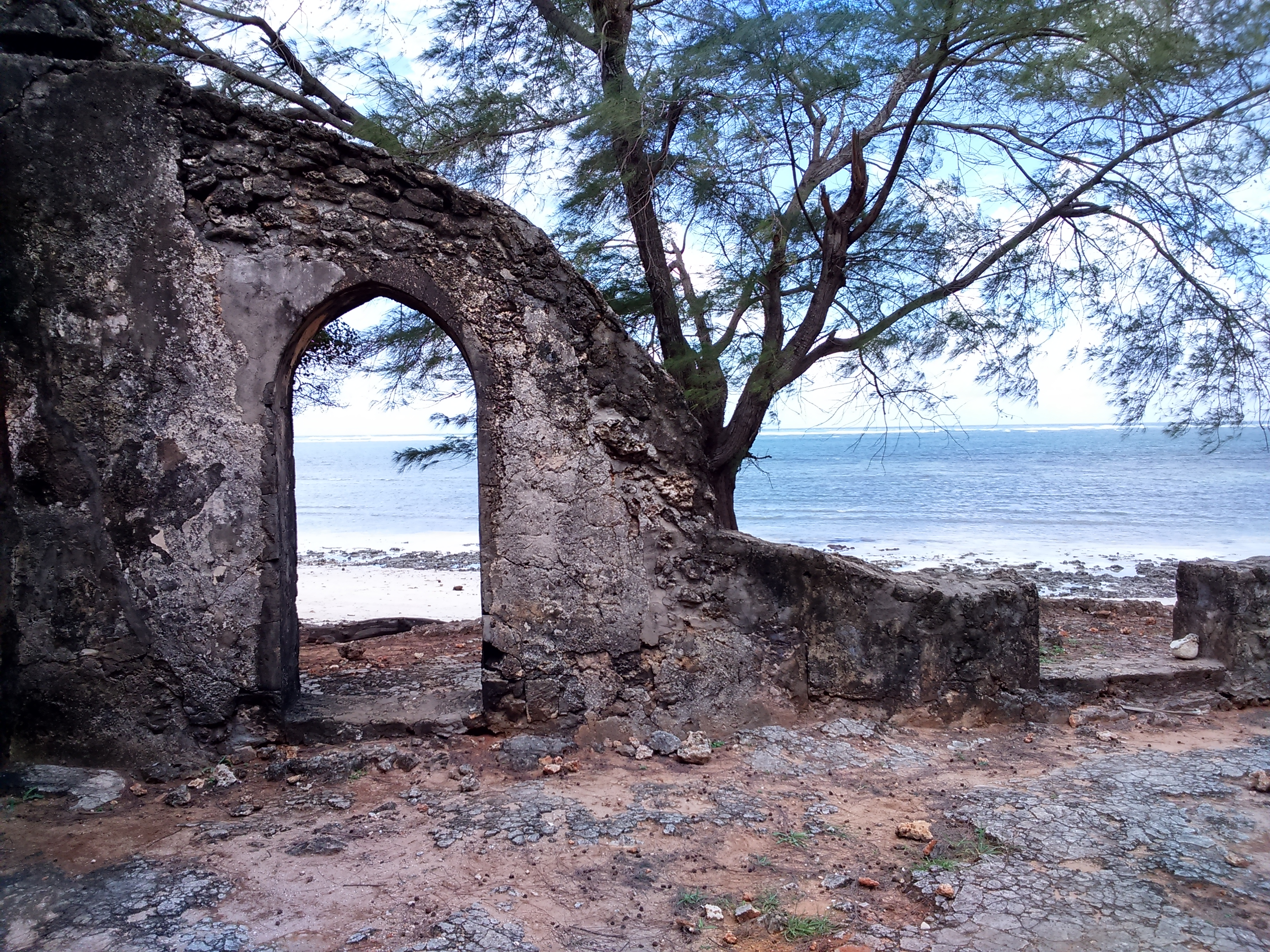
Mosque on the beach, detail

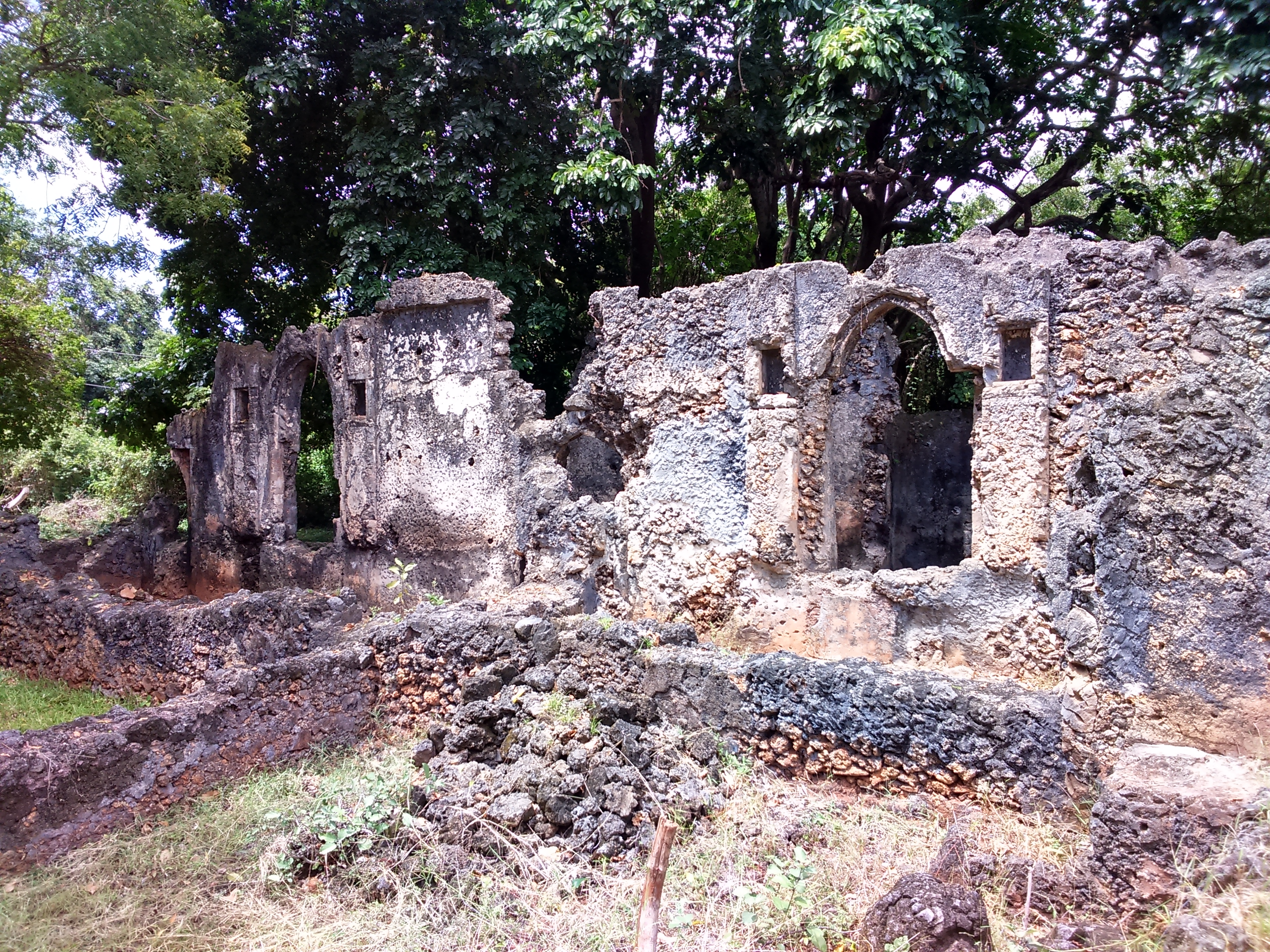
House of the many doors

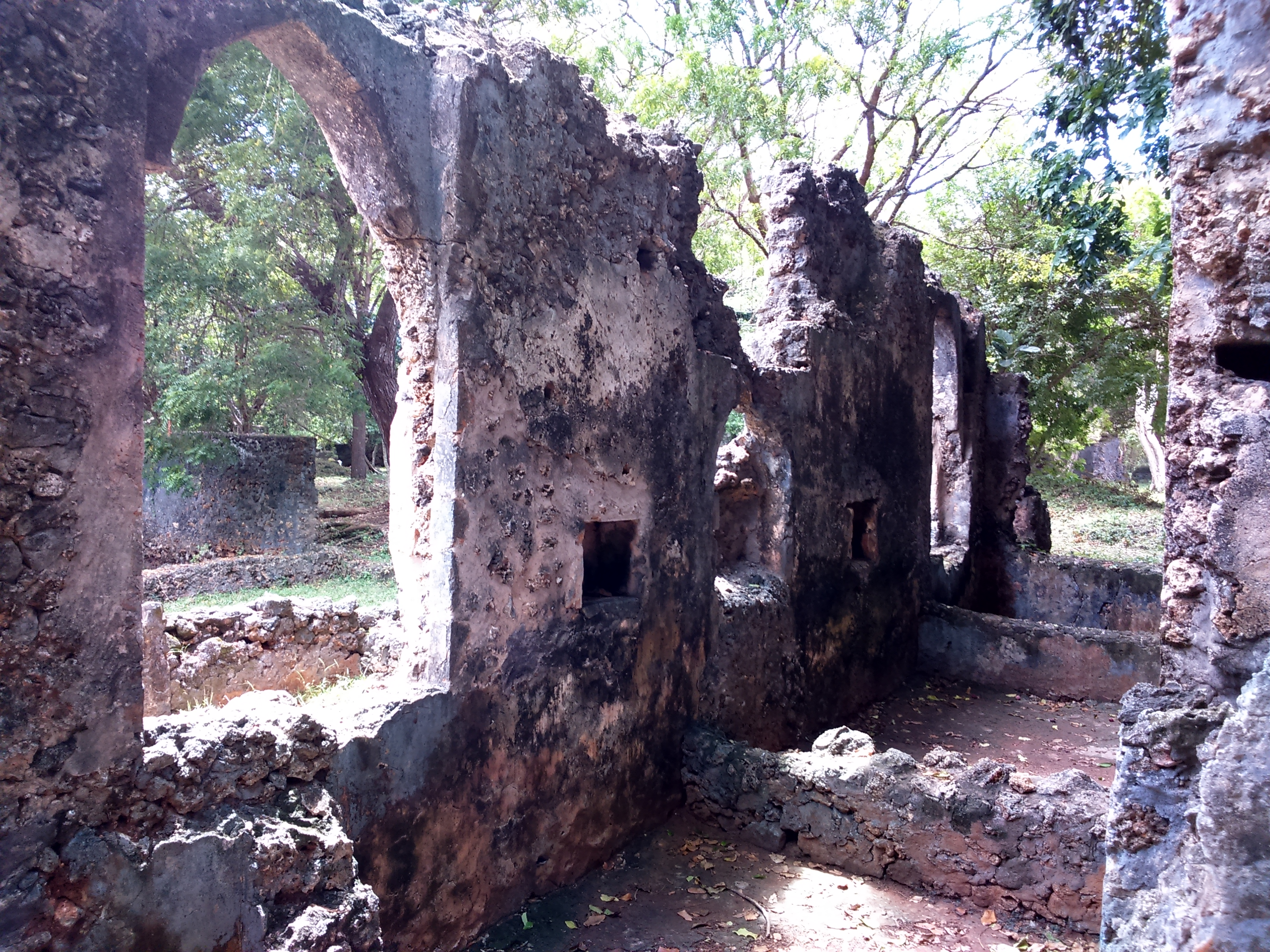
House of the many doors, detail

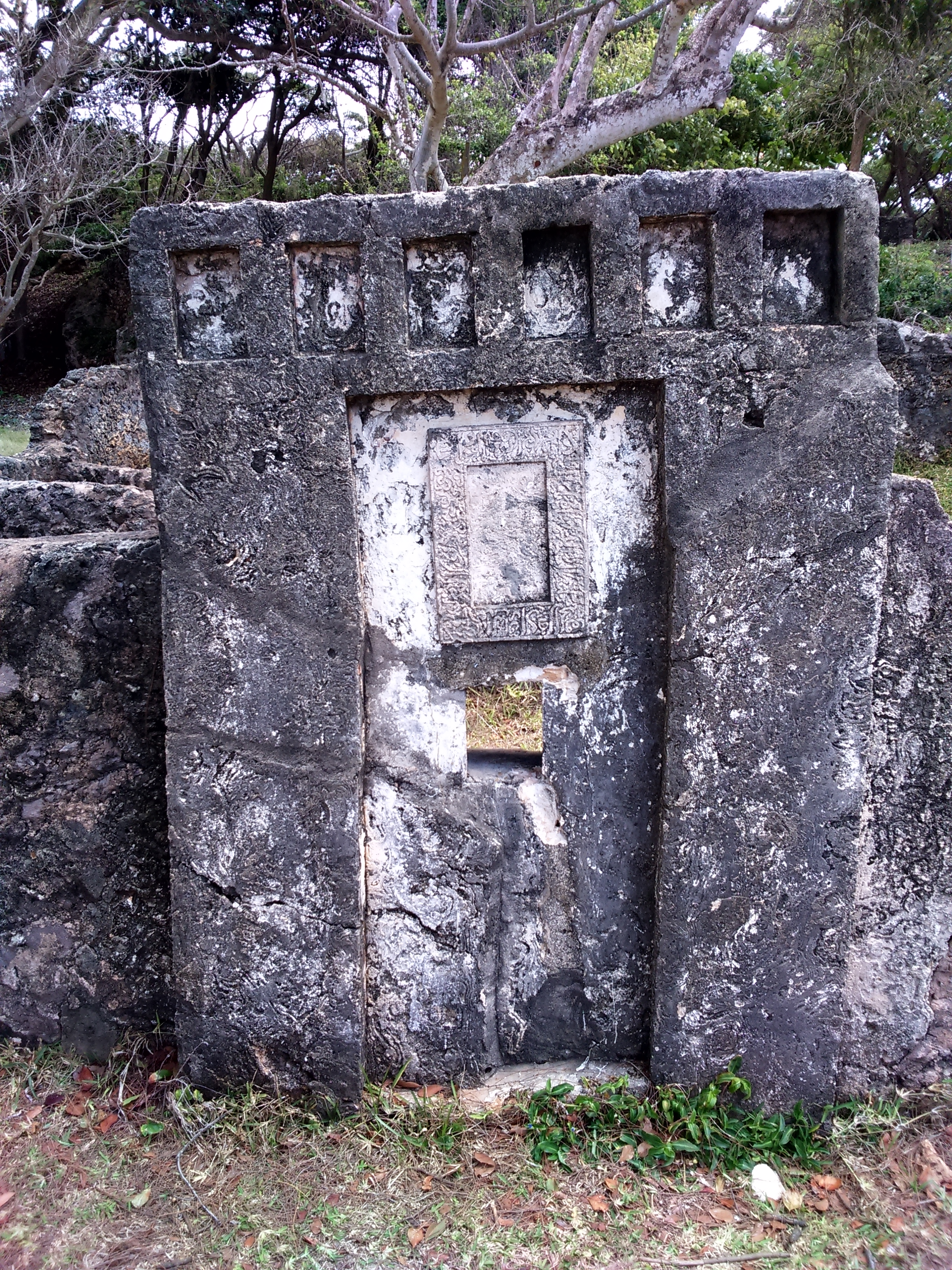
Grave

== In popular culture ==
The ruins of Jumba la Mtwana are described and repeatedly mentioned in Andrei Gusev's story "Consummation in Mombasa". The final events in the story take place in Mtwapa (located next to the ruins), where the main characters go after their wedding in Mombasa and a trip through Kenya.

== See also ==
- Historic Swahili Settlements
- Swahili architecture
