= Bigo bya Mugenyi =

Archaeological site in south-west Uganda

- Bigo
- Location in Uganda
- Type: Earthworks (ditches, banks, enclosures, mounds)
- Cultures: Late Iron Age, Great Lakes region
- Location: Southern shore of the Katonga River, Southwestern Uganda
- Region: Interlacustrine Region

History
- Built: c. AD 1300–1500

Site notes
- Length: Over 10 km (6.2 mi)
- Area: Over 300 hectares (740 acres) (outer enclosure)
- Archaeologists: P. L. Shinnie; M. Posnansky
- Condition: Ruins
- Owner: Government of Uganda

Bigo bya Mugenyi also known as just Bigo (“city”), is an extensive alignment of ditches and berms comprising ancient earthworks located in the interlacustrine region of southwestern Uganda. Situated on the southern shore of the Katonga River, Bigo is best described as having two elements. The first consists of a long, irregular ditch and bank alignment with multiple openings that effectively creates an outer boundary by connecting to the Katonga River in the east and the Kakinga swamp to the west. Toward its eastern end the outer ditch branches further to the east to encompass a nearby crossing of the Katonga River. The second element consists of a central, interconnected group of four irregularly shaped ditch and bank enclosures that are connected to the Katonga River by a single ditch. Three mounds are associated with the central enclosures; two within and one immediately to the west. When combined, the Bigo earthworks extend for more than 10 kilometers. Resulting from radiometric dates collected from archaeological investigations conducted in 1960 and additional investigations undertaken at the Mansa earthworks site in 1988, 1994, and 1995, the Bigo earthworks have been dated to roughly AD 1300-1500, and have been called Uganda's "largest and most important ancient monument."

== Investigations ==
Bigo was first documented in 1909; initially by Colonial District Commissioner D. L. Baines and then followed by Major C. R. Hall who also completed the first map of the earthworks. A more comprehensive map of the earthworks was completed for the Uganda Protectorate Geological Survey by A. D. Combe in 1921. Following this, P. L. Shinnie excavated a series of trenches at Bigo in 1957 in order to investigate the purported connections between Bigo and Bachwezi legends as well as to identify the material culture of the people who built the earthworks.

In the fall of 1960, M. Posnansky conducted further investigations at Bigo with the intent to "make as complete a survey as possible ... to establish the cultural sequence [of the site] and to obtain charcoal samples for Carbon 14 dating." During his investigation of Bigo, Posnansky spent over 7 weeks excavating more than 20 trenches (with a total volume of 781 cubic feet) at four locations (three within the main enclosure area and one at the outer ditch). From these trenches Posnansky prepared sidewall illustrations characterizing the site's soils and exposing the construction history of the mounds and ditches. Also recovered from the trenches were four charcoal samples that were submitted for radiometric dating and over 4,200 pottery sherds.

== Layout ==
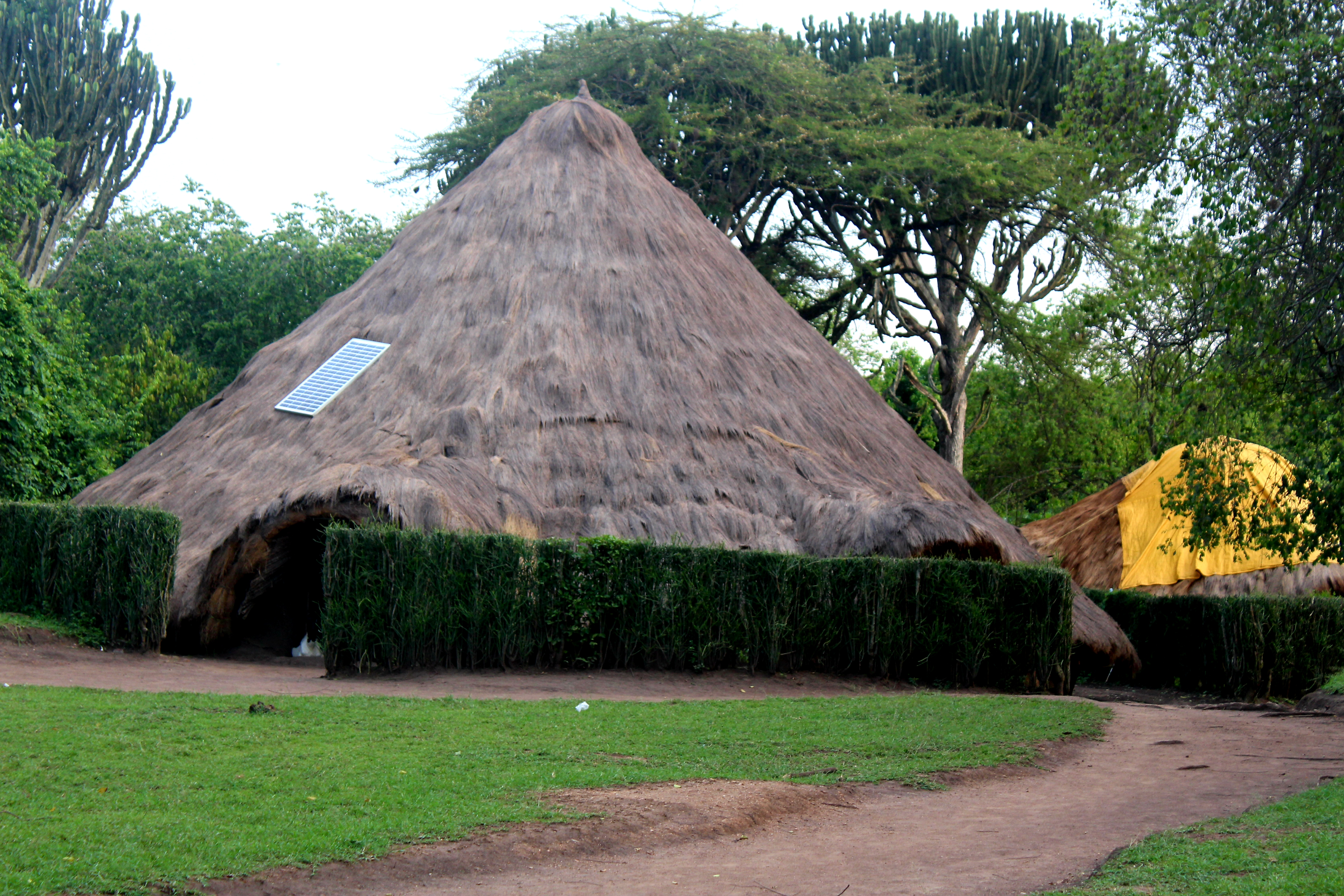
A shrine at Bigo Byamugenyi

Bigo is situated on the south shore of the Katonga River and is composed of an arcing, branched ditch and bank alignment encompassing both a smaller collection of enclosure as well as a crossing of the Katonga River.The outer ditches have a maximum width of more than 10 meters, range in depth from 1.5 to 4 meters, and altogether, contain approximately 20 breaks. Combined, the outer ditches run for more than 6 kilometers and encompass over 300 hectares with topography ranging from lowlands to a hilly area rising more than 4,000 feet.

Situated on high ground within the outer boundary are four connected enclosures (1-4). Enclosures 1 and 2 are the largest of the group and share a northwest-southeast aligned ditch having two openings and that is only partially banked on the north side. Enclosures 3 and 4 are smaller and connected to the eastern ends of 1 and 2 (respectively) with a single opening between the large and small enclosures. Enclosures 1, 2, and 4 each have two external openings, while enclosure 3 only has one external opening. When measured from the base of the ditch to the top of the adjacent bank, the inner enclosures measure from 4 to 7 meters high. Three mounds, ranging from 2 to 3 meters tall, are found within (Mounds I and II) and adjacent to Enclosure 2 (Mound III). Of note, Mound III is positioned such that the western ditch of Enclosure 2 was constructed to avoid it. The lack of an embankment for much of the ditch between Enclosures 1 and 2 suggests the upcast soil was used to create one or more of the mounds.

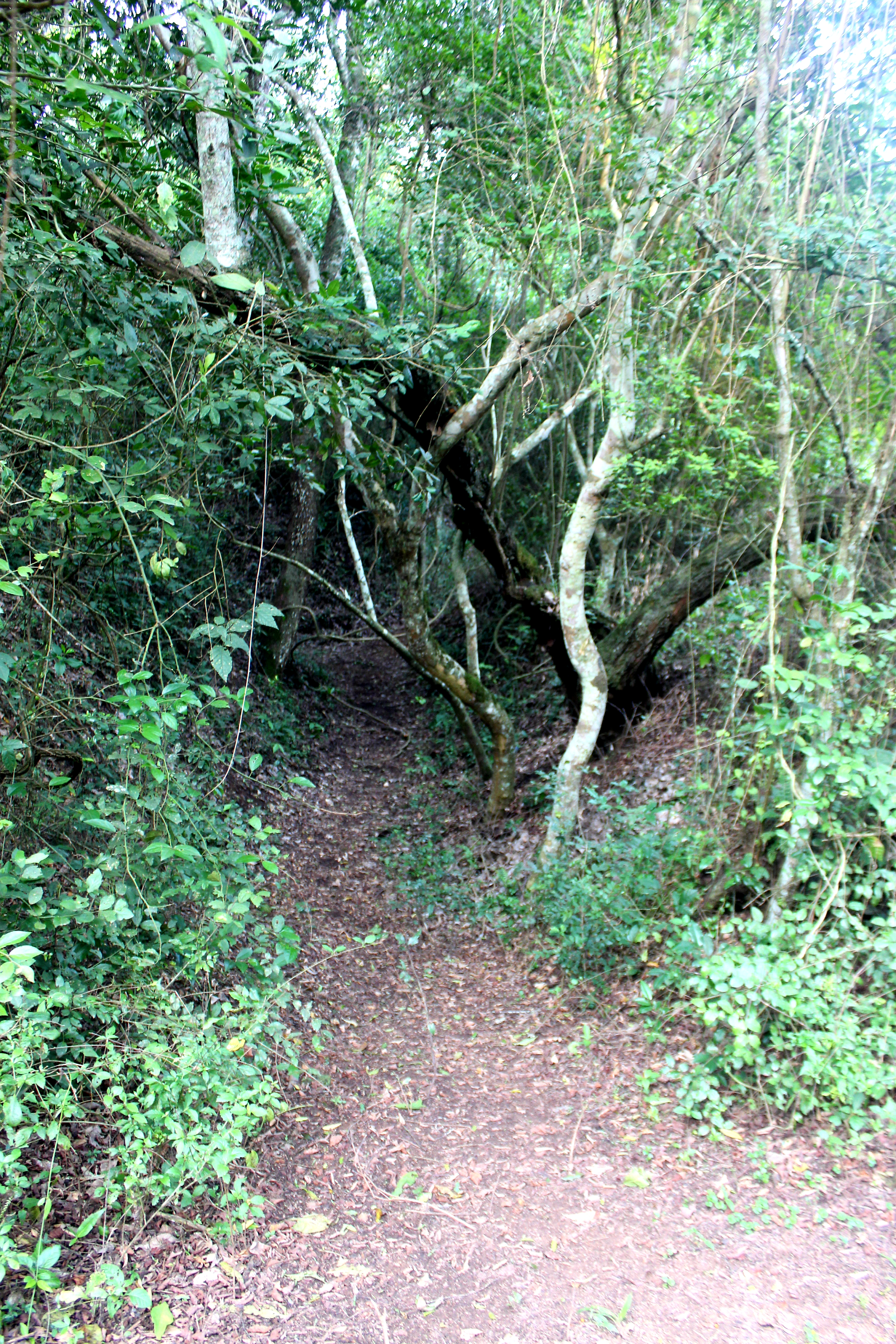
Trench created by the Bachwezi for security and transportation was 8m deep and 4 wide

A single ditch and bank originating at the northwest corner of Enclosure 2 runs in a northeasterly direction and terminates at the Katonga River. Bigo Bya mugenyi is a UNESCO world heritage site.

== Function ==
Beginning in the colonial period when they were first discovered by Europeans and continuing through to the 1960s, the Bigo earthworks have been interpreted as defensive fortifications constructed to protect from invasion; however this interpretation most likely resulted from the experiences of war stemming from the Bunyoro-Buganda conflicts of the 1800s, British forts constructed elsewhere in western Uganda, and World War I. This functional interpretation was also supported by Bunyoro oral tradition from the colonial period in which claims were made that the Bachwezi and Babito dynasties invaded the region from the north. A number of factors contradict the interpretation that the earthworks were constructed to protect from human invaders, foremost among them is the fact that the overall great length of the outer ditch system is such that it would be logistically impossible to guard. Rather than protect from human invaders, it has been suggested that Bigo's outer earthworks were constructed to keep elephants from damaging agricultural crops, while the central earthworks were constructed to protect the site's rulers from attack, while serving as places where trade goods were redistributed, as well as being demonstrations of organizational skills and having a symbolic function related to the power associated with those who lived within the earthworks.

== Artifacts ==
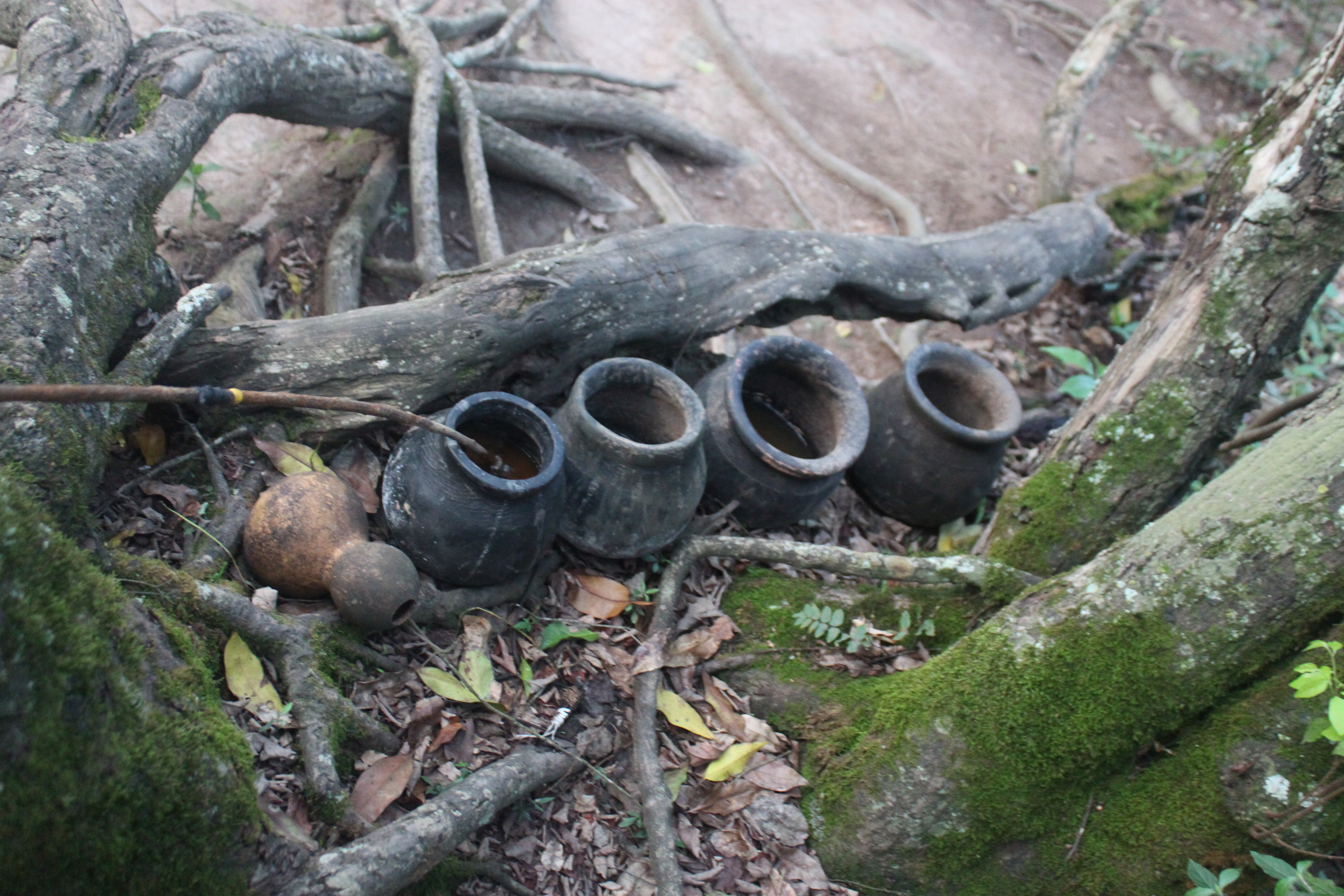
Some of the crafts at Bigo Byamugenyi in Sembabule District

The 1960 excavations at Bigo recovered more than 4,200 pottery sherds from both jars and pots, as well as six hearth kerbs, one pottery bead, and iron artifacts consisting of a tanged arrowhead, part of a bracelet, a spear ferrule, and a broken knife most likely used for reaping grain. The pottery is noteworthy for decorative styling consisting of knotted grass roulette band on or just below the rims while some vessels were also painted using a red ochre slip. The pottery vessels predominantly consisted of coarse ware with fewer examples of fine ware recovered.

== See also ==
- Kasubi Tombs
- Uganda Museum
- Uganda Martyrs Catholic Shrine Basilica Namugongo
