= Red Deer Cave people =

Prehistoric humans from 12,500 BCE in southwest China

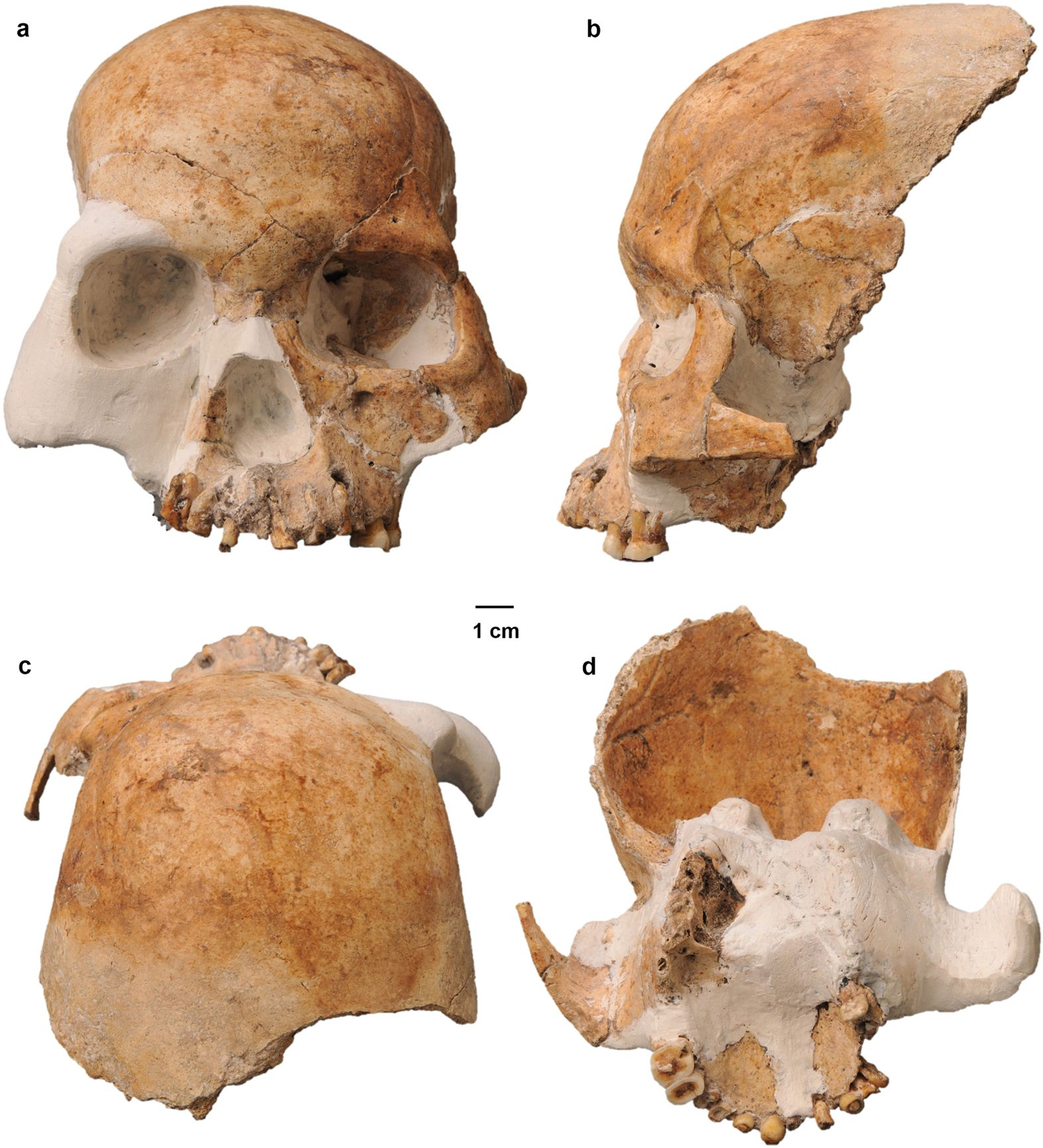
LL-1 partial skull

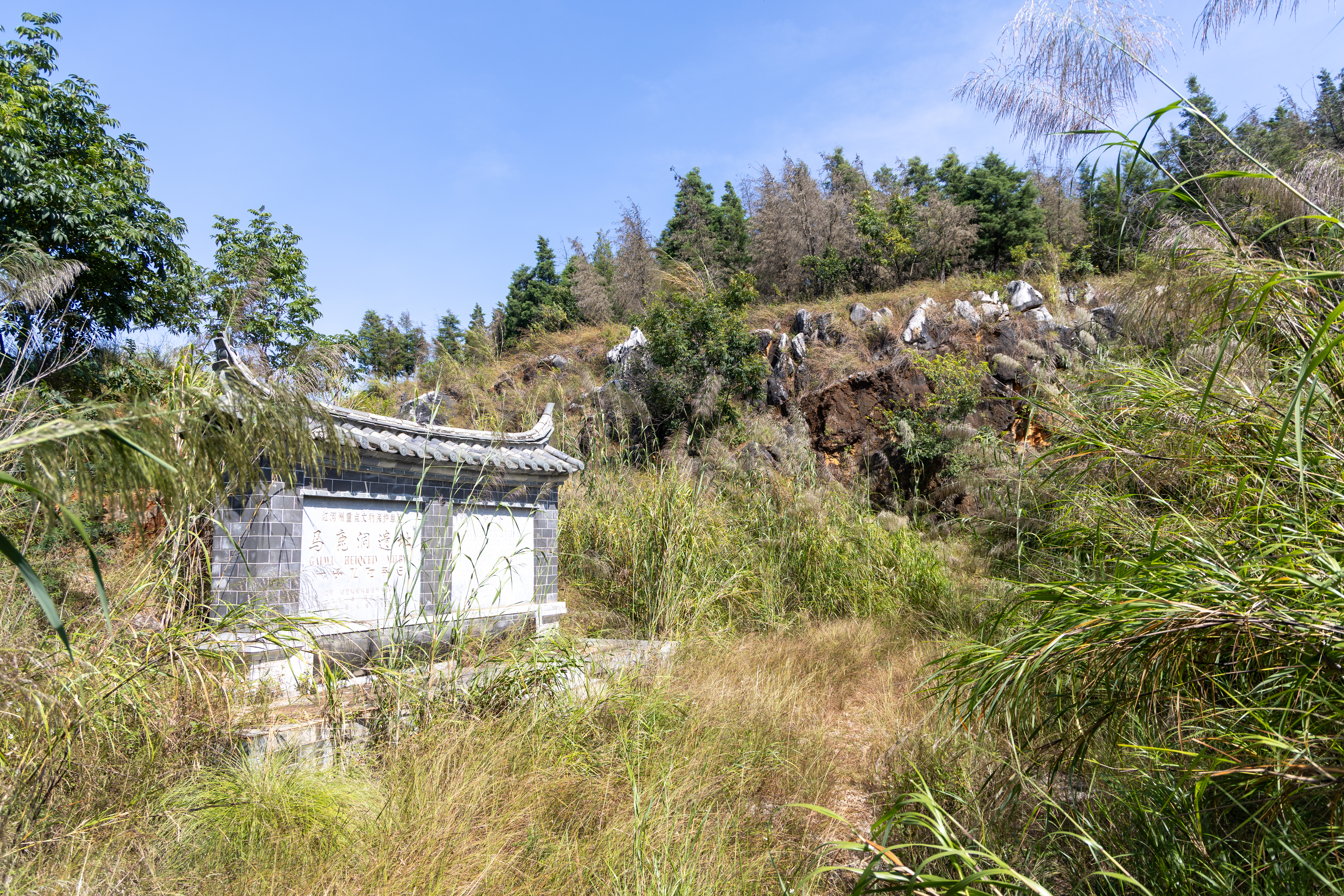
Red Deer Cave archeological site

The Red Deer Cave people were a prehistoric population of modern humans known from bones dated to between about 17,830 to c. 11,500 years ago, found in Red Deer Cave (Maludong, Chinese: 马鹿洞) and Longlin Cave in Yunnan and Guangxi Provinces, in Southwest China.

The fossils exhibit a mix of archaic and modern features and were tentatively thought to represent a late survival of an archaic human species, hybridization between Denisovan hominin and modern humans, or alternatively just "an unfortunate overinterpretation and misinterpretation of robust early modern humans, probably with affinities to modern Melanesians". A partial genome sequence by Zhang et al. in 2022 suggested that, despite their morphologically unusual features, they were modern humans related to contemporary populations in East and Southeast Asia, as well as the Americas. This DNA sequence was later brought into question, with the sequence possibly being contaminated by modern human DNA, followed up by a response in 2025 refuting this.

Evidence shows large deer were cooked in the Red Deer Cave, giving the people their name.

== Discovery and dating ==
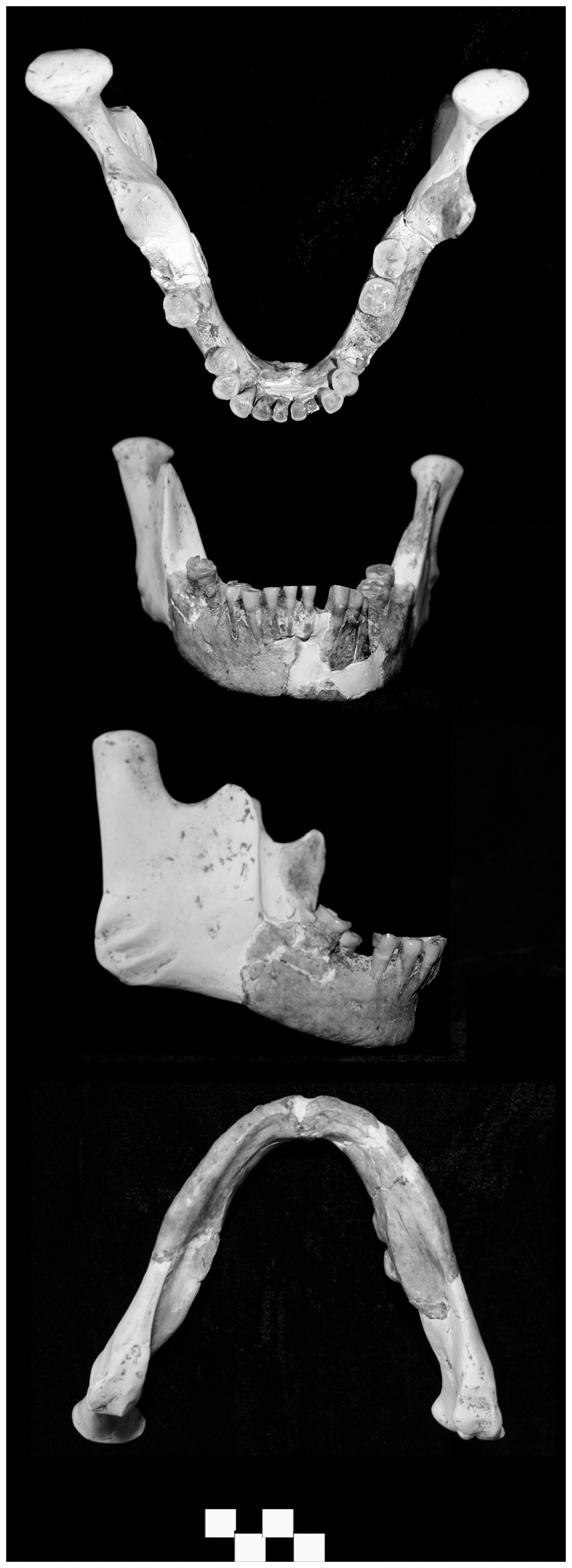
The LL-1 mandible

Locations of archaeological sites associated with Red Deer Cave people: red, Longlin (Laomaocao) Cave; blue, Maludong (Red Deer Cave)

In 1979, petroleum geologist Li Changqing discovered a block of fine-grained sediments containing human remains, animal fossils, charcoal, and burnt clay from a cave near the town of De'e, Longlin County, Guangxi Province, China. These are categorised as belonging to a single specimen, LL-1. He promptly shipped them to Kunming in the neighbouring Yunnan Province for further study, whereupon a mandible (lower jawbone) and some body bones were extracted. In 1989, the Red Deer Cave near Mengzi City, Yunnan Province, was also excavated for human remains. The significance of these finds would not be realised until Darren Curnoe, Ji Xueping, and colleagues began dating and describing existing collections of East Asian human fossils to better evaluate the poorly documented Asian archaeological record in 2008. They found the Red Deer Cave and Longlin people feature a suite of modern and archaic traits, yet lived surprisingly recently. Charcoal remnants inside the braincase were dated using uranium–thorium dating to only 17,830–13,290 years ago for various Red Deer Cave human specimens, and 11,510 years ago for LL-1. They restarted excavation of Longlin Cave in 2008, and yielded a few more human fossils, but most of the known material from the cave was recovered in the initial dig. In 2010, they were able to remove the rest of the skull and body fossils from the Red Deer Cave block.

The dating of the bones has led to confusion and division among researchers. The anatomy of the bones, prior to successful DNA testing, suggested they were archaic humans, like early Homo erectus or Homo habilis who lived around 1.5 million years ago in Africa. In 2013, Curnoe, Ji, and colleagues hypothesised that the cave people possibly represented a new species.

In 2015, Curnoe, Ji, and colleagues suggested the Red Deer Cave people represent a hybrid population between early modern humans and one or several unidentifiable native archaic species, since they bear a peculiar combination of archaic and modern features not exhibited in any other specimen. Modern humans may have entered China as early 130,000 years ago, as evidenced by the Zhirendong remains; though, owing to an unusual mosaic anatomy, the classification of such early specimens is debated. Later that year, they concluded the femur is far outside the range of variation for a modern human (that the Red Deer Cave people must be archaic). They suggested they either represent the enigmatic Denisovans—a poorly known group of late-surviving Homo which was apparently dispersed across Asia, currently only identifiable by their genetic signature—or a long-removed lineage from an incredibly early dispersal of Homo out of Africa which had not evolved a characteristically human body plan, such as that represented by the Dmanisi hominins. The latter scenario has also been proposed for H. floresiensis, which survived rather recently as well, probably due to being isolated on the island of Flores. They speculated the Red Deer Cave people persisted for a similar reason, isolated in the mountains.

== Anatomy ==
In spite of their relatively recent age, the fossils exhibit archaic human features. The Red Deer Cave dwellers had distinctive features that differ from modern humans, including: flat face, broad nose, jutting jaw with no chin, large molars, prominent brows, thick skull bones, and moderate-size brain. As with some other pre-modern humans, their body size was small, with an estimated mass of 50 kg (110 lb). Their features were also considered to be unusual within the "context of variation seen within Late Pleistocene hominin crania".

Curnoe's previous works showed the bones and teeth were remarkably similar to that of archaic humans. The height of the mandibular symphysis at 27.7 mm (1.09 in) is within the range of modern humans, and the thickness at 12.5 mm (0.49 in) the range of Neanderthals and Middle Palaeolithic modern humans. The mental foramina (a hole in the mandible) is placed rather low at 26.9 mm (1.06 in) from the base, whereas modern humans and Neanderthals are normally above 30 mm (1.2 in). The height of the first two molars and the thickness at that level is nearly identical to Upper Palaeolithic Asians, but the molars themselves are proportionally quite broad like those of Neanderthals or Middle Palaeolithic humans.

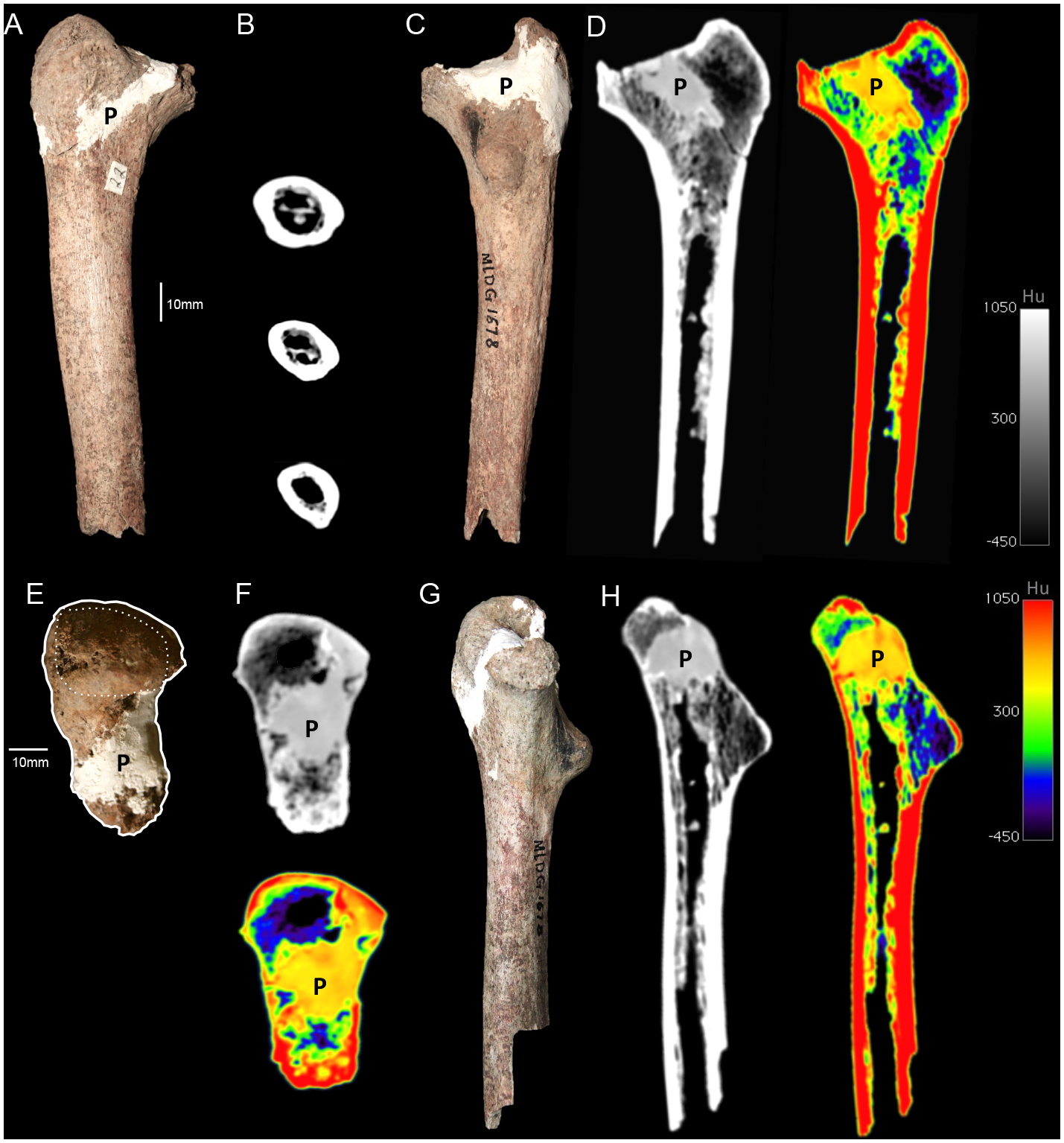
Femur from Red Deer Cave

The Red Deer Cave femur is quite archaic, retaining some traits which have been lost in all anatomically modern humans. The subtrochanteric region (just below the lesser trochanter) is circular in cross-section and has a low total and cortical bone area, reducing resistance to axial (straight down) loads. The midshaft diameter is rather narrow, which could indicate the individual was short-statured. The femur also has a moderate pilaster value index (measuring the robustness of the linea aspera), notably lower than in anatomically modern humans. In sum, the femur recalls far earlier Lower Pleistocene Homo.

The reconstruction of the Maludong femur confirmed it was very small with the outer shell, or walls, are very thin. The areas of the wall that were of high strain, and the femur neck, are relatively long; the place of muscle attachment for the primary flexor muscle of the hip (the lesser trochanter) was robust and faced strongly backward.

== Classification and archaeogenetics ==
There was much initial speculation that the Red Deer Cave people represent an archaic human lineage, though researchers proved reluctant to classify them as an otherwise unknown, or little-known, species. The remains from Red Deer Cave bear morphological similarlities to archaic hominid lineages such as Homo erectus and Homo habilis. In particular, the RDC specimen was seen as anatomically most similar in most of the characteristics to an individual known as KNM-ER 1481, a member of H. erectus, who lived 1.89 million years ago in Africa. The remains have been described as exhibiting some similarities to Australopithecus (i.e more than the genus Homo). It was also suggested that they might have resulted from mating between Denisovans and anatomically modern humans (AMH), or, alternatively that they were an AMH population with unusual physiology.

One theory suggested that the Red Deer Cave people were early humans that settled into the region more than 100,000 years ago and became isolated. The high mountains and deep valleys are ideal in isolating species geographically, so it is possible for a species to migrate to the area and become genetically isolated over time. The environment and climate of Southwest China are also unique owing to the tectonic uplift of the Qinghai-Tibetan Plateau.

The successful sequencing of ancient genomic DNA from the skull of the Red Deer Cave specimen Mengzi Ren (MZR), reported in July 2022, showed that the skull belonged to an anatomically modern human population that was genetically affiliated with Ancient Southern East Asians. The MZR specimen also displayed high affinities to modern East Asians, as well as, to a lesser extent, Indigenous peoples of the Americas, suggesting MZR-like geneflow to the ancestral Native American population prior to their isolation in Beringia. Additionally, this woman belonged to maternal haplogroup M9 - a genetic lineage that arose approximately 47,000-50,000 years ago, probably in South Asia. The geneflow and affinity between the MZR-like population in southern China and Native American populations has been questioned in a subsequent study.

The remains from the Longlin cave in Guangxi were found to belong to a different lineage dubbed as 'Longlin lineage' (also referred to as 'Guangxi ancestry'), and found to be distinct from the MZR specimen. The Longlin specimen was found to be basal to both Ancient Northern and Ancient Southern East Asian lineages, but phylogenetically closer related to them than compared to the more deeply branching East Asian lineages such as the Tianyuan, Hoabinhian, and Andamanese as well as Papuan groups. Additionally, the 'Longlin lineage' shares a closer genetic relationship with the Jōmon people, both being similarly related to northern and southern East Asian ancestries, indicating a similar separation time from the ancestral East Asian clade prior to the diversification of the widespread northern and southern East Asian lineages. The Longlin and Jōmon lineages however share different specific relationships with members of these groups. Wang et al. 2025 found that the Longlin lineage can be modeled as admixture between a Basal Asian (Xingyi_EN) lineage and a southern East Asian (Qihe3-like) lineage.

Although the 'Longlin lineage' is inferred to have not contribute ancestry to modern populations, a 9,000 year old specimen from the Dushan Cave could be modeled to have derived around 17% ancestry from the 'Longlin lineage', with the remainder ancestry being from a Fujian Neolithic like source. This type of 'Dushan ancestry' was also observed in 8,300 to 6,400 year old individuals from Mainland Southeast Asia (c. 72%) with around 28% additionally deeply branching East Asian admixture associated with the Hoabinhian cultural complex. This ancestry may be affiliated with early Austroasiatic speakers, although more recently, Austroasiatic speakers have been linked to a newly sequenced lineage (c. 7–5kya) from Central Yunnan (Xingyi_LN), which was closely related to both ancient northern and southern East Asians, but distinct from them.

== See also ==
- Mengzi Ren
- Interbreeding between archaic and modern humans
- Timeline of human evolution
- Timeline of the evolutionary history of life
