= Genetic studies on Sri Lankan Tamils =

DNA analysis of Sri Lankan Tamil populations

Although Sri Lankan Tamils are culturally and linguistically distinct, genetic studies indicate that they are closely related to other ethnic groups in the island while being related to the Indian Tamils from South India and Bengalis from East India as well. There are various studies that indicate varying degrees of connections between Sri Lankan Tamils, Sinhalese and Indian ethnic groups.

== Study by Dr. Gautam K. Kshatriya ==
According to a genetic admixture study by Dr. Gautam K. Kshatriya in 1995, the Sri Lankan Tamil are closely related to the Sinhalese who are closely related to Indian Tamils. Kshatriya found that the genetic makeup of Sri Lankan Tamils shows an overlap of about 55.2% (± 9.47%) with that of Sinhalese people while the Sinhalese had the greatest contribution from South Indian Tamils (69.86% +/- 0.61), followed by Bengalis from the East India (25.41% +/- 0.51). With both the Sri Lankan Tamils and Sinhalese in the island sharing a common gene pool of 55%. They are farthest from the indigenous Veddahs. This is also supported by a genetic distance study, which showed low differences in genetic distance between Tamils and the Sinhalese. Tamils and the Sinhalese also share similar cultures in terms of kinship classification, cousin marriage, dress and housing.

== Other studies ==
Furthermore, a study looking at genetic variation of the FUT2 gene in the Sri Lankan Tamil and Sinhalese population, found similar genetic backgrounds for both ethnic groups, with little genetic flow from other neighbouring Asian population groups. Studies have also found no significant difference with regards to blood group, blood genetic markers and single-nucleotide polymorphism between the Sri Lankan Tamils and other ethnic groups in Sri Lanka. Another study has also found "no significant genetic variation among the major ethnic groups in Sri Lanka". This is further supported by a study which found very similar frequencies of alleles MTHFR 677T, F2 20210A & F5 1691A in South Indian Tamil, Sinhalese, Sri Lankan Tamil and Moor populations.

However, another study looking at Alu polymorphism, VNTR and genetic distance have found the genetic relationship between the South Indian Tamil and Sinhalese to be much smaller than Kshatriya's findings (11–30%).

Dr Sarabjit Mastanain finding states cophenetic correlation was 0.8956 and it indicates Sinhalese & Tamil as native population. Also, it reflects on genetic distance among five populations of Sri Lanka as per given below eigenvector plot of the R-matrix.

- Genetic distance (5 populations of Sri Lanka)
  - - Burgher
  - - Malay
    - - Moor
      - - Tamil
        - Sinhalese

== See also ==
- Genetic studies on Sinhalese
- South Asian ethnic groups
- Y-DNA haplogroups by ethnic group
- Y-DNA haplogroups in populations of South Asia
- Haplogroup M30 (mtDNA)
- Haplogroup T (Y-DNA)
- Haplogroup R1a (Y-DNA)
- Haplogroup M18
