= Yacha =

Yacha may refer to these towns in China:

- Yacha, Guangxi (桠杈), in Longlin Various Nationalities Autonomous County, Guangxi
- Yacha, Hainan (牙叉), in Baisha Li Autonomous County, Hainan

== See also ==
- Yaksha: Ruthless Operations, a Korean film
