= Haplogroup M (mtDNA) =

Widespread human mitochondrial DNA grouping indicating common ancestry

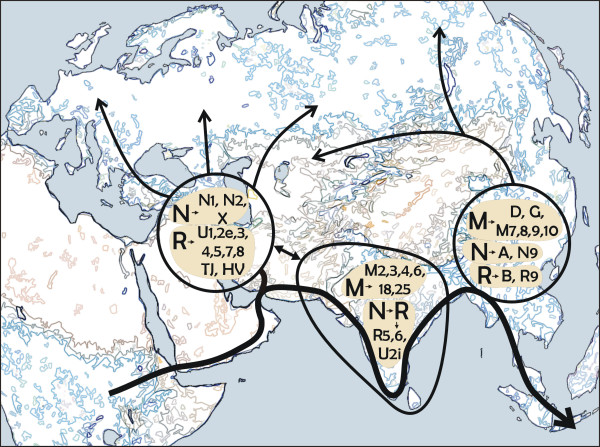
- Possible time of origin: ca. 55,000-65,000 years ago or 50,000-65,000 years ago
- Possible place of origin: South Asia, Southwest Asia, Southeast Asia, or East Africa
- Ancestor: L3
- Descendants: M1'20'51, M2, M3, M4'67, M5, M6, M7, M8, M9, M10, M11, M12'G, M13'46'61, M14, M15, M17, M19'53, M21, M22, M23'75, M24'41, M25, M26, M27, M28, M29'Q, M31, M31'56, M33, M34'57, M35, M36, M39'70, M40, M42'74, M44, M47, M48, M49, M50, M52, M55'77, M58, M59, M60, M62'68, M69, M71, M72, M73'79, M76, M81, M91, M80'D
- Defining mutations: 263, 489, 10400, 14783, 15043

Haplogroup M is a human mitochondrial DNA (mtDNA) haplogroup. An enormous haplogroup spanning all the continents, the macro-haplogroup M, like its sibling the macro-haplogroup N, is a descendant of the haplogroup L3.

All mtDNA haplogroups considered native outside of Africa are descendants of either haplogroup M or its sibling haplogroup N. Haplogroup M is relatively young, having a younger most recent common ancestor date than some subclades of haplogroup N such as haplogroup R.

== Origins ==
There is a debate concerning the geographical origins of Haplogroup M and its sibling haplogroup N. Both lineages are thought to have been the main surviving lineages involved in the out of Africa migration (or migrations) because all indigenous lineages found outside Africa belong to haplogroup M or haplogroup N. Scientists are unsure whether the mutations that define haplogroups M and N occurred in Africa before the exit from Africa or in Asia after the exit from Africa. Determining the origins of haplogroup M is further complicated by an early back-migration (from Asia to Africa) of bearers of M1.

Its date of origin in absolute terms is only known with great uncertainty, as reconstruction has yielded different (but overlapping) ranges for the age of M in South Asia and East Asia. The same authors give an estimate for t of L3 as 71.6+15.0
−14.5 kya, later (2011) narrowed to the somewhat younger 65±5 kya. Thus, haplogroup M would have emerged around 10,000 or at most 20,000 years after L3, around or somewhat after the recent out-of-Africa migration event.

=== Haplogroup M1 ===
Much discussion concerning the origins of haplogroup M has been related to its subclade haplogroup M1, which is the only variant of macro-haplogroup M found in Africa. Two possibilities were being considered as potential explanations for the presence of M1 in Africa:

1. M was present in the ancient population which later gave rise to both M1 in Africa, and M more generally found in Eurasia.
2. The presence of M1 in Africa is the result of a back-migration from Asia which occurred sometime after the Out of Africa migration.

=== Haplogroup M23 ===
In 2009, two independent publications reported a rare, deep-rooted subclade of haplogroup M, referred to as M23, that is present in Madagascar.

The origin of M23 is still not clearly understood, a west Eurasian origin had been suggested before. Haplogroup M23 is ancient and found throughout Madagascar. It is suggested to be an Asian component with significant African component. M23 was found only in one individual in Dubai

=== Asian origin hypothesis ===
According to this theory, anatomically modern humans carrying ancestral haplogroup L3 lineages were involved in the Out of Africa migration from East Africa into Asia. Somewhere in Asia, the ancestral L3 lineages gave rise to haplogroups M and N. The ancestral L3 lineages were then lost by genetic drift as they are infrequent outside Africa. The hypothesis that Asia is the origin of macrohaplogroup M is supported by the following:

1. The highest frequencies worldwide of macrohaplogroup M are observed in Asia, specifically in the Indian subcontinent, China, Japan and Korea where frequencies range from 60 to 80%. The total frequency of M subclades is even higher in some populations of Siberia or the Americas, but these small populations tend to exhibit strong genetic drift effects, and often their geographical neighbors exhibit very different frequencies.
2. Deep time depth >50,000 years of western, central, southern and eastern Indian haplogroups M2, M38, M54, M58, M33, M6, M61, M62 and the distribution of macrohaplogroup M, do not rule out the possibility of macrohaplogroup M arising in Indian population.
3. With the exception of the African specific M1, India has several M lineages that emerged directly from the root of haplogroup M.
4. Only two subclades of haplogroup M, M1 and M23, are found in Africa, whereas numerous subclades are found outside Africa (with some discussion possible only about sub-clade M1, concerning which see below).
5. Specifically concerning M1

- Haplogroup M1 has a restricted geographic distribution in Africa, being found mainly in North Africans and East Africa at low or moderate frequencies. If M had originated in Africa around, or before, the Out of Africa migration, it would be expected to have a more widespread distribution
- According to Gonzalez et al. 2007, M1 appears to have expanded relatively recently. In this study M1 had a younger coalescence age than the Asian-exclusive M lineages.
- The geographic distribution of M1 in Africa is predominantly North African/supra-equatorial and is largely confined to Afro-Asiatic speakers, which is inconsistent with the Sub-Saharan distribution of sub-clades of haplogroups L3 and L2 that have similar time depths.
- One of the basal lineages of M1 lineages has been found in Northwest Africa and in the Near East but is absent in East Africa.
- M1 is not restricted to Africa. It is relatively common in the Mediterranean, peaking in Iberia. M1 also enjoys a well-established presence in the Middle East, from the south of the Arabian Peninsula to Anatolia and from the Levant to Iran. In addition, M1 haplotypes have occasionally been observed in the Caucasus and the Trans Caucasus, and without any accompanying L lineages. M1 has also been detected in Central Asia, seemingly reaching as far as Tibet.
- The fact that the M1 sub-clade of macrohaplogroup M has a coalescence age which overlaps with that of haplogroup U6 (a Eurasian haplogroup whose presence in Africa is due to a back-migration from West Asia) and the distribution of U6 in Africa is also restricted to the same North African and Horn African populations as M1 supports the scenario that M1 and U6 were part of the same population expansion from Asia to Africa.
- The timing of the proposed migration of M1 and U6-carrying peoples from West Asia to Africa (between 40,000 and 45,000 ybp) is also supported by the fact that it coincides with changes in climatic conditions that reduced the desert areas of North Africa, thereby rendering the region more accessible to entry from the Levant. This climatic change also temporally overlaps with the peopling of Europe by populations bearing haplogroup U5, the European sister clade of haplogroup U6.

=== African origin hypothesis ===
According to this theory, haplogroups M and N arose from L3 in an East African population ancestral to eurasians that had been isolated from other African populations before the OOA event. Members of this population were involved in the out Africa migration and may have only carried M and N lineages. With the possible exception of haplogroup M1, all other M and N clades in Africa were lost due to admixture with other African populations and genetic drift.

The African origin of Haplogroup M is supported by the following arguments and evidence.

1. L3, the parent clade of haplogroup M, is found throughout Africa, but is rare outside Africa. According to Toomas Kivisild (2003), "the lack of L3 lineages other than M and N in India and among non-African mitochondria in general suggests that the earliest migration(s) of modern humans already carried these two mtDNA ancestors, via a departure route over the Horn of Africa."
2. Specifically concerning at least M1a:

This study provides evidence that M1, or its ancestor, had an Asiatic origin. The earliest M1 expansion into Africa occurred in northwestern instead of northeastern areas; this early spread reached the Iberian Peninsula even affecting the Basques. The majority of the M1a lineages found outside and inside Africa had a more recent eastern Africa origin. Both western and eastern M1 lineages participated in the Neolithic colonization of the Sahara. The striking parallelism between subclade ages and geographic distribution of M1 and its North African U6 counterpart strongly reinforces this scenario. Finally, a relevant fraction of M1a lineages present today in the European Continent and nearby islands possibly had a Jewish instead of the commonly proposed Amazigh maternal ascendance.

== Dispersal ==
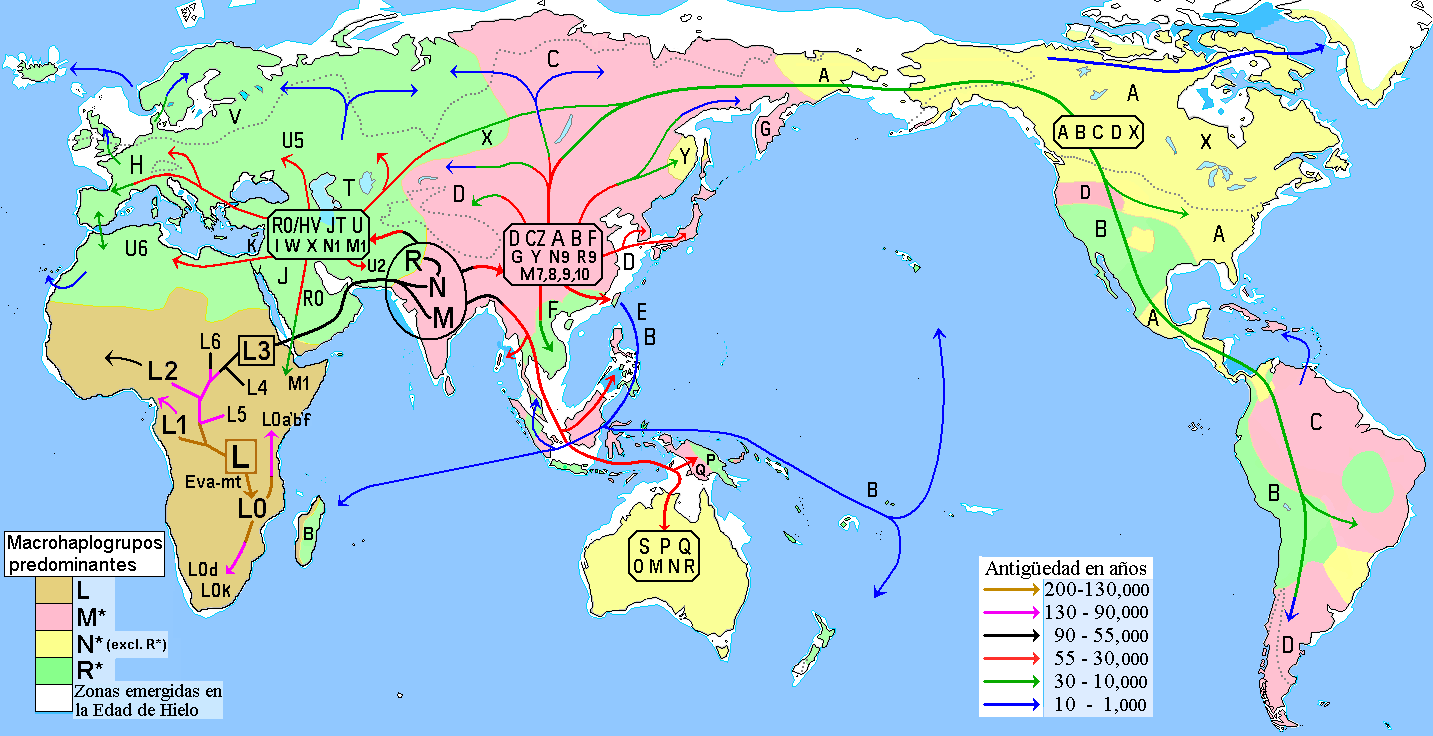
Hypothesized map of human migration based on mitochondrial DNA

A number of studies have proposed that the ancestors of modern haplogroup M dispersed from Africa through the southern route across the Horn of Africa along the coastal regions of Asia onwards to New Guinea and Australia. These studies suggested that the migrations of haplogroups M and N occurred separately with haplogroup N heading northwards from East Africa to the Levant. However, the results of numerous recent studies indicate that there was only one migration out of Africa and that haplogroups M and N were part of the same migration. This is based on the analysis of a number of relict populations along the proposed beachcombing route from Africa to Australia, all of which possessed both haplogroups N and M.

A 2008 study by Abu-Amero et al., suggests that the Arabian Peninsula may have been the main route out of Africa. However, as the region lacks of autochthonous clades of haplogroups M and N the authors suggest that the area has been a more recent receptor of human migrations than an ancient demographic expansion center along the southern coastal route as proposed under the single migration Out-of-Africa scenario of the African origin hypothesis.

== Distribution ==
M is the most common mtDNA haplogroup in Asia, super-haplogroup M is distributed all over Asia, where it represents 60% of all maternal lineages.

All Andamanese belong to Haplogroup M. It peaks in the Malaysian aboriginal Negrito tribes at almost 100% but with mtDNA M21a representing Semang; 84% in Mendriq people, Batek people 48%, (almost all belong to the specific Malaysian Negrito haplogroup M21a, this subclade also found in the Orang Asli 21%, Thais 7.8% and Malay 4.6%) It also peaks very high in Japan and Tibet, where it represents on average about 70% of the maternal lineages (160/216 = 74% Tibet, 205/282 = 73% Tōkai, 231/326 = 71% Okinawa, 148/211 = 70% Japanese, 50/72 = 69% Tibet, 150/217 = 69% Hokkaidō, 24/35 = 69% Zhongdian Tibetan, 175/256 = 68% northern Kyūshū, 38/56 = 68% Qinghai Tibetan, 16/24 = 67% Diqing Tibetan, 66/100 = 66% Miyazaki, 33/51 = 65% Ainu, 214/336 = 64% Tōhoku, 75/118 = 64% Tokyo (JPT)) and is ubiquitous in India and South Korea, where it has approximately 60% frequency. Among Chinese people both inside and outside of China, haplogroup M accounts for approximately 50% of all mtDNA on average, but the frequency varies from approximately 40% in Hans from Hunan and Fujian in southern China to approximately 60% in Shenyang, Liaoning in northeastern China.

Haplogroup M accounts for approximately 20% of island negros and 40% of manila of all mtDNA in Filipinos, among whom it is represented mainly by M7c3c and E. In Vietnam, haplogroup M has been found in 37% (52/139) to 48% (20/42) of samples of Vietnamese and in 32% (54/168) of a sample of Chams from Bình Thuận Province. Haplogroup M accounts for 43% (92/214) of all mtDNA in a sample of Laotians, with its subclade M7 (M7b, M7c, and M7e) alone accounting for a full third of all haplogroup M, or 14.5% (31/214) of the total sample.

In Oceania, A 2008 study found Haplogroup M in 42% (60/144) of a pool of samples from nine language groups in the Admiralty Islands of Papua New Guinea. M has been found in 35% (17/48) of a sample of Papua New Guinea highlanders from the Bundi area and in 28% (9/32) of a sample of Aboriginal Australians from Kalumburu in northwestern Australia. In a study published in 2015, Haplogroup M was found in 21% (18/86) of a sample of Fijians, but it was not observed in a sample of 21 Rotumans.

Haplogroup M is also relatively common in Northeast Africa, occurring especially among Somalis, Libyans and Oromos at frequencies over 20%. Toward the northwest, the lineage is found at comparable frequencies among the Tuareg in Mali and Burkina Faso; particularly the M1a2 subclade (18.42%).

Among the descendant lineages of haplogroup M are C, D, E, G, Q, and Z. Z and G are found in North Eurasian populations, C and D exists among North Eurasian and Native American populations, E is observed in Southeast Asian populations, and Q is common among Melanesian populations. The lineages M2, M3, M4, M5, M6, M18 and M25 are exclusive to South Asia, with M2 reported to be the oldest lineage on the Indian sub-continent with an age estimation of 60,000—75,000 years, and with M5 reported to be the most prevalent in historically Turco-Persian enclaves.

In 2013, four ancient specimens dated to around 2,500 BC-500 AD, which were excavated from the Tell Ashara (Terqa) and Tell Masaikh (Kar-Assurnasirpal) archaeological sites in the Euphrates Valley, were found to belong to mtDNA haplotypes associated with the M4b1, M49 and/or M61 haplogroups. Since these clades are not found among the current inhabitants of the area, they are believed to have been brought at a more remote period from east of Mesopotamia; possibly by either merchants or the founders of the ancient Terqa population.

In 2016, three Late Pleistocene European hunter-gatherers were also found to carry M lineages. Two of the specimens were from the Goyet archaeological site in Belgium and were dated to 34,000 and 35,000 years ago, respectively. The other ancient individual hailed from the La Rochette site in France, and was dated to 28,000 years ago.

Ancient DNA analysis of Iberomaurusian skeletal remains at the Taforalt site in Morocco, which have been dated to between 15,100 and 13,900 ybp, observed the M1b subclade in one of the fossils (1/7; ~14%). Ancient individuals belonging to the Late Iron Age settlement of Çemialo Sırtı in Batman, southeast Turkey were found to carry haplogroup M; specifically the M1a1 subclade (1/12; ~8.3%). Haplogroup M was also detected in ancient specimens from Southeast Anatolia (0.4%). Additionally, M1 has been observed among ancient Egyptian mummies excavated at the Abusir el-Meleq archaeological site in Middle Egypt, which date from the Pre-Ptolemaic/late New Kingdom and Roman periods. Fossils at the Early Neolithic site of Ifri n'Amr or Moussa in Morocco, which have been dated to around 5,000 BCE, have also been found to carry the M1b subclade. These ancient individuals bore an autochthonous Maghrebi genomic component that peaks among modern Berbers, indicating that they were ancestral to populations in the area. The ancient Egyptian aristocrats Nakht-Ankh and Khnum-Nakht were also found to belong to the M1a1 subclade. The half-brothers lived during the 12th Dynasty, with their tomb located at the Deir Rifeh cemetery in Middle Egypt.

=== Subgroups distribution ===
- M
  - M1'20'51
    - Haplogroup M1 – found in the Nile Valley, Horn of Africa, North Africa, Sahara, Mediterranean, and Middle East
      - M1a
        - M1a1
          - M1a1a
            - M1a1a1
          - M1a1b
            - M1a1b1
              - M1a1b1a
              - M1a1b1b
                - M1a1b1b1
              - M1a1b1c
            - M1a1b2
          - M1a1-T16093C
            - M1a1c
            - M1a1d
          - M1a1e
            - M1a1e1
            - M1a1e2
          - M1a1f
          - M1a1g
          - M1a1h
          - M1a1i
        - M1a2
          - M1a2a
          - M1a2b
        - M1a3
          - M1a3a
          - M1a3b
            - M1a3b1
            - M1a3b2
        - M1a4
          - M1a4a
        - M1a5
        - M1a6
        - M1a7
        - M1a8
          - M1a8a
      - M1b
        - M1b1
          - M1b1a
          - M1b1b
        - M1b2
          - M1b2a
          - M1b2b
          - M1b2c
    - M20 – in China, Borneo (Bidayuh), Thailand, Laos, Indonesia, Vietnam (Bahnar, H're, Jarai, Churu, Mnong, Lahu), Saudi Arabia
      - M20a - Myanmar, Thailand (Shan from Mae Hong Son Province, Tai Yuan), China, Blang, Saudi Arabia,
        - M20a1 - Thailand (Lawa from southeastern Mae Hong Son Province), Myanmar
        - M20a2 - Thailand (Phutai from Kalasin Province, Nyaw from Nakhon Phanom Province, Bru from Sakon Nakhon Province, etc.)
        - M20a3 - Madagascar, USA (New Jersey)
    - M51 – in Cambodia and Indonesia
      - M51a
        - M51a1
          - M51a1a
          - M51a1b
        - M51a2
      - M51b
        - M51b1
          - M51b1a
          - M51b1b
  - Haplogroup M2 – found in South Asia, with highest concentrations in SE India and Bangladesh; oldest haplogroup M lineage on the Indian sub-continent. Also found with low frequency in southwestern China.
    - M2a'b
      - M2a – India (Madhya Pradesh), Munda; most common in Bangladesh
        - M2a1 – Malpaharia
          - M2a1a – Uyghur, Sindhi, Hill Kolam, Thailand
            - M2a1a1 – Katkari
              - M2a1a1a – Nihal
                - M2a1a1a1 – Katkari
              - M2a1a1b – Nihal
                - M2a1a1b1 – Nihal
            - M2a1a2 – Madia
              - M2a1a2a – Madia
                - M2a1a2a1 – Kamar
                  - M2a1a2a1a – Kamar
            - M2a1a-G207A
              - M2a1a3 – Mathakur
                - M2a1a3-T16093C
                  - M2a1a3a – Kathakur, Mathakur
                    - M2a1a3a1 – Kathakur
                  - M2a1a3b – Kathakur
          - M2a1b – Dungri Bhil
          - M2a1c – Andh
        - M2a2
          - M2a2a
        - M2a3
          - M2a3a
      - M2b – Paudi Bhuiya; most common in SE India
        - M2b1 – Korku
          - M2b1a – Korku, Munda
          - M2b1b – Malpaharia
        - M2b2 – Hill Kolam, Jenu Kuruba
        - M2b3 – Betta Kurumba
          - M2b3a – Betta Kurumba
        - M2b4 – Korku
    - M2c – Myanmar, Thailand/Laos
  - Haplogroup M3 – Uyghur, Myanmar, New Delhi (Hindu), Paniya – found mainly in South Asia, with highest concentrations in west and NW India
    - M3a
      - M3a1 – Dongri Bhil, Kathodi, Katkari, Jammu and Kashmir, Pathan, Iran, Thailand/Laos
        - M3a1-T204C
          - M3a1a – Kamar of Chhattisgarh
          - M3a1b
            - M3a1b* – Sarikolis and Wakhis in Taxkorgan, Pakistan (Balochi, Makrani), India
            - M3a1b1
              - M3a1b1* – Jammu and Kashmir
              - M3a1b1a – Pakistan (Hazara)
            - M3a1b2 – Pakistan (Brahui), Iran (Persian)
      - M3a2 – Bangladesh, Jammu and Kashmir, Burusho, Qatar, Yemen
        - M3a2a – Jenu Kuruba
    - M3b – Kamar of Chhattisgarh
    - M3c – Madia, Myanmar
      - M3c-T152C!
        - M3c1
          - M3c1a – Jammu and Kashmir, Nepal (Terai Hindu, Tharu), Andhra Pradesh (tribal)
          - M3c1b – Hill Kolam
            - M3c1b1 – Saudi Arabia
              - M3c1b1a – Jenu Kuruba
              - M3c1b1b – Jenu Kuruba
      - M3c2 – Pakistan (Brahui), Jammu and Kashmir, Andh, Thailand
    - M3d – Nepal (Kathmandu), India, Italy (Salerno)
      - M3d1 – New Delhi (Hindu)
        - M3d1a – Nepal (Kathmandu), Cambodia (Lao), United Kingdom
          - M3d1a1 – Tibet (Sherpa)
  - M4'30 or M4'67
    - M4'67-T16311C!
      - Haplogroup M4 – found mainly in South Asia but some sequences in Eastern Saudi Arabia
        - Haplogroup M4a – found in Gujarat, India
        - Haplogroup M4b – found among ancient specimens in the Euphrates valley
      - Haplogroup M65
        - Haplogroup M65a – found in India, Pakistan (Balochi, Sindhi), Sarikoli in Taxkorgan, Xinjiang, China, Pamiri in Gorno-Badakhshan, Tajikistan, Ladakh, Myanmar, China
          - M65a1
          - M65a-C16311T!!
            - M65a2
        - Haplogroup M65b – found in India and in Pakistan (Balochi)
      - M67
    - Haplogroup M18'38
      - Haplogroup M18 – found among Tharus in southern Nepal and tribal people in Andhra Pradesh Haplogroup M18a was also found in Mesolithic Sri Lanka.
        - M18a
        - M18b
        - M18c
      - Haplogroup M38 – found with high frequency among Tharus from Morang District of southeastern Nepal and as singletons among Tharus from Chitwan District of south-central Nepal and Hindus from New Delhi
        - M38a
        - M38-T195C!
          - M38b
          - M38c
        - M38-T199C
          - M38d
          - M38e
    - Haplogroup M30 – mainly in India; also found in Nepal, Pakistan, Central Asia (Kyrgyz, Wakhi, and Sarikoli in Taxkorgan, Xinjiang, China and Tajiks in Dushanbe, Tajikistan), the Middle East, and North Africa.
      - M30a
        - M30a1
        - M30a2
      - M30b
      - M30c
        - M30c1
          - M30c1a
            - M30c1a1
      - M30d
        - M30d1
        - M30d2
      - M30-C16234T
        - M30e
      - M30f
      - M30g
    - Haplogroup M37
      - M37-T152C!
        - M37-T152C!-C151T
          - Haplogroup M37a – found in Gujarat, India
            - M37a1
          - M37d
      - M37e
        - M37e2
    - M43
      - M43-T16311C!
        - M43a
          - M43a1
      - M43b
    - M45
      - M45a
    - M54
    - M63
    - M64
    - M66
      - M66a
      - M66b
- Haplogroup M5 – found in South Asia
  - Haplogroup M5a – found in India (Jammu and Kashmir, Madhya Pradesh, Kathakur, Gadaba), Thailand (Mon in Ratchaburi Province and Lopburi Province), Israel, Kyrgyz in Taxkorgan
    - M5a1
      - M5a1a – India (incl. Jammu and Kashmir)
      - M5a1b – India (Jammu and Kashmir, Dongri Bhil, Nihal, Andh), Pakistan (Burusho), Russia, Spain (Romani), USA (Georgia), USA (California)
    - M5a2 – India
      - M5a2a – Pakistan (Balochi), India (Nihal), Thailand (Tai Yuan in Uttaradit Province)
        - M5a2a1 – India (Hindus in New Delhi), Pakistan (Sindhi)
          - M5a2a1a – Saudi Arabia, Iran (Persian), Kazakh, Pakistan (Balochi), India (Dongri Bhil, Korku, Lachungpa), Myanmar
        - M5a2a2 – India (Kamar of Chhattisgarh), Yemen
        - M5a2a3 – India (Pauri Bhuiya, Munda)
        - M5a2a4 – Iran (Persians), Pakistan (Brahui, Makrani, Balochi)
    - M5a3
      - M5a3a – India (Kamar of Chhattisgarh)
      - M5a3b – India (Dongri Bhil, Kathodi)
    - M5a4 – India (Kathodi, Korku)
    - M5a5 – India (Dongri Bhil, Andh), Yemen
  - Haplogroup M5b – found in India and Thailand (Khon Mueang in Chiang Mai Province)
    - Haplogroup M5b2b1a – found in Tibet, Ladakh, Nepal
  - Haplogroup M5c – found in India, Thailand (Mon in Lopburi Province and Nakhon Ratchasima Province), Tibet, Nepal
    - Haplogroup M5c1 – India (Pauri Bhuiya, Kathodi, etc.), Thailand (Thai from Phichit Province)
    - Haplogroup M5c2 – Nepal (Tharu), Tibet (Sherpa), Thailand (Mon from Nakhon Ratchasima Province)
- Haplogroup M6 – found mainly in South Asia, with highest concentrations in mid-eastern India and Kashmir
  - Haplogroup M6b – found in Kerala, India
  - Haplogroup M61 – found among ancient specimens in the Euphrates valley
- Haplogroup M7 – found in East Asia and Southeast Asia, especially in Japan, southern China, Vietnam, Laos, and Thailand; also found with low frequency in Central Asia and Siberia
  - Haplogroup M7a
    - Haplogroup M7a* – Japan
    - Haplogroup M7a1
      - Haplogroup M7a1* – Japan, Jiangsu, Shandong
      - Haplogroup M7a1a
        - Haplogroup M7a1a* – Japan, Korea, Beijing, Hebei, Henan, Sichuan, Shanghai, Shandong
        - Haplogroup M7a1a1
          - Haplogroup M7a1a1* – Japan, Korea, Jiangsu, Shandong, Liaoning, Henan
          - Haplogroup M7a1a1a – Japan
        - Haplogroup M7a1a2
          - Haplogroup M7a1a2* – Japan, Jiangsu
          - Haplogroup M7a1a2a – Japan
        - Haplogroup M7a1a3 – Japan
        - Haplogroup M7a1a4
          - Haplogroup M7a1a4* – Japan, Zhejiang
          - Haplogroup M7a1a4a – Japan
        - Haplogroup M7a1a5
          - Haplogroup M7a1a5* – Japan
          - Haplogroup M7a1a5a – Japan, Korea, Tianjin
        - Haplogroup M7a1a6
          - Haplogroup M7a1a6* – Japan, Philippines, Jiangsu, Shanxi, Shandong
          - Haplogroup M7a1a6a – Japan
        - Haplogroup M7a1a7
          - Haplogroup M7a1a7* – Japan, Korea
          - Haplogroup M7a1a7a – Uyghur
        - Haplogroup M7a1a8 – Japan, Jiangsu
        - Haplogroup M7a1a9 – Japan, Korea, Tianjin
        - Haplogroup M7a1a10 – Japan
      - Haplogroup M7a1b
        - Haplogroup M7a1b1
          - Haplogroup M7a1b1* – Japan, China (Minnan Han)
          - Haplogroup M7a1b1a – Japan
        - Haplogroup M7a1b2 – Japan
    - Haplogroup M7a2
      - Haplogroup M7a2* – Japan
      - Haplogroup M7a2a – Japan, Ulchi, Yakut
        - Haplogroup M7a2a1 – Japan
        - Haplogroup M7a2a2
          - Haplogroup M7a2a2* – Japan
          - Haplogroup M7a2a2a
            - Haplogroup M7a2a2a* – Japan (Gunma)
            - Haplogroup M7a2a2a1 – Japan (Aichi)
        - Haplogroup M7a2a3
          - Haplogroup M7a2a3a
            - Haplogroup M7a2a3a* – Udihe
            - Haplogroup M7a2a3a1 – Udihe
          - Haplogroup M7a2a3b – Evenk (Nyukzha River basin), Buryat
        - Haplogroup M7a2a4 – Japan
  - Haplogroup M7b'c
    - Haplogroup M7b
      - Haplogroup M7b1a
        - Haplogroup M7b1a1 – Thailand, Laos, Vietnam, Cambodia, Myanmar, Indonesia, China, Karakalpak, Kyrgyz, Mongush, Khamnigan
          - Haplogroup M7b1a1a – Thailand, Uyghur, Korea
            - Haplogroup M7b1a1a1 – Japan, Korea, China, Tajikistan, Thailand, Laos
              - Haplogroup M7b1a1a1a – Japan
              - Haplogroup M7b1a1a1b – Japan, Korea, China, Russia, Kyrgyzstan
              - Haplogroup M7b1a1a1c – Japan
              - Haplogroup M7b1a1a1d – Japan
            - Haplogroup M7b1a1a2 – Thailand, Vietnam, Malaysia, China
            - Haplogroup M7b1a1a3 – Thailand, Laos, Vietnam, China
          - Haplogroup M7b1a1b – Thailand, Laos, Vietnam, China (Hunan, Uyghur, Kyrgyz from Artux), England
          - Haplogroup M7b1a1c – Han Chinese, Uyghurs, Kyrgyz
            - Haplogroup M7b1a1c1 – Chinese, Bama Yao Autonomous County
          - Haplogroup M7b1a1d – Thailand, Laos, Tatar (Buinsk)
          - Haplogroup M7b1a1e – Thailand
            - Haplogroup M7b1a1e1 – Thailand, Vietnam, China
            - Haplogroup M7b1a1e2 – China
          - Haplogroup M7b1a1f – Thailand, Malaysia, Indonesia, Vietnam, China
          - Haplogroup M7b1a1g – Thailand
          - Haplogroup M7b1a1h – Thailand, Chinese (Han from Lanzhou, etc.), Vietnam, Korea, Japan
          - Haplogroup M7b1a1i – Taiwan (Amis), Philippines, Malaysia
        - Haplogroup M7b1a2
          - Haplogroup M7b1a2a – China (Uyghurs, Kyrgyz in Taxkorgan, Han, Mongol in Inner Mongolia)
            - Haplogroup M7b1a2a1 – Taiwan Aboriginal peoples, Philippines, Indonesia, Malaysia
              - Haplogroup M7b1a2a1a – Atayal, Saisiyat
              - Haplogroup M7b1a2a1b – Atayal
                - Haplogroup M7b1a2a1b1 – Atayal, Saisiyat
      - Haplogroup M7b1b – Khamnigan, China, Kyrgyz
    - Haplogroup M7c
      - Haplogroup M7c1 – China, Vietnam, Malaysia, Mongolia, Sarikoli, Kazakhstan
        - Haplogroup M7c1a – China, Korea, Japan, Vietnam, Thailand, Indonesia
          - Haplogroup M7c1a1
            - Haplogroup M7c1a1a – China, Mongolia
            - Haplogroup M7c1a1b – Azeri
              - Haplogroup M7c1a1b1 – Even (Sakkyryyr), Yakut (Vilyuy basin)
          - Haplogroup M7c1a2 – China
            - Haplogroup M7c1a2a – She, Uyghur
              - Haplogroup M7c1a2a1 – Japan, Korea, Uyghur
          - Haplogroup M7c1a3 – China, Japan, Vietnam
            - Haplogroup M7c1a3a – Korea
          - Haplogroup M7c1a4
            - Haplogroup M7c1a4a – China
            - Haplogroup M7c1a4b – China
          - Haplogroup M7c1a5 – Japan, Korea
        - Haplogroup M7c1b – Chinese
          - Haplogroup M7c1b1 – Buryats
          - Haplogroup M7c1b2
            - Haplogroup M7c1b2a – Khamnigan, Korea
            - Haplogroup M7c1b2b – China, Thailand, Laos, Malaysia
        - Haplogroup M7c1c – China, Thailand/Laos
          - Haplogroup M7c1c1 – China
            - Haplogroup M7c1c1a – China
              - Haplogroup M7c1c1a1 – Philippines
          - Haplogroup M7c1c2 – Thailand, China (Han)
          - Haplogroup M7c1c3 – Taiwan, Thailand, Philippines, Indonesia, Brunei, Malaysia, Kiribati, Nauru, Saudi Arabia, Madagascar
      - Haplogroup M7c2 – Taiwan, Hainan, Thailand/Laos
        - Haplogroup M7c2a – Thailand/Laos, China (incl. Hainan)
        - Haplogroup M7c2b – Thailand, Taiwan (Han), Czech
      - Haplogroup M7c3 – China (incl. Amis)
- Haplogroup M8 - China, Northern Thailand (Lisu), India
  - Haplogroup M8a: – found in East Asia, Central Asia, and Siberia
    - Haplogroup M8a1
      - Haplogroup M8a1a – Japan
      - Haplogroup M8a1b – southeastern Siberia (Udegey)
    - Haplogroup M8a2'3
      - Haplogroup M8a2'3* – Japan
      - Haplogroup M8a2 – found in Koryaks, Itelmens, Chukchis, Tuvans, Khakassians, Altayans, Mongolians, China (including Uyghurs), Koreans, Japan, Thailand/Laos
        - Haplogroup M8a2* – China (Hakka)
        - Haplogroup M8a2-T152C!!!
          - Haplogroup M8a2-T152C!!!* – China, Japan (Chiba)
          - Haplogroup M8a2a
            - Haplogroup M8a2a1 – found in Thailand, China, Japan
              - Haplogroup M8a2a1a
                - Haplogroup M8a2a1a* – Northeast Thailand (Saek)
                - Haplogroup M8a2a1a1
                  - Haplogroup M8a2a1a1* – China (Han from Wuhan)
                  - Haplogroup M8a2a1a1a – Central Thailand (Tai Yuan), Northern Thailand (Palaung)
              - Haplogroup M8a2a1b
                - Haplogroup M8a2a1b* – Chiang Mai Province (Khon Mueang)
                - Haplogroup M8a2a1b1 – Lamphun Province (Khon Mueang)
              - Haplogroup M8a2a1c – China, Japan (Aichi)
            - Haplogroup M8a2a2 – China
          - Haplogroup M8a2-A12530G/G14364A/T16297C – Uyghur
          - Haplogroup M8a2b – China (Maonan from Pingtang County)
            - Haplogroup M8a2b* - Japan, China (Shandong, Henan)
            - Haplogroup M8a2b1 (C9301T) - China (Anhui Medical University Hospital, etc.)
            - Haplogroup M8a2b2 (G12192A) - Russia (Ulchi, Nanai from Bogorodskoye, Ulchsky District)
            - Haplogroup M8a2b3 (T16311C!) - China, Thailand (Bangkok)
            - Haplogroup M8a2b4 (T9813d) - China (Zhejiang, etc.)
        - Haplogroup M8a2c – found in Japan and China
        - Haplogroup M8a2d – found in China (Shantou, Qingdao)
        - Haplogroup M8a2e – found in Taiwan (Ami, etc.) and in a Han Chinese living in the Denver, Colorado metropolitan area
        - Haplogroup M8a2f – China
      - Haplogroup M8a3
        - Haplogroup M8a3* – China (Guangdong, etc.), Kyrgyz (Artux), Russia (Verkhnyaya Gutara, Nerkha, and Kushun villages of Irkutsk Oblast)
        - Haplogroup M8a3a
          - Haplogroup M8a3a* – China, Russia (Ket from Turukhansk)
          - Haplogroup M8a3a1
            - Haplogroup M8a3a1* – China
            - Haplogroup M8a3a1a – China
          - Haplogroup M8a3a2 – China, Indonesia (Jawa Timur)
  - Haplogroup CZ - Northern Thailand (Hmong)
    - Haplogroup C – found especially in Siberia
      - Haplogroup C1 – found in Asia and America (Native Americans and Hispanics in particular)
      - Haplogroup C4
      - Haplogroup C7 – found in China and Ukraine.
    - Haplogroup Z – found in Northeast Europe, Siberia, Central Asia, and East Asia, including among Swedes, Sami, Finns, Russians, Ukrainians, Nogais, Abazins, Cherkessians, North Ossetians, Turks, Udmurts, Komi, Kets, Kalmyks, Hazara, Pashtuns, Tajiks, Turkmens, Uzbeks, Kazakhs, Kyrgyz, Uyghurs, Evens, Evenks, Dolgans, Yakuts, Yukaghirs, Khakas, Altaians, Altai Kizhi, Buryats, Nganasans, Koryaks, Itelmens, Ulchi, Japanese, Koreans, Chinese, and Tibeto-Burman peoples
- Haplogroup M9 – found in East Asia and Central Asia, especially in Tibet. In the Nepalese populations, it is prevalent mainly in Sherpa (27.4%), Tharu-CI (19.6%), Tamang (15.5%), Magar (13.5%), and Tharu-CII. Haplogroup M9* has additionally been found in ancient remains from the Red Deer Cave people in present-day Yunnan.
  - Haplogroup M9a'b
    - Haplogroup M9a – Han (Guangdong, Guangxi, Yunnan, Sichuan, Hunan, Taiwan, Anhui, Shaanxi, Shandong, Hebei), Korean (South Korea), Tujia (Hunan), Kinh (Hue), Mongol (Hohhot), Japanese, Lhoba [TMRCA 23,000 (95% CI 18,100 <-> 28,800) ybp]
      - Haplogroup M9a1 – Han (Hunan) [TMRCA 19,500 (95% CI 13,800 <-> 26,700) ybp]
        - Haplogroup M9a1a – Han (Hebei, Henan, Shaanxi, Anhui, Zhejiang, Hunan, Yunnan, Guangdong, Hong Kong, Taiwan), Manchu (Jilin), Korean (South Korea), Hui (Qinghai), Kazakh (Ili), Kyrgyz (Kyrgyzstan), Nepal [TMRCA 16,500 (95% CI 12,800 <-> 20,900) ybp]
          - Haplogroup M9a1a1 – Han (Henan, Shaanxi, Guangdong, Guangxi, Sichuan, Yunnan), Taiwan, Thailand/Laos, Hui (Yuxi), Tibetan (Nyingchi), Uyghur, Japanese (Hokkaido) [TMRCA 13,900 (95% CI 10,800 <-> 17,600) ybp]
            - Haplogroup M9a1a1a – Japanese, Korean (Seoul), Chinese (incl. a Henan Han), Khamnigan (Buryat Republic), Udege, Nivkh, Tibetan (Qinghai)
            - Haplogroup M9a1a1b – Japanese, Korean (South Korea), Mongol (Inner Mongolia), Han (Hunan)
            - Haplogroup M9a1a1c – Han (Gansu, Shaanxi, Henan, Liaoning, Zhejiang, Jiangxi, Hunan, Guangdong, Sichuan, Yunnan), Ainu, Japanese, Korean, Mongol (Hohhot), Uyghur (Ürümqi), Altaian, Tuvinian, Hui (Xinjiang, Kyrgyzstan), Tujia (Hunan), Bai (Yunnan), Yi (Yunnan)
              - Haplogroup M9a1a1c1 – Han (Henan)
                - Haplogroup M9a1a1c1a – Han (Henan, Anhui, Shandong, Liaoning, Sichuan, Yunnan, Xinjiang, Lanzhou), Korea, Japanese, Mongol (New Barga Left Banner), Tibetan (Liangshan), Hui (Ili)
                - Haplogroup M9a1a1c1b – Tibetan (Gansu, Qinghai, Sichuan, Yunnan, Chamdo, Lhasa, Nagqu, Ngari, Nyingchi, Shannan, Shigatse), Monpa (Nyingchi), Dirang Monpa (Arunachal Pradesh), Lachungpa (Sikkim), Tu (Huzhu Tu Autonomous County), Dongxiang (Gansu), Buryat (Inner Mongolia, Buryat Republic), Han (Qinghai), Hui (Qinghai), Nepalese
            - Haplogroup M9a1a1d – Salar (Qinghai), Han (Yanting), Bai (Dali)
          - Haplogroup M9a1a2 – Tharu (Chitwan District, Uttar Pradesh), Tibetan (Nagqu, Yunnan, Qinghai, Shigatse), Lhoba (Nyingchi), Dhimal (West Bengal), Chin (Myanmar), Adi (Assam), Tu (Qinghai), Uyghur (Ürümqi), Mongol (Ili), Han (Hunan, Shanxi, Sichuan, Yunnan, Shandong, Ili), Yi (Yunnan), Bai (Dali), Nepalese [TMRCA 6,153.9 ± 5,443.2 ybp; CI=95%]
        - Haplogroup M9a1b – Tibetan (Nyingchi, Nagqu, Lhasa, Chamdo, Ngari, Shannan, Shigatse, Sichuan, Yunnan, Qinghai, Gansu), Monba (Nyingchi), Lhoba (Shannan), Uzbekistan (Fergana), Dongxiang (Linxia), Naga (Sagaing), Burman (Bago), Chin (Chin State), Han (Hunan, Sichuan, Yunnan, Liaoning), Yi (Shuangbai) [TMRCA 9,416.6 ± 3,984.0 ybp; CI=95%]
          - Haplogroup M9a1b1 – Tibetan, Lhoba, Arunachal Pradesh (Sonowal Kachari, Wanchoo, Gallong), Assam (Adi), Sikkim (Lepcha, Lachung), Qinghai (Salar, Tu), Mongol (Mongolia, Inner Mongolia), Guangxi (Gelao, Palyu), Thailand, Bengal, Pakistan (Karachi), Meghalaya (Khasi, Garo), Bodo (West Bengal), Rabha (West Bengal), Rajbanshi (West Bengal), Indonesia, Han (Shaanxi, Henan, Gansu, Sichuan, Yunnan), Hui (Gansu, Qinghai), Burman (Ayeyarwady, Magway, Sagaing), Rakhine (Rakhine, Magway), Chin (Chin State), Naga (Sagaing), Mech (Jhapa district, Nepal), Nepalese, Mosuo (Yunnan), Yi (Yunnan), She (Guizhou), Hani (Yunnan), Pumi (Yunnan), Bai (Dali), Va (Yunnan) [TMRCA 6,557.4 ± 2,102.4 ybp; CI=95%]
          - Haplogroup M9a1b2 – Tibetan (Diqing), Han (Dujiangyan), Kazakh (Altai Republic), Kalmyk [TMRCA 3,225.9 ± 3,494.4 ybp; CI=95%]
      - Haplogroup M9a4
        - Haplogroup M9a4a – Kinh (Hanoi), Han (Shaanxi, Shandong, Zhejiang, Taiwan, Sichuan, Guangdong), Li (Hainan), Mulam (Guangxi), Jino (Xishuangbanna), Dai (Xishuangbanna), Chiang Mai
        - Haplogroup M9a4b – Kinh (Hanoi), South Korea
      - Haplogroup M9a5 – Han (Hunan, Hong Kong), Thailand, Pubiao (Malipo), Li (Hainan), Mulam (Luocheng), Zhuang (Bama Yao Autonomous County), Kinh (Hanoi)
    - Haplogroup M9b – Han (Luocheng, Dujiangyan, Shaanxi), Cham (Binh Thuan), Mulam (Luocheng), Bouyei (Guizhou), Yi (Hezhang), Bunu (Dahua), Hui (Ili), Thailand (Phuan from Sukhothai Province)
  - Haplogroup E – a subclade of M9 – found especially in Taiwan (Aboriginal peoples), Maritime Southeast Asia, and the Mariana Islands [TMRCA 23,695.4 ± 6,902.4 ybp; CI=95%]
- Haplogroup M10 – small clade found in East Asia, Southeast Asia, Bangladesh, Central Asia, Saudi Arabia, southern Siberia, Russia, Belarus, and Poland [TMRCA 23,600 (95% CI 17,100 <-> 31,700) ybp]
  - M10-514C!/A15218G/C16362T!
    - M10-514C!/A15218G/C16362T!* – Poland
    - M10-T3167C/C4140T/T8793C/C12549T/A13152G/T14502C/C15040T/T15071C
      - M10a [TMRCA 16,700 (95% CI 11,800 <-> 22,800) ybp]
        - M10a* – Myanmar
        - M10a1 – China, Thailand, Myanmar, Japan, Shor, Daur [TMRCA 14,400 (95% CI 11,100 <-> 18,400) ybp]
          - M10a1* – Myanmar, Central Thailand (Mon), Japan (Aichi)
          - M10a1-G16129A!!!
            - M10a1-A13105G!/T16362C – Shor, Daur
            - M10a1a
              - M10a1a* – China, Saudi Arabia
              - M10a1a1
                - M10a1a1a – Mongolia, Korea, Japan, China (Han from Kunming, etc.), Iron Age Black Sea Scythian
                - M10a1a1b – Altai, Korea, Japan, China
                  - M10a1a1b* – Chinese Uyghur
                  - M10a1a1b1
                    - M10a1a1b1* – Japan, China
                    - M10a1a1b1a – China
                    - M10a1a1b1b – China
                    - M10a1a1b1c – Uyghur, Altai-Kizhi
                  - M10a1a1b2
                    - M10a1a1b2* – Taiwan (Hakka)
                    - M10a1a1b2a – Japan
              - M10a1a2 – Northern Thailand (Khon Mueang from Lamphun Province)
              - M10a1a3 – Taiwan
            - M10a1b
              - M10a1b* – South Korea, China (Han from Tai'an, etc.), India (Gallong, etc.)
              - M10a1b1 – China (Makatao)
              - M10a1b2 – China (Tingri County)
            - M10a1c – China
        - M10a2 – Japan (Aichi), Kalmyk, Russian (northwestern Russia)
  - M10b – China (Shui), Vietnam (Cờ Lao)
- Haplogroup M11 – small clade found especially among the Chinese and also in some Japanese, Koreans, Oroqen, Yi, Tibetans, Tajiks in Dushanbe, Tajikistan, and Bangladeshis [TMRCA 20,987.7 ± 5,740.8 ybp; CI=95%]
  - Haplogroup M11* – Myanmar
  - Haplogroup M11a'b'd
    - Haplogroup M11a'b [TMRCA 16,209.0 ± 4,396.8 ybp; CI=95%]
      - Haplogroup M11a – Korea, Turkey [TMRCA 11,972.3 ± 3,523.2 ybp; CI=95%]
        - Haplogroup M11a-C198T
          - Haplogroup M11a-C198T* – Wancho, Miao (from Fenghuang, Hunan)
          - Haplogroup M11a1 – Gallong, Tibet [TMRCA 8,668.6 ± 4,041.6 ybp; CI=95%]
        - Haplogroup M11a2 – Tibet, Han (Zhanjiang) [TMRCA 8,776.3 ± 3,715.2 ybp; CI=95%]
        - Haplogroup M11a3 – Uyghur, Buryat, Oroqen
      - Haplogroup M11b [TMRCA 12,962.0 ± 4,819.2 ybp; CI=95%]
        - Haplogroup M11b1 – Taiwan (Minnan)
          - Haplogroup M11b1a – Japan
            - Haplogroup M11b1a1 – Japan, Han (Tai'an)
        - Haplogroup M11b2 – Japanese (Hokkaido), China, Altai-Kizhi, Tajik (Dushanbe)
    - Haplogroup M11d – China, Teleut, Kyrgyz, Iran
  - Haplogroup M11c – Japan, Korea
- Haplogroup M12'G
  - Haplogroup M12 – small clade found especially among the aborigines of Hainan Island as well as in other populations of China, Japan, Korea, Pashtuns, Tibet, Myanmar, Thailand, Cambodia, and Vietnam [TMRCA 31,287.5 ± 5,731.2 ybp; CI=95%]
    - Haplogroup M12a [TMRCA 26,020.6 ± 5,808.0 ybp; CI=95%]
      - Haplogroup M12a1 – Thailand/Laos
        - Haplogroup M12a1a – Thailand (Htin in Phayao Province, Black Tai in Kanchanaburi Province, Mon in Kanchanaburi Province, Khon Mueang in Chiang Mai Province), Laos (Lao in Luang Prabang), Hainan
          - Haplogroup M12a1a1 – China (esp. Hainan)
          - Haplogroup M12a1a2 – Hainan, Tu
        - Haplogroup M12a1b – Tibet, Thailand (Blang in Chiang Rai Province, Khon Mueang in Chiang Rai Province, Palaung in Chiang Mai Province, Mon in Kanchanaburi Province), Hainan, Vietnam
      - Haplogroup M12a2 – Thailand, Hainan, Myanmar
    - Haplogroup M12b – Thailand (Khmu in Nan Province)
      - Haplogroup M12b1 – Vietnam, Myanmar
        - Haplogroup M12b1a – Laos (Lao in Vientiane)
          - Haplogroup M12b1a1
          - Haplogroup M12b1a2 – Thailand (Soa in Sakon Nakhon Province)
            - Haplogroup M12b1a2a – Cambodia, Malaysia
            - Haplogroup M12b1a2b – Cambodia
        - Haplogroup M12b1b – Thailand (Suay in Surin Province, Khmer in Surin Province, Lao Isan in Roi Et Province, Black Tai in Loei Province), Cambodia
      - Haplogroup M12b2 – Thailand, Hainan
        - Haplogroup M12b2a – Cambodia
  - Haplogroup G – found especially in Japan, Mongolia, and Tibet and in indigenous peoples of Kamchatka (Koryaks, Alyutors, Itelmens), with some isolated instances in diverse places of Asia [TMRCA 31,614.8 ± 5,193.6 ybp; CI=95%]
    - Haplogroup G1 – Japan [TMRCA 21,492.9 ± 5,414.4 ybp; CI=95%]
      - Haplogroup G1a – China (Uyghurs), Thailand (Black Lahu in Mae Hong Son Province) [TMRCA 18,139.1 ± 5,462.4 ybp; CI=95%] (TMRCA 18,800 [95% CI 12,600 <-> 26,900] ybp)
        - Haplogroup G1a1 – Korea, Vietnam (Dao), China (Sarikolis, Uyghurs, etc.), Tajikistan (Pamiris), Russia (Todzhin) [TMRCA 12,200 (95% CI 10,100 <-> 14,600) ybp]
          - Haplogroup G1a1a – Japan, Korea, Taiwan [TMRCA 5,200 (95% CI 3,800 <-> 7,000) ybp]
            - Haplogroup G1a1a1 – Japan, Korea, China (Daur, Korean in Arun Banner) (TMRCA 3,100 [95% CI 1,250 <-> 6,300] ybp)
            - Haplogroup G1a1a2 – Japan
            - Haplogroup G1a1a3 – Japan
            - Haplogroup G1a1a4 – Japan, Korea
          - Haplogroup G1a1b – Taiwan (Makatao), Russia (Altai-Kizhi)
        - Haplogroup G1a2'3
          - Haplogroup G1a2 – Manchu, Han (Beijing), Tibet, Miao
          - Haplogroup G1a3 – Japan, Korea [TMRCA 6,451.1 ± 4,521.6 ybp; CI=95%]
      - Haplogroup G1b [TMRCA 7,246.3 ± 5,088.0 ybp; CI=95%] (TMRCA 10,300 [95% CI 7,000 <-> 14,700] ybp)
        - Haplogroup G1b1 – (TMRCA 8,400 [95% CI 6,200 <-> 11,100] ybp) Koryaks (Magadan Oblast, Severo-Evensk District of Magadan Oblast), Nivkhs, Evens (Kamchatka), Yakut (HGDP)
        - Haplogroup G1b2'3'4 (G1b-G16129A!) – (TMRCA 7,700 [95% CI 5,000 <-> 11,400] ybp) Evenks (Iengra), Evens (Magadan region), Orok, Nivkhs, Koryaks (Magadan Oblast, Severo-Evensk District of Magadan Oblast, Kamchatka)
          - Haplogroup G1b2 – (TMRCA 2,600 [95% CI 375 <-> 9,300] ybp) Koryaks (Magadan region, Severo-Evensk District of Magadan Region), Chukchi
          - Haplogroup G1b3 – (TMRCA 4,700 [95% CI 1,000 <-> 13,500] ybp) Chukchi (Anadyr), Evens (Kamchatka)
          - Haplogroup G1b4 – (TMRCA 1,450 [95% CI 225 <-> 5,100] ybp) Yukaghirs, Even (Tompo)
      - Haplogroup G1c – Korea (Seoul), China (Han from Lanzhou, etc.), Thailand (Black and Red Lahu in Mae Hong Son Province), Malaysia (Seletar) [TMRCA 12,910.6 ± 6,009.6 ybp; CI=95%] (TMRCA 17,200 [95% CI 11,600 <-> 24,600] ybp)
        - Haplogroup G1c1 – Han (Sichuan, Tai'an)
        - Haplogroup G1c2 – China (including at least one Han from Beijing)
    - Haplogroup G2 – Cambodia [TMRCA 26,787.5 ± 4,617.6 ybp; CI=95%]
      - Haplogroup G2a'c – China, USA
        - Haplogroup G2a [TMRCA 17,145.5 ± 5,270.4 ybp; CI=95%]
          - Haplogroup G2a1 – Korea, China (Hebei, Eastern China), Tibetans (Chamdo, Lhasa, Tingri), Uyghur (Artux), Daur, India (Ladakh, Punjabi Hindu), Myanmar (Bamar from Kayin State), Thailand, Singapore, Kyrgyz, Kazakhstan, Afghanistan (Balkh), Israel (haMerkaz), Saudi Arabia, Russia (Chelyabinsk Oblast, Taimyr Evenk, Tuvinian), Belarus (Lipka Tatars), Norway, USA ("caucasian") [TMRCA 14,045.7 ± 4,742.4 ybp; CI=95%]
            - Haplogroup G2a1a (C12525T) - Georgia (Abkhaz), Karachay (Karachay-Cherkess Republic), Yakuts (Central), Buryat (Inner Mongolia)
            - Haplogroup G2a1b (A12753G)
              - Haplogroup G2a1b1 (T146C! * G207A * T8063C * G9266A * A15758G) - Japan
              - Haplogroup G2a1b2 (A8832C) - Thailand (Mon from Central Thailand)
              - Haplogroup G2a1b3 (T16126C) - Thailand (Tai Khuen from North Thailand)
                - Haplogroup G2a1b3a (A7606G) - Thailand (Thai from Central Thailand)
            - Haplogroup G2a1-T16189C! - China (Han from Yili, Tibetan from Shigatse), Korea, Japan, Vietnam (Nung), Georgian
              - Haplogroup G2a1-T16189C!-A16194G - Japan (Aichi)
                - Haplogroup G2a1c – Japan, Korea
                  - Haplogroup G2a1c1 – Japan
                  - Haplogroup G2a1c2 – Japan
              - Haplogroup G2a1-T16189C!-C3654T - Eastern China
              - Haplogroup G2a1-T16189C!-G16526A - Uyghurs
              - Haplogroup G2a1-T16189C!-T15784C - Korea
                - Haplogroup G2a1-T16189C!-T15784C-T7609C - China, India (Lachungpa)
              - Haplogroup G2a1d – Kyrgyz (Artux), Uzbek (Uzbekistan), Poland [TMRCA 7,303.3 ± 3,657.6 ybp; CI=95%]
                - Haplogroup G2a1d1 – Japan, Hong Kong
                  - Haplogroup G2a1d1a – Japan
                - Haplogroup G2a1d2 – Thailand (Thai from Ratchaburi Province), China (Shandong), India, England
                  - Haplogroup G2a1d2a – Thailand (Tai Yuan from Ratchaburi Province and Chiang Mai Province, Palaung from Chiang Mai Province, Lisu from Mae Hong Son Province), China (Yao, Eastern China)
                  - Haplogroup G2a1d2c - China (Eastern China), Thailand (Thai from Central Thailand)
            - Haplogroup G2a1e – Japan, Korea
            - Haplogroup G2a1f - China (Taihang area in Henan province)
            - Haplogroup G2a1g – China, Mongols, Karakalpak
            - Haplogroup G2a1-G13194A - Tibetan (Tingri)
              - Haplogroup G2a1h - India (Ladakh, Wancho), China (Fujian)
            - Haplogroup G2a1i - Lhoba
              - Haplogroup G2a1i1 (C3417T) - Yakut (Vilyuy), Buryat (Eastern Buryat from Buryat Republic)
            - Haplogroup G2a1j (C5840T) - Thailand (Tai Yuan from North Thailand), China
            - Haplogroup G2a1k (A8521G) - Poland
            - Haplogroup G2a1l (C10043T) - Russia (Pskov Oblast), Norway (Buskerud)
            - Haplogroup G2a1m (C8766T) - Buryat (Inner Mongolia)
              - Haplogroup G2a1m1 (C7229T) - Daur, Barga (Inner Mongolia), Buryat (Buryat Republic), Khamnigan (Zabaikal Region)
                - Haplogroup G2a1m1a (A4395G) - Kyrgyzstan (Kyrgyz)
            - Haplogroup G2a1n (T14180C) - Kyrgyzstan (Kyrgyz)
            - Haplogroup G2a1o (T173C) - China (Henan Province)
            - Haplogroup G2a1p (A374G) - Ladakh
            - Haplogroup G2a1q (T16356C) - Deng, China (Fujian)
          - Haplogroup G2a-T152C! - China (Eastern China), Thai (Chanthaburi)
            - Haplogroup G2a2 – China, Uyghur, Kyrgyz (Artux, Tashkurgan), Kazakhstan, Chelkan (Turochak, Biyka, Kurmach-Baigol), Nogai (Karachay-Cherkess Republic), Yakut (Vilyuy, Northeast, Central), Buryat (Kizhinginsky District, Olkhonsky District, Tunkinsky District, Bokhansky District), Hazara (Pakistan), Volga Tatar (Republic of Tatarstan), Hungary, Finland
              - Haplogroup G2a2a – China, Uyghur, Buryat (Bulagad from Bokhansky District), Soyot, Turkey, Bashkortostan, Poland
              - Haplogroup G2a2b (G12007A) – Buryat (Tunkinsky District, Ekhirit-Bulagatsky District)
              - Haplogroup G2a2c (T16136C) – Uyghur
              - Haplogroup G2a2d (C5456T) - Uyghur
                - Haplogroup G2a2d1 (T8978C) - Uyghur
              - Haplogroup G2a2e (T4772C) - Buryat (Ekhirid from Kurumkansky District, Bulagad/Ekhirid from Ekhirit-Bulagatsky District)
            - Haplogroup G2a-T152C!-C16262T - ancient DNA from Irkutsk Oblast (Irk067 from the Novyj Kachug site at the left bank of the upper Lena River, cal BC 3755 to cal BC 3640)
              - Haplogroup G2a3 – Russia (Tatarstan), Azerbaijanian (Iran), Uyghur (Artux)
                - Haplogroup G2a3a – Russia (Tyumen Oblast, Tatar from Buinsk), Sweden, Germany
            - Haplogroup G2a4 – China (Taihang area in Henan province), Taiwan (Taitung), Ukraine
              - Haplogroup G2a4b (T6707C) - China (Tianjin, Eastern China)
            - Haplogroup G2a5 – Japan, Korea, Kyrgyz, Kazakh, Karakalpak, Telengit, Tubalar, Yakut, Balkar (Kabardino-Balkaria), Buryat (Selenginsky District)
              - Haplogroup G2a5a – Buryat (Barguzinsky District, Kizhinginsky District)
            - Haplogroup G2a-T152C!-T1189C - Uyghur
              - Haplogroup G2a-T152C!-T1189C-A10804G - Buryat (Bulagad/Ekhirid from Ekhirit-Bulagatsky District, Bulagad/Ekhirid from Selenginsky District)
              - Haplogroup G2a-T152C!-T1189C-C6101T - Daurs
              - Haplogroup G2a-T152C!-T1189C-T16271C - China (Liaoning), Nivkh (Nogliki)
            - Haplogroup G2a-T152C!-C3351T - China (Jiangxi Province, Eastern China), Buryat (Ekhirid/Bulagad from Olkhonsky District)
            - Haplogroup G2a-T152C!-C10834T - China (Jilin), Thailand (Iu Mien from Nan Province)
        - Haplogroup G2-A3397G
          - Haplogroup G2-A3397G-T15262C - China, Mongol (Hulunbuir)
          - Haplogroup G2-A3397G-C6623T - Uyghurs
        - Haplogroup G2c – China (Taihang area in Henan province), Uyghurs
      - Haplogroup G2b [TMRCA 22,776.4 ± 5,059.2 ybp; CI=95%]
        - Haplogroup G2b1 – Tibetan (Shannan), Cambodia [TMRCA 16,830.4 ± 5,616.0 ybp; CI=95%]
          - Haplogroup G2b1a – China (Chongqing, Shaanxi), Thailand (Nyaw from Nakhon Phanom Province), Kyrgyzstan, Spain [TMRCA 13,366.8 ± 5,443.2 ybp; CI=95%]
            - Haplogroup G2b1a1 – Thailand (Tai Yuan from Uttaradit Province, Khon Mueang from Chiang Mai Province, Karen from Mae Hong Son Province), Myanmar (Karen from Kayin State and Bago Division)
              - Haplogroup G2b1a1a (C16239T) - Thailand (Skaw Karen from southern Mae Hong Son Province, Skaw Karen from northern Mae Hong Son Province), Myanmar (Karen from Kayin State)
            - Haplogroup G2b1a2 – Ewenki from Inner Mongolia
              - Haplogroup G2b1a2a (G2120A) - China
            - Haplogroup G2b1a3 (A4562T) - Taiwan (Hakka)
            - Haplogroup G2b1a4 (C4599T) - Thailand (Tai Khuen from Northern Thailand, Tai Lue from Chiang Rai Province)
            - Haplogroup G2b1a5 (T11353C) - China (Hebei Province), Dungan
          - Haplogroup G2b1b – Uyghurs, Tibetan (Shannan), India (Lachungpa) [TMRCA 4,662.1 ± 4,492.8 ybp; CI=95%]
        - Haplogroup G2b2 – Late Medieval eastern Mongolia (SHU001), Sweden, Russia, Scotland, Iraq, Japan [TMRCA 20,476.0 ± 5,481.6 ybp; CI=95%]
          - Haplogroup G2b2a – India (Gallong, Kathodi) [TMRCA 15,328.9 ± 6,057.6 ybp; CI=95%]
          - Haplogroup G2b2b – China, Japan (Chiba)
          - Haplogroup G2b2c – China (Taihang area in Henan province), Tatar (Buinsk)
          - Haplogroup G2b2d (T5641C) – Japan (Tokyo), Kyrgyz (Tashkurgan)
            - Haplogroup G2b2d1 (A6647T) - Uyghur, Kumandin (Soltonsky District), Todzhi (Adir-Kezhig), Buryat (Bulagad/Ekhirid from Ekhirit-Bulagatsky District)
      - Haplogroup G2d (A11443G) - Thailand (Tai Yuan in Central Thailand, Iu Mien in Phayao Province)
        - Haplogroup G2d1 (A328G) - Thailand (Tai Yuan in Central Thailand, Lisu in Mae Hong Son Province)
    - Haplogroup G3 [TMRCA 23,919.9 ± 6,931.2 ybp; CI=95%]
      - Haplogroup G3a
        - Haplogroup G3a1'2 – Pakistan (Azad Kashmir)
          - Haplogroup G3a1 [TMRCA 7,300 (95% CI 3,700 <-> 13,000) ybp]
            - Haplogroup G3a1a – Tibetan (Shigatse), Sherpa, Naxi, Hani
            - Haplogroup G3a1b – Tibet (Nagqu), Sarikoli (Tashkurgan)
            - Haplogroup G3a1c (C2389A) - skeletal remains of Bo people from Chang'an Township, Weixin County, Zhaotong, Yunnan, China and similar people from Yangxu Town, Youjiang District, Baise, Guangxi, China and Tham Lod rockshelter, Pang Mapha District, Mae Hong Son Province, Thailand
          - Haplogroup G3a1'2-A12661G - Uyghur
          - Haplogroup G3a2 [TMRCA 12,600 (95% CI 3,900 <-> 30,200) ybp]
            - Haplogroup G3a2* – Taiwan (Minnan)
            - Haplogroup G3a2-T152C!!!
              - Haplogroup G3a2-T152C!!!* – Udegey (Agzu), Korea, Japan
              - Haplogroup G3a2a – Japan, Korean, Uzbek
              - Haplogroup G3a2b (C13209T) - Uyghur
                - Haplogroup G3a2b1 (G13718C) - China (Eastern China, Shandong)
        - Haplogroup G3a3 [TMRCA 12,900 (95% CI 6,000 <-> 24,200) ybp] – China, Buryat (Khori from Khorinsky District), Ukraine, Poland, Slovakia, Albania, United Kingdom
          - Haplogroup G3a3a (G16156A) - China, Uyghur (Artux)
            - Haplogroup G3a3a1 (A390G) - Inner Mongolia
              - Haplogroup G3a3a1a (C2263A) - Uyghur
                - Haplogroup G3a3a1a1 (A3523G) - Bashkortostan
      - Haplogroup G3b [TMRCA 17,800 (95% CI 12,800 <-> 24,100) ybp] - India (Lachungpa), Tibetan (Lhasa), Lhoba
        - Haplogroup G3b1 – Tibet (Tibetan from Nyingchi, Tibetan from Tingri, Monpa, Deng), India (Dirang Monpa)
        - Haplogroup G3b2 - China, Tibet (Monpa, Qinghai), Thailand (Lawa from the southwest of Mae Hong Son Province, Tai Yuan from Central Thailand)
    - Haplogroup G4 – Japan [TMRCA 7,500 (95% CI 3,100 <-> 15,500) ybp]
    - Haplogroup G5 – Vietnam (Dao), Thailand (Lao Isan from Nakhon Ratchasima Province) [TMRCA 7,900 (95% CI 5,400 <-> 11,200) ybp]
- Haplogroup M13'46'61
  - Haplogroup M13 – small clade found among Tibetans in Tibet, Oirat Mongols in Xinjiang, Barghuts in Hulunbuir, Koreans, and Yakuts and Dolgans in central Siberia [TMRCA 43,169.4 ± 4,944.0 ybp; CI=95%]
    - M13a [TMRCA 19,266.4 ± 6,720.0 ybp; CI=95%]
      - M13a1 – China [Uyghurs, Mongol, Tibetan (Chamdo, Nagqu)], India [TMRCA 9,539.2 ± 6,249.6 ybp; CI=95%]
        - M13a1a – Japan
        - M13a1b – China (Tibet, Uyghurs)
          - M13a1b1 – Buryat, Barghut, Yakut (Central), Evenk (Taimyr)
      - M13a2 – Tibet, Thailand [TMRCA 8,726.0 ± 4,828.8 ybp; CI=95%]
    - M13b [TMRCA 31,191.8 ± 6,873.6 ybp; CI=95%]
      - M13b1 – Nepal (Tharu), Northeast India, Thailand, Jahai [TMRCA 22,537.6 ± 7,123.2 ybp; CI=95%]
      - M13b2 – Sherdukpen, Dirang Monpa, Tibet [TMRCA 5,441.4 ± 3,888.0 ybp; CI=95%]
    - M13c – Myanmar, Thailand (Mon in Kanchanaburi Province), China (Lahu)
  - Haplogroup M46 – Myanmar, Moken, Urak Lawoi, Malagasy
  - Haplogroup M61 – Thailand (Phuan in Suphan Buri Province, Phuan in Phichit Province, Phuan in Sukhothai Province, Saek in Nakhon Phanom Province), Myanmar, Vietnam, Borneo
    - Haplogroup M61a – China (Yi, Tibet, Lachungpa)
- Haplogroup M14 – Australia (Kalumburu), Saudi Arabia, India, Tibet?
- Haplogroup M15 – Australia (Kalumburu), Tibet?
- Haplogroup M17 – found in Luzon, Chams, Maniq, Mon, Blang, Lawa, Thai, and Laotians
  - Haplogroup M17a – Thailand, Vietnam (Cham)
  - Haplogroup M17c – Vietnam (Cham)
    - Haplogroup M17c1 – Philippines (Abaknon)
      - Haplogroup M17c1a – Indonesia
        - Haplogroup M17c1a1 – Philippines (Abaknon)
          - Haplogroup M17c1a1a – Cambodia (incl. Stieng)
- Haplogroup M19'53
  - Haplogroup M19 – found in the Batak people of Palawan
  - Haplogroup M53 – India
    - Haplogroup M53b – Kamar of Chhattisgarh
- Haplogroup M21 – small clade found in SE Asia (Semang, Semelai, Temuan, Jehai, Thailand, Maniq, Mon, Karen, Indonesia), China, and Bangladesh
  - Haplogroup M21a – Batek
  - Haplogroup M21b
    - Haplogroup M21b1 – Cambodia (Lao, Tompoun)
      - Haplogroup M21b1a – Semelai, Philippines (Cuyunon of Palawan Island), Indonesia
    - Haplogroup M21b2 – Moken, Cham, Malaysia, India
- Haplogroup M22 – Drung (Yunnan)
  - Haplogroup M22a – Vietnam (Kinh, Cham), Temuan
  - Haplogroup M22b – Vietnam (Kinh), China (Han in Meizhou), Cambodia
- Haplogroup M23'75 – China
  - M23 – found in Madagascar, South Africa, USA, Canada
  - M75 – found in China, USA
- Haplogroup M24'41
  - Haplogroup M24
    - Haplogroup M24a – found in Thailand, Cambodia (Khmer), Palawan (Tagbanua), and China
    - Haplogroup M24b – found in Thailand, Cambodia (Jarai), and China
  - Haplogroup M41 – found in South Asia
    - Haplogroup M41b – found in Andhra Pradesh, India
    - Haplogroup M41c – found in Andhra Pradesh, India
- Haplogroup M27 – found in Melanesia (Papua New Guinea, Solomon Islands)
- Haplogroup M28 – found in Melanesia (Papua New Guinea, Vanuatu, Fiji, Solomon Islands), Polynesia (Tonga, Samoa, Futuna), and in a single Han individual from China
- Haplogroup M29'Q
  - Haplogroup M29 – found in Melanesia (Papua New Guinea, Solomon Islands)
  - Haplogroup Q – found in Melanesia and Australia (Aboriginal peoples)
- Haplogroup M31 – found among the Onge, in the Andaman Islands
  - Haplogroup M31a
    - Haplogroup M31a1
      - Haplogroup M31a1a – Andaman Islands
      - Haplogroup M31a1b – Andaman Islands
    - Haplogroup M31a2
      - Haplogroup M31a2a – northern India (Munda, etc.), Myanmar
      - Haplogroup M31a2b – India (Paudibhuiya)
  - Haplogroup M31b'c
    - Haplogroup M31b – northern India, Nepal, Myanmar
    - Haplogroup M31c – Nepal (Tharu)
- Haplogroup M32'56 – Thailand
  - Haplogroup M32
    - Haplogroup M32a – – found in the Andaman Islands
    - Haplogroup M32c – Madagascar, Saudi Arabia, Thailand/Laos, USA
  - Haplogroup M56 – India (Korku)
- Haplogroup M33 – India
  - Haplogroup M33a – found in Nepal (Tharu), India
    - Haplogroup M33a1
      - Haplogroup M33a1a – Lepcha, Tharu
      - Haplogroup M33a1b – Dongri Bhil, Gujarat
    - Haplogroup M33a2'3
      - Haplogroup M33a2 – India (Katkari, etc.), Egypt (Siwa)
        - Haplogroup M33a2a – India, Iraq (Marsh Arab), Saudi Arabia
      - Haplogroup M33a3 – found among Hindus in New Delhi, India
        - Haplogroup M33a3a – Myanmar, Toto
        - Haplogroup M33a3b – found in Thailand and in Tajiks in Dushanbe, Tajikistan
  - Haplogroup M33b'c (M33-T16362C, M33-a) – northern India
    - Haplogroup M33b – Nepal (Tharu), India
      - Haplogroup M33b1 – Sonowal Kachari, Dai (Jianshui)
      - Haplogroup M33b2 – India, Nepal (Kathmandu)
    - Haplogroup M33c – Ashkenazi Jews (Lithuania, Russia, Belarus, Ukraine, Romania, Hungary, Austria, Latvia, Poland), Han Chinese (Guangdong, Shaanxi, Sichuan, Hunan, Jiangsu, Jilin), Yao (Jianghua, Guangxi, Guangdong), Miao (Hunan), Tibetans (Yunnan), Zhuang (Guangxi), speakers of Kam-Tai languages (Guizhou), Thai (Thailand), Vietnamese
  - Haplogroup M33d – India (Malpaharia, etc.)
- Haplogroup M34'57
  - Haplogroup M34 – small clade found in South Asia
    - Haplogroup M34a – found in Karnataka, India
      - Haplogroup M34a1 – India
        - Haplogroup M34a1a – India, Myanmar
      - Haplogroup M34a2 – India (Pauri Bhuiya, Munda)
    - Haplogroup M34b – India (Nihal, etc.)
  - Haplogroup M57 – India (Kathakur)
    - Haplogroup M57a – India (Katkari, Nihal), England, Ireland
    - Haplogroup M57b – India (Kathakur)
      - Haplogroup M57b1 – India (Dongri Bhil)
- Haplogroup M35 – Nepal (Tharu)
  - Haplogroup M35a – Sarikoli, Armenia, Mesolithic Sri Lanka
    - Haplogroup M35a1 – India (Andh, Dongri Bhil), Mauritius
      - Haplogroup M35a1a – India (Betta Kurumba, Mullukurunan)
    - Haplogroup M35a2 – India (Andh, etc.)
  - Haplogroup M35b – found in Karnataka, Ladakh, Nepal (Tharu), Myanmar, Thailand, Slovakia
    - Haplogroup M35b1'2'3 – India, Germany, USA
      - Haplogroup M35b1 – India (Madia)
      - Haplogroup M35b2 – India (Kathodi, Munda), Russia
      - Haplogroup M35b3 – India (Ladakh)
    - Haplogroup M35b4 – India (Toto), Nepal (Kathmandu)
  - Haplogroup M35c – India (Kathodi, Andh)
- Haplogroup M39'70
  - Haplogroup M39 – found in South Asia
  - Haplogroup M70 - Nepal (Sherpas, etc.), Tibet, Vietnam (La Hủ)
- Haplogroup M40 – found in South Asia
  - Haplogroup M40a – Yemen
    - Haplogroup M40a1
      - Haplogroup M40a1a
      - Haplogroup M40a1b
- Haplogroup M42'74
  - Haplogroup M42 – Sri Lanka
    - Haplogroup M42a – Australian Aboriginal peoples
    - Haplogroup M42b
      - Haplogroup M42b1
      - Haplogroup M42b2
  - Haplogroup M74 - Cambodia (Kampong Thom, Brao), Thailand (Lao Isan, Central Thai), Vietnam (Thái)
    - Haplogroup M74a - Thailand (Hmong, Iu Mien, Lao Isan from Nakhon Ratchasima Province), Vietnam (Cờ Lao, Nùng, H'Mông, Mang), China, Taiwan
    - Haplogroup M74b
      - Haplogroup M74b1
      - Haplogroup M74b2
- Haplogroup M48 – rare clade found in Saudi Arabia
- Haplogroup M49 – found among ancient specimens in the Euphrates valley
- Haplogroup M55'77
  - Haplogroup M55 - Myanmar, Thailand, Malay
  - Haplogroup M77 - Indonesia
- Haplogroup M62'68
  - Haplogroup M62
  - Haplogroup M68
    - Haplogroup M68a1
      - Haplogroup M68a1a - Cambodia, Vietnam
      - Haplogroup M68a1b
    - Haplogroup M68a2
      - Haplogroup M68a2a- Cambodia
      - Haplogroup M68a2b
      - Haplogroup M68a2c
- Haplogroup M71 - India
  - Haplogroup M71a'b (M71-C151T) - India, Myanmar, Cambodia (Mel), Laos (Lao in Vientiane), Thailand (Lawa, Karen, Shan, Blang, Phuan, Lao Isan, Khon Mueang), Vietnam (Ede). Also found in approximately 10,500 year-old human remains ("Longlin") from Longlin Cave near De'e, Longlin County, Guangxi Province, China.
    - Haplogroup M71a - Thailand (Thai, Tai Yuan, Khon Mueang), China (Fujian)
      - Haplogroup M71a1 - China (Han from Xiamen and Lanzhou, Naxi)
        - Haplogroup M71a1a - China (Bouyei from Pingtang, etc.), Vietnam (Mang, Kinh), Thailand (Phuan from Central Thailand)
      - Haplogroup M71a2 - India, Myanmar, Thailand (Thai from Central Thailand and Eastern Thailand, Tai Yuan and Tai Khün from Northern Thailand, Blang), Indonesia, Philippines
    - Haplogroup M71b - Thailand (Thai from Western Thailand, Khon Mueang from Chiang Mai Province, Tai Yuan, Tai Khün), China (Bouyei from Pingtang, Han from Dongguan)
  - Haplogroup M71c - Thailand (Urak Lawoi, Moken, Thai from Central Thailand), Vietnam (Cham from Bình Thuận, Kinh)
- Haplogroup M73'79
  - Haplogroup M73
    - Haplogroup M73a
      - Haplogroup M73a1
        - Haplogroup M73a1a
        - Haplogroup M73a1b - Vietnam
      - Haplogroup M73a2 - Papua New Guinea, East Timor
      - Haplogroup M73a3 - Philippines (Aklan)
    - Haplogroup M73b - Indonesia
      - Haplogroup M73b1 - Vietnam, Cambodia, Indonesia
    - Haplogroup M73c
  - Haplogroup M79 - China
- Haplogroup M80'D
  - Haplogroup M80 – found in Batak people of Palawan
  - Haplogroup D – found in Eastern Eurasia, Native Americans, Central Asia and occasionally also in West Asia and Europe.

== Subclades ==
=== Tree ===
This phylogenetic tree of haplogroup M subclades is based on the paper by Mannis van Oven and Manfred Kayser Updated comprehensive phylogenetic tree of global human mitochondrial DNA variation and subsequent published research.

- M
  - M1
    - M1a
      - M1a1
        - M1a1a
        - M1a1b
          - M1a1b1
        - M1a1c
        - M1a1d
        - M1a1e
        - M1a1f
      - M1a2
        - M1a2a
        - M1a2b
      - M1a3
        - M1a3a
        - M1a3b
      - M1a4
      - M1a5
    - M1b
      - M1b1
        - M1b1a
      - M1b2
        - M1b2a
  - M2
    - M2a
      - M2a1
      - M2a2
      - M2a3
    - M2b
      - M2b1
      - M2b2
  - M3
    - M3a
  - M4"45
    - M4
      - M4a
      - M4b
        - M4b1
    - M18'38
      - M18
      - M38
    - M30
      - M30a
      - M30b
      - M30c
        - M30c1
          - M30c1a
            - M30c1a1
      - M30d
    - M37
      - M37a
    - M43
    - M45
  - M5
    - M5a
      - M5a1
        - M5a1a
        - M5a1b
      - M5a2
        - M5a2a
  - M6
  - M7
    - M7a
      - M7a1
        - M7a1a
          - M7a1a1
            - M7a1a1a
          - M7a1a2
          - M7a1a3
          - M7a1a4
            - M7a1a4a
          - M7a1a5
          - M7a1a6
          - M7a1a7
        - M7a1b
      - M7a2
        - M7a2a
        - M7a2b
    - M7b'c'd'e
      - M7b'd
        - M7b
          - M7b1'2
            - M7b1
            - M7b2
              - M7b2a
              - M7b2b
              - M7b2c
          - M7b3
            - M7b3a
        - M7d
      - M7c'e
        - M7c
          - M7c1
            - M7c1a
            - M7c1b
              - M7c1b1
          - M7c2
            - M7c2a
          - M7c3
            - M7c3a
            - M7c3b
            - M7c3c
        - M7e
  - M8
    - M8a
      - M8a1
      - M8a2
        - M8a2a
        - M8a2b
    - CZ
      - C
      - Z
  - M9
    - M9a'b'c'd
      - M9a'c'd
        - M9a'd
          - M9a
            - M9a1
            - M9a2
            - M9a3
          - M9d
        - M9c
      - M9b
    - E
  - M10'42
    - M10
      - M10a
        - M10a1
        - M10a2
    - M42
      - M42a
  - M11
    - M11a
    - M11b
  - M12'G
    - M12
      - M12a
    - G
  - M13
    - M13a
      - M13a1
  - M14
  - M15
  - M21
    - M21a'b
      - M21a
      - M21b
    - M21c'd
      - M21c
      - M21d
  - M22
  - M23
  - M25
  - M27
    - M27a
    - M27b
    - M27c
  - M28
    - M28a
    - M28b
  - M29'Q
    - M29
      - M29a
      - M29b
    - Q
  - M31
    - M31a
      - M31a1
        - M31a1a
        - M31a1b
      - M31a2
    - M31b'c
      - M31b
        - M31b1
        - M31b2
      - M31c
  - M32'56
    - M32
      - M32a
      - M32c
    - M56
  - M33
    - M33a
    - M33b
    - M33c
  - M34
    - M34a
  - M35
    - M35a
    - M35b
  - M36
    - M36a
  - M39
    - M39a
  - M40
    - M40a
  - M41
  - M44'52
    - M44
    - M52
  - M46
  - M47'50
    - M47
    - M50
  - M48
  - M49
  - M51
  - M52'58
  - M52
  - D

== Notable members ==
- Broadcast journalist Robert Siegel is a member of haplogroup M1a1b.
- Violinist Joshua Bell belongs to haplogroup M33c.

== See also ==
- Genealogical DNA test
- Genetic genealogy
- Human mitochondrial genetics
- Population genetics
- Human mitochondrial DNA haplogroups
- Red Deer Cave people

Phylogenetic tree of human mitochondrial DNA (mtDNA) haplogroups

Mitochondrial Eve (L)

L0
L1–6

L1
L2

L3

L4
L5
L6
M
N

CZ
D
E
G
Q

O
A
S
R

I
W
X
Y
C
Z
B
F
R0

pre-JT

P

U
HV
JT
K
H
V
J
T
