= MZR =

MZR or mzr may refer to:

- Mazda MZR engine, the brand name of straight-four engines engineered and built by the Mazda Motor Corporation
- MZR, the IATA code for Mazar-i-Sharif International Airport, Afghanistan
- MZR, the Indian Railways station code for Murtizapur Junction railway station, Maharashtra, India
- mzr, the ISO 639-3 code for Marúbo language, Brazil
- Mengzi Ren, a fossilized human
