= M18 =

M18 or M-18 may refer to:

== Aircraft ==
- Messerschmitt M 18, an early German airliner
- Miles M.18, a Miles aircraft
- Mooney M-18 Mite, a low-wing monoplane
- PZL-Mielec M-18 Dromader, an agricultural and aerial-firefighting aircraft
- Myasishchev M-18, a design for a Soviet supersonic bomber with a variable-sweep wing

== Firearms and military equipment ==
- M18 Claymore mine, an American anti-personnel landmine
- M18 Hellcat, an American tank destroyer used in World War II
- M18 smoke grenade, a colored smoke grenade
- M18 recoilless rifle, a late-World War II recoilless rifle
- SIG Sauer M18 pistol, a compact, carry sized SIG Sauer P320 used by the United States armed forces
- M1918 helmet (Switzerland), a Swiss steel combat helmet

== Roads and highways ==
- M18 motorway (Great Britain)
- M18 motorway (Ireland)
- M-18 (Michigan highway)
- M18 (East London), a Metropolitan Route in East London, South Africa
- M18 (Cape Town), a Metropolitan Route in Cape Town, South Africa
- M18 (Johannesburg), a Metropolitan Route in Johannesburg, South Africa
- M18 (Pretoria), a Metropolitan Route in Pretoria, South Africa
- M18 (Port Elizabeth), a Metropolitan Route in Port Elizabeth, South Africa
- List of M18 roads

== Other uses ==
- M18, a metric screw thread
- Messier 18, an open star cluster in the constellation Sagittarius
- M18 or M-18, Mara 18, Central American street gang
- Hope Municipal Airport, Arkansas, United States (FAA location identifier: M18)
- A line of 18-volt power tools manufactured by Milwaukee Electric Tool Corporation
- M18, a student club at the Bauhaus University, Weimar, Germany
- M18, a media content rating issued by the Infocomm Media Development Authority of Singapore
- Haplogroup M18
- McLaren M18, a Formula 5000 racing car
