= List of M18 roads =

This is a list of roads designated M18. Road entries are sorted in the countries alphabetical order.

- M-18 road (Bosnia and Herzegovina) a road connecting Sarajevo, Trnovo, Foča and Trebinje
- M18 motorway (Great Britain), a road connecting Rotherham and Goole in Yorkshire, England
- M18 motorway (Ireland), a road connecting junction 9 on the Shannon bypass in County Clare and Gort in County Galway
- M18 road (Malawi), a road in Malawi
- M-18 (Michigan highway), a road connecting US 10 near North Bradley and M-72 near Luzerne
- M18 highway (Russia), a road connecting Saint Petersburg and Murmansk
- Highway M18 (Ukraine), a road connecting Yalta and Kharkiv
- M18 (East London), a Metropolitan Route in East London, South Africa
- M18 (Cape Town), a Metropolitan Route in Cape Town, South Africa
- M18 (Johannesburg), a Metropolitan Route in Johannesburg, South Africa
- M18 (Pretoria), a Metropolitan Route in Pretoria, South Africa
- M18 (Port Elizabeth), a Metropolitan Route in Port Elizabeth, South Africa
- M18 road (Zambia), a road in Zambia

== See also ==
- List of highways numbered 18
