= Haplogroup M30 (mtDNA) =

Human mitochondrial DNA haplogroup

- Possible time of origin: 14,600 to 30,200 YBP
- Possible place of origin: South Asia
- Ancestor: M4'45
- Descendants: M30a, M30b, M30c, M30d, M30e
- Defining mutations: 195A, 15431A, 12007A

In human mitochondrial genetics, Haplogroup M30 is a human mitochondrial DNA (mtDNA) haplogroup.

== Origin ==
Haplogroup M30 (coding region: 195A-514dCA-12007-15431) is a South-Asian or an India-specific maternal lineage of the macrohaplogroup M identified by the mutations T195A, G15431A and G12007A.

Haplogroup M30 used to be a part of M4 haplogroup distinguished by G15431A. Haplogroup M30 shares a common coding region mutation (12007) together with the M4, M18, M37 and M38 haplogroups from the root of haplogroup M (superhaplogroup M4'30). M4′30 super-clade is the only clade that shares an intermediate lineage between 2 haplogroups, while the rest of all M lineages have originated independently from the root of macrohaplogroup M; thus supporting the idea of rapid dispersal of modern humans along the Asian coast after they left Africa, followed by a long period of isolation.

Haplogroup M30 was identified in 2005 based on complete mitochondrial genome sequences of 24 Indian samples. It was designated as a new lineage with sub-haplogroups M30a, M30b, M30c, M30d based on observed mutations sites. The mutations characterizing this lineage were observed in five samples from eastern part of India, that is Bihar (Kurmi, Yadav and Baniya), West Bengal (Mahishya), Orissa (Saora) and two samples from south India (Christians of Karnataka and Lambadi of Andhra Pradesh). Previously identified Haplogroup M18 was collapsed to reside in M30 as a sub-lineage.

In 2006, the definition of M30 was narrowed down by identifying it with the mutations T195A, 15431A and G12007A. The study detailed an individual from the Reddy population of Andhra Pradesh categorized into M30a; a sample of Thogataveera from Andhra Pradesh classified into M30b; the presence of M30c in Thogataveera of Andhra Pradesh and Chaturvedi of Uttar Pradesh, and finally, the identification of M30d in Bhargava of Uttar Pradesh and Thogataveera of Andhra Pradesh. In 2009, Subhaplogroup M30e was identified among Kathodi, Kathakur and Mathakur in Western region of India.

In 2006, Sahoo and Kashyap reported haplogroup M30 in Oriya Brahmins, Karanams, Khandayats, Gope (aka Gour or Yadavs); and in tribes of Juang and Saora of Orissa. The Saora exhibited a high frequency of M30 (of about 32% of the sample size) followed by Karanams (24%), Oriya Brahmins (20%) and Juang (20%). Khandayat and Gope showed a lower frequency (about 6%) of M30. M30 was also detected at low frequencies (1.5%–2.5%) in Pardhan, Naikpod Gond and Andh tribal populations of Andhra Pradesh.

The age of M30 lineage was estimated at 33,042 ± 7,840 Years Before Present. However, Thangarajah, et al. (2006) dated it to 15,400 ± 6300 YBP. Rajkumar, et al. put forward the estimated coalescence time of haplogroup M30 to be 15,400 ± 6300 ybp, and that of its sub-haplogroups M30a and M30c to be 5100 ± 3600 ybp. The ages of M30b and M30d were computed to be 4177 ± 2800 years and 12,800 ± 5700 ybp respectively. This period corresponds with the late-Mesolithic in India and the Levant.

== Distribution ==
=== South Asia ===
M30 is found in a wide variety of ethnic, religious, and linguistic groups in both North and South India. Some of these groups include the Gujarati people, Kannada people, Parsis, and Bene Israel. Jayasekara et al. found many carriers of M30 among the people of Sri Lanka. A number of carriers have been found in Pakistan, Afghanistan, Nepal, and Bangladesh as well.

Haplogroup	GenBank ID	Country/Region	Population	Source
M30	DQ246813	India	—	Rajkumar 2005
M30	DQ246815	India	—	Rajkumar 2005
M30	DQ246816	India	—	Rajkumar 2005
M30	DQ246827	India	—	Rajkumar 2005
M30	FJ383657	Karnataka, India	—	Kumar 2009
M30	FJ383658	Gujarat, India	—	Kumar 2009
M30	FJ383659	Gujarat, India	—	Kumar 2009
M30	FJ383667	Maharashtra, India	—	Kumar 2009
M30	FJ383673	Madhya Pradesh, India	—	Kumar 2009
M30	FJ383675	Madhya Pradesh, India	—	Kumar 2009
M30	HM156694	India	—	Govindaraj 2011
M30	JX462681	India	—	Khan 2013
M30	JX462684	India	—	Khan 2013
M30	KX467298	Jammu and Kashmir, India	—	Sharma 2017
M30	KX467299	Jammu and Kashmir, India	—	Sharma 2017
M30	KX467300	Jammu and Kashmir, India	—	Sharma 2017
M30	MH830089	Chetlat Island, India	—	Gajbhiye 2019
M30	MH830090	Chetlat Island, India	—	Gajbhiye 2019
M30	MH830091	Chetlat Island, India	—	Gajbhiye 2019
M30	MH830092	Chetlat Island, India	—	Gajbhiye 2019
M30	MH830093	Chetlat Island, India	—	Gajbhiye 2019
M30	MH830094	Chetlat Island, India	—	Gajbhiye 2019
M30	MH830095	Chetlat Island, India	—	Gajbhiye 2019
M30	MH830096	Chetlat Island, India	—	Gajbhiye 2019
M30	MH830097	Chetlat Island, India	—	Gajbhiye 2019
M30	MN595703	Pakistan	—	Rahman 2021
M30	MN595772	Pakistan	—	Rahman 2021
M30	MN595825	Pakistan	—	Rahman 2021
M30	MN595857	Pakistan	—	Rahman 2021
M30	OM489686	Sri Lanka	—	Jayasekera 2022
M30	OM489688	Sri Lanka	—	Jayasekera 2022
M30	OM489690	Sri Lanka	—	Jayasekera 2022
M30	OM489701	Sri Lanka	—	Jayasekera 2022
M30	OM489714	Sri Lanka	—	Jayasekera 2022
M30	PQ137269	Pakistan	—	Bukhari 2025
M30	PQ137315	Pakistan	—	Bukhari 2025
M30-C16234T	AY922258	India	—	Sun 2006
M30-C16234T	EU597504	Pakistan	Sindhis	Hartmann 2008
M30-C16234T	JX462683	India	—	Khan 2013
M30-C16234T	KF450921	Pakistan	Sindhis	Lippold 2014
M30-C16234T	KX467294	Jammu and Kashmir, India	—	Sharma 2017
M30-C16234T	KX467295	Jammu and Kashmir, India	—	Sharma 2017
M30-C16234T	KX467297	Jammu and Kashmir, India	—	Sharma 2017
M30-C16234T	MT506289	India	Zoroastrian Parsis	Patell 2020
M30-C16234T	MT506290	India	Zoroastrian Parsis	Patell 2020
M30-C16234T	MT506291	India	Zoroastrian Parsis	Patell 2020
M30-C16234T	MT506292	India	Zoroastrian Parsis	Patell 2020
M30-C16234T	MT506293	India	Zoroastrian Parsis	Patell 2020
M30-C16234T	MT506294	India	Zoroastrian Parsis	Patell 2020
M30-C16234T	MT506295	India	Zoroastrian Parsis	Patell 2020
M30-C16234T	MT506296	India	Zoroastrian Parsis	Patell 2020
M30-C16234T	MT506297	India	Zoroastrian Parsis	Patell 2020
M30-C16234T	MT506298	India	Zoroastrian Parsis	Patell 2020
M30-C16234T	PQ137364	Pakistan	—	Bukhari 2025
M30a	FJ383661	Rajasthan, India	—	Kumar 2009
M30a	FJ383662	Rajasthan, India	—	Kumar 2009
M30a	FJ383663	Rajasthan, India	—	Kumar 2009
M30a	FJ383666	Rajasthan, India	—	Kumar 2009
M30a	JQ446403	India	—	Khan 2013
M30a	KY933649	India	—	Husain 2017
M30a	OP004792	India	Gujaratis	Alqaisi 2023
M30a	OP004800	India	Gujaratis	Alqaisi 2023
M30a1	AY289072	southern India	Koragas	Ingman-Gyll 2006
M30a1	AY922254	India	—	Sun 2006
M30a2	FJ383660	Rajasthan, India	—	Kumar 2009
M30a2	FJ383665	Rajasthan, India	—	Kumar 2009
M30b	AY289071	southern India	Kannada people	Ingman-Gyll 2006
M30b	AY922277	India	—	Sun 2006
M30b	FJ383664	Rajasthan, India	—	Kumar 2009
M30b	KM043056	Punjab, India	Jat Sikh	FamilyTreeDNA
M30b	KX467301	Jammu and Kashmir, India	—	Sharma 2017
M30b	MN595716	Pakistan	—	Rahman 2021
M30b	MN595856	Pakistan	—	Rahman 2021
M30b	MT506269	India	Zoroastrian Parsis	Patell 2020
M30b	OP004790	India	Gujaratis	Alqaisi 2023
M30b	PV166895	southern India	Coorgs	Kumar 2025
M30c	PQ306076	India	—	Sequeira 2024
M30c	PV166852	southern India	Coorgs	Kumar 2025
M30c	PV166869	southern India	Coorgs	Kumar 2025
M30c	PV166873	southern India	Coorgs	Kumar 2025
M30c	PV166876	southern India	Coorgs	Kumar 2025
M30c	PV166885	southern India	Coorgs	Kumar 2025
M30c	PV166889	southern India	Coorgs	Kumar 2025
M30c	PV166892	southern India	Coorgs	Kumar 2025
M30c1	AF382013	India	—	Maca-Meyer 2006
M30c1	AY922268	India	—	Sun 2006
M30c1	KR074253	India	—	Marrero 2016
M30c1	MK460513	Bangladesh	—	Saha 2019
M30c1	MN595711	Pakistan	—	Rahman 2021
M30c1	MN595814	Pakistan	—	Rahman 2021
M30c1	OM489683	Sri Lanka	—	Jayasekera 2022
M30c1	OM489726	Sri Lanka	—	Jayasekera 2022
M30c1	OM489728	Sri Lanka	—	Jayasekera 2022
M30c1	OP004759	India	Gujaratis	Alqaisi 2023
M30c1	PQ137277	Pakistan	—	Bukhari 2025
M30c1	PQ137295	Pakistan	—	Bukhari 2025
M30c1a	AY922257	India	—	Sun 2006
M30c1a	HM036539	northern India	Ladakhis	Sharma 2011
M30c1a	HM036550	northern India	Ladakhis	Sharma 2011
M30c1a1	EF556149	India	Bene Israel Jew	Behar 2008
M30d	MN595893	Pakistan	—	Rahman 2021
M30d	PQ137361	Pakistan	—	Bukhari 2025
M30d1	AY922256	India	—	Sun 2006
M30d1	FJ383654	Nepal	—	Kumar 2009
M30d1	FJ383655	Nepal	—	Kumar 2009
M30d1	FJ383656	Nepal	—	Kumar 2009
M30d1	KF450900	Pakistan	Makrani people	Lippold 2014
M30d1	MT506288	India	Zoroastrian Parsis	Patell 2020
M30d2	AY922255	India	—	Sun 2006
M30d2	FJ383668	Maharashtra, India	—	Kumar 2009
M30d2	FJ383669	Maharashtra, India	—	Kumar 2009
M30d2	HM156674	India	—	Govindaraj 2011
M30e	FJ383670	Maharashtra, India	—	Kumar 2009
M30e	FJ383672	Maharashtra, India	—	Kumar 2009
M30e	FJ383676	Maharashtra, India	—	Kumar 2009
M30e	FJ383677	Maharashtra, India	—	Kumar 2009
M30e	FJ383678	Gujarat, India	—	Kumar 2009
M30e	FJ383679	Gujarat, India	—	Kumar 2009
M30f	DQ246818	India	—	Rajkumar 2005
M30f	FJ383674	Madhya Pradesh, India	—	Kumar 2009
M30f	GU480014	India	—	Sharma 2011
M30f	KF450935	Pakistan	Sindhis	Lippold 2014
M30f	OP004736	India	Gujaratis	Alqaisi 2023
M30f	OP004776	India	Gujaratis	Alqaisi 2023
M30g	FJ383671	Madhya Pradesh, India	—	Kumar 2009
M30g	JF742213	Kathmandu, Nepal	—	Wang 2012
M30g	JX462693	India	—	Khan 2013
M30g	MN595844	Pakistan	—	Rahman 2021
M30g	PQ137378	Pakistan	—	Bukhari 2025

=== East-Central Asia and East Asia ===
M30 has also been detected in the maternal lineages of China. Peng et al. (2017) have found one individual who belongs to mtDNA haplogroup M30c1 in a sample of 28 Tajiks from Dushanbe, Tajikistan, two individuals who belong to mtDNA haplogroup M30h (bearing mutations at the 16093, 4394, 4491, and 12451 loci) in a sample of 68 Kyrgyz from Taxkorgan, Xinjiang, China, one individual who belongs to mtDNA haplogroup M30* (bearing additional mutations at the 11437 and 16274 loci) in a sample of 66 Wakhis from Taxkorgan, and one individual who belongs to mtDNA haplogroup M30 (bearing additional mutations at the 16234 and 16153 loci, possibly marking a pre-M30e branch) in a sample of 86 Sarikolis from Taxkorgan.

Haplogroup	GenBank ID	Country/Region	Population	Source
M30	FJ748727	Tibet, China	Tibetan	Ji 2010
M30	MF522852	Tajikistan	Kyrgyz	Peng 2017
M30	MF522877	Tajikistan	Kyrgyz	Peng 2017
M30	MF523093	China	Sarikoli Tajiks	Peng 2017
M30	MF523219	Tajikistan	Wakhi	Peng 2017
M30c1	MF522990	Dushanbe, Tajikistan	Tajiks	Peng 2017

=== Southeast Asia ===
Haplogroup	GenBank ID	Country/Region	Population	Source
M30	MG272917	Thailand	—	Kutanan 2018
M30c1	KP346045	Myanmar	Bamar people	Li 2015

=== West Asia and Northern Africa ===
M30 has been detected in Palestinian Arabs and is thought to be due to a recent gene flow from India into that region. It is also found in Eastern Yemeni populations, Saudi Arabia, the United Arab Emirates, Kuwait, Upper Egypt, and Kesra (Tunisia). M30 individuals were found to constitute 7.5% of the total population of Hadramawt (Yemen).

Haplogroup	GenBank ID	Country/Region	Population	Source
M30	EU370397	Saudi Arabia	—	Abu-Amero 2008
M30-C16234T	KF451210	Israel	Palestinian Arabs	Lippold 2014
M30-C16234T	KF451249	HaMerkaz, Israel	Palestinian Arabs	Lippold 2014
M30-C16234T	KJ446739	—	Palestinian Arabs	Zheng 2014
M30b	KR074248	Saudi Arabia	—	Marrero 2016
M30c1	MF437059	United Arab Emirates	—	Al-Jasmi 2020
M30c1	MF437077	United Arab Emirates	—	Al-Jasmi 2020
M30d1	MF437278	United Arab Emirates	—	Al-Jasmi 2020

=== Europe ===
M30 is uncommon among the native ethnic groups of Europe.

Haplogroup	GenBank ID	Country/Region	Population	Source
M30	KF161562	Denmark	—	Li 2013
M30-C16234T	KP076664	France	French	FamilyTreeDNA

== Pre-Modern M30 Samples ==
In South Asia
Haplogroup	ID	Alt ID	Location	Period	Author(s)
M30	I3406	R43	Roopkund Lake, India	885-980 CE	Harney, É. et al.
M30	I6549	—	Swat District, Pakistan	167-46 BCE	—
M30	I6552	—	Swat District, Pakistan	200-0 BCE	—
M30	I6894	—	Swat District, Pakistan	400-200 BCE	—
M30-C16234T	I6945	R64	Roopkund Lake, India	687-870 CE	Harney, É. et al.
M30-C16234T	—	Med1	Kashmir valley, India	1444-1617 CE	Dwivedi, A. et al.
M30c	I3346	R15	Roopkund Lake, India	717-889 CE	Harney, É. et al.
M30c1	I12149	—	Swat District, Pakistan	1000-800 BCE	—
M30c1	I12470	—	Swat District, Pakistan	1000-800 BCE	—
M30d1	I7723	—	Swat District, Pakistan	400-200 BCE	—
M30d1	I12461	—	Swat District, Pakistan	1000-800 BCE	—
M30g	I12134	—	Swat District, Pakistan	1000-800 BCE	—

Outside of South Asia
Haplogroup	ID	Alt ID	Location	Period	Author(s)
M30a	I2123	—	Gonur Depe, Turkmenistan	2452-2140 BCE	—
M30b	I11466	—	Shahr-i Sokhta, Iran	2500-2000 BCE	—

== Subclades ==
=== Tree ===
This phylogenetic tree of haplogroup subclades is based on the Van Oven 2008 tree and subsequent published research.

- M30 T195A G15431A
  - M30a G513A
    - M30a1 G6366A
    - M30a2 T11935C
  - M30b T152C! G5147A
  - M30c T146C! A12234G
    - M30c1 A16166-
      - M30c1a C16069T
        - M30c1a1 G9966A
  - M30d C15259T
    - M30d1 G1598A
    - M30d2 C10160T
  - M30-C16234T
    - M30e T152C! T6620C C13303T
  - M30f A5894G T16368C
  - M30g T204C C6119T

== See also ==
- Genealogical DNA test
- Genetic genealogy
- Human mitochondrial genetics
- Population genetics
- Human mitochondrial DNA haplogroups

Phylogenetic tree of human mitochondrial DNA (mtDNA) haplogroups

Mitochondrial Eve (L)

L0
L1–6

L1
L2

L3

L4
L5
L6
M
N

CZ
D
E
G
Q

O
A
S
R

I
W
X
Y
C
Z
B
F
R0

pre-JT

P

U
HV
JT
K
H
V
J
T
