= Haplogroup M18 =

Human mitochondrial DNA haplogroup

- Possible time of origin: 17,100 ± 4,700 ybp (Metspalu), 20,800 ± 8,900 ybp (Thangaraj)
- Possible place of origin: India / South Asia
- Ancestor: M4'30
- Defining mutations: 12498 and 15942 (coding region) and 194 (control region)

In human mitochondrial genetics, haplogroup M18 is a human mitochondrial DNA (mtDNA) haplogroup. It is an India-specific lineage.

== Origin ==
M18 is a descendant of the macro-Haplogroup M (mtDNA) and an ancient Indian-specific variant of M. Haplogroup M18 shares a common coding region mutation (12007) together with the M4, M30, M37 and M38 haplogroups from the root of haplogroup M (superhaplogroup M4'30). M4′30 super-clade is the only clade that shares an intermediate lineage between 2 haplogroups, while the rest of all M lineages have originated independently from the root of macrohaplogroup M; thus supporting the idea of rapid dispersal of modern humans along the Asian coast after they left Africa, followed by a long period of isolation.

Awaiting further information from complete mtDNA sequences, the haplogroup M18 was first defined by Metspalu et al., in 2004 by using the transversion at np 16318. This was later revised by Thangaraj et al., in 2006. Currently, the haplogroup is characterized by two coding region mutations, 12498 and 15942, and an additional control region mutation 194.

== Distribution ==
A 2004 study of Metspalu et al., analyzed mtDNA variation across samples of 796 Indians, 436 Iranians and compared them across samples from Europe, China, and Thailand. The study showed prevalence of M18 at low frequencies across a wide geographical area comprising south-eastern parts of Saudi Arabia, widely across Iran, Pakistan, India, Nepal, Bangladesh and Myanmar.

Metspalu's study revealed that the spatial distribution of M18 peaked across a portion of Punjab Pakistan, Punjab, India, Rajasthan and across a large portion of Andhra Pradesh.

The high incidence (33%) of the M18 nodal haplotype among the Austroasiatic-speaking Lodha of West Bengal suggested a possible founder effect in this population. It also explained the nearly two-fold difference between the coalescence estimates for this cluster calculated with and without the tribal data, in Metspalu's study.

Since an intense genetic drift (particularly founder effects) could introduce a bias into the coalescence time calculation, therefore Metspalu et al., calculated the coalescence time of haplogroup M18 with and without the Lodha sample, and found it to be 9,400 ± 3,200 ybp and 17,100 ± 4,700 ybp respectively. Thangaraj et al., estimated the coalescence age of Haplogroup M18 to be 20,800 ± 8900 ybp (Thangaraj et al., 2006).

To sum up, Haplogroup M18 individuals have been found in

- Saudi Arabia
- Iran
- Afghanistan
- Pakistan
- India
- Nepal
- Bhutan
- China
- Bangladesh
- Myanmar

Additionally, Haplogroup M18a has been found in a Mesolithic hunter-gatherer near Balangoda, Sri Lanka dated cal BP 5455-5375.

== Distribution in India ==
A relatively high frequency of M18 haplogroup was observed in Pardhan of Andhra Pradesh, while it was completely absent in Naikpod Gond and Andh (Thanseem et al., 2006). M18 was found in Brahmins of Uttar Pradesh (Sun et al., 2006), Desasth Brahmin of Maharashtra (Gaikwad and Kashyap, 2005), Khandayats of Orissa (Sahoo and Kashyap, 2006) and Oraon from Bihar (Thangaraj et al., 2006).

Chandrasekar A and Raghavendra Rao, et al., confirmed the monophyletic origin of Haplogroup M18, and found it occurring in high frequency in Mal Paharia people (at 29% of sample size).

The study by Metspalu et al., found haplogroup M18 across Andhra Pradesh and southeastern part of Tamil Nadu, but completely absent in neighboring Karnataka and Kerala. A possible explanation is the facilitation of admixture along the coastlines of the Arabian Sea and the Bay of Bengal. However, as the absolute frequency of this haplogroup is rather low, it cannot be ruled out that an increase of sample size would disrupt the observed spread-pattern.
