= Mengzi Ren =

Mengzi Ren (MZR) is a fossil of a woman found in the Red Deer Cave in modern-day China. She lived around 14,000 years ago during the Late Pleistocene era. Her genome has similarities to both modern-day East Asian and indigenous American genomes, and she is believed to be closely related to the East Asian ancestors of indigenous Americans. Her mitochondrial DNA belongs to a lineage of the M9 haplogroup, which is now extinct.
