= Yacha, Guangxi =

Yacha 桠杈镇
- Town
- Location in Guangxi
- Coordinates: 24°57′31″N 105°14′37″E
- Country: People's Republic of China
- Autonomous Region: Guangxi
- Prefecture-level city: Baise
- Autonomous county: Longlin Various Nationalities Autonomous County
- Time zone: UTC+8 (China Standard)

Yacha (Chinese: 桠杈) is a town of Longlin Various Nationalities Autonomous County, Guangxi, China. As of 2018, it has 7 villages under its administration.
