= De'e =

De'e 德峨镇
- Town
- Location in Guangxi
- Coordinates: 24°38′11″N 105°10′00″E
- Country: China
- Region: Guangxi
- Prefecture-level city: Baise
- County: Longlin
- Time zone: UTC+8 (China Standard)

De'e (Chinese: 德峨; pinyin: Dé'é) is a town under the administration of Longlin Various Nationalities Autonomous County, Guangxi, China, located in the southwest of the county. As of 2018, it has 15 villages under its administration. It is inhabited by several ethnic minorities, including the Miao, Yi, Gelao, and Zhuang. Ethnic minorities account for 93.6 percent of the town's population.

Each year, at the beginning of the lunar new year, the Tiapo Festival (跳坡节; pinyin: Tiàopō Jié; literally "leaping on the hillsides festival"), a Miao festival featuring the music and dance, is held. Other nationalities living in the area, including the Yi, Gelao, Zhuang, and Han, also participate in this festival.
