= Longlin Various Nationalities Autonomous County =

Longlin 隆林县 · Lungzlinz Yen
- Autonomous county
- 隆林各族自治县 · Lungzlinz Gakcuz Swciyen; Longlin Various Nationalities Autonomous County
- Longlin County government

- Location of the seat in Guangxi
- Coordinates (Longlin County government): 24°46′14″N 105°20′38″E
- Country: China
- Autonomous region: Guangxi
- Prefecture-level city: Baise
- County seat: Xinzhou

Area
  - Total: 3,452 km^{2} (1,333 sq mi)

Population (2020)
  - Total: 350,765
  - Density: 101.6/km^{2} (263.2/sq mi)
- Time zone: UTC+8 (China Standard)
- Postal code: 533400
- Website: http://www.gxll.gov.cn/

Longlin Various Nationalities Autonomous County (Chinese: 隆林各族自治县; pinyin: Lónglín Gèzú Zìzhìxiàn) is an autonomous county, under the jurisdiction of the prefecture-level city of Baise, in the west of Guangxi, China, bordering Guizhou Province to the north and west. As of 2019, the county's population was 437,907 people.

The county is inhabited by several ethnic minorities, including the Miao, Yi, Gelao and Zhuang, who constitute approximately 80% of the county's population.

== History ==
Present-day Longlin was first incorporated into the Song dynasty in 1253, when it fell under the jurisdiction of Anlongdong as part of the Sicheng Prefecture. In 1402, the area was reorganized as Anlong Prefecture, until 1666, when it was again reorganized as Xilong Prefecture. Xilong Prefecture underwent administrative changes in 1729, but otherwise went unchanged until 1912, when the Republic of China was established and the area was reorganized as Xilong County.

The area became part of the People's Republic of China in March 1950, and a communist-led local government was set up on March 18, 1950. On January 1, 1953, the area was renamed from Xilong County to Longlin County.

== Geography ==
Longlin is bordered by Tianlin County to the east, Xilin County to the south, Xingyi, Guizhou to the west, and by Anlong County and Ceheng County in Guizhou Province to the north. The county is home to the Tianshengqiao I and Tianshengqiao II dams, which sit along the Nanpan River.

=== Climate ===
Climate data for Longlin, elevation 672 m (2,205 ft), (1991–2020 normals, extremes 1981–2010)
Month	Jan	Feb	Mar	Apr	May	Jun	Jul	Aug	Sep	Oct	Nov	Dec	Year
Record high °C (°F)	33.2 (91.8)	34.5 (94.1)	38.0 (100.4)	39.8 (103.6)	40.5 (104.9)	39.2 (102.6)	37.7 (99.9)	37.3 (99.1)	37.4 (99.3)	33.3 (91.9)	32.5 (90.5)	28.7 (83.7)	40.5 (104.9)
Mean daily maximum °C (°F)	15.0 (59.0)	18.7 (65.7)	23.0 (73.4)	28.2 (82.8)	30.2 (86.4)	30.5 (86.9)	31.1 (88.0)	31.2 (88.2)	29.3 (84.7)	25.0 (77.0)	21.7 (71.1)	16.7 (62.1)	25.1 (77.1)
Daily mean °C (°F)	10.5 (50.9)	13.1 (55.6)	16.9 (62.4)	21.5 (70.7)	24.1 (75.4)	25.4 (77.7)	25.8 (78.4)	25.4 (77.7)	23.6 (74.5)	20.0 (68.0)	16.1 (61.0)	11.8 (53.2)	19.5 (67.1)
Mean daily minimum °C (°F)	7.7 (45.9)	9.5 (49.1)	12.8 (55.0)	16.8 (62.2)	19.6 (67.3)	21.8 (71.2)	22.4 (72.3)	21.8 (71.2)	20.0 (68.0)	16.9 (62.4)	12.8 (55.0)	8.8 (47.8)	15.9 (60.6)
Record low °C (°F)	−2.0 (28.4)	0.6 (33.1)	2.2 (36.0)	6.8 (44.2)	10.4 (50.7)	15.0 (59.0)	16.4 (61.5)	16.2 (61.2)	10.3 (50.5)	7.2 (45.0)	2.5 (36.5)	−1.4 (29.5)	−2.0 (28.4)
Average precipitation mm (inches)	28.3 (1.11)	19.3 (0.76)	34.3 (1.35)	56.5 (2.22)	147.0 (5.79)	238.4 (9.39)	224.2 (8.83)	168.8 (6.65)	101.9 (4.01)	76.5 (3.01)	31.8 (1.25)	20.1 (0.79)	1,147.1 (45.16)
Average precipitation days (≥ 0.1 mm)	11.6	9.4	10.5	11.0	13.5	17.0	17.3	16.0	11.4	12.4	8.1	8.4	146.6
Average snowy days	0.3	0.1	0	0	0	0	0	0	0	0	0	0.2	0.6
Average relative humidity (%)	81	76	73	71	74	81	83	82	81	83	82	81	79
Mean monthly sunshine hours	63.3	89.4	113.6	158.0	170.8	143.1	162.6	181.1	150.6	106.9	116.7	81.4	1,537.5
Percentage possible sunshine	19	28	30	41	41	35	39	45	41	30	36	25	34
Source: China Meteorological Administration

== Administrative divisions ==
Longlin County is divided into 6 towns and 10 townships. The county government is seated in the town of Xinzhou (新州镇).

The county's 6 towns are Xinzhou, Yacha (桠杈镇), Tianshengqiao (天生桥镇), Pingban (平班镇), De'e (德峨镇), and Longhuo (隆或镇).

The county's 10 townships are Shali Township (沙梨乡), Zhebao Township (者保乡), Zhelang Township (者浪乡), Gebu Township (革步乡), Jinzhongshan Township (金钟山乡), Zhuchang Township (猪场乡), Shechang Township (蛇场乡), Kechang Township (克长乡), Yancha Township (岩茶乡), and Jieting Township (介廷乡).

== Demographics ==
=== Vital statistics ===
As of 2010, the county had a crude birth rate of 20.04 per 1,000, and a crude death rate of 5.37 per 1,000, giving the county a rate of natural increase of 14.67 per 1,000.

=== Ethnic groups ===
Ethnic groups of Longlin County
Ethnic group	1995 Population	2019 Population
Zhuang	182,654 (53.74%)	217,140 (49.59%)
Miao	80,855 (23.79%)	126,044 (28.78%)
Han	70,720 (20.81%)	85,435 (19.50%)
Yi	3,152 (0.93%)	5,281 (1.20%)
Gelao	2,380 (0.7%)	3,796 (0.87%)

==== Zhuang people ====
The Zhuang people of Longlin have various cultural similarities with the Yue people who historically inhabited the area, including the use of bronze drums, as well as various autonyms. The towns of Xinzhou, Tianshengqiao, and Pingban, as well as Zhebao Township and Gebu Township all have significant Zhuang populations.

==== Miao people ====
The county is home to six different groups of Miao people:

- Lopsided Miao (Chinese: 偏苗; pinyin: Piān Miáo), whose autonyms are Meng Sha (孟沙) and Meng Xia (孟夏)
- Red Head Miao (红头苗; Hóngtóu Miáo), whose autonyms are Meng Lin (孟林), Meng Lun (孟论), Meng Ling (孟令), or Shou Lun (受论)
- Clear Water Miao (清水苗; Qīngshuǐ Miáo), whose autonym is Meng Pu (蒙瀑)
- White Miao (白苗; Bái Miáo), whose autonym is Meng Lou (孟漏)
- Flower Miao (花苗; Huā Miáo), whose autonym is Meng Zou (孟邹)
- Vegetable Miao (素苗; Sù Miáo), also known in Chinese as the Ginger Planing Miao (栽姜苗; Zāi Jiāng Miáo), the Zai River Miao (哉江苗; Zāi Jiāng Miáo), and the Zai Village Miao (哉庄苗; Zāi Zhuāng Miáo), and whose autonyms are Meng Jia Ka (孟加卡) and Meng Bai (孟拜)

Despite these different groups within the Miao populations of Longlin, all groups share similar ethnic origins. The Miao People of Longlin County are believed to be native to Hubei and Hunan who migrated southwest towards Guizhou and Yunnan, and later arrived in the region during the late Ming dynasty and early Qing dynasty. The probably reason for this migration appears connected to the Qing suppression of Miao uprisings in Guizhou and Xiangxi. The Miao People of Longlin County have many cultural similarities to Miao populations found in Guizhou, including shared folklore, linguistic dialects, naming conventions, toponymy, rituals, and celebrations.

The towns of Xinzhou and De'e, as well as the townships of Zhuchang Township, Shechang Township, and Kechang Township all have significant Miao populations. The former townships of Kechang, Changfa, and Changme also have considerable Miao populations.

==== Yi people ====
Longlin is home to a considerable amount of Yi (autonym: ŋo³³pʰu²¹), who historically lived in western Yunnan. Historical documents from the Nanzhao State suggest that certain Yi populations left Yunnan to avoid inter-tribal violence. Considerable Yi populations live in Xinzhou, De'e, and Zhuchang Township. Within De'e, Yi people are concentrated in Agao (阿稿), Nadi (那地), Nongbao (弄保), Tangshi (塘石), and 10 other villages. Yi are also found scattered across various villages in Yancha Township, Zhelang Township, and the former townships of Changfa and Kechang.

==== Gelao people ====
The county's Gelao people moved to the area from Guizhou during the early Qing dynasty, with local legends suggesting that the reason for this migration could have been conflict or famine.

In May 1990, a group of people known as the Lai (徕), who moved to the area from Guizhou during the early Ming dynasty, were determined to be part of the Gelao people by the county government after a five-day hearing on the matter. When the change was made in 1990, 978 people who were formerly classified as Lai in ethnicity were re-designated Gelao in ethnicity.

The county's Gelao people are largely found in De'e, Kechang Township, Zhelang Township, Yancha Township, and Shechang Township. The villages of Sanchong (三冲) and Moji (么基) have particularly large Gelao populations.

==== Han Chinese ====
The first migration of Han Chinese to the area took place shortly after the Song dynasty, and a document from 1673 suggests more than 10 Han families lived in area at the time. Areas with large Han populations are Xinzhou, Yacha, Longhuo, Tianshengqiao, Yancha Township, Jieting Township, Shechang Township, Kechang Township, Zhebao Township, and Jinzhongshan Township.

==== Unrecognized groups ====
The autonomous county is home to some Bolyu people, an unrecognized ethnic minority. The Bolyu mostly live in the northern portion of the autonomous county, alongside local Miao populations.

Some Longjia people also live in the northern part of the county.

== Economy ==
As of 2019, the county's primary sector accounts for 26.1% of the economy, the secondary sector accounts for 19.5%, and the tertiary sector accounts for 54.4%.

As of 2019, the disposable income of the county's urban residents averages 32,508 Yuan, and the disposable income of the county's rural residents averages 9,972 Yuan.

== Culture ==
Each year, at the beginning of the lunar new year, a festival in the village of De'e is held, featuring the music and dance of the various ethnic groups who live in the area. Each ethnic group also has its own traditions to celebrate the lunar new year, some of which are shared across multiple different groups.

The county's different peoples also have festivals unique to their own ethnicity, as well as festivals shared across multiple different ethnicities, such as the Dragon Boat Festival and the Double Third Festival.

== Transportation ==
National Highway 324 runs through the county.

== See also ==
- De'e
