= Martha Wangari Wanjira =

Kenyan politician

Member of the National Assembly
- Incumbent
- Assumed office 2017
- Constituency: Gilgil Constituency

Personal details
- Born: Martha Wangarì Wanjìra
- Party: United Democratic Alliance (2022)
- Other political affiliations: Jubilee Party (2017)
- Education: University of Nairobi

Martha Wangarì Wanjìra is a Kenyan politician from the United Democratic Alliance. She represents the Gilgil Constituency in the National Assembly.

== Education ==
Martha received her early education at Kahuhia Girls High School, where she completed her Kenya Certificate of Secondary Education (KCSE) in 2001. She later joined the University of Nairobi, graduating in 2007 with a Bachelor of Science degree in Statistics. In 2011, she furthered her studies at Africa Nazarene University, earning a Postgraduate Diploma in Environmental Impact Analysis (EIA).

== Career ==
Martha began her public engagement in 2007 as a founder member, community mobilizer, and strategist with the Kibaki Tena Secretariat. In 2010, she became a founder member and National Treasurer of the United Democratic Forum Party (UDF), a role she held until 2013. Her political career advanced when she joined the Parliament of Kenya as a Nominated Member of the Senate from 2013 to 2017. She was later elected to the National Assembly, serving as a Member of Parliament from 2017 to 2022.

She was first elected in the 2017 Kenyan general election for the Jubilee Party and in 2013 she joined the Senate.

In 2022 she the single member constituency representatives for Gilgil. Other women in a similar position were Charity Kathambi Chepkwony for Njoro Constituency, Jayne Kihara for Naivasha Constituency and Irene Mrembo Njoki for Bahati Constituency.

== See also ==
- 12th Parliament of Kenya
- 13th Parliament of Kenya
