= Njenga =

Njenga is a name of Kenyan origin that is derived from Kikuyu tribe with the meaning being "Party". It is an alternative . Njenga is also a Kikuyu name for boys born during harvest season.

- Njenga Karume (1929–2012), Kenyan politician and businessman
- Daniel Njenga (born 1976), Kenyan marathon runner and two-time Tokyo Marathon champion
- John Njenga (1928–2018), Kenyan former archbishop
- John Michael Njenga Mututho, Kenyan politician for the Kenya African National Union

== See also ==
- Mukuru kwa Njenga, slum area in Nairobi, Kenya
