= Naivasha Constituency =

Constituency in Nakuru County

Naivasha
- constituency for the Parliament of Kenya
- Naivasha Constituency within Nakuru County

- Nakuru County within Kenya
- County: Nakuru
- Population: 355,383
- Area: 1,958 km^{2} (756.0 sq mi)

Current constituency
- Number of members: 1
- Party: UDA
- Member of Parliament: Jayne Wanjiru Njeri Kihara
- Wards: 8

Naivasha Constituency is an electoral constituency in Kenya. It is one of eleven constituencies in Nakuru County. The constituency was established for the 1997 elections.

== Members of Parliament ==
Elections	MP	Party	Notes
1997	Paul Samuel Kihara	DP	
2002	Paul Samuel Kihara	NARC	Kihara died in 2003, resulting in by-elections
2003	Jayne Wanjiru Kihara	NARC	By-elections
2007	John Michael Njenga Mututho	KANU	
2012	John Karanja Kihagi	TNA	
2017	Jayne Wanjiru Kihara	JP	
2022	Jayne Wanjiru Kihara	UDA	

== Locations and wards ==
=== Locations ===
Location	Population*
Gilgil	49,773
Hell's Gate	52,641
Kiambogo	29,201
Karunga	21,044
Longonot	32,594
Malewa	16,114
Miellla	14,232
Miti Mingi	16,614
Moindabi	6,379
Naivasha East	27,479
Naivasha Town	47,277
Ndabibi	4,602
Total	x
1999 census.

=== Wards ===
Ward	Registered Voters	Local Authority
Biashara	7,680	Naivasha municipality
Gilgil	16,207	Nakuru County
Hells Gate	6,521	Naivasha municipality
Kiambogo	8,789	Nakuru County
Lake View	5,178	Naivasha municipality
Longonot	8,203	Nakuru County
Maiellla	3,901	Nakuru County
Malewa East	3,873	Naivasha municipality
Malewa West	3,839	Naivasha municipality
Maraigishu	5,320	Naivasha municipality
Miti Mingi	4,566	Nakuru County
Murindati	6,299	Nakuru County
Mwiciringiri	2,063	Naivasha municipality
Naivasha East	3,065	Naivasha municipality
Ndabibi	4,153	Nakuru County
Olkaria	11,138	Naivasha municipality
Viwanda	3,226	Naivasha municipality
Total	104,021	
*September 2005.

== See also ==
- Nakuru Town West Constituency
- Nakuru Town East Constituency
- Kuresoi South Constituency
- Kuresoi North Constituency
- Molo Constituency
- Rongai Constituency
- Subukia Constituency
- Njoro Constituency
- Gilgil Constituency
- Bahati Constituency
