= List of Kamen Rider Fourze episodes =

This is a list of episodes of the 2011–2012 Kamen Rider series Kamen Rider Fourze. Each episode title consists of four kanji that are separated from each other but can be read as a full statement.

== Episodes ==
No.	Title	Directed by	Written by	Original release date
1	"Youth-Ful Trans-Formation"; Transliteration: "Sei Shun Hen Shin" (Japanese: 青・春・変・身)	Koichi Sakamoto	Kazuki Nakashima	September 4, 2011
On his first day at Amanogawa High School (AGHS), Gentaro Kisaragi reunites with his childhood friend and fellow student Yuki Jojima before attempting to befriend her friend Kengo Utahoshi, who refuses. During lunch, Gentaro encounters social butterfly JK but runs afoul of head cheerleader and queen bee, Miu Kazashiro, and football team captain Shun Daimonji. When a monster called the Orion Zodiarts suddenly attacks the school, Gentaro tries to fight it until Kengo arrives in an exo-suit called the Powerdizer. However, he is unable to withstand the physical strain of using it due in part to his poor health and fails to stop the monster from escaping. Kengo and Yuki use a hidden locker to regroup at the Rabbit Hatch lunar base and retrieve the Fourze Driver device, but Gentaro follows them and takes it for himself. Learning that Orion has returned and with Kengo unable to fight back, Yuki helps Gentaro transform into an armored form called Fourze and use the driver's accompanying Astroswitches to defeat the monster. Subsequently, Kengo arrives in the Powerdizer to take the driver back. Meanwhile, a red-eyed man grows upset over Fourze being at his school.
2	"Space Is Amaz-Ing"; Transliteration: "U Chū Jō Tō" (Japanese: 宇・宙・上・等)	Koichi Sakamoto	Kazuki Nakashima	September 11, 2011
Seventeen years prior, a red-eyed man stole Zodiarts Switches from the Rabbit Hatch and destroyed it, leaving Kengo's father Rokuro for dead. In the present, Orion escapes while Kengo takes the driver from Gentaro, explaining that Zodiarts are humans who use Zodiarts Switches to become monsters and Gentaro failed to deactivate Orion's. As the pair separately vow to find Orion, a mysterious figure finds Orion's missing switch and returns it to him. The next day, Yuki explains the Rabbit Hatch's history and Rokuro's death to Gentaro. He offers to help Kengo before receiving a call from goth student Tomoko Nozama regarding Orion. Gentaro and Yuki meet with Tomoko, who reveals Orion is Shun's teammate Toshiya Miura. Gentaro finds him attacking Shun and tries to talk him down. Refusing to listen, Miura uses his switch in its "Last One" mode, which transfers his mind to his monstrous form. As Shun is evacuated, Kengo arrives to return the driver to Gentaro, who eventually defeats Miura, deactivates his switch, and befriends him. Afterward, Tomoko calls Gentaro a "Kamen Rider" after an internet-based urban legend. This inspires Gentaro to establish the Kamen Rider Club, with himself, Yuki, and Kengo as its first members.
3	"Queen E-Lec-Tion"; Transliteration: "Jo Ō Sen Kyo" (Japanese: 女・王・選・挙)	Koichi Sakamoto	Kazuki Nakashima	September 18, 2011
After testing a new Astroswitch that Kengo created, Gentaro and Yuki find AGHS' students preparing for the annual Queen Festival, a contest that Miu always wins. Gentaro makes a bet with her: if she loses this year, she will befriend him. Otherwise, he will transfer out. After she agrees, he looks for someone to compete against her. In the process, he re-encounters JK, who reluctantly befriends him. With JK's help, Gentaro convinces fellow student Reiko Hirota to enter the contest, but she is attacked by an unseen force. Gentaro helps her escape before exposing the culprit as the Chameleon Zodiarts. However, the Scorpion Zodiarts intervenes, overpowering him while Kengo persuades JK to not reveal Gentaro's secret identity. As Scorpion retreats, Kengo believes Gentaro lost because of the new Astroswitch, but Gentaro disagrees. With Reiko unwilling to enter the contest, Gentaro convinces Yuki to do so. The next day, Miu outshines Yuki until someone uploads a video compilation revealing Miu's apparent disgust towards her fellow students. Suddenly, cheerleader Tamae Sakuma is seemingly attacked by Chameleon and flees. The monster tries to attack Miu, but Gentaro uses the new Astroswitch to defeat Chameleon, who retreats while the student body turns against Miu.
4	"Trans-Formation Se-Cret"; Transliteration: "Hen Gen An Yaku" (Japanese: 変・幻・暗・躍)	Koichi Sakamoto	Kazuki Nakashima	September 25, 2011
As Gentaro realizes Chameleon orchestrated Miu's humiliation, a pleased Tamae watches from afar, holding a Zodiarts Switch. The next day, Kengo theorizes Chameleon is one Miu's fellow cheerleaders as they stand to benefit the most from Miu's loss in the contest before reviewing footage captured by a support robot he built to confirm. Meanwhile, Tamae tries to convince Miu to drop out, but Miu refuses. Concurrently, Gentaro seeks out JK for information before locating Miu to encourage her not to quit. Though Chameleon attacks them, Gentaro fights back before Kengo arrives to expose Tamae's identity. Jealous of Miu's winning streak, Tamae reveals Scorpion gave her the Zodiarts Switch to help her win before injuring Miu. Gentaro tries to stop Tamae, but Scorpion helps her escape. The next day, Tamae prepares for the contest's finals until Miu outshines her with a speech revealing her true feelings towards the student body. As she befriends Gentaro and regains the student body's adoration, Tamae attacks Miu, but Gentaro defeats her and deactivates her switch. Afterward, Gentaro tells Miu about the Kamen Rider Club to maintain his place at AGHS, during which she names herself club president.
5	"Friend-Ship Two-Faced"; Transliteration: "Yū Jō Hyō Ri" (Japanese: 友・情・表・裏)	Hidenori Ishida	Kazuki Nakashima	October 2, 2011
JK invites Gentaro to a party, but Gentaro declines, feeling that they are not friends yet. Meanwhile, Scorpion gives a Zodiarts Switch to Fumihiro Nitta, a student and member of AGHS' fencing team, to help him seek revenge. As Kengo invents a new, more powerful Astroswitch, the Elek Switch, to help Gentaro fight Scorpion, JK pesters Gentaro over attending his party until Nitta arrives and transforms into the Unicorn Zodiarts to confront JK. Gentaro uses the Elek Switch to fight Nitta until he is incapacitated by its increased power, allowing Nitta to flee. Regrouping at the Rabbit Hatch, Kengo berates Miu for not contributing to the Kamen Rider Club while Yuki discovers Nitta's identity and that he shares a class with JK. Concurrently, Gentaro attends JK's party and officially befriends him before Nitta arrives to resume his attack. Gentaro fights him once more, but Nitta uses his fencing training to overwhelm Gentaro. When Gentaro tries to use the Elek Switch, he fails to find it, unaware that JK had two associates pickpocket it from him and that he looks down on the idea of friendship.
6	"Blitz-Krieg Only Way"; Transliteration: "Den Geki Ichi Zu" (Japanese: 電・撃・一・途)	Hidenori Ishida	Kazuki Nakashima	October 9, 2011
After defeating Gentaro, Nitta leaves to find JK. As Gentaro leaves to find the Elek Switch, Scorpion, having watched the fight, meets with the red-eyed man to discuss Nitta and Fourze's fight. The next day, Gentaro gains JK's help in his search, but they are confronted by Nitta, who reveals JK manipulated him into serving as a human shield against bullies and cost him the chance to compete in a fencing tournament. As Nitta and Gentaro fight, JK tries to flee, but trips and briefly loses the Elek Switch. Exposed, he reveals he manipulated Gentaro into distracting Nitta. Taking advantage of Gentaro's shock over the betrayal, Nitta defeats him and kidnaps JK. Despite what happened, Gentaro vows to save JK. Concurrently, Nitta allows JK to call someone for help, but JK worries his associates will refuse. Before Nitta can kill JK, Yuki helps Gentaro find them. An angered Nitta fights him, but JK returns the Elek Switch to Gentaro, who uses it to defeat Nitta before deactivating his Zodiarts Switch. Afterward, Gentaro inducts JK into the Kamen Rider Club while the red-eyed man tells Scorpion to continue observing Fourze.
7	"The King, The Jerk"; Transliteration: "Ō Sama Ya Rō" (Japanese: 王・様・野・郎)	Takayuki Shibasaki	Riku Sanjo	October 16, 2011
Amidst the unveiling of a monument in the AGHS football team's honor, Shun becomes upset over Miu spending time with Gentaro. Noticing this, Shun's no-nonsense father Takato advises him to focus on himself and his achievements. Meanwhile, Gentaro, Yuki, and Kengo are forced to attend a Sunday remedial class, which a horrified JK reveals is usually reserved for AGHS' worst students. On the day of the class, the trio are unexpectedly joined by Tomoko and Shun, with the latter eventually revealing he needs to pass the class to stay on the football team. Meanwhile, Miu and JK witness the Hound Zodiarts going on a rampage. They call Kengo, who is forced to leave alone due to Shun stopping Gentaro from doing so. Using the Powerdizer, Kengo fights Hound before it escapes. Upon his return, Kengo finds Shun convincing the teacher, Takashi Satake, to require anyone who fails the exit exam to retake the class until they pass. Concurrently, JK tries to uncover Hound's identity, but the monster attacks him. Gentaro and Yuki escape to stop Hound, but Shun interferes, revealing he intends to get Gentaro expelled for ruining his control over the school.
8	"Iron Knight's Coop-Eration"; Transliteration: "Tek Ki Ren Kei" (Japanese: 鉄・騎・連・携)	Takayuki Shibasaki	Riku Sanjo	October 23, 2011
Taking advantage of Shun's interference, Hound attacks him and Gentaro. However, Gentaro overpowers the monster until Scorpion arrives to help Hound escape. Following this, Gentaro eventually confronts Shun over his role in their fellow students turning into Zodiarts before Gentaro is called away due to Hound's return. Scorpion arrives to help Hound overpower Gentaro until Miu uses the Powerdizer to fend off the pair. As an exhausted Miu is taken to the nurse's office, Shun reconciles with Gentaro, revealing that he has been forcing himself to live by his father's high standards. JK arrives soon after to reveal he discovered Hound is Takashi's son Teruhiko. Leading the group in confronting him, Teruhiko reveals he despises being a model student and leads a double life as a delinquent to spite Takashi before escaping. After telling Takato that he should be allowed to live his own life, Shun joins Gentaro in pursuing Teruhiko. Despite Scorpion's intervention, Shun successfully uses the Powerdizer to help Gentaro repel the monster before defeating Teruhiko. Afterward, Gentaro deactivates his switch, the Satakes reconcile, Miu welcomes Shun to the Kamen Rider Club, and Gentaro's group pass Takashi's class.
9	"The Witch Awa-Kens"; Transliteration: "Ma Jo Kaku Sei" (Japanese: 魔・女・覚・醒)	Satoshi Morota	Riku Sanjo	October 30, 2011
As Gentaro tries to befriend Tomoko, she is approached by other goth students calling themselves the "Lunar Witches". Their leader, Ritsuko Usaka, threatens to curse Gentaro if he keeps associating with Tomoko, their newest member. While helping Gentaro and Yuki investigate the Lunar Witches, Kengo realizes Tomoko possesses uncanny abilities after she detects his newly developed Fire Switch. When the Lunar Witches attack the AGHS swim team, Gentaro and Kengo arrive to stop them before the group disappear. Later that night, JK helps Gentaro find Tomoko, who reveals she always felt that she did not belong on Earth due to her unorthodox sense of thinking and dreamt of traveling to the moon. After meeting Ritsuko, she believes she finally has someone to connect with. The Lunar Witches arrive, telling Tomoko she is now a full member and can perform magic. The next day, the Lunar Witches attack the football team but the Kamen Rider Club arrive to stop them, during which Kengo reveals the witches' magic is actually the work of the Altar Zodiarts. Exposed, the monster attacks Gentaro, during which Tomoko realizes it is Ritsuko. Noticing Tomoko's dismay over Ritsuko's deception, Scorpion approaches her, offering a Zodiarts Switch.
10	"Moon-Light Rum-Ble"; Transliteration: "Gek Ka Geki Totsu" (Japanese: 月・下・激・突)	Satoshi Morota	Riku Sanjo	November 13, 2011
Ritsuko overpowers Gentaro before leaving, warning him to stop interfering. He and Kengo urge Tomoko not to follow her, but she refuses to listen. While regrouping, the Kamen Rider Club deduce Ritsuko's occultist beliefs are fueling her powers. Wishing to learn more about Tomoko, Gentaro and Yuki eventually locate her, learning that she desires to change herself in the process. Tomoko reiterates her dream, still believing Ritsuko can help her achieve it. An annoyed Gentaro takes her to the Rabbit Hatch to make her experience the moon's emptiness before telling her that she can never be truly alone because everyone has quirks. Overcome with emotion, Tomoko reveals Ritsuko plans to burn down AGHS. Confronting the Lunar Witches, Tomoko pretends to betray the Kamen Rider Club in a failed attempt to steal Ritsuko's staff. Ritsuko tries to kill her, but Gentaro rescues and befriends Tomoko while Shun severs the Lunar Witches' connection to Ritsuko's powers and destroys her staff. On Tomoko's advice, Gentaro uses the Fire Switch to defeat Ritsuko. Afterward, Tomoko joins the Kamen Rider Club and throws away her Zodiarts Switch.
11	"Dis-Appearing Moon-Door"; Transliteration: "Shō Shitsu Tsuki To" (Japanese: 消・失・月・戸)	Ryuta Tasaki	Kazuki Nakashima	November 20, 2011
One year prior, Kengo received an Astroswitch and threw it into a locker, inadvertently turning it into a wormhole to the Rabbit Hatch. In the present, a teacher named Chuta Ohsugi nearly discovers the locker until Yuki and Shun distract him, claiming it belongs to another teacher, Sarina Sonoda. Later, Gentaro and Yuki visit a JAXA center, where they learn AGHS was founded by its chairman and a former astronaut named Mitsuaki Gamou before they are attacked by Hiroki Makise, the president of AGHS' astronomy club who is obsessed with Yuki and has become the Pyxis Zodiarts to seek revenge on her for not joining his club. Makise subsequently overpowers Gentaro with his redirection and tracking powers before escaping. Following this, Kengo calls Gentaro saying he is trapped in the Rabbit Hatch. Realize their locker is gone, the Kamen Rider Club search for it. When Yuki learns Ohsugi seemingly gave it to a waste management company, she is forced to ask Makise for help. He agrees and they successfully locate the locker before he betrays her, saying he is not interested in her anymore. Gentaro arrives, but Makise tricks him into destroying the locker.
12	"Mis-Sion Ken's Life"; Transliteration: "Shi Mei Ken Mei" (Japanese: 使・命・賢・命)	Ryuta Tasaki	Kazuki Nakashima	November 27, 2011
As Gentaro attempts to save the locker, Makise gloats over him, discouraging further retaliation before leaving to enact another plan. Concurrently, a furious Kengo berates the Kamen Rider Club for leaving him to die alone, believing its creation was a bad idea, while a guilt-ridden Yuki contacts Gamou, hoping he can use his resources to send her to the moon and intending to reveal her involvement with Fourze, until Miu stops her. As Tomoko leaves to investigate a hunch, JK reveals to the Kamen Rider Club that Makise intends to kill every girl who rejected him. Mobilizing to stop him, Gentaro fends off Scorpion while Miu and Shun rescue Makise's captives. Watching everything from the Rabbit Hatch, Kengo realizes stopping the Zodiarts is not his sole mission anymore and advises Gentaro on how to defeat Makise. As Gentaro deactivates the Zodiarts switch and Makise is chased by his former captives, Tomoko confirms Gentaro destroyed a decoy locker and Ohsugi claimed the real one out of his secret love for Sonoda. Upon re-securing the locker, the Kamen Rider Club reunite with Kengo, who acknowledges their existence and accepts Gentaro's friendship.
13	"School Re-Jec-Tion"; Transliteration: "Gak Kō Kyo Zetsu" (Japanese: 学・校・拒・絶)	Hidenori Ishida	Riku Sanjo	December 4, 2011
After re-securing the locker portal, the Kamen Rider Club learn an angry mob of protestors have organized at AGHS over monster sightings. As Principal Kouhei Hayami convinces them to stand down with a reassuring speech, Tomoko remembers Scorpion used similar wording during their encounter while Gentaro becomes inspired to rehabilitate former Zodiarts. Similarly inspired, Shun tries to help Miura with help from Miura's girlfriend and photography club member Mari Yamamoto. Upon learning Miura has not attended school in some time, Gentaro tries to convince him to come back. Though Miura reveals he has let go of his grudge against Shun, he refuses for a separate reason and meets with Scorpion. Having followed him, Gentaro fights the monster while the other club members evacuate Miura. However, Scorpion overpowers him before escaping. Following this, Miura eventually reveals he is suffering from withdrawal before fleeing as well. Taking notice of this, Sonoda transforms into the Scorpion Zodiarts and offers him a new Zodiarts Switch.
14	"Sting-Er At-Tack"; Transliteration: "Doku Bari Mō Shū" (Japanese: 毒・針・猛・襲)	Hidenori Ishida	Riku Sanjo	December 11, 2011
Sonoda attempts to coerce Miura into reassuming his Zodiarts form. However, Gentaro arrives, forcing her to leave, telling Miura to meet where she gave him his original switch. As Gentaro tries to reason with Miura, Sonoda meets with Gamou, who grants her a new power in case Fourze interferes again. The next day, Sonoda secretly envenoms Gentaro, hoping he will die for interfering with her group, the Horoscopes. Despite being weakened, Gentaro warns the Kamen Rider Club. Kengo deduces the Horoscopes are creating the Zodiarts while Gentaro suddenly leaves and enlists JK's help in locating Miura so he can use Mari's photo album to convince him not to become a Zodiarts again. After Miura refuses her and Gentaro uses a new Astroswitch to cure himself, Sonoda transforms into a stronger form, Scorpion Nova, but Gentaro defeats her. Before the Kamen Rider Club can learn her identity, Hayami secretly transforms into the Libra Zodiarts and uses his illusionary powers to help her escape. As Gamou punishes Sonoda by taking her Zodiarts Switch, Miura returns to AGHS and joins Mari in the photography club.
15	"Holy Night Cho-Rus"; Transliteration: "Sei Ya Gas Shō" (Japanese: 聖・夜・合・唱)	Takayuki Shibasaki	Riku Sanjo	December 18, 2011
Yuki joins the AGHS glee club in helping them prepare for their annual Christmas pageant for a local kindergarten. Gentaro tries to befriend them, but they refuse before Kengo calls him away due to a Zodiarts attack. Gentaro subsequently fights the Perseus Zodiarts, who possesses a petrifying touch, before the monster suddenly retreats. Later, Gentaro encounters the president of AGHS' art club, Soshi Motoyama, before meeting with Yuki and the glee club to help them practice. However, Soshi grows angry over it and complains to the glee club president and his friend, Junta Abe. Following this, Gentaro meets with Kengo and JK to discuss Perseus' identity, during which he realizes it is Soshi, who is attacking anyone who disrupts his concentration, and Yuki is danger. Upon finding Soshi attacking her, Gentaro and Kengo intervene, during which Soshi's Zodiarts Switch enters its Last One phase. Gentaro defeats him, but Soshi's monstrous form suddenly re-manifests before he can deactivate the Zodiarts Switch. Watching from afar, Hayami reiterates to Sonoda their goal of finding eight students who can evolve their Zodiarts forms past the Last One stage and join them and the Virgo and Leo Zodiarts in completing the Horoscopes' ranks.
16	"Right-Wrong Con-Flict"; Transliteration: "Sei Ja Kat Tō" (Japanese: 正・邪・葛・藤)	Takayuki Shibasaki	Riku Sanjo	December 25, 2011
Now that Soshi has unlocked his "Resurrection Star", Hayami confirms to Sonoda that he has the potential to evolve into a Horoscope. Gaining the power to fire petrification beams, Soshi overpowers Gentaro until the latter reminds him of his work by challenging him to a drawing contest. Despite winning, Soshi recognizes Gentaro put his heart into it. Hayami arrives to force Soshi into killing Gentaro and the glee club to complete his evolution, but Soshi sees the kindergartners emulating a painting he gave them last year, realizes he should not use his work to satisfy himself exclusively, befriends Gentaro, and loses his Resurrection Star. An angered Hayami brainwashes Soshi into attacking Gentaro, but another Kamen Rider arrives to fight Hayami. Taking advantage, Gentaro eventually defeats Soshi and successfully deactivates his switch, restoring Soshi's humanity while Hayami and the new Rider flee. Afterward, Soshi returns to painting while the Kamen Rider Club celebrate Christmas.
17	"Me-Teor Ar-Rival"; Transliteration: "Ryū Sei Tō Jō" (Japanese: 流・星・登・場)	Satoshi Morota	Kazuki Nakashima	January 8, 2012
As Kengo struggles to identify the new Rider and deduces their technology is unconnected to Rokuro's, a new transfer student named Ryusei Sakuta arrives at AGHS. Gentaro tries to befriend him before hearing rumors of a feline monster attacking students with good grades. While searching for clues, he encounters Kengo's academic rival Kimio Nonomura before witnessing the Lynx Zodiarts attack Kengo. Gentaro fights the monster until the bell rings, forcing everyone to retreat and return to their classes. Ryusei secretly follows the Kamen Rider Club as they return to the Rabbit Hatch to review the fight, during which Gentaro deduces Nonomura is the culprit. Ryusei reports back to Tachibana, his benefactor and the mysterious leader of the Anti-Zodiarts Union, with his findings. Tachibana orders him to continue observing the club, but Ryusei transforms into Kamen Rider Meteor to intervene during Gentaro and Nonomura's rematch. When Nonomura enters his Last One phase, Ryusei defends him from Gentaro, revealing the Horoscopes' plan to him along with his intention to determine if Nonomura will become the Aries Zodiarts.
18	"Gen/Ryu Show-Down"; Transliteration: "Gen Ryū Tai Ketsu" (Japanese: 弦・流・対・決)	Satoshi Morota	Kazuki Nakashima	January 15, 2012
In a flashback, Ryusei's friend Jiro ended up in a coma before Tachibana gave Ryusei the means to become Meteor. In the present, Ryusei fights Gentaro to protect Nonomura, only to be stopped by Tomoko and the arriving Kamen Rider Club, inadvertently allowing Nonomura to escape. Recognizing their solidarity, Ryusei leaves as well. Recovering Nonomura's human body, the club are shocked by Ryusei's sudden arrival. Under false pretenses, he asks to join them. Everyone agrees except for Gentaro, who knows Ryusei is lying. The next day, Gentaro defeats Nonomura, during which Ryusei hits him in anger. Realizing his mistake, he starts to apologize, but a pleased Gentaro praises him for his honesty. When Hayami and Sonoda, who regained her Zodiarts Switch to stop Meteor, arrive to seek revenge for Nonomura, the two Riders join forces to fend off the monsters and defeat Sonoda, though Hayami covers her escape before her identity is exposed once more. Afterward, Gamou re-confiscates Sonoda's switch and orders Virgo to banish her to the "Dark Nebula" for her repeated failures while Ryusei officially joins the Kamen Rider Club.
19	"Steel Dragon, No Equal"; Transliteration: "Kō Ryū Mu Sō" (Japanese: 鋼・竜・無・双)	Hidenori Ishida	Riku Sanjo	January 22, 2012
After seeing Ryusei join the Kamen Rider Club in testing the newly developed Magnet Switches without him, Kengo grows upset over being excluded, renounces them as friends, and storms off. He later meets old friend Rumi Egawa of AGHS' track and field team before her captain Jin Nomoto orders her to resume practicing and warns Kengo to stop associating with her. Meanwhile, Gentaro struggles to fight the Dragon Zodiarts, whose metallic body allows him to withstand Gentaro's attacks and was ordered by Hayami to kill the Riders. Gentaro tries to use the Magnet Switches, but fails to control their power. Nonetheless, Dragon is forced to flee. As the club regroup, Ryusei suggests combining the Magnet Switches into a "Magphone", but Kengo reveals he already did so before stating his belief that Ryusei is using Gentaro for dangerous reasons. Leaving once more, Kengo tries to help Rumi improve her running technique until Dragon attacks him, believing he is Meteor. Wishing to reconcile with Kengo, Gentaro takes the incomplete Magphone into battle. Despite receiving Ryusei's help however, Dragon overpowers them. Complicating matters, the Magphone suddenly flies off.
20	"Excel-Lent Magne-Tism"; Transliteration: "Chō Zetsu Ji Ryoku" (Japanese: 超・絶・磁・力)	Hidenori Ishida	Riku Sanjo	January 29, 2012
With the incomplete Magphone gone, Gentaro and Ryusei combine their powers to force Dragon into another retreat. After Ryusei leaves as well, Gentaro tries to apologize to Kengo, but he refuses to listen and leaves to advise Rumi. As Gentaro, Miu, JK, and Tomoko search for the Magphone, Yuki, Shun, and Ryusei attempt to convince Kengo to forgive Gentaro. Upon finding him, Ryusei is reminded of his past with Jiro and tells Kengo to not say anything he might regret. Meanwhile, Gentaro connects with Yuki's group, during which he sees Jin berating Rumi for accepting Kengo's help before Jin transforms into Dragon. Gentaro and an arriving Ryusei intervene to save Rumi and Kengo, but are temporarily overpowered until Miu's group return with the Magphone. Once Kengo completes it, Gentaro successfully uses it to defeat Jin before deactivating his switch. In response to this, an incensed Gamou orders Hayami to accelerate his search for the remaining Horoscopes.
21	"Gui-Dance Mis-Counseling"; Transliteration: "Shin Ro Go Dō" (Japanese: 進・路・誤・導)	Koichi Sakamoto	Kazuki Nakashima	February 5, 2012
As Gamou covers Sonoda's disappearance as a sabbatical, Hayami brings in a replacement teacher, aspiring kickboxer Haruka Utsugi. Meanwhile, with Gentaro, Kengo, and Yuki busy with career guidance sessions, Ryusei, Shun, Tomoko, and JK uncover footage of the Pegasus Zodiarts fighting Hayami over a stolen Zodiarts Switch. Ryusei soon joins the battle, forcing Hayami to retreat. As Gentaro arrives to help, Ryusei flees as well to protect his identity. During the fight, Gentaro notices Pegasus has a similar fighting style as Utsugi before the monster leaves, dropping a rakugo fan in the process. JK and Ryusei visit AGHS' rakugo club to find the fan's owner while Gentaro attempts to confirm whether Utsugi is Pegasus. He later meets with JK and Ryusei, who reveal the fan was in Utsugi's possession before Miu alerts them to Pegasus' return. Gentaro and Ryusei overpower the monster, but Virgo arrives to help Pegasus, who is seemingly confirmed to be Utsugi.
22	"True Self Rejec-Tion"; Transliteration: "Ba Kyaku Is Shū" (Japanese: 馬・脚・一・蹴)	Koichi Sakamoto	Kazuki Nakashima	February 12, 2012
Pegasus attacks Gentaro, claiming to be Utsugi, before Ryusei injures the monster, forcing Pegasus and Virgo to retreat. Later that night, Virgo tells an irate Hayami that Pegasus has the potential to become a Horoscope and Gamou wants him protected. The next day, the Kamen Rider Club meet with the rakugo club's president, Natsuji Kijima, who Ryusei notices has a similar injury as Pegasus. Meanwhile, Gentaro confronts Utsugi, hoping to talk her out of being a Zodiarts, but eventually realizes he was wrong before Ryusei informs the pair that he has discovered Kijima is Pegasus. The three join the Kamen Rider Club in confronting him, during which Kijima reveals he sought revenge on Utsugi for confiscating his fan by framing her for his crimes. Entering his Last One stage, he subsequently fights Gentaro while Ryusei is sidelined due to Tachibana's restrictions. Nonetheless, Gentaro defeats Kijima with his friends and Utsugi's help, only for Virgo to arrive and fuse Kijima's Zodiarts form with his human body, evolving him into the Cancer Zodiarts before taking him away. In light of the new threat, Gentaro joins Utsugi's newly formed kickboxing club to further his training.
23	"The Swan Un-Ion"; Transliteration: "Haku Chō Dō Mei" (Japanese: 白・鳥・同・盟)	Kyohei Yamaguchi	Keiichi Hasegawa	February 19, 2012
The Kamen Rider Club learn from a weak-willed student named Norio Eguchi that a new hero called Cygnus has emerged to help people and garnered a fan club called the Ugly Duckling Society. Suddenly, Kijima returns to seek revenge on the club for nearly defeating him. Gentaro fights him, but Kijima's new powers make him nearly invincible until Cygnus arrives to force him into a retreat. Gentaro tries to befriend Cygnus, but he leaves as well. As Kengo and Ryusei identify the new hero as a Zodiarts, Gentaro convinces the society's president Misa Toriizaki to allow his club to watch their next meeting. All throughout, Ryusei realizes it functions similarly to a cult that uses a point system to grade members' heroism and takes Tomoko away from the society, but the pair are attacked by Cygnus. Faking cowardice, Ryusei runs off to transform and fight back, but the monster uses Tomoko as a human shield. Unable to bring himself to hurt her, Ryusei receives an arriving Gentaro's help in rescuing her before resuming their fight.
24	"Hero-Ic De-Sire"; Transliteration: "Ei Yū Gan Bō" (Japanese: 英・雄・願・望)	Kyohei Yamaguchi	Keiichi Hasegawa	February 26, 2012
Cygnus reveals his intent to replace Gentaro as a hero before retreating. The next day, Tomoko berates Ryusei for seemingly abandoning her while they help the Kamen Rider Club confront Misa, who they believe is Cygnus. However, Misa claims everyone in the Ugly Duckling Society is Cygnus before having them thrown out. Eguchi breaks off from the society to tell the club Cygnus secretly attacks people and Misa is not the monster. Following this, the club formulate a plan to uncover Cygnus' identity, during which they discover Eguchi received a Zodiarts Switch, which caused him to manifest a split personality called Cygnus, who inhabits the Zodiarts body and has gradually been trying to replace him. With the club's help, Eguchi finds his courage, overcomes Cygnus' control, and befriends Gentaro, but Kijima kidnaps Eguchi and brings him to Misa's group, who force Eguchi to turn back into Cygnus. When the Kamen Rider Club arrive, the monster uses Misa to shield himself, though Gentaro uses a newly developed Astroswitch to separate them. Kijima intervenes, but Gentaro repels him while Ryusei defeats Cygnus and deactivates Eguchi's switch. Following this, the society disbands while Eguchi performs good deeds.
25	"Grad-Uation Trou-Bles"; Transliteration: "Sotsu Gyō Ushiro Gami" (Japanese: 卒・業・後・髪)	Satoshi Morota	Riku Sanjo	March 4, 2012
With graduation approaching, Shun attempts to ask Miu out to the upcoming prom, but she declines, her mind on other matters. While cheering him up, Gentaro finds third-year student and head of AGHS' newspaper Yayoi Tokuda harassing fellow third-years Ritsuko, Tamae, and Jin about their Zodiarts forms running amok again, to which they deny being involved. As Miu appoints Yuki her successor as the Kamen Rider Club's president, the group learn Chameleon has returned. After Gentaro and Ryusei defeat it however, it is replaced by a clump of hair before self-combusting. The group realize the culprit intends to disrupt the prom before confronting Tamae and Jin, believing they are lying about their involvement. Meanwhile, Shun opens up to Gentaro regarding his feelings for Miu. A touched Gentaro attempts to convince Miu to accept Shun's invitation until he is alerted to Dragon's return. After Gentaro eventually destroys the monster, its creator, the Coma Zodiarts, reveals herself. Creating a hair-based clone of Altar and joined by Kijima, the monsters overwhelm Gentaro. With Shun mounting a failed attempt at asking out Miu, who reveals she wants to attend the prom with Gentaro, JK pilots the Powerdizer to help Gentaro.
26	"Per-Fect Round Dance"; Transliteration: "Yū Shū Rin Bu" (Japanese: 有・終・輪・舞)	Satoshi Morota	Riku Sanjo	March 11, 2012
Miraculously, JK's reckless fighting style helps him destroy the Altar clone and force Coma and Kijima to escape. Following this, the Kamen Rider Club attempt to determine Coma's identity, though Gentaro wants to help fix Tamae, Jin, and Ritsuko's reputations before they graduate. Amidst this, Gentaro successfully convinces Miu to go with Shun, who later attacks Gentaro for seemingly stealing Miu from him. Meanwhile, the remaining club members learn Yayoi has incited an angry mob against the former Zodiarts while Ohsugi announces the prom and graduation will continue as planned. Eventually, the club learn Yayoi is Coma, who wishes to stop the events and stay at AGHS forever. As prom gets underway, Gentaro convinces his friends to attend with the former Zodiarts and protect it before attempting to talk Yayoi out of her plot, but she refuses. With Kijima's help, she overpowers Gentaro until Miu and Shun arrive to rally their friends and help Gentaro. Reinvigorated, he defeats Yayoi and deactivates her switch, but Kijima escapes. Afterward, Shun and Gentaro reconcile. The next day, Shun and Miu reveal they will be attending nearby colleges, allowing them to remain with the Kamen Rider Club.
27	"Trans-Formation De-Nied"; Transliteration: "Hen Shin Kyak Ka" (Japanese: 変・身・却・下)	Hidenori Ishida	Kazuki Nakashima	March 18, 2012
Amidst spring break, Kijima challenges Ryusei, who asks Tachibana for an upgrade to his Rider technology. However, he is forced to break off upon learning Kijima is stealing people's life-forces and putting them into comas to find someone who can make him laugh in exchange for a Zodiarts Switch. He later offers Ryusei a partnership between them, but Ryusei refuses. The pair fight until Kijima disappears to learn Ryusei's secret identity, which he hides from Gamou for future use. During a later confrontation, Ryusei fails to transform, allowing Kijima to grievously beat him until Gentaro and Tomoko arrive. While Gentaro fights Kijima, Ryusei learns from Tachibana that his secret identity has been compromised and that he has revoked access to his powers. Worsening matters, Kijima assumes a new form, Cancer Nova.
28	"Star-Storm Come-Back"; Transliteration: "Sei Ran Sai Ki" (Japanese: 星・嵐・再・起)	Hidenori Ishida	Kazuki Nakashima	March 25, 2012
Using his new form, Kijima overpowers Gentaro before stealing Ryusei's life-force and escaping with Virgo's help. Despite being weakened, Ryusei intends to face him alone. However, he learns Jiro has come down with a fever, leaving him conflicted. Having overheard, Gentaro offers to take Ryusei's place and put himself and their friends' life-forces at risk to save Ryusei's. Annoyed by the Kamen Rider Club's presence, Kijima offers to release them if Ryusei returns in a timely manner. After visiting the hospitalized Jiro, Ryusei is contacted by Tachibana, who gives him the chance to redeem himself and provides the upgrade he asked for. Ultimately, Ryusei opts to return to his friends. Upon his arrival, Kijima attacks him, but Ryusei reveals he allowed himself to be injured so Kijima will laugh at his misery, tricking him into releasing the stolen life-forces. As Gentaro battles an enraged Kijima, Tachibana gives Ryusei the upgrade, allowing him to enhance his Rider powers and defeat Kijima. Though an injured Kijima escapes, Hayami convinces Virgo to send him to the Dark Nebula before retrieving his Horoscope Switch. Afterward, Ryusei finds Jiro's health has improved before rejoining his friends.
29	"Jun-Ior Sil-Ence"; Transliteration: "Kō Hai Mu Gon" (Japanese: 後・輩・無・言)	Koichi Sakamoto	Keiichi Hasegawa	April 1, 2012
With spring break over, Gentaro celebrates becoming a third-year student and tries to befriend two first-years, Haru Kusao and Ran Kuroki. However, she declines. Complicating matters, Gentaro, Yuki, and Kengo learn Ohsugi has resolved to find out where they keep running off to. In response, Yuki considers adding new members to the Kamen Rider Club to help them outmaneuver Ohsugi before Miu and Shun alert the group to a Zodiarts sighting. Arriving on the scene, Gentaro fights the Musca Zodiarts, but Ran appears, saying he is fighting Haru. As Haru escapes, Gentaro offers to help her, but Ran refuses and storms off. The next day, while attempting to convince Haru to relinquish his Zodiarts Switch, she learns a teacher gave it to him. She confronts Gentaro in the faculty office, during which she unknowingly alerts Ohsugi to the Rabbit Hatch's existence while Yuki is calling Gentaro to tell him that Haru has transformed again. Ran finds Haru and tries to talk him down, but he refuses to listen, rapidly evolving in the process. As Ryusei, Hayami, and Gentaro join the fray, Ran stops Gentaro from defeating Haru. Meanwhile, Kengo is shocked to discover Ohsugi followed him to the Rabbit Hatch.
30	"Sen-Ior Futil-Ity"; Transliteration: "Sen Pai Mu Yō" (Japanese: 先・輩・無・用)	Koichi Sakamoto	Keiichi Hasegawa	April 8, 2012
Despite being saved by Ran, Haru knocks her down, revealing he wants to protect her instead before fleeing. Gentaro tries to help her, but she refuses and leaves to find Haru. Regrouping at the Rabbit Hatch, the Kamen Rider Club are forced to reveal the truth to Ohsugi, who vows to tell others and disband them. After restraining him, Gentaro leaves to find Ran, during which he learns why she distrusts upperclassmen. Elsewhere, Tachibana alerts Ryusei to a Zodiarts sighting at his old school, Subaruboshi High. Traveling there, he finds his old friends acting strangely before Hayami arrives to fight him. Meanwhile, Ohsugi escapes the Rabbit Hatch, but encounters Ran, who believes he gave Haru the Zodiarts Switch before Haru arrives to attack Ohsugi. The Kamen Rider Club soon arrive to save him, during which Gentaro befriends Ran before restraining Haru so he and Ran can reconcile. Once they do so, Gentaro defeats Haru and deactivates his switch. As Ran and Haru become provisional members of the Kamen Rider Club, Ohsugi agrees to keep their secret in exchange for becoming their academic advisor. Concurrently, Gamou meets with Hayami to discuss Aries' progress in subjugating Subaruboshi High.
31	"Plei-Ades King-Dom"; Transliteration: "Subaru Boshi Ō Koku" (Japanese: 昴・星・王・国)	Koichi Sakamoto	Riku Sanjo	April 15, 2012
As Ryusei and Yuki confirm that the Horoscopes recruited the transfer student who took his place at Subaruboshi High, Tatsumori Yamada, Kengo completes the most powerful Astroswitch yet, the Cosmic Switch, but it fails to work. Nonetheless, Gentaro asks Ohsugi to help the Kamen Rider Club infiltrate Subaruboshi via a test transfer. Upon their arrival, they are warned by Ryusei's friend Mei Shirakawa to leave before learning of Jiro, Yamada having become Aries, and that he is using his metabolism manipulation powers to force the students and faculty to do his bidding. Gentaro tries to fight him, but Yamada defeats him and puts most of the Kamen Rider Club to sleep. Following this, Ryusei secretly asks Yamada to help awaken Jiro from his coma. Yamada agrees in exchange for Ryusei killing Gentaro. Later that day, Gentaro fights Yamada again while Shun attempts to evacuate Subaruboshi. Suddenly, Ryusei attacks and mortally wounds Gentaro, causing Tachibana to revoke access to his powers and expose his identity. Before dying of his injuries, Gentaro expresses how proud he is of Ryusei for finally being honest with him and to have been able to help Jiro.
32	"Super Cos-Mic Sword"; Transliteration: "Chō U Chū Ken" (Japanese: 超・宇・宙・剣)	Koichi Sakamoto	Riku Sanjo	April 22, 2012
With Gentaro dead, Kengo and Shun confront Ryusei for his betrayal, but Shun succumbs to Yamada's powers while Tachibana rescues Kengo, who recovers Gentaro's body. After forcing Subaruboshi's students and faculty to prepare the Kamen Rider Club to be executed, Yamada travels to the hospital with Ryusei to revive Jiro. However, Jiro learns what Ryusei did and relapses, causing Ryusei to realize he truly wanted to befriend Gentaro and return to Subaruboshi to save the Kamen Rider Club despite lacking his powers. Meanwhile, Kengo attempts to resuscitate Gentaro, during which Tachibana reveals he was the one who gave Kengo the switch that connected AGHS to the Rabbit Hatch before helping Kengo find a message from Rokuro saying the power of friendship is the ability to do the impossible. With renewed hope, Kengo uses the Cosmic Switch to revive Gentaro, who soon intervenes in Ryusei's fight to save and befriend him. Gentaro then uses the Cosmic Switch to defeat Yamada, who is put into a coma while Virgo recovers his Horoscope Switch for Gamou. Afterward, Ryusei reports to the Kamen Rider Club that Jiro's health has improved while Kengo relays Tachibana's message of helping keep Ryusei's identity secret.
33	"Old City May-Hem"; Transliteration: "Ko To Sō Ran" (Japanese: 古・都・騒・乱)	Satoshi Morota	Kazuki Nakashima	April 29, 2012
As Ohsugi's class prepare for a field trip to Kyoto, Gentaro, Kengo, Yuki, and Ryusei are joined by classmate Yukina Takamura, who wants to be more than Gentaro's friend. Upon their arrival, Kengo breaks off to meet with a friend of Rokuro's, Professor Kuniteru Emoto, to learn more about cosmic energy. Emoto tells him about "The Hole", an atmospheric vortex of cosmic energy, and how there is one above AGHS and another above Kyoto, which he reveals was originally designed by its founders to utilize its energy via four altars at its cardinal points. Meanwhile, Yukina obsessively clings to Gentaro, going so far as to blackmail Yuki into helping her. While helping him fight Hayami, Ryusei notices an altar that had been destroyed recently before Gamou's bodyguard Kou Tatsugami arrives and transforms into the Leo Zodiarts to fend off the Riders so Hayami can destroy a second altar.
34	"Sky Hole Offense/Defense"; Transliteration: "Ten Ketsu Kō Bō" (Japanese: 天・穴・攻・防)	Satoshi Morota	Kazuki Nakashima	May 6, 2012
With Tatsugami's help, Hayami destroys the second altar before retreating. As Ryusei deduces their plot, he and Kengo compare notes and report their findings to the Kamen Rider Club, revealing that the Horoscopes are destroying the cardinal altars to negate "The Hole" above Kyoto so that the one above AGHS can gather more cosmic energy. The next day, the club split up to find and protect the remaining two altars despite Yukina's ongoing interference. Amidst this, Kengo sees Gamou with Emoto and Tatsugami, who nearly attacks him until Ryusei intervenes. Soon after, Kengo hears Gamou claim responsibility for killing Rokuro before Kengo and Ryusei find the third altar destroyed. Concurrently, Yukina reveals she knows Gentaro's secret identity and steals the Fourze Driver, hoping to make him retire. After stumbling onto Hayami while he is destroying the last altar, she realizes the error of her ways, returns the driver, and befriends Gentaro, who defeats Hayami. Despite his successes, Gamou intends to have Virgo banish Hayami to the Dark Nebula for his failures until Hayami suddenly unlocks the ability to directly identify people who can become Horoscopes and reveals Gamou will become the Sagittarius Zodiarts, causing Gamou to relent.
35	"Mon-Ster Broad-Cast"; Transliteration: "Kai Jin Hō Sō" (Japanese: 怪・人・放・送)	Katsuya Watanabe	Keiichi Hasegawa	May 13, 2012
Gentaro and Yuki learn a mysterious radio DJ called Gene has started a popular internet radio show, unaware that it is JK. Concurrently, JK reunites with an old friend, Tojiro Goto, who reveals he recently became the Capricorn Zodiarts and acquired music-based powers. Suddenly, the Kamen Rider Club find them, hoping to ask JK to help them meet Gene, only for Gentaro and Ryusei to fight Goto. Initially torn over who to help, JK fakes an accident to help Goto, who escapes with Hayami's help, while Gentaro finds that the Cosmic Switch has stopped working again. Nonetheless, he tells JK that he deduced what he did. JK reveals he wanted to become a singer as a child, but gave it up during middle school. Seeing that he can fulfill his dream, JK accepts Goto's help in improving his radio show's popularity until he learns Goto is brainwashing listeners. Forced to expose himself, JK confronts him, but Goto refuses to end the show before fighting the Riders again. As Goto is overpowered, JK reveals further that he wants to surpass his father, a once popular musician, and quits the Kamen Rider Club to pursue his dream, unexpectedly depowering the Cosmic Switch.
36	"Seri-Ous Last Song"; Transliteration: "Hon Ki Den Ka" (Japanese: 本・気・伝・歌)	Katsuya Watanabe	Keiichi Hasegawa	May 20, 2012
Ryusei holds off Goto while Gentaro pleads with JK to reconsider. However, he refuses before leaving with Goto, causing Gentaro to realize losing his friendship with JK disabled the Cosmic Switch. The next day, JK and Goto brainwash most of AGHS while announcing an upcoming concert they are holding, with the Riders and Horoscopes proving immune due to their powers while Miu and Shun did not hear the initial broadcast. As Gentaro leaves to find a solution, Ryusei and the college students attempt to find JK, but are attacked by Tatsugami, who hospitalizes Miu and Shun and forces Ryusei to retreat. On the day of the concert, Gentaro confronts JK, revealing he visited JK's father, who told Gentaro to remind JK of what his dream is really about. In the process, Gentaro breaks Goto's spell and regains JK's friendship before defeating Goto. Virgo retrieves Goto and confiscates his Horoscope Switch, but Gamou orders her to erase Goto's memory and release him since he confirmed the "Core Switch" is still active and somewhere in AGHS during his time with them. Afterward, JK ends his radio show, commenting on how he is reconciling with his father and the Kamen Rider Club.
37	"Star Group Selec-Tion"; Transliteration: "Sei To Sen Batsu" (Japanese: 星・徒・選・抜)	Hidenori Ishida	Riku Sanjo	May 27, 2012
While looking for Yuki, Gentaro encounters an American transfer student named Erin Suda, who he nearly befriends until Yuki arrives. The girls get into an argument before Erin storms off. Soon after, the pair learn that AGHS is holding its annual Astronaut Selection Exam, in which whoever passes will be enrolled in the Space International Development Agency. Gentaro, Yuki, Kengo, Ryusei, Tomoko, and Erin, among others, pass the initial round before being informed that they are to be split into teams before undergoing three trials. As the exam gets underway, Kengo's health problems resurface, but the Aquarius Zodiarts uses her healing powers on him before attacking the other participants. With Tomoko's help, Gentaro repels the monster, but learns that it is Erin. Later, while confronting and revealing his identity to her, Gentaro learns she intends to become an astronaut like her father and refuses to lose to someone like Yuki like he had. Unable to reach her, Gentaro convinces Erin to relinquish her Horoscope Switch if Yuki beats her in the exam. During the second trial, Yuki outshines Erin, who nearly attacks her before Gentaro intervenes. Amidst the subsequent fight, Erin claims Yuki cheated, stunning Gentaro.
38	"Win-Ner Deci-Sion"; Transliteration: "Shō Sha Ket Tei" (Japanese: 勝・者・決・定)	Hidenori Ishida	Riku Sanjo	June 3, 2012
Though Gentaro convinces Erin to relent, she is furious to learn that Yuki is allowed to participate in the final trial along with Kengo and student body president Yuta Sugiura. Gentaro promises Erin that he will investigate her claim, but when he tries to talk to Yuki about it, she refuses to elaborate. The next day, Erin attacks Yuki, but Gentaro arrives to reveal what Yuki did was mandated by the exam's judges. Dismayed over essentially helping Yuki win, Erin heals her and finishes the trial fairly. Afterward, Yuki accepts her apology and friendship. However, Erin tells Gentaro that they cannot be friends due to their allegiances and cares too much for her leader to betray him. Seeing no other choice, the pair engage each other in a duel, during which Gentaro discovers the secret to her powers and negates it before defeating her. She thanks him before Virgo takes Erin away to confiscate her Horoscope Switch and erase her memory. Afterward, Gentaro and Yuki befriend Erin anew while the Horoscopes recruit Sugiura.
39	"Cam-Pus Ordi-Nance"; Transliteration: "Gaku En Hat To" (Japanese: 学・園・法・度)	Satoshi Morota	Keiichi Hasegawa	June 10, 2012
Upon learning that Sugiura and the Student Council has established the Amanogawa Campus Bylaws to eliminate individuality, Gentaro, JK, and Ryusei confront him. Sugiura challenges them to various contests, stating that if they win, he will repeal the bylaws. After making them sign contracts to make the challenges official, Sugiura beats Gentaro and JK before transforming into the Taurus Zodiarts. Gentaro starts to fight him, but Sugiura reveals his powers allow him to manipulate those who sign his contracts before forcing him and JK to abide by his rules. While reluctantly doing so, they infiltrate the student council to determine what happened to Sugiura. They learn from council member, Keisuke Yanami, that Sugiura originally fought for individuality until his predecessor, Sayaka Mibu, was hospitalized, which changed his mind. Gentaro, Yuki, and Ryusei travel to the hospital to confirm before witnessing Sugiura remove Yanami's soul, turning him into a mindless drone. Ryusei fights Sugiura, but Virgo arrives to advise the latter. Meanwhile, Kengo learns Emoto has transferred to Miraikan to instruct the Kamen Rider Club and asks for his help in identifying the Zodiarts Switches' creator.
40	"I-Dea Pas-Sion"; Transliteration: "Ri Nen Jō Nen" (Japanese: 理・念・情・念)	Satoshi Morota	Keiichi Hasegawa	June 24, 2012
In a flashback, it is revealed Emoto killed Rokuro. In the present, Sugiura convinces Ryusei to accept a challenge between them before leaving with Virgo. The next day, Tomoko has become a fugitive of the student council, but is rescued by Emoto. While looking for a gift to thank him, she discovers he is Virgo. Meanwhile, Gentaro stops Sugiura from attacking a student council member named Shoko Oki, but is unable to fight back due to his contract. As Sugiura converts most of AGHS' students into his enthralled slaves to hunt the Kamen Rider Club, Yuki helps Gentaro escape. They later learn from Oki that Sugiura's feelings for Sayaka motivated his actions, inspiring Gentaro to get Sayaka's help in stopping Sugiura. Concurrently, Ryusei beats Sugiura in their challenge, but Sugiura enslaves him anyway to help him capture Oki, Yuki, and JK. However, Sugiura learns Sayaka has returned and is breaking his rules. Unable to bring himself to punish her, Sugiura frees the student body and befriends Gentaro. However, Emoto arrives to banish Sugiura to the Dark Nebula and confiscate his Horoscope Switch before escaping. Afterward, Emoto presents Sugiura's switch to Gamou before sending Tomoko to the Dark Nebula.
41	"The Club Col-Lapses"; Transliteration: "Bu Katsu Hō Kai" (Japanese: 部・活・崩・壊)	Kyohei Yamaguchi	Kazuki Nakashima	July 1, 2012
As Gamou attains his Zodiarts form, he orders Emoto to eliminate the Kamen Rider Club. Meanwhile, the club spend three days searching for Tomoko, initially to no avail until Tachibana warns them the Horoscopes may have killed her, advises Gentaro and Kengo to continue fighting them, and suggests a way for Gentaro to use the Cosmic Switch without relying on the power of friendship. The next day, Emoto intimidates Shun, JK, and Miu into abandoning Gentaro and Kengo. While attempting to attack Yuki, Gentaro and Ryusei fight him, during which Emoto threatens to kill the club and reveals what he did to Tomoko before leaving. As Kengo works to expose Emoto's identity and tells Yuki the club will be okay without her, Gentaro accepts Miu, Shun, and JK's wish to leave for fear of Emoto's threats. Later, Kengo, Gentaro, and Ryusei meet with Tachibana to undergo a grueling training regimen to rid Gentaro of his perceived weakness towards friendship. However, Kengo realizes Tachibana is Virgo. Exposed and joined by an arriving Hayami, Tachibana transforms to fight the Riders, during which he sends Ryusei to the Dark Nebula.
42	"Sagi-Tarius Con-Trols"; Transliteration: "I Te Kun Rin" (Japanese: 射・手・君・臨)	Kyohei Yamaguchi	Kazuki Nakashima	July 8, 2012
With Ryusei gone, Gentaro is overpowered by the two Horoscopes until Tachibana teleports Hayami to his lab and himself to his remote satellite headquarters, the M-BUS, to complete his plan for Gentaro. Following this, Kengo struggles to modify the Cosmic Switch per Tachibana's specifications while Gamou questions Emoto's conviction to his cause. Nonetheless, Emoto reassumes his Tachibana identity and Zodiarts form to challenge Gentaro. During the subsequent fight, Gentaro reveals he never lost faith in his friends before defeating him. Seeing the Kamen Rider Club return and stand by Gentaro, a changed Emoto brings Ryusei and Tomoko back, reveals he placed them and his other victims in suspended animation on the M-BUS for their safety and that he had been undermining the Horoscopes for years, and befriends Gentaro. However, Emoto is attacked and mortally wounded by Gamou. Gentaro and Ryusei fight him, but Gamou overpowers them while Emoto teleports the club to safety and himself and Kengo to AGHS to reveal the truth behind Rokuro's death before Hayami and Tatsugami find them. Emoto urges Kengo to stop Gamou before teleporting himself and the Horoscopes away, but they kill him and take his Horoscope Switch.
43	"Gem-Ini Light/Shade"; Transliteration: "Futa Go Mei An" (Japanese: 双・子・明・暗)	Hidenori Ishida	Riku Sanjo	July 15, 2012
Hayami and Gamou determine that Yuki has the potential to become a Horoscope. Sometime later, Gentaro finds her behaving strangely. Upon confronting her, she confesses to having no memory of her recent actions and insists that it was a doppelgänger. After she nearly kills Miu however, Gentaro confronts her once more, leading to Yuki transforming into the Gemini Zodiarts to fight him. Ryusei joins the fray, but Gentaro stops him before Yuki flees. When she returns, the Kamen Rider Club capture her, only to find she lacks a Horoscope Switch. While the club investigate the matter, Gentaro and Yuki argue over him distrusting her and forgetting something important to her. She escapes and returns home, where she finds a masked girl destroying her room. The doppelgänger reveals she is the physical embodiment of Yuki's inner darkness and is now acting on her darkest impulses. Meanwhile, the club discover the truth behind "Dark Yuki" and race to save the original. The Riders fight the doppelgänger, but Gamou arrives to support her, revealing that in twelve hours, she will replace Yuki. Amidst this, Yuki suddenly finds herself wearing her double's mask.
44	"Star Fate Cere-Mony"; Transliteration: "Sei Un Gi Shiki" (Japanese: 星・運・儀・式)	Hidenori Ishida	Riku Sanjo	July 22, 2012
Ryusei takes an attack from Dark Yuki meant for Gentaro before the Horoscopes leave to further Gamou's plans. Yuki flees as well, too ashamed to face her friends in her current state. Sometime later, Dark Yuki calls Gentaro to lure him into a trap, but the original Yuki confronts her, stealing her Horoscope Switch under the belief that it will reverse the transference. Due to this and her fading memory however, she unintentionally transforms into Gemini as her friends arrive. A misled Gentaro subsequently fights her until Kengo reveals the truth. Joined by Tatsugami and Hayami, Dark Yuki reclaims her switch and kidnaps Yuki for a ritual to finish the transference and her induction into the Horoscopes. Remembering his and Yuki's childhood promise to go to space together, Gentaro collects mementos from their first meeting before joining the club in disrupting the ritual by helping Yuki remember. While he fights and destroys Dark Yuki, Tatsugami attacks the club, but Kengo unknowingly manifests a force-field while ushering them to safety. Afterward, Hayami retrieves Dark Yuki's switch, but grows concerned regarding his place in Gamou's ranks once he finds the Pisces Zodiarts.
45	"Li-Bra De-Fects"; Transliteration: "Ten Bin Ri Han" (Japanese: 天・秤・離・反)	Satoshi Morota	Kazuki Nakashima	August 5, 2012
After celebrating Kengo's birthday, the Kamen Rider Club visit Haru and Ran. However, Hayami arrives to take Ran, claiming that she was chosen to participate in an exchange program in the U.S. Suddenly, Tatsugami attacks the pair, intending to kidnap Ran. Exposing his identity, Hayami asks Gentaro to help him save Ran. Despite his confusion, Gentaro agrees and successfully repels Tatsugami. Afterward, Hayami reveals to the gathered club that he has identified Ran as the Pisces Zodiarts, Gamou's role in the Zodiarts and Horoscopes' creation, and that he wants use the Horoscopes' combined powers to reach an alien being called the Presenter, which will destroy AGHS and the city in the process. Originally blinded by Gamou's charisma, Hayami claims he now wants to protect Ran and himself. As Kengo and JK pore through Emoto's research on Gamou, the others try to protect Ran, but are attacked by Tatsugami again. Hayami and the Riders fight back, but are overpowered until Ran obtains a Zodiarts Switch and willingly transforms into Pisces to defeat Tatsugami. Amidst this, Gamou arrives to confirm Hayami's words, explaining that he seeks to further humanity's evolution.
46	"Supe-Rior Sagit-Tarius"; Transliteration: "Ko Kō I Te" (Japanese: 孤・高・射・手)	Satoshi Morota	Kazuki Nakashima	August 12, 2012
Refusing to end his plot, Gamou overpowers the Riders before addressing Ran, but finds that the Pisces Switch is incomplete. He and Tatsugami leave, giving her time to reconsider joining them. Following this, Kengo faints and sees a vision of a strange switch coupled with the sound of an infant crying. After awakening with Yuki's help, he resumes studying Emoto's research. Concurrently, the remaining Kamen Rider Club members bring Ran to the Rabbit Hatch while Hayami and the Riders attempt to breach Gamou's office to steal the Horoscope Switches. However, they learn that Ran escaped to confront Tatsugami, who has captured Haru. Amidst her fight with Tatsugami, Ran's switch is completed. As Hayami and the Riders arrive, he steals it from her, revealing he tricked the pair to secure the Pisces Switch. The Riders fight Hayami and Tatsugami until Gamou arrives to take the Horoscope Switches. Suddenly, Kengo arrives, revealing Gamou is vulnerable now and told his friends beforehand. With Ryusei distracting Tatsugami, Gentaro attempts to defeat Gamou, but Hayami sacrifices himself to save Gamou before a strange light deactivates the Horoscope Switches. Realizing he underestimated Kengo, Gamou and Tatsugami retreat while the foreign switch emerges from Kengo.
47	"Close Friends Sepa-Rated"; Transliteration: "Shin Yū Betsu Ri" (Japanese: 親・友・別・離)	Koichi Sakamoto	Kazuki Nakashima	August 19, 2012
In flashbacks, the Presenter sent the Core Switch to Earth, where Rokuro and Gamou found it and reverse-engineered the Fourze Driver and Zodiarts Switches from it respectively before they fell out with each other. In the present, Kengo gathers the Kamen Rider Club to reveal that he is a cosmic energy construct created by the Core Switch called a "Core Child" along with his connection to Rokuro and Gamou. Furthermore, he was sent to study humanity and must now return to the Presenter. Over Gentaro's objections and his desire to stay, Kengo prepares to depart. However, an injured Ohsugi arrives to warn them that Tatsugami has captured the others, demanding the Core Switch in return for their safety. When Kengo tells Gamou that only the former can reach the Presenter, a furious Gamou tries to kill him, but Kengo uses his cosmic powers to survive until Gentaro arrives to fend off Gamou. While rescuing the others, Kengo secretly gives Yuki a letter before he and Ryusei help Gentaro. With Gamou seemingly defeated, Gentaro starts to help Kengo escape, but they are attacked by Gamou, who destroys the Core Switch, killing Kengo.
48	"Youth-Ful Gal-Axy"; Transliteration: "Sei Shun Gin Ga" (Japanese: 青・春・銀・河)	Koichi Sakamoto	Kazuki Nakashima	August 26, 2012
After killing Kengo, Gamou leaves to renew his plans while Gentaro and Ryusei regroup with their friends. Yuki finds Kengo's letter, in which he explains his gratitude towards the Kamen Rider Club and that they should not hate Gamou, but show him the error of his ways instead. The next day, the Riders confront the Horoscopes, with Ryusei fighting and eventually killing Tatsugami while Gentaro leads the club in telling Gamou how he and AGHS made them better people before defeating him and offering his friendship. Initially astonished, Gamou eventually accepts, but gradually starts to dissolve into stardust. Realizing he is suffering from a side effect of his exposure to cosmic energy, he urges Gentaro to continue his dream for him before leaving to die peacefully. As the new semester begins, Gentaro and Yuki are shocked to find Kengo alive. He reveals Gamou restored the Core Switch and used it to make him human. As Ryusei transfers back to Subaruboshi High, Gentaro welcomes Ran and Haru into the newly developed Space Kamen Rider Club with the goal of befriending the Presenter and everyone else in the universe.
