= Jerry Avorn =

American medical academic researcher

Jerry Avorn (born February 13, 1948) is a professor of medicine at Harvard Medical School and Founding Chief Emeritus of the Division of Pharmacoepidemiology and Pharmacoeconomics in the Department of Medicine at Brigham and Women’s Hospital. He founded one of the largest academic programs using health care utilization data to track medication use and outcomes, and developed the approach of "academic detailing" in which pharmacists, nurses, and physicians interactively educate doctors about evidence-based prescribing practices by using the same tactics that drug companies employ to market their products, but for strictly non-commercial purposes.

== Early life and education ==
Avorn was born in 1948, in New York City and grew up in Rockaway, Queens. He graduated from Far Rockaway H.S., where he was an editor of the student newspaper. While attending Columbia University during the opposition to the Vietnam War and American civil rights movement, he opposed the Vietnam War through investigative journalism for the Columbia Daily Spectator. In the summer of 1969, he collaborated with other Spectator journalists to write Up Against the Ivy Wall: A History of the Columbia Crisis about the campus uprising there. He graduated from Columbia with a B.A. in 1969 and then attended Harvard Medical School, where he was awarded an M.D. in 1974.

== Career ==
Avorn was an intern in medicine at the Cambridge Hospital in Cambridge, Massachusetts and completed his residency in primary care internal medicine at the Beth Israel Hospital (now the Beth Israel Deaconess Medical Center in Boston, Massachusetts). He became an associate professor at Harvard Medical School in 1985 and a full professor in 2005.

The first paper on academic detailing was published by Avorn in 1983 in The New England Journal of Medicine, reporting on a randomized controlled trial demonstrating the efficacy of the approach among 435 doctors in four states. It was followed by another report in the same journal of a randomized controlled trial that used academic detailing to reduce over-prescribing of sedating medications in nursing home patients. The academic detailing approach, sometimes called educational outreach, was documented to be effective in two systematic reviews and has been taken up by health care systems, insurers, and governments in the U.S., Canada, Europe, and Australia. In addition to the academic literature, this work has been featured in The Wall Street Journal and The Washington Post and on The Daily Show.

In 1998, Avorn founded the Division of Pharmacoepidemiology and Pharmacoeconomics (DoPE) in the Department of Medicine at Brigham and Women's Hospital and Harvard Medical School. It brings together faculty and trainees with backgrounds in medicine, epidemiology, law, statistics, health services research, and ethics to work collaboratively to address issues in prescribing and its outcomes, as well as medication-related adherence.

Research in DoPE led by Sebastian Schneeweiss has developed new approaches to the use of very large-scale collected health care utilization data, or real-world evidence, to study the benefits and risks of prescription drugs in routine clinical use. The Program On Regulation, Therapeutics, And Law (PORTAL), a component of DoPE co-founded by Avorn and Aaron Kesselheim, is one of the main research centers studying prescription drug regulation, affordability, and policy in the U.S.

Avorn is a founding member, past president and fellow of the International Society for Pharmacoepidemiology.

In 2004, he founded Alosa Health, a nonprofit organization that develops and implements academic detailing programs to improve prescribing, where he serves pro bono. He also co-founded the federally-funded National Resource Center on Academic Detailing (NaRCAD), now based at Boston Medical Center, which assists programs seeking to develop their own educational outreach programs to improve evidence-based prescribing.

Avorn's group's paper on selective NSAIDs (coxibs) was one of the first studies to demonstrate that Vioxx (rofercoxib) increased the risk of heart attack and stroke. In 2006 he testified as a plaintiff’s expert witness in the Vioxx litigation, but donated all profit from his involvement to charitable causes. He is one of the most highly cited authors in his field.

== Works ==
In addition to over 600 papers in the medical literature, Avorn is the author of the 2004 book Powerful Medicines (Knopf) and the 2025 book Rethinking Medications (Simon & Schuster).

=== Notable research ===
- Avorn, Jerry; Chen, Milton; Hartley, Robert (1982). "Scientific versus commercial sources of influence on the prescribing behavior of physicians". American Journal of Medicine. 73 (1): P4-8. doi:10.1016/0002-9343(82)90911-1. PMID 7091173.
- Avorn, Jerry; Soumerai, Stephen B. (1983). "Improving Drug-Therapy Decisions through Educational Outreach — A Randomized Controlled Trial of Academically Based Detailing". New England Journal of Medicine. 308 (24): 1457–1463. doi:10.1056/NEJM198306163082406. PMID 6406886.
- Avorn, Jerry; Soumerai, Stephen B.; Everitt, Daniel E.; Ross-Degnan, Dennis; Beers, Mark H.; Sherman, David; Salem-Schatz, Susanne R.; Fields, David (1992). "A Randomized Trial of a Program to Reduce the Use of Psychoactive Drugs in Nursing Homes". New England Journal of Medicine. 327 (3): 168–173. doi:10.1056/nejm199207163270306. PMID 1608408.
- Solomon, Daniel H.; Glynn, Robert J.; Levin, Raisa; Avorn, Jerry (2002). "Nonsteroidal Anti-inflammatory Drug Use and Acute Myocardial Infarction". Archives of Internal Medicine. 162 (10): 1099–1104. doi:10.1001/archinte.162.10.1099. ISSN 0003-9926. PMID 12020178.
- Brookhart, M. Alan; Schneeweiss, Sebastian; Rothman, Kenneth J.; Glynn, Robert J.; Avorn, Jerry; Stürmer, Til (2006). "Variable selection for propensity score models". American Journal of Epidemiology. 163 (12): 1149–1156. doi:10.1093/aje/kwj149. PMC 1513192. PMID 16624967.
- Avorn, Jerry; Sarpatwari, Ameet; Kesselheim, Aaron S. (2015). "Forbidden and Permitted Statements about Medications — Loosening the Rules". New England Journal of Medicine. 373 (10): 967–973. doi:10.1056/NEJMhle1506365. PMID 26332553.
- Avorn, Jerry (2025). "The 25th Anniversary of a Nearly Unknown Health Policy Turning Point". New England Journal of Medicine. doi:10.1056/NEJMp2515710. PMID 41406468.
