= The First-Year Experience Program =

- Abbreviation: FYE
- Formation: 1979; 47 years ago
- Purpose: Support transition from high school to college
- Origins: University of South Carolina

The First-Year Experience (FYE)—also known as the Freshman-Year Experience or the Freshman Seminar Program—refers to a range of programs implemented at colleges and universities in the United States to help students transition from high school to higher education. These initiatives often include academic seminars, orientation activities, mentoring, and co-curricular programming intended to improve student engagement, retention, and academic success.

The modern First-Year Experience movement emerged at the University of South Carolina in the 1970s and has since become a model for similar initiatives worldwide.

Programs vary in format and duration but typically combine academic coursework with community building experiences and skills training for new students.

== History ==
Originally, Boston College was where the first Freshman Orientation class was offered in the year 1888. Reed College, based in Portland, Oregon, was the first institution to offer a course for credit when, in 1911, they offered a course that was divided into men-only and women-only sections that met for 2 hours per week for the year.

In May 1970, University of South Carolina President Thomas Jones faced campus unrest and violence. In the aftermath he vowed to create a new course designed to "bond students to the institution and transform the way that undergraduate students were taught." In 1972, Carolina introduced "University 101", designed to "improve the educational experiences of first-year college students."

Carolina's program became a model for colleges and universities across the country, and in 1982, representatives from 175 schools came to Carolina to meet about the first-year experience. In 1983, Carolina's University 101 faculty director, John N. Gardner, organized the first Annual Conference on the Freshman Year Experience.

In 1986, Carolina partnered with the Newcastle-upon-Tyne Polytechnic to produce the first International Conference on the First-Year Experience. Also in 1986, Carolina established the National Resource Center; as it broadened its focus it underwent a number of name changes, settling on the National Resource Center for the First-Year Experience and Students in Transition in 1998. As the Center states on its website:

Today, the Center collaborates with its institutional partner, University 101 Programs, in pursuit of its mission to advance and support efforts to improve student learning and transitions into and through higher education. Through its work with conferences and continuing education, a full complement of publications, the pursuit of a research agenda, and the creation and dissemination of online resources, the Center has grown to become the trusted expert, internationally recognized leader, and clearinghouse for scholarship, policy, and best practice for the first-year experience and all post-secondary student transitions.

== Program models and structures ==
Many of the colleges and universities that use the program require that all incoming freshmen take the freshman seminar; other schools have the program as optional, but recommended. Most first-year seminars are a semester long and start at student orientation. From orientation, students enroll in the course, which gives them a variety of college experiences, from tours of the campus to a breakdown of how to study for tests. Many schools even offer students help with purchasing books from the school's bookstore.

For instance, as part of Mitchell College's First-Year Experience (FYE) program for transitioning into college, first-year students are assigned to Freshman Interest Groups (FIGs) in their first semester according to a common academic interest or major. These groups explore the topics and issues related to their chosen path. Those who arrive at Mitchell undecided about their academic route are also grouped together to allow for a broader survey of options. Students are encouraged to communicate their unique perspective and make connections through co-curricular activities. Some larger universities, such as the University at Albany, SUNY, through their Project Renaissance Program, create a "small college" feel by allowing freshmen to do their first-year courses in one section of the university.

Colby College's outdoor orientation COOT (Colby Outdoor Orientation Trips) program is designed to ease new students' transition into college and introduce them to Maine's cultural and natural resources. COOT features an on-campus orientation and a variety of trips, including hiking trips at Acadia National Park and Mount Katahdin canoe trips on the Kennebec and Moose Rivers, and other trips around the state. There are over 60 different trips, designed to appeal to incoming students with a variety of interests and fitness levels, and more "front country" trips have been added in recent years, including service- and arts-oriented options such as an organic farm stay and a challenge course. COOT leaders are chosen from upperclass students who apply for these positions, and are expected to help the students both during and after the trip with the adjustment to campus life.

In 1991, Norman Adler initiated the Penn Reading Project at the University of Pennsylvania, an integrative introduction to liberal learning for college freshmen newly arriving on campus. Subsequently, Freshman Reading Projects have been adopted widely as part of the first-year experience at many college campuses.

== Program credits ==
As a standard for most first-year seminars, many colleges give students one to two credits for completing the program, such as UC Irvine. Many schools, such as the State University of New York at Old Westbury in Old Westbury, New York, merge the program into a second course which helps to satisfy New York's general education requirement. In addition, the school recently introduced its Civic Engagement program, which is designed to allow students to participate in community service as a part of its First-Year Experience program.

== Workshops and training ==
The University of South Carolina hosts a seminar every year in which the many colleges and universities which have the First-Year Program get together to improve their own programs, and to offer suggestions to their colleagues on how they might also improve. The workshop is usually a week long and attendance is voluntary.

== Effectiveness ==
The University of North Carolina at Greensboro's First-Year Experience program is called University Studies 101 (UNS 101). The program aims to assist students in discovering their purpose, identifying their strengths, and aligning these newly discovered assets with a plan for their future. The activities, class discussions, and assignments used in the course guide students through the six appreciative advising stages. A comprehensive program evaluation which includes the tracking of academic outcomes and assessment of student attitudes and behaviors has evidenced the positive impact of the UNS 101 program. For example, the freshman to sophomore retention rate of freshmen who completed UNS 101 in fall 2006 and returned for fall 2007 was 81.9%. This compares to a retention rate of 74.4% for freshmen who did not take the course. Meanwhile, the average first-semester GPA for students who did not take the course was 2.49, while UNS 101 participants had an average first-semester GPA of 2.72.

J.N. Gardner, member of The Journal of the American Association of Collegiate Registrars and Admissions Officers and author of The freshman-year experience, emphasized the importance of having courses that focus on the first few weeks of college. During this time is most likely when students will make the decision to drop out, due to the increase of feeling personal independence and habit-forming, as well as forming relationships that they will continue throughout their college careers. Gardner also suggested that things such as curriculum modifications, academic advisement, faculty led freshman-level courses instead of graduate student-led, living/learning environments, peer counseling, and special freshmen administrative units improve the student's freshman year.

== See also ==
- Appreciative advising
- Purpose Network
- Purpose-guided education
- Student affairs
- Supplemental instruction
