= Academic advising =

Teaching method

Academic advising is, according to NACADA: The Global Community for Academic Advising, "a series of intentional interactions with a curriculum, a pedagogy, and a set of student learning outcomes. Academic advising synthesizes and contextualizes students' educational experiences within the frameworks of their aspirations, abilities and lives to extend learning beyond campus boundaries and timeframes."

== History ==
Academic advising traces its beginnings to the earliest of American colleges including Harvard University. The book Academic Advising: A Comprehensive Handbook, sponsored by the National Academic Advising Association (NACADA), contains chapters on the historical foundations, theory, current practices, ethics, and legal issues of academic advising.

According to Kramer (as cited in Harrison, 2004), the history of faculty as academic advisors can be traced back to 1841 at Kenyon College. At that time, the college required students to choose a faculty member to be their advisor. The faculty member would then help the student determine what courses they needed to take in order to graduate.

== Standards ==
Of significance to the profession of academic advising are the Standards and Guidelines for Academic Advising that have been developed by the Council for the Advancement of Standards in Higher Education (CAS) and endorsed by the National Academic Advising Association (NACADA). These Standards and Guidelines are available at the NACADA web site. The Standards and their accompanying Guidelines cover thirteen areas from Mission to Assessment. The current Standards and Guidelines were last updated in 2005.

== Models ==
A variety of approaches exist to academic advising, each of which is informed by the goals of the advisor-student interaction. Three principle models of advising include developmental advising, prescriptive advising, and intrusive advising.

=== Developmental Advising ===
Developmental advising was first introduced by Crookson in 1972. This approach is focused on helping students explore and define academic, career and life goals and pathways, and develop problem-solving and decision-making skills through collaborative and process-oriented advising. Fostering a relationship between the advisor and student is critical to this model, which is based primarily on adult development theory and student development theory. Although many studies have shown that students generally prefer this approach it can require a greater commitment of time and resources compared to other advising models. It also allows for advisors to honor the life and career experiences of adult learners in higher education.

=== Prescriptive Advising ===
The prescriptive or traditional advising model is focused primarily on providing students with information directly related to their academic program and progress, such as academic policies, major/program requirements and course selection. Prescriptive advising is normally initiated by the student as the goal of this approach is to address immediate questions to facilitate the student’s progress through their academic program, rather than play a role in helping the student form long-term goals beyond their academic pursuits. This type of advising is sometimes equated to a doctor-patient relationship model.

=== Intrusive Advising ===
A model for intrusive advising (also known as high involvement or proactive advising) was first introduced by Glennon in 1975. A defining feature of this approach is that contact is initiated by the advisor rather than the student. Generally, contact with students is initiated at critical periods throughout a student’s academic career, such as during a student’s first year of study, while taking developmental or remedial courses, before they must declare a major, or as they approach graduation. Additionally, particular cohorts of students may be targeted such as academically at-risk students (e.g. students on probation), or high-achieving students. In practice intrusive advising has been shown to have a positive impact on developmental/remedial undergraduate mathematics course pass rates, as well as student retention and degree attainment rates, and research indicates that students prefer this approach to advising over strictly prescriptive advising. Some students may find this approach invasive.

== Effectiveness ==
Academic advising is shown to be more successful when advisors hold face-to-face appointments with their advisees, particularly with topics like future classes, and careers. Face-to-face interactions make advising more meaningful for the students. Additionally, students place more importance on the supportive and caring nature of their relationship with their advisor than on the particular approach to advising.

Participation in academic advising has been shown to increase student satisfaction and mitigate students’ feelings of isolation or disconnection from the institution as a whole, both of which according to Tinto (as cited in Gravel, 2012) are linked to increased university student retention and graduation rates, and reduced attrition and withdrawal rates. This effect has been documented for both traditional ‘on-campus’ institutions and institutions which offer courses and/or entire programs through online/virtual formats.

== See also ==
- Academic administration
- Academic detailing
- University Counseling Center
- Appreciative advising
