= John Michael Njenga Mututho =

Kenyan politician

John Michael Njenga Mututho EBS
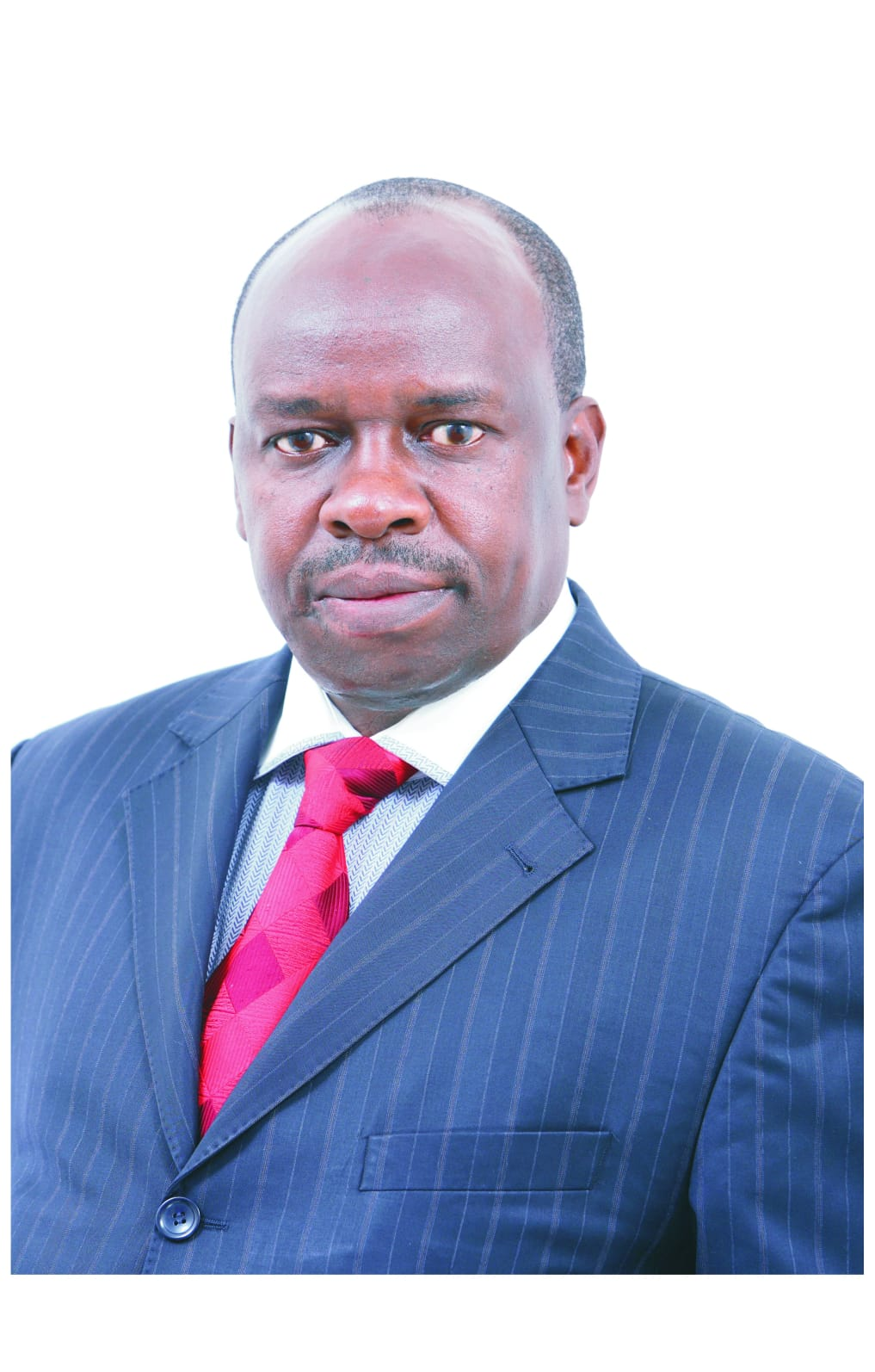
- Hon. John Mututho, EBS

Member of Parliament for Naivasha Constituency
- In office 2007–2013

Chairman of NACADA
- In office 2013–2016

Personal details
- Born: John Michael Njenga Mututho [1955] [Nakuru], Kenya
- Occupation: Agricultural Scientist, Politician

John Michael Njenga Mututho (EBS) is a Kenyan politician and the immediate former chairman of the National Authority for the Campaign against Alcohol and Drug Abuse (NACADA) Board and an Independent candidate for governor, Nakuru County in the general elections of August 2017. He is a former member of parliament and previously belonged to the Kenya African National Union and was elected to represent the Naivasha Constituency in the National Assembly of Kenya in the 2007 Kenyan parliamentary election.

"The National Assembly's committee of Administration and National Security has rejected the nomination of John Mututho to head the National Authority for the Campaign against Alcohol and Drug Abuse (Nacada)".

== Education ==
Mututho has a Diploma in Range Management from Egerton University, Kenya and a Bsc in Range Management and Agriculture from the University of Nairobi, Kenya. He also has a Post Graduate Diploma in Resource Economics and an Msc. in Environment Economics from La Trobe University, Australia.

== Career ==
Before his service in Parliament, Mututho worked in the civil service for 11 years and was a coordinator of the International Agencies and Government of Kenya projects in Arid and Semi Arid Lands (ASAL) for two years. He designed a water harvesting systems implemented by FAO in Kenya and Ethiopia using shallow pit systems. He was also chairman of board of governors Naivasha Girls Secondary School for seven years and helped transform the school into a top performer. He founded Computers for Schools Kenya (CFSK) in 2002, an NGO through which more than 70,000 computers have been distributed to schools countrywide.

In 2005, Mututho was charged for fraud relating to transactions between August and December 2001. Mr Mututho is alleged to have obtained KES 41.5 million using fake Kenya Revenue Authority claiming that he was entitled to a tax refund channeled to the Kenyatta National Hospital which Mututho's company had supplied bedside lockers. Speaking out about the case, Mututho claimed that his legal troubles were politically motivated as the case was initiated while he was campaigning against the constitution during Kenya's 2005 referendum. In July 2014, Mututho was cleared of the fraud charges due to lack of evidence.

== Career in parliament ==
Mututho was elected member of parliament in the 2007 general elections and later won an election petition with a High Court decision declaring him the winner of the 2007 parliamentary elections for Naivasha Constituency. In February 2014, a court ordered Mututho to deposit KES 6.4 million or have his property auctioned after he lost a case seeking the court to review the costs of his 2007 election petition. As a member of parliament, Mututho served as Chairman Departmental Committee on Agriculture, Lands and Natural Resources which was later renamed the Departmental Committee on Agriculture, Livestock and Cooperatives that then oversaw six ministries. Mututho is also known for introducing the Alcohol Control Act which among other things limits the operation time of bars and others alcohols selling outlets to 5:00 pm till 11:00 pm on weekdays and 2:00 pm to 11:00 pm on weekends and legalizes consumption and sale of traditional alcoholic beverages. The Alcohol Control Act was enacted in 2010.

== As Chairman of NACADA ==
President Uhuru Kenyatta appointed Mututho as the chairman of NACADA on November 20, 2013, after parliament approved his nomination. Soon after his appointment, Mututho publicly contemplated controlling private gatherings in which alcohol was served during the Christmas Season. The announcement received sharp reaction by the Kenyan public and Mututho was criticized for attempting to infringe on Kenyans' constitutional right to privacy. In an interview on radio, Mututho claimed that his statement had been misinterpreted saying that he had proposed the licensing of alcohol distributors who made deliveries to homes or private parties and not the widely held claim that he wanted to license house parties themselves.

In June 2014, Mututho was report as spearheading attempts by NACADA to lobby for the death penalty of persons convicted of causing death by selling illicit alcoholic brews. On June 25, 2014, NACADA banned nineteen Hookah flavors found to contain banned substances. The decision was announced to the media by Mututho. In early July 2014, Mututho claimed that the governor for Machakos County, Dr. Alfred Mutua, had failed to prevent the abuse of drugs and alcohol by minors in a recently held rugby tournament and further advised that the event be banned. Mututho faced backlash from residents of the county terming the allegations as outrageous and far-fetched. Social media responded to Mututho's allegations as his attempt at banning everything. also he is the founder of nakuru county students caucus(ncsc) a caucus for students at higher institutions.
