= Purpose Network =

Educational online community

In higher education, a purpose network is an online community intentionally designed to support critical student learning outcomes through peer-to-peer, peer-to-staff, and staff-to-peer communication. College student purpose networks, unlike social networks, create the academic and social communities essential for success in university life.

“Progressive universities are capitalizing on these fundings by creating focused, intentional online purpose networks to facilitate their institutional goals. In a college student purpose network, universities seek to instill and provide platforms to support institutional learning outcomes. College student purpose networks, unlike the social networks (such as MySpace and Facebook), intentionally create the academic and social communities essential for university life. They are bidirectional communicative platforms going far above and beyond email as a means of communication.”

As an example, in order to support student success and retention initiatives, institutions may use purpose networks as part of a strategy to follow recommendations from retention literature to: increase academic and social integration, mattering and marginality, and engagement.

“Preliminary results from a study conducted by EducationDynamics across 20 schools indicate that students involved in purpose networks were retained to their sophomore year at a 9% higher rate than students not involved in the network. Additionally, over 13% of students surveyed across 26 universities reported that the purpose network was “very important” or “extremely important” in their decision to remain enrolled at the university.”

Members of the university purpose network community can include administration, staff, faculty, instructors, and RA's. Purpose networks can be used in The First Year Experience Program, overall persistence programs, admissions, alumni outreach, parent communication and more. Within admissions, purpose networks can be used as a marketing tool to sway prospective students to attend an institution be increasing the interactivity of the students connections to the institutions. University purpose networks take advantage of the two-way communication afforded by Web 2.0 and includes content such as written articles, self-assessment surveys, peer-peer connections, profiles, discussions boards, groups, reviews of places, online curricula and more.
