= Appreciative advising =

Academic advising philosophy

Appreciative advising (AA) represents an academic advising approach designed to enhance student-advisor interactions, whether in one-on-one or group settings. Rooted in David Cooperrider's organizational development theory of appreciative inquiry, this philosophy aims to foster positive student experiences and outcomes.

== History ==
Appreciative advising emerged from an article written by Jennifer L. Bloom and Nancy Archer Martin titled "Incorporating Appreciative Inquiry into Academic Advising" that appeared in the online academic advising journal at Penn State, The Mentor, on August 29, 2002. Subsequently, the University of North Carolina at Greensboro (UNCG) began implementing the concepts outlined in the article and began to demonstrate success in terms of student retention. Bryant Hutson and Scott Amundsen at UNCG coined the term "appreciative advising". Bloom, Hutson, and He (2008) wrote the first book, titled The Appreciative Advising Revolution, on the topic.

In 2012, the University of South Carolina began offering an online appreciative advising course as well as a process for certifying appreciative advisers. Building on the success of the appreciative approach to academic advising, the movement has expanded to other areas, including teaching (appreciative college instruction), orientation, admissions, Greek life, and tutoring. This expansion of the principles of appreciative advising is now known as appreciative education.

== Core ==
=== The six phases ===
Disarm
The Disarm phase involves making a positive first impression with students and allaying any fear or suspicion they might have of meeting with the advisor.
Discover
The Discover phase is spent continuing to build rapport with students and learning about their strengths, skills, and abilities through utilizing effective and positive open-ended questions that encourages narratives.
Dream
The Dream phase involves uncovering students' hopes and dreams for their futures.
Design
The Design phase is spent co-creating a plan to make their hopes and dreams come true.
Deliver
The Deliver phase is the implementation phase where students carry out their plan, and the advisor’s role is to support them as they encounter roadblocks.
Don't Settle
The Don't Settle phase involves challenging students to achieve their full potential and supporting them along their journey.

== Certification ==
=== Professional certification ===
The University of South Carolina's Office of Appreciative Education now offers a professional rating for academic advisers: Appreciative Advising Certification. Certified Appreciative Advisors are committed to a standard of excellence in the field of advising and optimizing their students' educational experiences. The certification process includes successful attendance of the Appreciative Advising Institute or completion of the appreciative advising course, as well as completed advising rubrics, recommendations, a current CV, and personal advising theory.

=== Benefits of certification ===
- Advanced professional qualification
- Increased skills and knowledge
- Raised professional expectations
- Elevated advising experience for students

=== Appreciative Advising Institute ===
The Appreciative Advising Institute was first held in August 2011 in Las Vegas, Nevada. The 2012 Appreciative Advising Institute was held July 28–31 in Charleston, SC. The Institute is intentionally designed to teach participants the theoretical structure of appreciative advising and to provide skills training in implementing this framework. This conference is designed to provide ample opportunity for participants to extend theory to practice. Participants learn how the six phases help both the advisor and advisee optimize their educational experiences.

=== Appreciative Advising Course ===
The Appreciative Advising Course is designed to be a community of learners (instructors included). There are opportunities for participants to interact with other community members each week. This is done via discussion board conversations, as well as optional live chat dialogues. Active participants greatly enhance their own learning experience as well as that of the community. This is an eight-week course.

== Institutions using AA ==
- University of North Carolina Greensboro

Advising, adviser training, undergraduate academic courses, Appreciative Advising Inventory, and graduate-level ESL courses

- University of North Carolina at Wilmington

Advising, adviser training, TEAL Learning Community, and Academic Recovery Program

- Indiana University-Purdue University Indianapolis

Advising students on probation, workshops for students on probation, and adviser training

- University of South Carolina at Columbia

Advising students on probation, adviser training, Appreciative Advising Inventory, advising master's degree students in Higher Education and Student Affairs programs, and a graduate-level course that focuses on appreciative advising

- Miami University Hamilton

Advising all students, including probation students; advising syllabus; adviser training; and Appreciative Advising Inventory

- Eastern Illinois University

Advising adult and non-traditional students, electronic advising

- Prairie State College

Advising at-risk students, faculty and adviser training

- Grand Valley State University

Advising honors students and candidates for fellowships

- Florida Atlantic University

Advising traditional and non-traditional students, honors students, probation/suspension/at-risk students; advising syllabus, advisor training, workshop presentations

== UNCG's usage ==
=== Academic recovery programming ===
When students feel academically discouraged, such as when they are on academic probation, they may need to be reminded of the strengths that led them to college in the first place. Students in academic trouble also typically have a limited time in which to improve their status. Practically, it is quicker to correct this status by building on strengths and maintaining a course load and engaging in academic and social behaviors that reflect these strengths than it is to attempt to correct long-standing deficits. The SAS 100 program at UNCG features the use of the Appreciative Advising Inventory as the basis for three mandatory advising sessions and the use of appreciative advising questions in weekly reflections and discussions. All instructors are trained to use appreciative advising in their meetings with the students. After the appreciative approach was introduced, retention of SAS 100 students improved 18%. When control and treatment groups were compared, the treatment group achieved a statistically significant GPA gain of .73 (p=. 03) compared to the control group at .42.

=== Internal transfer advising ===
Appreciative advising can be used in internal transfer cases in which a student has realized that their current declared major may not be a good fit, but are struggling to identify a new major. Student Academic Services at UNCG has used appreciative advising to assist declared pre-nursing majors who have not met continuance requirements. This began as a pilot program in the spring of 2005, and currently includes all pre-nursing majors who have a cumulative GPA that has been identified as not competitive by the School of Nursing. The goal of the program is to help students explore their options, given that they are unlikely to be accepted into the School of Nursing. Of the 145 students served by the program during the spring and fall semesters of 2005, 30% have changed their major, while an additional 43% continue to receive advising through Student Academic Services. The mean GPA for participants has also improved dramatically.

=== First-year Experience Program ===
UNCG's First-Year Experience program is called University Studies 101 (UNS 101), and uses a curriculum emphasizing appreciative advising. One stated aim of the program is to assist students in discovering their purposes, identifying their strengths, and aligning these newly discovered assets with plans for their future. The activities, class discussions, and assignments used in the course guide students through the six appreciative advising stages. A comprehensive program evaluation which includes the tracking of academic outcomes and assessment of student attitudes and behaviors has evidenced the positive impact of the UNS 101 program (Hutson & Atwood, 2005). For example, the freshman to sophomore retention rate of freshmen who completed UNS 101 in fall 2006 and returned for fall 2007 was 81.9%. This compares to a retention rate of 74.4% for freshmen who did not take the course. Meanwhile, the average first semester GPA for students who did not take the course was 2.49, while UNS 101 participants had an average first semester GPA of 2.72.
