= Gilgil Constituency =

Kenyan electoral constituency

Gilgil
- constituency for the Parliament of Kenya
- Gilgil Constituency within Nakuru County

- Nakuru County within Kenya
- County: Nakuru
- Population: 185,209
- Area: 1,075 km^{2} (415.1 sq mi)

Current constituency
- Number of members: 1
- Party: UDA
- Member of Parliament: Martha Wangari Wanjira
- Wards: 5

Gilgil is a constituency in Kenya. It is one of eleven constituencies in Nakuru County.

== Members of Parliament ==
Elections	MP	Party	Notes
2013	Samuel Mathenge Nderitu	The National Alliance	TNA was part of the Jubilee Alliance coalition.
2017	Martha Wangari Wanjira	Jubilee Party	
2022	Martha Wangari Wanjira	United Democratic Alliance	
