= Charity Kathambi Chepkwony =

Kenyan politician

Charity Kathambi Chepkwony is a Kenyan politician. She is the member of parliament for Njoro Constituency.

== Early years and education ==
Chepkwony was born and brought up in Kangeta village of Meru county. She had her primary education at Kaongo ka Mau Primary School and her secondary education at Mukinduri Girls High School. She furthered at Jomo Kenyata University of Agriculture and Technology where she graduated with a certificate in County Governance. In 2004, she completed the University of Nairobi with a diploma in Sales and Marketing. She also attended Kenya Methodist University and Mt Kenya University where she acquired a bachelor's degree in Business Administration and a master's degree in Development Studies respectively.

== Career ==
In 2017, she was elected to the Kenya National Assembly to serve as the member of parliament for Njoro constituency. Prior to that she worked as a SACCO Clerk at the Signon Freight Limited, a sales representative at Consolidated Bank and board member of Kenya Literature Bureau (KLB) under the Ministry of Education.

== Politics ==
Chepkwony first contested for the Njoro parliamentary seat in 2013 but lost. She contested again in the 2017 general elections and won, defeating five independent male candidates.

== Personal life ==
She is married with three children.
