= National Academic Advising Association =

NACADA: The Global Community for Academic Advising
- Abbreviation: NACADA
- Formation: 1979
- Type: 501(c)(3)
- Legal status: Association
- Purpose: Educational
- Headquarters: NACADA Executive Office
- Location: Manhattan, Kansas
- Region served: Worldwide
- Members: Over 10,000
- Executive Director: Kyle Ross
- Parent organization: Kansas State University
- Staff: 25
- Website: nacada.ksu.edu

NACADA: The Global Community for Academic Advising (NACADA) is a 501(c)(3) non-profit organization. It is an international, educational association of individuals engaged in the work of academic advising. Its membership of over 10,000 international individuals is reported to include representatives from more than 2,400 institutions and organizations related to higher education; individuals are classified by status as a faculty member, professional advisor, graduate student, student support personnel, peer advisors, and administrators. Its stated goal is to serve staff and faculty who provide academic advising to post-secondary students. The NACADA Executive Office has been housed in Manhattan, Kansas on the campus of Kansas State University since 1990.

NACADA is a member of the American Council on Education, the Council for the Advancement of Standards in Higher Education CAS, and maintains a partnership with the National Collegiate Athletic Association to further student-athlete development and academic success.

The NACADA organization sponsors conferences, institutes, scholarships, web-based resources and seminars, Commission and Interest Groups, research-based publications, a speaker and consultants’ service, and an awards program. Online master's degree, doctorate, and graduate certificate programs are offered in conjunction with Kansas State University.

The NACADA website houses an indexed list of articles, statistics, and peer-reviewed scholarly articles, the Clearinghouse of Academic Advising Resources, as a free resource for both members and non-members. The site strictly adheres to scholarly standards on copyright and appropriate citation of sources and may be useful for practitioners, researchers, and students investigating student success, persistence, and graduation from institutions of higher education.

== Regions ==
- Region 1 - Connecticut, Maine, Massachusetts, New Brunswick, New Hampshire, New York, Newfoundland and Labrador, Nova Scotia, Price Edward Island, Quebec, Rhode Island, and Vermont.
- Region 2 - Delaware, District of Columbia, Maryland, New Jersey, Pennsylvania, and Virginia.
- Region 3 - Kentucky, North Carolina, South Carolina, Tennessee, and West Virginia.
- Region 4 - Alabama, Caribbean, Florida, Georgia, Mississippi, Puerto Rico, and U.S. Virgin Island.
- Region 5 - Illinois, Indiana, Michigan, Nunavut, Ohio, Ontario, and Wisconsin.
- Region 6 - Iowa, Manitoba, Minnesota, Nebraska, North Dakota, Northwest Territories, Saskatchewan, and South Dakota.
- Region 7 - Arkansas, Kansas, Louisiana, Missouri, Oklahoma, and Texas.
- Region 8 - Alaska, Alberta, British Columbia, Idaho, Montana, Oregon, Washington, and Yukon.
- Region 9 - American Samoa, California, Guam, Hawaii, Nevada, and Northern Mariana Islands.
- Region 10 - Arizona, Colorado, New Mexico, Utah, and Wyoming.

== Conferences ==
NACADA holds an annual conference to address issues in academic advising. A specific theme is chosen, around which the sessions and presentations are designed.

== 2021-2025 ==
2025 - Las Vegas, NV - Viva Advising: Excellence in Student Support

2024 - Pittsburg, PA - A Beautiful Day in the Burgh: Championing Advisors as Helpers

2023 - Orlando, FL - Reimagine the Magic of Academic Advising

2022 - Portland, OR - Building Bridges: Honoring our Past, Celebrating the Present, and Preparing for the Future

2021 - Cincinnati, OH - Together, All Things are Possible

=== 2011-2020 ===
2020 - Virtual Online Conference - No Student Is an Island: The Rich Port of Advising and Connection

2019 - Louisville, KY - In Their Corner: Advising Students to be the GREATEST!

2018 - Phoenix, AZ - Life Stories: The Art of Academic Advising

2017 - St. Louis, MO - Meet Me in St. Louis: The Gateway to Student Success

2016 - Atlanta, GA - ATL: Advising to Learn

2015 - Las Vegas, NV - What Happens in Advising Stays with Students

2014 - Minneapolis, MN - Adventures in Advising: Explore, Discover, Collaborate, Transform

2013 - Salt Lake City, UT - Success Elevated: Greatest Advising on Earth

2012 - Nashville, TN - Empowering Students to Write Their Own Songs of Success

2011 - Denver, CO - Advising with Altitude

=== 2001-2010 ===
2010 - Orlando, FL - The Fast Pass to Student Success

2009 - San Antonio, TX - Deep in the Heart of Advising

2008 - Chicago, IL - Taking Advising to New Heights

2007 - Baltimore, MD - Advisors as Navigators: From Orientation to Graduation and Beyond

2006 - Indianapolis, IN - Diverse Advising for a Diverse World

2005 - Las Vegas, NV - Hitting the Jackpot: Making Academic Success a Sure Bet!

2004 - Cincinnati, OH - Building Bridges: Advisors as Architects for the Future

2003 - Dallas, TX - Academic Advising: Teach, Encourage, Excel, Advise, Support - Building Stronger Networks for Student Success

2002 - Salt Lake City, UT - Academic Advising: Official Sponsors of Student Success

2001 - Ottawa, ON - Academic Advising: Discover the Many Voices

=== 1991-2000 ===
2000 - Orlando, FL - Advising in the 21st Century: Tradition, Innovation, and Vision

1999 - Denver, CO - Rocky Mountain Summit: Partnerships and Collaboration to Foster Retention

1998 - San Diego, CA - New Horizons: Learning from the Past, Preparing for the Future

1997 - Kansas City, MO - Show Me: From Advising Theory to Practice

1996 - Washington, DC - Advocacy & Innovation in Academic Advising

1995 - Nashville, TN - Academic Advising: Patterns in the Present...Pathways to the Future

1994 - Las Vegas, NV - (Riviera) Reach for the Stars: Global Challenges for Academic Advising

1993 - Detroit, MI - Academic Advising in the 90s: Using Resources Creatively to Serve Diverse Populations

1992 - Atlanta, GA - The Challenge of Change: Empowering Students through Academic Advising

1991 - Louisville, KY - Academic Advising: New Visions for a New Century

=== 1981-1990 ===
1990 - Anaheim, CA - Academic Advising: Continuing Visions, Renewed Commitments, New Frontiers

1989 - Houston, TX - Academic Advising and Institutional Effectiveness

1988 - Miami, FL - Academic Advising: Tradition vs Innovation

1987 - Chicago, IL - Diversity in Academic Advising: Changing Populations/Increasing Standards

1986 - Seattle, WA - Ten Years Later: Academic Advising Reconsidered...Perspectives, Promises, Performances

1985 - Kansas City, MO - Academic Advisors: Responding to a Call for Excellence in Higher Education

1984 - Philadelphia, PA - Academic Advising as a Form of Teaching

1983 - St. Louis, MO - Beyond Change: Managing the Multifaceted Role of the Academic Advisor

1982 - San Jose, CA - Breaking with Tradition: The Advisor as Change Agent

1981 - Indianapolis, IN - Academic Advising: The Pivotal Point

=== 1977-1980 ===
1980 - Asheville, NC - Academic Advising as a Developmental Process

1979 - Omaha, NE - Impact: Advising for the '80s

1978 - Memphis, TN - Impact: Advising Makes the Difference

1977 - Burlington, VT

In addition to the annual conference, each of the regions holds a yearly conference specific to the colleges and universities present in the region. Many states in turn also hold a yearly conference for colleges and universities present in the state.

== Future Conferences ==
October 4–7, 2026
Oklahoma City Convention Center
Oklahoma City, OK

October 24-27, 2027
Hyatt Regency Atlanta and Atlanta Marriott Marquis
Atlanta, GA
