= Jayne Kihara =

Kenyan politician

Hon. Jayne Njeri Wanjikū Kìhara

Member of Parliament for Naivasha Constituency
- Incumbent
- Assumed office 2003
- Preceded by: Paul Kihara

Personal details
- Education: Riamukurue Primary School; Gìthūngūri Girls Secondary School; Cathedral Secretarial College
- Occupation: Politician
- Known for: Voting for Finance Bill 2023 & 2024; Involvement in Ndabibi Farm land dispute; NG-CDF bursary fund discrepancies

Jayne Njeri Wanjikū Kìhara is a Kenyan politician. She is currently the only member of parliament for Naivasha Constituency.

She voted to pass the 2023 Finance Bill and also 2024 Finance Bill 2024 on 20 June 2024.

She is credited with aiding the grabbing of Ndabibi Farm. Kìhara was involved in defending President William Ruto over the ownership of a 5000-acre piece of land in Ndabibi. She insisted that Ruto had legally acquired the land and accused local leaders of orchestrating a land-grabbing scheme targeting unsuspecting owners.

In the 2021/2022 financial year, she had KSh 64 million in unsupported bursary payments from the NG-CDF. The Auditor General's report highlighted significant discrepancies and ineffective internal controls, raising concerns about the lawful use of public funds.

== Education ==
Kìhara attended primary education at Riamukurwe Primary School in Nyeri Town Constituency. She also joined secondary education at Gìthūngūri Girls. She furthered her education at Cathedral Secretarial College.

== Personal life ==
She is the wife of the late member of parliament for Naivasha Constituency, Paul Kihara, whom she succeeded in Parliament.
