= Academic detailing =

Academic detailing is "university or non-commercial-based educational outreach." The process involves face-to-face education of prescribers by trained health care professionals, typically pharmacists, physicians, or nurses. The goal of academic detailing is to improve prescribing of targeted drugs to be consistent with medical evidence from randomized controlled trials, which ultimately improves patient care and can reduce health care costs. A key component of non-commercial or university-based academic detailing programs is that they (academic detailers/clinical educators, management, staff, program developers, etc.) do not have any financial links to the pharmaceutical industry.

Academic detailing has been studied for over 25 years and has been shown to be effective at improving prescribing of targeted medications about 5% from baseline. Though it is primarily used to affect prescribing, it is also used to educate providers regarding other non-drug interventions, such as screening guidelines.

== Organizations ==
Many academic detailing programs exist around the world. In the United States, university-based state programs exist in Illinois, Vermont, Oregon and South Carolina. The nonprofit organization Alosa Health runs an academic detailing program in Pennsylvania, Massachusetts and Washington, DC called the Independent Drug Information Service (IDIS). The National Resource Center for Academic Detailing (NaRCAD), funded by the Agency for Healthcare Research and Quality (AHRQ) in 2010, was created to help organizations with limited resources to establish and improve their own programs and to create a network of academic detailing programs. The U.S. Department of Veterans Affairs Pharmacy Benefits Management pilot tested the National Academic Detailing Service in 2010 to enhance veterans' outcomes by empowering clinicians and promoting the use of evidence-based treatments using delivered by clinical pharmacy specialists. After the pilot, in March 2015, the Interim Under Secretary for Health issued a memorandum requiring implementation of AD programs throughout the Veterans Health Administration.

Programs also exist in Canada through the Canadian Academic Detailing Collaboration (CADC), including the Centre for Effective Practice's (CEP) academic detailing service in Ontario, and Australia through the Drug and Therapeutics Information Service (DATIS) and the National Prescribing Service (NPS). In Belgium academic detailing is provided by Project Farmaka.

== See also ==
- Comparative effectiveness research
- Evidence-based medicine
- Pharmaceutical marketing
- Prescription drug prices in the United States
- Randomized controlled trials
- Physician detailing
