= Njoro Constituency =

Electoral constituency of Kenya

Njoro
- constituency for the Parliament of Kenya
- Njoro Constituency within Nakuru County

- Nakuru County within Kenya
- County: Nakuru
- Population: 238,773
- Area: 699 km^{2} (269.9 sq mi)

Current constituency
- Number of members: 1
- Party: UDA
- Member of Parliament: Charity Kathambi Chepkwony
- Wards: 6

Njoro is a constituency in Kenya. It is one of eleven constituencies in Nakuru County.
