= List of MeSH codes (G14) =

The following is a partial list of the "G" codes for Medical Subject Headings (MeSH), as defined by the United States National Library of Medicine (NLM).

This list continues the information at List of MeSH codes (G13). Codes following these are found at List of MeSH codes (H01). For other MeSH codes, see List of MeSH codes.

The source for this content is the set of 2006 MeSH Trees from the NLM.

== MeSH G14 – genetic structures ==
=== MeSH G14.080 – base sequence ===
==== MeSH G14.080.380 – gc rich sequence ====
- MeSH G14.080.380.160 – cpg islands

==== MeSH G14.080.689 – regulatory sequences, nucleic acid ====
- MeSH G14.080.689.330 – enhancer elements (genetics)
- MeSH G14.080.689.330.240 – e-box elements
- MeSH G14.080.689.330.400 – hiv enhancer
- MeSH G14.080.689.330.700 – response elements
- MeSH G14.080.689.330.700.800 – serum response element
- MeSH G14.080.689.330.700.920 – vitamin d response element
- MeSH G14.080.689.390 – insulator elements
- MeSH G14.080.689.450 – locus control region
- MeSH G14.080.689.650 – operator regions (genetics)
- MeSH G14.080.689.675 – promoter regions (genetics)
- MeSH G14.080.689.675.700 – response elements
- MeSH G14.080.689.675.700.800 – serum response element
- MeSH G14.080.689.675.700.920 – vitamin d response element
- MeSH G14.080.689.675.850 – TATA box
- MeSH G14.080.689.687 – regulatory sequences, ribonucleic acid
- MeSH G14.080.689.687.249 – rna 3' polyadenylation signals
- MeSH G14.080.689.687.490 – rna splice sites
- MeSH G14.080.689.687.500 – rna 5' terminal oligopyrimidine sequence
- MeSH G14.080.689.755 – silencer elements, transcriptional
- MeSH G14.080.689.810 – terminator regions (genetics)

==== MeSH G14.080.708 – repetitive sequences, nucleic acid ====
- MeSH G14.080.708.330 – interspersed repetitive sequences
- MeSH G14.080.708.330.200 – dna transposable elements
- MeSH G14.080.708.330.330 – genomic islands
- MeSH G14.080.708.330.800 – retroelements
- MeSH G14.080.708.330.800.175 – endogenous retroviruses
- MeSH G14.080.708.330.800.200 – genes, intracisternal a-particle
- MeSH G14.080.708.330.800.400 – long interspersed nucleotide elements
- MeSH G14.080.708.330.800.800 – short interspersed nucleotide elements
- MeSH G14.080.708.330.800.800.050 – alu elements
- MeSH G14.080.708.800 – tandem repeat sequences
- MeSH G14.080.708.800.074 – dna repeat expansion
- MeSH G14.080.708.800.074.865 – trinucleotide repeat expansion
- MeSH G14.080.708.800.150 – dna, satellite
- MeSH G14.080.708.800.500 – microsatellite repeats
- MeSH G14.080.708.800.500.150 – dinucleotide repeats
- MeSH G14.080.708.800.500.850 – trinucleotide repeats
- MeSH G14.080.708.800.500.850.200 – trinucleotide repeat expansion
- MeSH G14.080.708.800.550 – minisatellite repeats
- MeSH G14.080.708.850 – terminal repeat sequences
- MeSH G14.080.708.850.400 – hiv long terminal repeat
- MeSH G14.080.708.850.400.400 – hiv enhancer

=== MeSH G14.160 – chromosome structures ===
==== MeSH G14.160.165 – centromere ====
- MeSH G14.160.165.500 – kinetochores

==== MeSH G14.160.180 – chromatin ====
- MeSH G14.160.180.270 – euchromatin
- MeSH G14.160.180.383 – heterochromatin
- MeSH G14.160.180.383.800 – sex chromatin
- MeSH G14.160.180.625 – nucleosomes

=== MeSH G14.162 – chromosomes ===
==== MeSH G14.162.178 – chromosomes, artificial ====
- MeSH G14.162.178.170 – chromosomes, artificial, bacterial
- MeSH G14.162.178.190 – chromosomes, artificial, mammalian
- MeSH G14.162.178.190.117 – chromosomes, artificial, human
- MeSH G14.162.178.195 – chromosomes, artificial, p1 bacteriophage
- MeSH G14.162.178.200 – chromosomes, artificial, yeast

==== MeSH G14.162.190 – chromosomes, bacterial ====
- MeSH G14.162.190.170 – chromosomes, artificial, bacterial

==== MeSH G14.162.360 – chromosomes, fungal ====
- MeSH G14.162.360.800 – chromosomes, artificial, yeast

==== MeSH G14.162.520 – chromosomes, mammalian ====
- MeSH G14.162.520.190 – chromosomes, artificial, mammalian
- MeSH G14.162.520.190.117 – chromosomes, artificial, human
- MeSH G14.162.520.300 – chromosomes, human
- MeSH G14.162.520.300.117 – chromosomes, artificial, human
- MeSH G14.162.520.300.235 – chromosomes, human, 1-3
- MeSH G14.162.520.300.235.240 – chromosomes, human, pair 1
- MeSH G14.162.520.300.235.245 – chromosomes, human, pair 2
- MeSH G14.162.520.300.235.250 – chromosomes, human, pair 3
- MeSH G14.162.520.300.280 – chromosomes, human, 4-5
- MeSH G14.162.520.300.280.285 – chromosomes, human, pair 4
- MeSH G14.162.520.300.280.290 – chromosomes, human, pair 5
- MeSH G14.162.520.300.325 – chromosomes, human, 6-12 and x
- MeSH G14.162.520.300.325.330 – chromosomes, human, pair 6
- MeSH G14.162.520.300.325.335 – chromosomes, human, pair 7
- MeSH G14.162.520.300.325.340 – chromosomes, human, pair 8
- MeSH G14.162.520.300.325.345 – chromosomes, human, pair 9
- MeSH G14.162.520.300.325.345.700 – philadelphia chromosome
- MeSH G14.162.520.300.325.350 – chromosomes, human, pair 10
- MeSH G14.162.520.300.325.355 – chromosomes, human, pair 11
- MeSH G14.162.520.300.325.360 – chromosomes, human, pair 12
- MeSH G14.162.520.300.325.680 – chromosomes, human, x
- MeSH G14.162.520.300.370 – chromosomes, human, 13-15
- MeSH G14.162.520.300.370.375 – chromosomes, human, pair 13
- MeSH G14.162.520.300.370.380 – chromosomes, human, pair 14
- MeSH G14.162.520.300.370.385 – chromosomes, human, pair 15
- MeSH G14.162.520.300.415 – chromosomes, human, 16-18
- MeSH G14.162.520.300.415.420 – chromosomes, human, pair 16
- MeSH G14.162.520.300.415.425 – chromosomes, human, pair 17
- MeSH G14.162.520.300.415.430 – chromosomes, human, pair 18
- MeSH G14.162.520.300.460 – chromosomes, human, 19-20
- MeSH G14.162.520.300.460.465 – chromosomes, human, pair 19
- MeSH G14.162.520.300.460.470 – chromosomes, human, pair 20
- MeSH G14.162.520.300.505 – chromosomes, human, 21-22 and y
- MeSH G14.162.520.300.505.510 – chromosomes, human, pair 21
- MeSH G14.162.520.300.505.515 – chromosomes, human, pair 22
- MeSH G14.162.520.300.505.515.700 – philadelphia chromosome
- MeSH G14.162.520.300.505.757 – chromosomes, human, y

==== MeSH G14.162.865 – sex chromosomes ====
- MeSH G14.162.865.800 – sex chromatin
- MeSH G14.162.865.982 – x chromosome
- MeSH G14.162.865.982.500 – chromosomes, human, x
- MeSH G14.162.865.983 – y chromosome
- MeSH G14.162.865.983.500 – chromosomes, human, y

=== MeSH G14.335 – genetic code ===
==== MeSH G14.335.355 – codon ====
- MeSH G14.335.355.225 – codon, initiator
- MeSH G14.335.355.250 – codon, terminator
- MeSH G14.335.355.250.235 – codon, nonsense

==== MeSH G14.335.760 – reading frames ====
- MeSH G14.335.760.640 – open reading frames

=== MeSH G14.337 – genetic vectors ===
==== MeSH G14.337.249 – chromosomes, artificial ====
- MeSH G14.337.249.170 – chromosomes, artificial, bacterial
- MeSH G14.337.249.190 – chromosomes, artificial, mammalian
- MeSH G14.337.249.190.117 – chromosomes, artificial, human
- MeSH G14.337.249.195 – chromosomes, artificial, p1 bacteriophage
- MeSH G14.337.249.200 – chromosomes, artificial, yeast

=== MeSH G14.340 – genome ===
==== MeSH G14.340.024 – genome components ====
- MeSH G14.340.024.079 – attachment sites, microbiological
- MeSH G14.340.024.159 – cpg islands
- MeSH G14.340.024.189 – dna sequence, unstable
- MeSH G14.340.024.189.220 – dna repeat expansion
- MeSH G14.340.024.189.220.865 – trinucleotide repeat expansion
- MeSH G14.340.024.189.610 – chromosome fragile sites
- MeSH G14.340.024.220 – dna, intergenic
- MeSH G14.340.024.220.150 – dna, satellite
- MeSH G14.340.024.220.280 – 3' flanking region
- MeSH G14.340.024.220.282 – 5' flanking region
- MeSH G14.340.024.220.400 – introns
- MeSH G14.340.024.220.760 – replication origin
- MeSH G14.340.024.220.880 – untranslated regions
- MeSH G14.340.024.220.880.880 – 3' untranslated regions
- MeSH G14.340.024.220.880.885 – 5' untranslated regions
- MeSH G14.340.024.340 – genes
- MeSH G14.340.024.340.077 – alleles
- MeSH G14.340.024.340.137 – gene components
- MeSH G14.340.024.340.137.190 – codon
- MeSH G14.340.024.340.137.190.225 – codon, initiator
- MeSH G14.340.024.340.137.190.250 – codon, terminator
- MeSH G14.340.024.340.137.232 – exons
- MeSH G14.340.024.340.137.232.459 – hinge exons
- MeSH G14.340.024.340.137.232.920 – vdj exons
- MeSH G14.340.024.340.137.275 – expressed sequence tags
- MeSH G14.340.024.340.137.290 – 3' flanking region
- MeSH G14.340.024.340.137.295 – 5' flanking region
- MeSH G14.340.024.340.137.430 – immunoglobulin switch region
- MeSH G14.340.024.340.137.515 – introns
- MeSH G14.340.024.340.137.650 – open reading frames
- MeSH G14.340.024.340.137.750 – regulatory elements, transcriptional
- MeSH G14.340.024.340.137.750.249 – enhancer elements (genetics)
- MeSH G14.340.024.340.137.750.249.240 – e-box elements
- MeSH G14.340.024.340.137.750.249.400 – hiv enhancer
- MeSH G14.340.024.340.137.750.249.765 – response elements
- MeSH G14.340.024.340.137.750.249.765.800 – serum response element
- MeSH G14.340.024.340.137.750.249.765.920 – vitamin d response element
- MeSH G14.340.024.340.137.750.680 – promoter regions (genetics)
- MeSH G14.340.024.340.137.750.680.765 – response elements
- MeSH G14.340.024.340.137.750.680.765.800 – serum response element
- MeSH G14.340.024.340.137.750.680.765.920 – vitamin d response element
- MeSH G14.340.024.340.137.750.680.850 – TATA box
- MeSH G14.340.024.340.137.750.830 – terminator regions (genetics)
- MeSH G14.340.024.340.137.750.840 – transcription initiation site
- MeSH G14.340.024.340.137.775 – rna 3' polyadenylation signals
- MeSH G14.340.024.340.137.780 – rna splice sites
- MeSH G14.340.024.340.137.785 – rna 5' terminal oligopyrimidine sequence
- MeSH G14.340.024.340.137.910 – untranslated regions
- MeSH G14.340.024.340.137.910.880 – 3' untranslated regions
- MeSH G14.340.024.340.137.910.885 – 5' untranslated regions
- MeSH G14.340.024.340.198 – genes, archaeal
- MeSH G14.340.024.340.201 – genes, bacterial
- MeSH G14.340.024.340.250 – genes, cdc
- MeSH G14.340.024.340.277 – genes, developmental
- MeSH G14.340.024.340.277.500 – genes, homeobox
- MeSH G14.340.024.340.304 – genes, dominant
- MeSH G14.340.024.340.308 – genes, duplicate
- MeSH G14.340.024.340.312 – genes, essential
- MeSH G14.340.024.340.320 – genes, fungal
- MeSH G14.340.024.340.320.089 – genes, mating type, fungal
- MeSH G14.340.024.340.328 – genes, helminth
- MeSH G14.340.024.340.345 – genes, immediate-early
- MeSH G14.340.024.340.351 – genes, immunoglobulin
- MeSH G14.340.024.340.351.300 – genes, immunoglobulin heavy chain
- MeSH G14.340.024.340.351.300.249 – hinge exons
- MeSH G14.340.024.340.351.300.500 – immunoglobulin switch region
- MeSH G14.340.024.340.351.310 – genes, immunoglobulin light chain
- MeSH G14.340.024.340.353 – genes, insect
- MeSH G14.340.024.340.359 – genes, lethal
- MeSH G14.340.024.340.361 – genes, mdr
- MeSH G14.340.024.340.376 – genes, mitochondrial
- MeSH G14.340.024.340.383 – genes, neoplasm
- MeSH G14.340.024.340.383.249 – genes, tumor suppressor
- MeSH G14.340.024.340.383.249.050 – genes, apc
- MeSH G14.340.024.340.383.249.100 – genes, brca1
- MeSH G14.340.024.340.383.249.105 – genes, brca2
- MeSH G14.340.024.340.383.249.200 – genes, dcc
- MeSH G14.340.024.340.383.249.320 – genes, mcc
- MeSH G14.340.024.340.383.249.340 – genes, neurofibromatosis 1
- MeSH G14.340.024.340.383.249.345 – genes, neurofibromatosis 2
- MeSH G14.340.024.340.383.249.375 – genes, p16
- MeSH G14.340.024.340.383.249.385 – genes, p53
- MeSH G14.340.024.340.383.249.400 – genes, retinoblastoma
- MeSH G14.340.024.340.383.249.420 – genes, wilms tumor
- MeSH G14.340.024.340.383.500 – oncogenes
- MeSH G14.340.024.340.383.500.791 – proto-oncogenes
- MeSH G14.340.024.340.383.500.791.100 – genes, abl
- MeSH G14.340.024.340.383.500.791.148 – genes, bcl-1
- MeSH G14.340.024.340.383.500.791.150 – genes, bcl-2
- MeSH G14.340.024.340.383.500.791.290 – genes, erba
- MeSH G14.340.024.340.383.500.791.295 – genes, erbb
- MeSH G14.340.024.340.383.500.791.295.300 – genes, erbb-1
- MeSH G14.340.024.340.383.500.791.295.305 – genes, erbb-2
- MeSH G14.340.024.340.383.500.791.325 – genes, fms
- MeSH G14.340.024.340.383.500.791.330 – genes, fos
- MeSH G14.340.024.340.383.500.791.365 – genes, jun
- MeSH G14.340.024.340.383.500.791.400 – genes, mos
- MeSH G14.340.024.340.383.500.791.418 – genes, myb
- MeSH G14.340.024.340.383.500.791.420 – genes, myc
- MeSH G14.340.024.340.383.500.791.550 – genes, ras
- MeSH G14.340.024.340.383.500.791.552 – genes, rel
- MeSH G14.340.024.340.383.500.791.560 – genes, sis
- MeSH G14.340.024.340.383.500.791.570 – genes, src
- MeSH G14.340.024.340.391 – genes, overlapping
- MeSH G14.340.024.340.391.600 – nested genes
- MeSH G14.340.024.340.393 – genes, plant
- MeSH G14.340.024.340.395 – genes, protozoan
- MeSH G14.340.024.340.400 – genes, rag-1
- MeSH G14.340.024.340.415 – genes, recessive
- MeSH G14.340.024.340.415.400 – genes, tumor suppressor
- MeSH G14.340.024.340.415.400.050 – genes, apc
- MeSH G14.340.024.340.415.400.100 – genes, brca1
- MeSH G14.340.024.340.415.400.105 – genes, brca2
- MeSH G14.340.024.340.415.400.200 – genes, dcc
- MeSH G14.340.024.340.415.400.320 – genes, mcc
- MeSH G14.340.024.340.415.400.340 – genes, neurofibromatosis 1
- MeSH G14.340.024.340.415.400.345 – genes, neurofibromatosis 2
- MeSH G14.340.024.340.415.400.375 – genes, p16
- MeSH G14.340.024.340.415.400.385 – genes, p53
- MeSH G14.340.024.340.415.400.400 – genes, retinoblastoma
- MeSH G14.340.024.340.415.400.420 – genes, wilms tumor
- MeSH G14.340.024.340.470 – genes, regulator
- MeSH G14.340.024.340.470.412 – genes, arac
- MeSH G14.340.024.340.470.413 – genes, nef
- MeSH G14.340.024.340.470.416 – genes, px
- MeSH G14.340.024.340.470.418 – genes, rev
- MeSH G14.340.024.340.470.420 – genes, switch
- MeSH G14.340.024.340.470.560 – genes, tat
- MeSH G14.340.024.340.470.575 – genes, vif
- MeSH G14.340.024.340.470.578 – genes, vpr
- MeSH G14.340.024.340.470.580 – genes, vpu
- MeSH G14.340.024.340.495 – genes, reporter
- MeSH G14.340.024.340.520 – genes, sry
- MeSH G14.340.024.340.540 – genes, suppressor
- MeSH G14.340.024.340.582 – genes, synthetic
- MeSH G14.340.024.340.585 – genes, t-cell receptor
- MeSH G14.340.024.340.585.050 – genes, t-cell receptor alpha
- MeSH G14.340.024.340.585.080 – genes, t-cell receptor beta
- MeSH G14.340.024.340.585.240 – genes, t-cell receptor delta
- MeSH G14.340.024.340.585.400 – genes, t-cell receptor gamma
- MeSH G14.340.024.340.605 – genes, viral
- MeSH G14.340.024.340.605.172 – genes, env
- MeSH G14.340.024.340.605.258 – genes, gag
- MeSH G14.340.024.340.605.345 – genes, immediate-early
- MeSH G14.340.024.340.605.360 – genes, intracisternal a-particle
- MeSH G14.340.024.340.605.600 – genes, nef
- MeSH G14.340.024.340.605.667 – genes, pol
- MeSH G14.340.024.340.605.735 – genes, px
- MeSH G14.340.024.340.605.775 – genes, rev
- MeSH G14.340.024.340.605.850 – genes, tat
- MeSH G14.340.024.340.605.890 – genes, vif
- MeSH G14.340.024.340.605.897 – genes, vpr
- MeSH G14.340.024.340.605.900 – genes, vpu
- MeSH G14.340.024.340.610 – major histocompatibility complex
- MeSH G14.340.024.340.610.595 – genes, mhc class i
- MeSH G14.340.024.340.610.600 – genes, mhc class ii
- MeSH G14.340.024.340.620 – minor histocompatibility loci
- MeSH G14.340.024.340.623 – minor lymphocyte stimulatory loci
- MeSH G14.340.024.340.645 – multigene family
- MeSH G14.340.024.340.645.500 – genes, mdr
- MeSH G14.340.024.340.645.750 – genes, rrna
- MeSH G14.340.024.340.700 – pseudogenes
- MeSH G14.340.024.340.720 – quantitative trait loci
- MeSH G14.340.024.340.825 – transgenes
- MeSH G14.340.024.340.825.500 – genes, transgenic, suicide
- MeSH G14.340.024.420 – insulator elements
- MeSH G14.340.024.425 – interspersed repetitive sequences
- MeSH G14.340.024.425.200 – dna transposable elements
- MeSH G14.340.024.425.500 – genomic islands
- MeSH G14.340.024.425.800 – retroelements
- MeSH G14.340.024.425.800.175 – endogenous retroviruses
- MeSH G14.340.024.425.800.200 – genes, intracisternal a-particle
- MeSH G14.340.024.425.800.400 – long interspersed nucleotide elements
- MeSH G14.340.024.425.800.800 – short interspersed nucleotide elements
- MeSH G14.340.024.425.800.800.050 – alu elements
- MeSH G14.340.024.430 – isochores
- MeSH G14.340.024.470 – locus control region
- MeSH G14.340.024.630 – nucleolus organizer region
- MeSH G14.340.024.686 – operon
- MeSH G14.340.024.686.545 – lac operon
- MeSH G14.340.024.686.645 – operator regions (genetics)
- MeSH G14.340.024.686.817 – rrna operon
- MeSH G14.340.024.742 – regulon
- MeSH G14.340.024.745 – replicon
- MeSH G14.340.024.745.725 – replication origin
- MeSH G14.340.024.810 – sequence tagged sites
- MeSH G14.340.024.815 – silencer elements, transcriptional
- MeSH G14.340.024.850 – tandem repeat sequences
- MeSH G14.340.024.850.140 – dna repeat expansion
- MeSH G14.340.024.850.150 – dna, satellite
- MeSH G14.340.024.850.500 – microsatellite repeats
- MeSH G14.340.024.850.500.150 – dinucleotide repeats
- MeSH G14.340.024.850.500.850 – trinucleotide repeats
- MeSH G14.340.024.850.500.850.200 – trinucleotide repeat expansion
- MeSH G14.340.024.850.550 – minisatellite repeats

==== MeSH G14.340.050 – genome, archaeal ====
- MeSH G14.340.050.500 – genes, archaeal

==== MeSH G14.340.300 – genome, bacterial ====
- MeSH G14.340.300.249 – genes, bacterial
- MeSH G14.340.300.500 – operon
- MeSH G14.340.300.500.545 – lac operon
- MeSH G14.340.300.500.645 – operator regions (genetics)
- MeSH G14.340.300.500.817 – rrna operon

==== MeSH G14.340.325 – genome, fungal ====
- MeSH G14.340.325.500 – genes, fungal
- MeSH G14.340.325.500.089 – genes, mating type, fungal

==== MeSH G14.340.337 – genome, helminth ====
- MeSH G14.340.337.500 – genes, helminth

==== MeSH G14.340.357 – genome, insect ====
- MeSH G14.340.357.500 – genes, insect

==== MeSH G14.340.365 – genome, plant ====
- MeSH G14.340.365.500 – genes, plant

==== MeSH G14.340.375 – genome, protozoan ====
- MeSH G14.340.375.500 – genes, protozoan

==== MeSH G14.340.400 – genome, viral ====
- MeSH G14.340.400.500 – genes, viral
- MeSH G14.340.400.500.172 – genes, env
- MeSH G14.340.400.500.258 – genes, gag
- MeSH G14.340.400.500.345 – genes, immediate-early
- MeSH G14.340.400.500.360 – genes, intracisternal a-particle
- MeSH G14.340.400.500.600 – genes, nef
- MeSH G14.340.400.500.667 – genes, pol
- MeSH G14.340.400.500.735 – genes, px
- MeSH G14.340.400.500.775 – genes, rev
- MeSH G14.340.400.500.850 – genes, tat
- MeSH G14.340.400.500.890 – genes, vif
- MeSH G14.340.400.500.897 – genes, vpr
- MeSH G14.340.400.500.900 – genes, vpu

=== MeSH G14.840 – templates, genetic ===
The list continues at List of MeSH codes (H01).
