= List of MeSH codes (G06) =

The following is a partial list of the "G" codes for Medical Subject Headings (MeSH), as defined by the United States National Library of Medicine (NLM).

This list continues the information at List of MeSH codes (G05). Codes following these are found at List of MeSH codes (G07). For other MeSH codes, see List of MeSH codes.

The source for this content is the set of 2006 MeSH Trees from the NLM.

== MeSH G06 – biochemical phenomena, metabolism, and nutrition ==
=== MeSH G06.184 – biochemical phenomena ===
==== MeSH G06.184.154 – binding sites ====
- MeSH G06.184.154.147 – allosteric site
- MeSH G06.184.154.290 – bay region (chemistry)
- MeSH G06.184.154.309 – binding, competitive
- MeSH G06.184.154.408 – binding sites, antibody

==== MeSH G06.184.179 – body composition ====
- MeSH G06.184.179.134 – body fat distribution
- MeSH G06.184.179.134.500 – adiposity
- MeSH G06.184.179.180 – body fluid compartments

==== MeSH G06.184.227 – calcification, physiologic ====
- MeSH G06.184.227.710 – tooth calcification

==== MeSH G06.184.348 – energy transfer ====
- MeSH G06.184.348.400 – linear energy transfer

==== MeSH G06.184.480 – ion transport ====
- MeSH G06.184.480.100 – calcium signaling

==== MeSH G06.184.603 – molecular structure ====
- MeSH G06.184.603.060 – amino acid sequence
- MeSH G06.184.603.060.040 – amino acid motifs
- MeSH G06.184.603.060.040.500 – f-box motifs
- MeSH G06.184.603.060.125 – catalytic domain
- MeSH G06.184.603.060.270 – exteins
- MeSH G06.184.603.060.360 – histone code
- MeSH G06.184.603.060.425 – immunoglobulin variable region
- MeSH G06.184.603.060.425.160 – complementarity determining regions
- MeSH G06.184.603.060.440 – inteins
- MeSH G06.184.603.060.620 – peptide library
- MeSH G06.184.603.060.670 – protein sorting signals
- MeSH G06.184.603.060.670.600 – nuclear export signals
- MeSH G06.184.603.060.670.610 – nuclear localization signals
- MeSH G06.184.603.060.720 – repetitive sequences, amino acid
- MeSH G06.184.603.060.720.030 – ankyrin repeat
- MeSH G06.184.603.080 – base sequence
- MeSH G06.184.603.080.040 – at rich sequence
- MeSH G06.184.603.080.380 – gc rich sequence
- MeSH G06.184.603.080.380.160 – cpg islands
- MeSH G06.184.603.080.534 – matrix attachment regions
- MeSH G06.184.603.080.689 – regulatory sequences, nucleic acid
- MeSH G06.184.603.080.689.330 – enhancer elements (genetics)
- MeSH G06.184.603.080.689.330.240 – e-box elements
- MeSH G06.184.603.080.689.330.400 – hiv enhancer
- MeSH G06.184.603.080.689.330.700 – response elements
- MeSH G06.184.603.080.689.330.700.800 – serum response element
- MeSH G06.184.603.080.689.330.700.920 – vitamin d response element
- MeSH G06.184.603.080.689.390 – insulator elements
- MeSH G06.184.603.080.689.450 – locus control region
- MeSH G06.184.603.080.689.650 – operator regions (genetics)
- MeSH G06.184.603.080.689.675 – promoter regions (genetics)
- MeSH G06.184.603.080.689.675.700 – response elements
- MeSH G06.184.603.080.689.675.700.800 – serum response element
- MeSH G06.184.603.080.689.675.700.920 – vitamin d response element
- MeSH G06.184.603.080.689.675.850 – TATA box
- MeSH G06.184.603.080.689.687 – regulatory sequences, ribonucleic acid
- MeSH G06.184.603.080.689.687.249 – rna 3' polyadenylation signals
- MeSH G06.184.603.080.689.687.490 – rna splice sites
- MeSH G06.184.603.080.689.687.500 – rna 5' terminal oligopyrimidine sequence
- MeSH G06.184.603.080.689.755 – silencer elements, transcriptional
- MeSH G06.184.603.080.689.810 – terminator regions (genetics)
- MeSH G06.184.603.080.708 – repetitive sequences, nucleic acid
- MeSH G06.184.603.080.708.330 – interspersed repetitive sequences
- MeSH G06.184.603.080.708.330.200 – dna transposable elements
- MeSH G06.184.603.080.708.330.200.500 – integrons
- MeSH G06.184.603.080.708.330.330 – genomic islands
- MeSH G06.184.603.080.708.330.800 – retroelements
- MeSH G06.184.603.080.708.330.800.175 – endogenous retroviruses
- MeSH G06.184.603.080.708.330.800.200 – genes, intracisternal a-particle
- MeSH G06.184.603.080.708.330.800.400 – long interspersed nucleotide elements
- MeSH G06.184.603.080.708.330.800.800 – short interspersed nucleotide elements
- MeSH G06.184.603.080.708.330.800.800.050 – alu elements
- MeSH G06.184.603.080.708.800 – tandem repeat sequences
- MeSH G06.184.603.080.708.800.140 – dna repeat expansion
- MeSH G06.184.603.080.708.800.140.865 – trinucleotide repeat expansion
- MeSH G06.184.603.080.708.800.150 – dna, satellite
- MeSH G06.184.603.080.708.800.500 – microsatellite repeats
- MeSH G06.184.603.080.708.800.500.150 – dinucleotide repeats
- MeSH G06.184.603.080.708.800.500.850 – trinucleotide repeats
- MeSH G06.184.603.080.708.800.500.850.200 – trinucleotide repeat expansion
- MeSH G06.184.603.080.708.800.550 – minisatellite repeats
- MeSH G06.184.603.080.708.850 – terminal repeat sequences
- MeSH G06.184.603.080.708.850.400 – hiv long terminal repeat
- MeSH G06.184.603.080.708.850.400.400 – hiv enhancer
- MeSH G06.184.603.160 – carbohydrate sequence
- MeSH G06.184.603.580 – conserved sequence
- MeSH G06.184.603.580.175 – consensus sequence
- MeSH G06.184.603.790 – molecular conformation
- MeSH G06.184.603.790.235 – carbohydrate conformation
- MeSH G06.184.603.790.486 – nucleic acid conformation
- MeSH G06.184.603.790.486.100 – base pairing
- MeSH G06.184.603.790.709 – protein conformation
- MeSH G06.184.603.790.709.550 – protein structure, quaternary
- MeSH G06.184.603.790.709.600 – protein structure, secondary
- MeSH G06.184.603.790.709.600.040 – amino acid motifs
- MeSH G06.184.603.790.709.600.040.030 – ankyrin repeat
- MeSH G06.184.603.790.709.600.040.050 – at-hook motifs
- MeSH G06.184.603.790.709.600.040.127 – cystine knot motifs
- MeSH G06.184.603.790.709.600.040.205 – f-box motifs
- MeSH G06.184.603.790.709.600.040.360 – helix-loop-helix motifs
- MeSH G06.184.603.790.709.600.040.360.240 – ef hand motifs
- MeSH G06.184.603.790.709.600.040.360.360 – helix-turn-helix motifs
- MeSH G06.184.603.790.709.600.040.520 – leucine zippers
- MeSH G06.184.603.790.709.600.040.985 – zinc fingers
- MeSH G06.184.603.790.709.610 – protein structure, tertiary
- MeSH G06.184.603.790.709.610.380 – hmg-box domains
- MeSH G06.184.603.790.709.610.480 – kringles
- MeSH G06.184.603.790.709.610.800 – src homology domains
- MeSH G06.184.603.790.709.805 – structural homology, protein

==== MeSH G06.184.842 – sequence homology ====
- MeSH G06.184.842.200 – sequence homology, amino acid
- MeSH G06.184.842.200.820 – structural homology, protein
- MeSH G06.184.842.550 – sequence homology, nucleic acid
- MeSH G06.184.842.550.830 – synteny

==== MeSH G06.184.850 – signal transduction ====
- MeSH G06.184.850.400 – ion channel gating
- MeSH G06.184.850.560 – map kinase signaling system
- MeSH G06.184.850.580 – mechanotransduction, cellular
- MeSH G06.184.850.700 – phototransduction
- MeSH G06.184.850.800 – second messenger systems
- MeSH G06.184.850.800.100 – calcium signaling
- MeSH G06.184.850.850 – synaptic transmission

==== MeSH G06.184.872 – structure-activity relationship ====
- MeSH G06.184.872.500 – quantitative structure-activity relationship

==== MeSH G06.184.941 – virus replication ====
- MeSH G06.184.941.950 – virus assembly

==== MeSH G06.184.963 – water-electrolyte balance ====
- MeSH G06.184.963.500 – kallikrein-kinin system
- MeSH G06.184.963.750 – water loss, insensible

=== MeSH G06.535 – metabolism ===
==== MeSH G06.535.023 – absorption ====
- MeSH G06.535.023.500 – intestinal absorption
- MeSH G06.535.023.750 – skin absorption

==== MeSH G06.535.095 – acylation ====
- MeSH G06.535.095.052 – acetylation
- MeSH G06.535.095.055 – aminoacylation
- MeSH G06.535.095.055.860 – transfer rna aminoacylation

==== MeSH G06.535.130 – alkylation ====
- MeSH G06.535.130.538 – methylation
- MeSH G06.535.130.538.161 – dna methylation

==== MeSH G06.535.166 – biological transport ====
- MeSH G06.535.166.310 – biological transport, active
- MeSH G06.535.166.310.100 – active transport, cell nucleus
- MeSH G06.535.166.310.657 – membrane potentials
- MeSH G06.535.166.330 – capillary permeability
- MeSH G06.535.166.335 – cell membrane permeability
- MeSH G06.535.166.355 – cytoplasmic streaming
- MeSH G06.535.166.355.040 – axonal transport
- MeSH G06.535.166.500 – ion transport
- MeSH G06.535.166.500.100 – calcium signaling
- MeSH G06.535.166.700 – protein transport
- MeSH G06.535.166.700.100 – active transport, cell nucleus
- MeSH G06.535.166.775 – respiratory transport
- MeSH G06.535.166.775.602 – pulmonary gas exchange
- MeSH G06.535.166.850 – rna transport

==== MeSH G06.535.256 – carbohydrate metabolism ====
- MeSH G06.535.256.249 – fermentation
- MeSH G06.535.256.500 – gluconeogenesis
- MeSH G06.535.256.625 – glycogenolysis
- MeSH G06.535.256.750 – glycolysis
- MeSH G06.535.256.875 – pentose phosphate pathway

==== MeSH G06.535.335 – energy metabolism ====
- MeSH G06.535.335.154 – basal metabolism
- MeSH G06.535.335.342 – citric acid cycle
- MeSH G06.535.335.436 – glycolysis
- MeSH G06.535.335.531 – oxidation-reduction
- MeSH G06.535.335.531.403 – electron transport
- MeSH G06.535.335.531.587 – lipid peroxidation
- MeSH G06.535.335.631 – oxidative phosphorylation
- MeSH G06.535.335.693 – pentose phosphate pathway
- MeSH G06.535.335.755 – photosynthesis
- MeSH G06.535.335.755.605 – photophosphorylation
- MeSH G06.535.335.770 – proton-motive force
- MeSH G06.535.335.835 – substrate cycling

==== MeSH G06.535.520 – lipid metabolism ====
- MeSH G06.535.520.249 – lipogenesis
- MeSH G06.535.520.500 – lipolysis
- MeSH G06.535.520.500.500 – lipid mobilization

==== MeSH G06.535.710 – oxidative stress ====
- MeSH G06.535.710.690 – protein carbonylation

==== MeSH G06.535.723 – oxygen consumption ====
- MeSH G06.535.723.110 – anaerobic threshold
- MeSH G06.535.723.620 – respiratory burst

==== MeSH G06.535.770 – peptide biosynthesis ====
- MeSH G06.535.770.050 – aminoacylation
- MeSH G06.535.770.050.860 – transfer rna aminoacylation
- MeSH G06.535.770.333 – peptide biosynthesis, nucleic acid-independent
- MeSH G06.535.770.871 – protein biosynthesis
- MeSH G06.535.770.871.200 – frameshifting, ribosomal
- MeSH G06.535.770.871.640 – peptide chain elongation, translational
- MeSH G06.535.770.871.650 – peptide chain initiation, translational
- MeSH G06.535.770.871.720 – peptide chain termination, translational
- MeSH G06.535.770.871.790 – protein modification, translational
- MeSH G06.535.770.871.790.600 – protein processing, post-translational
- MeSH G06.535.770.871.790.600.400 – protein isoprenylation
- MeSH G06.535.770.871.790.600.700 – protein splicing
- MeSH G06.535.770.871.850 – transfer rna aminoacylation

==== MeSH G06.535.780 – pharmacokinetics ====
- MeSH G06.535.780.101 – area under curve
- MeSH G06.535.780.151 – biological availability
- MeSH G06.535.780.202 – biotransformation
- MeSH G06.535.780.202.640 – metabolic clearance rate
- MeSH G06.535.780.202.820 – metabolic detoxication, drug
- MeSH G06.535.780.202.820.500 – metabolic detoxication, phase i
- MeSH G06.535.780.202.820.750 – metabolic detoxication, phase ii
- MeSH G06.535.780.559 – therapeutic equivalency
- MeSH G06.535.780.917 – tissue distribution

==== MeSH G06.535.790 – phosphorylation ====
- MeSH G06.535.790.550 – oxidative phosphorylation
- MeSH G06.535.790.605 – photophosphorylation

==== MeSH G06.535.839 – rna processing, post-transcriptional ====
- MeSH G06.535.839.225 – rna 3' end processing
- MeSH G06.535.839.225.710 – polyadenylation
- MeSH G06.535.839.250 – rna editing
- MeSH G06.535.839.700 – rna splicing
- MeSH G06.535.839.700.100 – alternative splicing
- MeSH G06.535.839.700.750 – trans-splicing

=== MeSH G06.696 – nutrition ===
==== MeSH G06.696.259 – child nutrition ====
- MeSH G06.696.259.500 – adolescent nutrition
- MeSH G06.696.259.750 – infant nutrition
- MeSH G06.696.259.750.249 – bottle feeding
- MeSH G06.696.259.750.500 – breast feeding
- MeSH G06.696.259.750.750 – weaning

==== MeSH G06.696.384 – diet ====
- MeSH G06.696.384.093 – diet, mediterranean
- MeSH G06.696.384.188 – diet, vegetarian
- MeSH G06.696.384.188.500 – diet, macrobiotic
- MeSH G06.696.384.250 – energy intake
- MeSH G06.696.384.250.150 – caloric restriction

==== MeSH G06.696.560 – maternal nutrition ====
- MeSH G06.696.560.624 – prenatal nutrition

==== MeSH G06.696.741 – nutritive value ====
- MeSH G06.696.741.500 – glycemic index

The list continues at List of MeSH codes (G07).
