= 5′ flanking region =

Region of DNA adjacent to the 5′ end of the gene

The 5′ flanking region is a region of DNA adjacent to the 5′ end of the gene. The 5′ flanking region contains the promoter and may contain enhancers or other protein-binding sites. It is the region of DNA that is not transcribed into RNA. This region, not to be confused with the 5′ untranslated region, is not transcribed into RNA or translated into a functional protein. These regions' primary function is the regulation of gene transcription. 5′ flanking regions are categorized between prokaryotes and eukaryotes.

Structure of a eukaryotic gene. 5′ flanking region is shown in yellow on the left of the DNA strand. Since it is not transcribed, it is no longer present in the RNA or protein form.

== Eukaryotic elements ==
In eukaryotes, the 5′ flanking region has complex regulatory elements such as enhancers, silencers, and promoters. The primary promoter element in eukaryotes is the TATA box. Other promoter elements in eukaryotic 5′ flanking regions include initiator elements, downstream core promoter elements, CAAT box, and the GC box.

=== Enhancer ===
Enhancers are DNA sequences found in 5′ flanking regions of eukaryotic genes that affect transcription. If a transcription factor binds to an enhancer in a 5′ flanking region, the DNA strand bends in a way that the transcription factor bound to the enhancer can also bind the promoter of a gene. This leads to RNA polymerase recruitment and interaction with transcription factors and the promoter, and an overall higher transcription rate than the basal level. Although enhancers are usually present upstream of the transcription start site, they can be present anywhere on or around the gene of interest.

=== Silencer ===
Silencers are DNA sequences found in the 5′ flanking region of eukaryotic genes, assisting in the silencing of a gene. They can be found upstream, downstream, or within the gene of interest. When repressors bind silencers, they act similarly as enhancers and bend over to prevent the interaction of RNA polymerase with promoters. This silences the gene, and therefore, the gene will not be expressed in the cell.

=== TATA box ===
The TATA box is present in all genes transcribed by RNA polymerase II, which is most eukaryotic genes. The binding of the TATA box with the TATA binding protein initiates the formation of a transcription factor complex. This is followed by the binding of transcription factor TFIID, which then recruits TFIIB, TFIIF, RNA polymerase II, and TFIIH (in that order) to form an initiation complex. It is typically 10 nucleotides long and is present -30 to -20 nucleotides upstream from the transcription start site in the core promoter region.

=== CAAT box ===
The CAAT box is a crucial element of the 5′ flanking region of eukaryotic genomes. A specific transcription factor called CAAT-binding protein binds to this region and aids in transcription in eukaryotes. It is typically 10 nucleotides long and is present -80 to -70 nucleotides upstream from the transcription start site in the proximal promoter region.

== Prokaryotic elements ==
Prokaryotes have only three promoter elements: two elements are present -35 and -10 nucleotides upstream of the transcription start site, and the third is directly upstream of the transcription start site. Prokaryotic promoter elements are not identical among species but have a consensus sequence of 6 nucleotides each. Bacterial RNA polymerase binds to these regions to align itself and begin transcription. Promoter sequences that differ from the consensus sequence are generally transcribed less efficiently. Additionally, induced mutations in these -35 and -10 promoter sequences have proven deleterious to transcription.

== Polymorphisms ==
Flanking SNPs are Single nucleotide polymorphisms (SNP) that appear in the flanking region. Polymorphisms in this region can lead to changes in the regulation of transcription. They have also been associated with several diseases. A 12 base pair insertion in the 5′ flanking region of the Cystatin B gene has been linked to some individuals with Unverricht-Lundborg disease. Polymorphisms in the 5′ flanking region of the DRD4 gene have been linked to ADHD, schizophrenia, and methamphetamine abuse. Insertions and deletions in the 5′ flanking region of the insulin gene have been associated with type 2 diabetes. Polymorphisms in the 5′ flanking region of the gene coding for oxytocin have been linked to mutations in promoter function, ultimately leading to potential disorders related to altered oxytocin levels and functionality.
