= List of MeSH codes (G08) =

The following is a partial list of the "G" codes for Medical Subject Headings (MeSH), as defined by the United States National Library of Medicine (NLM).

This list continues the information at List of MeSH codes (G07). Codes following these are found at List of MeSH codes (G09). For other MeSH codes, see List of MeSH codes.

The source for this content is the set of 2006 MeSH Trees from the NLM.

== MeSH G08 – reproductive and urinary physiology ==
=== MeSH G08.520 – reproduction ===
==== MeSH G08.520.170 – embryonic and fetal development ====
- MeSH G08.520.170.104 – embryonic development
- MeSH G08.520.170.104.249 – cell lineage
- MeSH G08.520.170.104.500 – embryo implantation
- MeSH G08.520.170.104.500.100 – embryo implantation, delayed
- MeSH G08.520.170.104.750 – embryonic induction
- MeSH G08.520.170.104.875 – twinning, monozygotic
- MeSH G08.520.170.157 – fetal development
- MeSH G08.520.170.157.374 – fetal movement
- MeSH G08.520.170.157.750 – fetal organ maturity
- MeSH G08.520.170.157.875 – fetal viability
- MeSH G08.520.170.157.937 – fetal weight
- MeSH G08.520.170.157.968 – gestational age
- MeSH G08.520.170.450 – organogenesis
- MeSH G08.520.170.520 – sex differentiation

==== MeSH G08.520.188 – estrous cycle ====
- MeSH G08.520.188.249 – anestrus
- MeSH G08.520.188.374 – diestrus
- MeSH G08.520.188.500 – estrus
- MeSH G08.520.188.500.500 – estrus synchronization
- MeSH G08.520.188.750 – metestrus
- MeSH G08.520.188.875 – proestrus

==== MeSH G08.520.277 – fertilization ====
- MeSH G08.520.277.360 – ovum transport
- MeSH G08.520.277.760 – sperm capacitation
- MeSH G08.520.277.780 – sperm motility
- MeSH G08.520.277.800 – sperm-ovum interactions
- MeSH G08.520.277.800.100 – acrosome reaction
- MeSH G08.520.277.820 – sperm transport

==== MeSH G08.520.310 – gametogenesis ====
- MeSH G08.520.310.500 – oogenesis
- MeSH G08.520.310.500.880 – vitellogenesis
- MeSH G08.520.310.760 – spermatogenesis
- MeSH G08.520.310.760.700 – sperm maturation

==== MeSH G08.520.363 – insemination ====
- MeSH G08.520.363.492 – insemination, artificial

==== MeSH G08.520.440 – menstrual cycle ====
- MeSH G08.520.440.154 – fertile period
- MeSH G08.520.440.310 – follicular phase
- MeSH G08.520.440.310.358 – follicular atresia
- MeSH G08.520.440.410 – luteal phase
- MeSH G08.520.440.428 – menstruation
- MeSH G08.520.440.508 – ovulation
- MeSH G08.520.440.508.080 – anovulation
- MeSH G08.520.440.508.355 – luteinization
- MeSH G08.520.440.508.355.500 – corpus luteum maintenance
- MeSH G08.520.440.508.380 – luteolysis
- MeSH G08.520.440.508.493 – ovulation inhibition
- MeSH G08.520.440.508.768 – superovulation

==== MeSH G08.520.734 – postpartum period ====
- MeSH G08.520.734.500 – lactation
- MeSH G08.520.734.500.460 – milk ejection

==== MeSH G08.520.769 – pregnancy ====
- MeSH G08.520.769.213 – gravidity
- MeSH G08.520.769.326 – labor, obstetric
- MeSH G08.520.769.326.100 – cervical ripening
- MeSH G08.520.769.326.200 – labor onset
- MeSH G08.520.769.326.200.080 – labor stage, first
- MeSH G08.520.769.326.200.090 – labor stage, second
- MeSH G08.520.769.326.200.110 – labor stage, third
- MeSH G08.520.769.326.280 – trial of labor
- MeSH G08.520.769.326.700 – uterine contraction
- MeSH G08.520.769.362 – labor presentation
- MeSH G08.520.769.362.150 – breech presentation
- MeSH G08.520.769.408 – maternal age
- MeSH G08.520.769.408.770 – pregnancy in adolescence
- MeSH G08.520.769.455 – maternal-fetal exchange
- MeSH G08.520.769.472 – parity
- MeSH G08.520.769.490 – parturition
- MeSH G08.520.769.490.500 – term birth
- MeSH G08.520.769.491 – placentation
- MeSH G08.520.769.498 – pregnancy, animal
- MeSH G08.520.769.498.300 – litter size
- MeSH G08.520.769.500 – pregnancy, high-risk
- MeSH G08.520.769.520 – pregnancy maintenance
- MeSH G08.520.769.520.500 – corpus luteum maintenance
- MeSH G08.520.769.525 – pregnancy, multiple
- MeSH G08.520.769.525.508 – quadruplets
- MeSH G08.520.769.525.550 – quintuplets
- MeSH G08.520.769.525.608 – superfetation
- MeSH G08.520.769.525.680 – triplets
- MeSH G08.520.769.525.847 – twins
- MeSH G08.520.769.525.847.800 – twins, dizygotic
- MeSH G08.520.769.525.847.838 – twins, monozygotic
- MeSH G08.520.769.530 – pregnancy outcome
- MeSH G08.520.769.530.249 – live birth
- MeSH G08.520.769.530.500 – stillbirth
- MeSH G08.520.769.540 – pregnancy rate
- MeSH G08.520.769.550 – pregnancy trimesters
- MeSH G08.520.769.550.408 – pregnancy trimester, first
- MeSH G08.520.769.550.490 – pregnancy trimester, second
- MeSH G08.520.769.550.520 – pregnancy trimester, third
- MeSH G08.520.769.570 – pregnancy, unplanned
- MeSH G08.520.769.580 – pregnancy, unwanted
- MeSH G08.520.769.600 – prenatal nutrition
- MeSH G08.520.769.887 – pseudopregnancy

==== MeSH G08.520.830 – reproduction, asexual ====
- MeSH G08.520.830.500 – parthenogenesis

==== MeSH G08.520.891 – reproductive behavior ====
- MeSH G08.520.891.500 – contraception behavior

==== MeSH G08.520.950 – sexual behavior ====
- MeSH G08.520.950.139 – coitus
- MeSH G08.520.950.139.300 – coitus interruptus
- MeSH G08.520.950.279 – courtship
- MeSH G08.520.950.295 – extramarital relations
- MeSH G08.520.950.526 – masturbation
- MeSH G08.520.950.790 – prostitution
- MeSH G08.520.950.845 – safe sex
- MeSH G08.520.950.900 – sexual abstinence
- MeSH G08.520.950.950 – sexual harassment
- MeSH G08.520.950.975 – sexuality
- MeSH G08.520.950.975.200 – bisexuality
- MeSH G08.520.950.975.400 – heterosexuality
- MeSH G08.520.950.975.500 – homosexuality
- MeSH G08.520.950.975.500.400 – homosexuality, female
- MeSH G08.520.950.975.500.600 – homosexuality, male
- MeSH G08.520.950.987 – unsafe sex

==== MeSH G08.520.960 – sexual development ====
- MeSH G08.520.960.249 – climacteric
- MeSH G08.520.960.249.249 – andropause
- MeSH G08.520.960.249.500 – menopause
- MeSH G08.520.960.249.500.500 – menopause, premature
- MeSH G08.520.960.249.500.562 – perimenopause
- MeSH G08.520.960.249.500.625 – postmenopause
- MeSH G08.520.960.249.500.812 – premenopause
- MeSH G08.520.960.374 – puberty
- MeSH G08.520.960.374.204 – adrenarche
- MeSH G08.520.960.374.410 – menarche
- MeSH G08.520.960.500 – sex differentiation
- MeSH G08.520.960.750 – sexual maturation

=== MeSH G08.852 – urinary tract physiology ===
==== MeSH G08.852.241 – diuresis ====
- MeSH G08.852.241.557 – natriuresis

==== MeSH G08.852.950 – urodynamics ====
The list continues at List of MeSH codes (G09).
