= List of MeSH codes (G09) =

The following is a partial list of the "G" codes for Medical Subject Headings (MeSH), as defined by the United States National Library of Medicine (NLM).

This list continues the information at List of MeSH codes (G08). Codes following these are found at List of MeSH codes (G10). For other MeSH codes, see List of MeSH codes.

The source for this content is the set of 2006 MeSH Trees from the NLM.

== MeSH G09 – circulatory and respiratory physiology ==
=== MeSH G09.188 – blood physiology ===
==== MeSH G09.188.250 – blood physiologic phenomena ====
- MeSH G09.188.250.051 – acid-base equilibrium
- MeSH G09.188.250.106 – bleeding time
- MeSH G09.188.250.133 – blood bactericidal activity
- MeSH G09.188.250.161 – blood cell count
- MeSH G09.188.250.161.330 – erythrocyte count
- MeSH G09.188.250.161.330.725 – reticulocyte count
- MeSH G09.188.250.161.595 – leukocyte count
- MeSH G09.188.250.161.595.500 – lymphocyte count
- MeSH G09.188.250.161.595.500.150 – cd4 lymphocyte count
- MeSH G09.188.250.161.595.500.150.160 – cd4-cd8 ratio
- MeSH G09.188.250.161.700 – platelet count
- MeSH G09.188.250.272 – blood viscosity
- MeSH G09.188.250.313 – blood volume
- MeSH G09.188.250.313.370 – erythrocyte volume
- MeSH G09.188.250.313.610 – plasma volume
- MeSH G09.188.250.340 – erythrocyte deformability
- MeSH G09.188.250.350 – erythrocyte indices
- MeSH G09.188.250.400 – hematocrit
- MeSH G09.188.250.640 – osmotic fragility
- MeSH G09.188.250.660 – partial thromboplastin time
- MeSH G09.188.250.670 – platelet adhesiveness
- MeSH G09.188.250.680 – prothrombin time
- MeSH G09.188.250.760 – reticulocytosis
- MeSH G09.188.250.840 – thrombin time
- MeSH G09.188.250.960 – whole blood coagulation time

==== MeSH G09.188.261 – blood physiologic processes ====
- MeSH G09.188.261.145 – blood bactericidal activity
- MeSH G09.188.261.420 – erythrocyte aggregation
- MeSH G09.188.261.454 – erythrocyte aging
- MeSH G09.188.261.544 – hematopoiesis
- MeSH G09.188.261.544.414 – erythropoiesis
- MeSH G09.188.261.544.463 – hematopoiesis, extramedullary
- MeSH G09.188.261.544.597 – leukopoiesis
- MeSH G09.188.261.544.597.500 – lymphopoiesis
- MeSH G09.188.261.544.597.750 – myelopoiesis
- MeSH G09.188.261.544.798 – thrombopoiesis
- MeSH G09.188.261.560 – hemostasis
- MeSH G09.188.261.560.150 – blood coagulation
- MeSH G09.188.261.560.150.390 – fibrinolysis
- MeSH G09.188.261.560.600 – platelet activation
- MeSH G09.188.261.560.600.180 – clot retraction
- MeSH G09.188.261.560.600.500 – platelet adhesiveness
- MeSH G09.188.261.560.600.640 – platelet aggregation
- MeSH G09.188.261.780 – phagocytosis

=== MeSH G09.330 – cardiovascular physiology ===
==== MeSH G09.330.553 – cardiovascular physiologic phenomena ====
- MeSH G09.330.553.199 – capillary fragility
- MeSH G09.330.553.299 – capillary permeability
- MeSH G09.330.553.349 – cardiovascular deconditioning
- MeSH G09.330.553.400 – hemodynamic phenomena
- MeSH G09.330.553.400.095 – blood flow velocity
- MeSH G09.330.553.400.114 – blood pressure
- MeSH G09.330.553.400.114.695 – pulmonary wedge pressure
- MeSH G09.330.553.400.114.732 – venous pressure
- MeSH G09.330.553.400.114.732.336 – central venous pressure
- MeSH G09.330.553.400.114.732.650 – portal pressure
- MeSH G09.330.553.400.164 – blood viscosity
- MeSH G09.330.553.400.214 – blood volume
- MeSH G09.330.553.400.214.370 – erythrocyte volume
- MeSH G09.330.553.400.214.610 – plasma volume
- MeSH G09.330.553.400.280 – cardiac output
- MeSH G09.330.553.400.280.882 – stroke volume
- MeSH G09.330.553.400.330 – cardiac volume
- MeSH G09.330.553.400.509 – heart rate
- MeSH G09.330.553.400.509.430 – heart rate, fetal
- MeSH G09.330.553.400.515 – heart sounds
- MeSH G09.330.553.400.515.500 – heart murmurs
- MeSH G09.330.553.400.650 – pulse
- MeSH G09.330.553.400.925 – valsalva maneuver
- MeSH G09.330.553.400.928 – vascular capacitance
- MeSH G09.330.553.400.931 – vascular resistance
- MeSH G09.330.553.400.931.327 – capillary resistance
- MeSH G09.330.553.400.977 – ventricular pressure
- MeSH G09.330.553.920 – vascular patency

==== MeSH G09.330.582 – cardiovascular physiologic processes ====
- MeSH G09.330.582.075 – atrial function
- MeSH G09.330.582.075.100 – atrial function, left
- MeSH G09.330.582.075.200 – atrial function, right
- MeSH G09.330.582.163 – blood circulation
- MeSH G09.330.582.163.159 – cerebrovascular circulation
- MeSH G09.330.582.163.248 – collateral circulation
- MeSH G09.330.582.163.324 – coronary circulation
- MeSH G09.330.582.163.645 – microcirculation
- MeSH G09.330.582.163.749 – placental circulation
- MeSH G09.330.582.163.770 – pulmonary circulation
- MeSH G09.330.582.163.780 – regional blood flow
- MeSH G09.330.582.163.812 – renal circulation
- MeSH G09.330.582.163.812.700 – renal blood flow, effective
- MeSH G09.330.582.163.812.740 – renal plasma flow
- MeSH G09.330.582.163.812.750 – renal plasma flow, effective
- MeSH G09.330.582.163.881 – splanchnic circulation
- MeSH G09.330.582.163.881.552 – liver circulation
- MeSH G09.330.582.400 – hemodynamic processes
- MeSH G09.330.582.400.090 – baroreflex
- MeSH G09.330.582.400.500 – kallikrein-kinin system
- MeSH G09.330.582.400.750 – renin–angiotensin system
- MeSH G09.330.582.400.920 – vasoconstriction
- MeSH G09.330.582.400.925 – vasodilation
- MeSH G09.330.582.541 – myocardial contraction
- MeSH G09.330.582.541.295 – diastole
- MeSH G09.330.582.541.880 – systole
- MeSH G09.330.582.751 – neovascularization, physiologic
- MeSH G09.330.582.962 – ventricular function
- MeSH G09.330.582.962.800 – ventricular function, left
- MeSH G09.330.582.962.900 – ventricular function, right
- MeSH G09.330.582.962.950 – ventricular pressure
- MeSH G09.330.582.962.975 – ventricular remodeling

=== MeSH G09.772 – respiratory physiology ===
==== MeSH G09.772.765 – respiratory physiologic phenomena ====
- MeSH G09.772.765.060 – airway resistance
- MeSH G09.772.765.540 – lung compliance
- MeSH G09.772.765.600 – pulmonary diffusing capacity
- MeSH G09.772.765.650 – pulmonary ventilation
- MeSH G09.772.765.650.300 – forced expiratory flow rates
- MeSH G09.772.765.650.300.590 – maximal expiratory flow rate
- MeSH G09.772.765.650.300.630 – maximal expiratory flow-volume curves
- MeSH G09.772.765.650.300.670 – maximal midexpiratory flow rate
- MeSH G09.772.765.650.300.790 – peak expiratory flow rate
- MeSH G09.772.765.650.430 – forced expiratory volume
- MeSH G09.772.765.650.630 – maximal voluntary ventilation
- MeSH G09.772.765.760 – respiratory dead space
- MeSH G09.772.765.765 – respiratory sounds
- MeSH G09.772.765.850 – total lung capacity
- MeSH G09.772.765.850.250 – closing volume
- MeSH G09.772.765.850.390 – functional residual capacity
- MeSH G09.772.765.850.390.360 – expiratory reserve volume
- MeSH G09.772.765.850.390.820 – residual volume
- MeSH G09.772.765.850.970 – vital capacity
- MeSH G09.772.765.850.970.360 – expiratory reserve volume
- MeSH G09.772.765.850.970.500 – inspiratory capacity
- MeSH G09.772.765.850.970.500.375 – inspiratory reserve volume
- MeSH G09.772.765.850.970.500.700 – tidal volume
- MeSH G09.772.765.910 – valsalva maneuver
- MeSH G09.772.765.920 – ventilation-perfusion ratio
- MeSH G09.772.765.925 – voice
- MeSH G09.772.765.925.960 – voice quality
- MeSH G09.772.765.962 – work of breathing

==== MeSH G09.772.770 – respiratory physiologic processes ====
- MeSH G09.772.770.580 – mucociliary clearance
- MeSH G09.772.770.680 – phonation
- MeSH G09.772.770.690 – pulmonary circulation
- MeSH G09.772.770.755 – respiration
- MeSH G09.772.770.755.700 – respiratory mechanics
- MeSH G09.772.770.755.700.080 – bronchoconstriction
- MeSH G09.772.770.755.700.275 – exhalation
- MeSH G09.772.770.755.700.390 – inhalation
- MeSH G09.772.770.755.760 – respiratory transport
- MeSH G09.772.770.755.760.602 – pulmonary gas exchange
- MeSH G09.772.770.820 – sneezing
- MeSH G09.772.770.980 – yawning

The list continues at List of MeSH codes (G10).
