= List of MeSH codes (G07) =

The following is a partial list of the "G" codes for Medical Subject Headings (MeSH), as defined by the United States National Library of Medicine (NLM).

This list continues the information at List of MeSH codes (G06). Codes following these are found at List of MeSH codes (G08). For other MeSH codes, see List of MeSH codes.

The source for this content is the set of 2006 MeSH Trees from the NLM.

== MeSH G07 – physiological processes ==
=== MeSH G07.062 – adaptation, physiological ===
- MeSH G07.062.133 – acclimatization
- MeSH G07.062.415 – estivation
- MeSH G07.062.592 – hibernation

=== MeSH G07.290 – body constitution ===
- MeSH G07.290.100 – body weights and measures
- MeSH G07.290.100.125 – body mass index
- MeSH G07.290.100.160 – body size
- MeSH G07.290.100.160.100 – body height
- MeSH G07.290.100.160.120 – body weight
- MeSH G07.290.100.160.120.186 – birth weight
- MeSH G07.290.100.160.120.300 – fetal weight
- MeSH G07.290.100.160.120.699 – overweight
- MeSH G07.290.100.160.120.699.500 – obesity
- MeSH G07.290.100.160.120.699.500.500 – obesity, morbid
- MeSH G07.290.100.160.120.828 – thinness
- MeSH G07.290.100.231 – body surface area
- MeSH G07.290.100.250 – crown-rump length
- MeSH G07.290.100.660 – organ size
- MeSH G07.290.100.803 – skinfold thickness
- MeSH G07.290.100.960 – waist-hip ratio
- MeSH G07.290.250 – disease susceptibility
- MeSH G07.290.800 – somatotypes

=== MeSH G07.315 – body temperature ===
- MeSH G07.315.232 – body temperature regulation
- MeSH G07.315.232.450 – hibernation
- MeSH G07.315.232.693 – sweating
- MeSH G07.315.232.778 – thermogenesis
- MeSH G07.315.232.778.500 – shivering
- MeSH G07.315.753 – skin temperature

=== MeSH G07.382 – cell physiology ===
- MeSH G07.382.374 – cell cycle
- MeSH G07.382.374.220 – cell division
- MeSH G07.382.374.220.220 – cell nucleus division
- MeSH G07.382.374.220.220.500 – anaphase
- MeSH G07.382.374.220.220.625 – chromosome segregation
- MeSH G07.382.374.220.220.687 – meiosis
- MeSH G07.382.374.220.220.687.500 – meiotic prophase i
- MeSH G07.382.374.220.220.687.500.299 – chromosome pairing
- MeSH G07.382.374.220.220.687.500.299.500 – synaptonemal complex
- MeSH G07.382.374.220.220.687.500.600 – pachytene stage
- MeSH G07.382.374.220.220.750 – metaphase
- MeSH G07.382.374.220.220.781 – mitosis
- MeSH G07.382.374.220.220.781.050 – anaphase
- MeSH G07.382.374.220.220.781.625 – metaphase
- MeSH G07.382.374.220.220.781.812 – prometaphase
- MeSH G07.382.374.220.220.781.906 – prophase
- MeSH G07.382.374.220.220.781.953 – telophase
- MeSH G07.382.374.220.220.812 – prometaphase
- MeSH G07.382.374.220.220.875 – prophase
- MeSH G07.382.374.220.220.875.500 – meiotic prophase i
- MeSH G07.382.374.220.220.875.500.299 – chromosome pairing
- MeSH G07.382.374.220.220.875.500.299.500 – synaptonemal complex
- MeSH G07.382.374.220.220.875.500.600 – pachytene stage
- MeSH G07.382.374.220.220.937 – telophase
- MeSH G07.382.374.220.250 – cytokinesis
- MeSH G07.382.374.500 – interphase
- MeSH G07.382.374.500.300 – g0 phase
- MeSH G07.382.374.500.320 – g1 phase
- MeSH G07.382.374.500.340 – g2 phase
- MeSH G07.382.374.500.800 – s phase
- MeSH G07.382.750 – cell differentiation
- MeSH G07.382.750.324 – adipogenesis
- MeSH G07.382.750.650 – gametogenesis
- MeSH G07.382.750.650.249 – oogenesis
- MeSH G07.382.750.650.249.880 – vitellogenesis
- MeSH G07.382.750.650.624 – spermatogenesis
- MeSH G07.382.750.650.624.700 – sperm maturation
- MeSH G07.382.843 – cell growth processes
- MeSH G07.382.843.500 – cell enlargement
- MeSH G07.382.843.750 – cell proliferation
- MeSH G07.382.843.750.500 – cell division
- MeSH G07.382.843.750.500.220 – cell nucleus division
- MeSH G07.382.843.750.500.220.500 – anaphase
- MeSH G07.382.843.750.500.220.625 – chromosome segregation
- MeSH G07.382.843.750.500.220.687 – meiosis
- MeSH G07.382.843.750.500.220.687.500 – meiotic prophase i
- MeSH G07.382.843.750.500.220.687.500.299 – chromosome pairing
- MeSH G07.382.843.750.500.220.687.500.299.500 – synaptonemal complex
- MeSH G07.382.843.750.500.220.687.500.600 – pachytene stage
- MeSH G07.382.843.750.500.220.750 – metaphase
- MeSH G07.382.843.750.500.220.781 – mitosis
- MeSH G07.382.843.750.500.220.781.050 – anaphase
- MeSH G07.382.843.750.500.220.781.625 – metaphase
- MeSH G07.382.843.750.500.220.781.812 – prometaphase
- MeSH G07.382.843.750.500.220.781.906 – prophase
- MeSH G07.382.843.750.500.220.781.953 – telophase
- MeSH G07.382.843.750.500.220.812 – prometaphase
- MeSH G07.382.843.750.500.220.875 – prophase
- MeSH G07.382.843.750.500.220.875.500 – meiotic prophase i
- MeSH G07.382.843.750.500.220.875.500.299 – chromosome pairing
- MeSH G07.382.843.750.500.220.875.500.299.500 – synaptonemal complex
- MeSH G07.382.843.750.500.220.875.500.600 – pachytene stage
- MeSH G07.382.843.750.500.220.937 – telophase
- MeSH G07.382.843.750.500.250 – cytokinesis
- MeSH G07.382.875 – cell lineage
- MeSH G07.382.968 – cell shape
- MeSH G07.382.984 – cell size

=== MeSH G07.450 – chronobiology ===
- MeSH G07.450.125 – biological clocks
- MeSH G07.450.730 – periodicity
- MeSH G07.450.730.190 – circadian rhythm
- MeSH G07.450.730.190.025 – activity cycles

=== MeSH G07.453 – electrophysiology ===
- MeSH G07.453.390 – electric capacitance
- MeSH G07.453.401 – electric conductivity
- MeSH G07.453.401.350 – electric impedance
- MeSH G07.453.450 – evoked potentials
- MeSH G07.453.450.250 – contingent negative variation
- MeSH G07.453.450.350 – event-related potentials, p300
- MeSH G07.453.450.370 – evoked potentials, auditory
- MeSH G07.453.450.370.223 – cochlear microphonic potentials
- MeSH G07.453.450.370.300 – evoked potentials, auditory, brain stem
- MeSH G07.453.450.385 – evoked potentials, motor
- MeSH G07.453.450.400 – evoked potentials, somatosensory
- MeSH G07.453.450.425 – evoked potentials, visual
- MeSH G07.453.450.440 – excitatory postsynaptic potentials
- MeSH G07.453.697 – membrane potentials
- MeSH G07.453.697.100 – action potentials
- MeSH G07.453.697.100.570 – myoelectric complex, migrating

=== MeSH G07.574 – growth and development ===
- MeSH G07.574.124 – aging
- MeSH G07.574.124.519 – longevity
- MeSH G07.574.249 – growth
- MeSH G07.574.249.314 – body size
- MeSH G07.574.249.314.100 – body height
- MeSH G07.574.249.314.120 – body weight
- MeSH G07.574.249.314.120.186 – birth weight
- MeSH G07.574.249.314.120.200 – body weight changes
- MeSH G07.574.249.314.120.200.926 – weight gain
- MeSH G07.574.249.314.120.200.963 – weight loss
- MeSH G07.574.249.314.120.300 – fetal weight
- MeSH G07.574.249.314.120.699 – overweight
- MeSH G07.574.249.314.120.699.500 – obesity
- MeSH G07.574.249.314.120.699.500.500 – obesity, morbid
- MeSH G07.574.249.314.120.828 – thinness
- MeSH G07.574.249.410 – cell growth processes
- MeSH G07.574.249.410.500 – cell enlargement
- MeSH G07.574.249.410.750 – cell proliferation
- MeSH G07.574.249.410.750.500 – cell division
- MeSH G07.574.249.410.750.500.220 – cell nucleus division
- MeSH G07.574.249.410.750.500.220.500 – anaphase
- MeSH G07.574.249.410.750.500.220.625 – chromosome segregation
- MeSH G07.574.249.410.750.500.220.687 – meiosis
- MeSH G07.574.249.410.750.500.220.687.500 – meiotic prophase i
- MeSH G07.574.249.410.750.500.220.687.500.299 – chromosome pairing
- MeSH G07.574.249.410.750.500.220.687.500.299.500 – synaptonemal complex
- MeSH G07.574.249.410.750.500.220.687.500.600 – pachytene stage
- MeSH G07.574.249.410.750.500.220.750 – metaphase
- MeSH G07.574.249.410.750.500.220.781 – mitosis
- MeSH G07.574.249.410.750.500.220.781.050 – anaphase
- MeSH G07.574.249.410.750.500.220.781.625 – metaphase
- MeSH G07.574.249.410.750.500.220.781.812 – prometaphase
- MeSH G07.574.249.410.750.500.220.781.906 – prophase
- MeSH G07.574.249.410.750.500.220.781.953 – telophase
- MeSH G07.574.249.410.750.500.220.812 – prometaphase
- MeSH G07.574.249.410.750.500.220.875 – prophase
- MeSH G07.574.249.410.750.500.220.875.500 – meiotic prophase i
- MeSH G07.574.249.410.750.500.220.875.500.299 – chromosome pairing
- MeSH G07.574.249.410.750.500.220.875.500.299.500 – synaptonemal complex
- MeSH G07.574.249.410.750.500.220.875.500.600 – pachytene stage
- MeSH G07.574.249.410.750.500.220.937 – telophase
- MeSH G07.574.249.410.750.500.250 – cytokinesis
- MeSH G07.574.249.690 – organ size
- MeSH G07.574.249.845 – tropism
- MeSH G07.574.249.845.400 – gravitropism
- MeSH G07.574.249.845.700 – phototropism
- MeSH G07.574.374 – human development
- MeSH G07.574.374.500 – adolescent development
- MeSH G07.574.374.750 – child development
- MeSH G07.574.500 – morphogenesis
- MeSH G07.574.500.100 – body patterning
- MeSH G07.574.500.100.250 – embryonic induction
- MeSH G07.574.500.325 – embryonic and fetal development
- MeSH G07.574.500.325.089 – ectogenesis
- MeSH G07.574.500.325.180 – embryonic development
- MeSH G07.574.500.325.180.500 – cell lineage
- MeSH G07.574.500.325.180.750 – embryonic induction
- MeSH G07.574.500.325.235 – fetal development
- MeSH G07.574.500.325.235.374 – fetal movement
- MeSH G07.574.500.325.235.750 – fetal organ maturity
- MeSH G07.574.500.325.235.875 – fetal viability
- MeSH G07.574.500.325.235.937 – fetal weight
- MeSH G07.574.500.325.235.968 – gestational age
- MeSH G07.574.500.325.377 – organogenesis
- MeSH G07.574.500.325.377.249 – fetal organ maturity
- MeSH G07.574.500.325.377.500 – lymphangiogenesis
- MeSH G07.574.500.325.377.625 – musculoskeletal development
- MeSH G07.574.500.325.377.625.100 – bone development
- MeSH G07.574.500.325.377.625.100.175 – calcification, physiologic
- MeSH G07.574.500.325.377.625.100.478 – maxillofacial development
- MeSH G07.574.500.325.377.625.100.729 – osteogenesis
- MeSH G07.574.500.325.377.625.180 – chondrogenesis
- MeSH G07.574.500.325.377.625.590 – muscle development
- MeSH G07.574.500.325.377.750 – odontogenesis
- MeSH G07.574.500.325.377.750.190 – amelogenesis
- MeSH G07.574.500.325.377.750.325 – cementogenesis
- MeSH G07.574.500.325.377.750.461 – dentinogenesis
- MeSH G07.574.500.325.520 – sex differentiation
- MeSH G07.574.500.550 – metamorphosis, biological
- MeSH G07.574.500.550.500 – life cycle stages
- MeSH G07.574.500.550.500.500 – larva
- MeSH G07.574.500.550.500.650 – nymph
- MeSH G07.574.500.550.500.700 – pupa
- MeSH G07.574.500.550.750 – molting

=== MeSH G07.621 – homeostasis ===
- MeSH G07.621.110 – acid-base equilibrium
- MeSH G07.621.265 – body temperature regulation
- MeSH G07.621.265.500 – thermogenesis
- MeSH G07.621.487 – feedback, biochemical
- MeSH G07.621.487.500 – down-regulation
- MeSH G07.621.487.750 – up-regulation
- MeSH G07.621.500 – heat-shock response
- MeSH G07.621.888 – water-electrolyte balance
- MeSH G07.621.888.500 – kallikrein-kinin system
- MeSH G07.621.888.750 – water loss, insensible

=== MeSH G07.810 – somatotypes ===
The list continues at List of MeSH codes (G08).
