= List of MeSH codes (G11) =

The following is a partial list of the "G" codes for Medical Subject Headings (MeSH), as defined by the United States National Library of Medicine (NLM).

This list continues the information at List of MeSH codes (G10). Codes following these are found at List of MeSH codes (G12). For other MeSH codes, see List of MeSH codes.

The source for this content is the set of 2006 MeSH Trees from the NLM.

== MeSH G11 – musculoskeletal, neural, and ocular physiology ==
=== MeSH G11.427 – musculoskeletal physiology ===
==== MeSH G11.427.713 – musculoskeletal physiologic phenomena ====
- MeSH G11.427.713.100 – bone density
- MeSH G11.427.713.340 – hand strength
- MeSH G11.427.713.570 – muscle fatigue
- MeSH G11.427.713.580 – muscle tonus
- MeSH G11.427.713.590 – musculoskeletal equilibrium
- MeSH G11.427.713.690 – physical endurance
- MeSH G11.427.713.690.134 – anaerobic threshold
- MeSH G11.427.713.690.270 – exercise tolerance
- MeSH G11.427.713.700 – posture
- MeSH G11.427.713.700.300 – head-down tilt
- MeSH G11.427.713.700.525 – prone position
- MeSH G11.427.713.700.625 – supine position
- MeSH G11.427.713.760 – range of motion, articular

==== MeSH G11.427.792 – musculoskeletal physiologic processes ====
- MeSH G11.427.792.195 – bone remodeling
- MeSH G11.427.792.195.140 – bone regeneration
- MeSH G11.427.792.195.140.570 – osseointegration
- MeSH G11.427.792.195.150 – bone resorption
- MeSH G11.427.792.195.150.570 – osteolysis
- MeSH G11.427.792.280 – exertion
- MeSH G11.427.792.280.306 – exercise
- MeSH G11.427.792.530 – movement
- MeSH G11.427.792.530.140 – eye movements
- MeSH G11.427.792.530.281 – flight, animal
- MeSH G11.427.792.530.389 – gait
- MeSH G11.427.792.530.478 – head movements
- MeSH G11.427.792.530.568 – locomotion
- MeSH G11.427.792.530.568.610 – running
- MeSH G11.427.792.530.568.610.320 – jogging
- MeSH G11.427.792.530.568.800 – swimming
- MeSH G11.427.792.530.568.900 – walking
- MeSH G11.427.792.530.568.900.500 – dependent ambulation
- MeSH G11.427.792.530.698 – motor activity
- MeSH G11.427.792.530.698.555 – freezing reaction, cataleptic
- MeSH G11.427.792.530.698.610 – running
- MeSH G11.427.792.530.698.610.320 – jogging
- MeSH G11.427.792.530.698.680 – immobility response, tonic
- MeSH G11.427.792.530.698.800 – swimming
- MeSH G11.427.792.530.698.940 – walking
- MeSH G11.427.792.530.748 – pronation
- MeSH G11.427.792.530.780 – supination
- MeSH G11.427.792.540 – muscle contraction
- MeSH G11.427.792.540.472 – isometric contraction
- MeSH G11.427.792.540.493 – isotonic contraction
- MeSH G11.427.792.540.554 – muscle relaxation
- MeSH G11.427.792.540.554.250 – diastole
- MeSH G11.427.792.540.570 – myocardial contraction
- MeSH G11.427.792.540.570.295 – diastole
- MeSH G11.427.792.540.570.880 – systole
- MeSH G11.427.792.540.890 – uterine contraction
- MeSH G11.427.792.560 – musculoskeletal development
- MeSH G11.427.792.560.100 – bone development
- MeSH G11.427.792.560.100.175 – calcification, physiologic
- MeSH G11.427.792.560.100.478 – maxillofacial development
- MeSH G11.427.792.560.100.729 – osteogenesis
- MeSH G11.427.792.560.180 – chondrogenesis
- MeSH G11.427.792.560.590 – muscle development

=== MeSH G11.561 – nervous system physiology ===
==== MeSH G11.561.065 – arousal ====
- MeSH G11.561.065.738 – wakefulness

==== MeSH G11.561.131 – cerebrospinal fluid pressure ====
- MeSH G11.561.131.505 – intracranial pressure

==== MeSH G11.561.232 – dominance, cerebral ====
- MeSH G11.561.232.508 – laterality

==== MeSH G11.561.250 – evoked potentials ====
- MeSH G11.561.250.250 – contingent negative variation
- MeSH G11.561.250.350 – event-related potentials, p300
- MeSH G11.561.250.370 – evoked potentials, auditory
- MeSH G11.561.250.370.223 – cochlear microphonic potentials
- MeSH G11.561.250.370.300 – evoked potentials, auditory, brain stem
- MeSH G11.561.250.385 – evoked potentials, motor
- MeSH G11.561.250.400 – evoked potentials, somatosensory
- MeSH G11.561.250.425 – evoked potentials, visual
- MeSH G11.561.250.440 – excitatory postsynaptic potentials

==== MeSH G11.561.450 – membrane potentials ====
- MeSH G11.561.450.100 – action potentials
- MeSH G11.561.450.100.570 – myoelectric complex, migrating

==== MeSH G11.561.537 – neural conduction ====
- MeSH G11.561.537.678 – recruitment (neurology)
- MeSH G11.561.537.700 – refractory period, neurologic

==== MeSH G11.561.594 – neuronal plasticity ====
- MeSH G11.561.594.340 – long-term depression (physiology)
- MeSH G11.561.594.350 – long-term potentiation

==== MeSH G11.561.730 – reflex ====
- MeSH G11.561.730.063 – baroreflex
- MeSH G11.561.730.127 – blinking
- MeSH G11.561.730.251 – gagging
- MeSH G11.561.730.482 – piloerection
- MeSH G11.561.730.580 – reflex, abdominal
- MeSH G11.561.730.587 – reflex, abnormal
- MeSH G11.561.730.594 – reflex, acoustic
- MeSH G11.561.730.643 – reflex, monosynaptic
- MeSH G11.561.730.643.474 – h-reflex
- MeSH G11.561.730.685 – reflex, oculocardiac
- MeSH G11.561.730.705 – reflex, pupillary
- MeSH G11.561.730.768 – reflex, stretch
- MeSH G11.561.730.795 – reflex, vestibulo-ocular
- MeSH G11.561.730.869 – startle reaction

==== MeSH G11.561.796 – sensation ====
- MeSH G11.561.796.255 – gravity perception
- MeSH G11.561.796.263 – hearing
- MeSH G11.561.796.263.260 – auditory perception
- MeSH G11.561.796.263.260.500 – speech perception
- MeSH G11.561.796.263.398 – bone conduction
- MeSH G11.561.796.263.570 – otoacoustic emissions, spontaneous
- MeSH G11.561.796.444 – pain
- MeSH G11.561.796.444.350 – arthralgia
- MeSH G11.561.796.444.700 – pain threshold
- MeSH G11.561.796.541 – proprioception
- MeSH G11.561.796.541.587 – kinesthesis
- MeSH G11.561.796.541.595 – musculoskeletal equilibrium
- MeSH G11.561.796.643 – smell
- MeSH G11.561.796.724 – taste
- MeSH G11.561.796.724.880 – taste threshold
- MeSH G11.561.796.781 – temperature sense
- MeSH G11.561.796.850 – touch
- MeSH G11.561.796.850.682 – stereognosis
- MeSH G11.561.796.929 – vision
- MeSH G11.561.796.929.300 – phosphenes
- MeSH G11.561.796.929.800 – vision, entoptic

==== MeSH G11.561.826 – sleep ====
- MeSH G11.561.826.587 – sleep deprivation
- MeSH G11.561.826.754 – sleep stages
- MeSH G11.561.826.754.671 – sleep, rem

==== MeSH G11.561.854 – speech ====
- MeSH G11.561.854.650 – speech acoustics
- MeSH G11.561.854.686 – speech intelligibility

=== MeSH G11.697 – ocular physiology ===
==== MeSH G11.697.677 – ocular physiologic phenomena ====
- MeSH G11.697.677.040 – afterimage
- MeSH G11.697.677.264 – dominance, ocular
- MeSH G11.697.677.330 – evoked potentials, visual
- MeSH G11.697.677.340 – eye color
- MeSH G11.697.677.360 – figural aftereffect
- MeSH G11.697.677.370 – flicker fusion
- MeSH G11.697.677.400 – glare
- MeSH G11.697.677.600 – intraocular pressure
- MeSH G11.697.677.800 – refraction, ocular
- MeSH G11.697.677.911 – vision
- MeSH G11.697.677.911.500 – phosphenes
- MeSH G11.697.677.911.700 – vision, binocular
- MeSH G11.697.677.911.730 – vision, entoptic
- MeSH G11.697.677.911.780 – vision, monocular
- MeSH G11.697.677.911.800 – visual acuity
- MeSH G11.697.677.911.800.110 – contrast sensitivity
- MeSH G11.697.677.911.830 – visual fields
- MeSH G11.697.677.930 – vision disparity

==== MeSH G11.697.716 – ocular physiologic processes ====
- MeSH G11.697.716.079 – accommodation, ocular
- MeSH G11.697.716.154 – adaptation, ocular
- MeSH G11.697.716.154.371 – dark adaptation
- MeSH G11.697.716.182 – blinking
- MeSH G11.697.716.260 – eye movements
- MeSH G11.697.716.260.217 – convergence, ocular
- MeSH G11.697.716.260.253 – fixation, ocular
- MeSH G11.697.716.260.378 – nystagmus, physiologic
- MeSH G11.697.716.260.378.500 – nystagmus, optokinetic
- MeSH G11.697.716.260.453 – pursuit, smooth
- MeSH G11.697.716.260.500 – saccades
- MeSH G11.697.716.755 – phototransduction
- MeSH G11.697.716.877 – visual perception
- MeSH G11.697.716.877.231 – color perception
- MeSH G11.697.716.877.317 – depth perception
- MeSH G11.697.716.877.622 – form perception
- MeSH G11.697.716.877.811 – motion perception
- MeSH G11.697.716.877.905 – pattern recognition, visual

The list continues at List of MeSH codes (G12).
