= List of MeSH codes (G13) =

The following is a partial list of the "G" codes for Medical Subject Headings (MeSH), as defined by the United States National Library of Medicine (NLM).

This list continues the information at List of MeSH codes (G12). Codes following these are found at List of MeSH codes (G14). For other MeSH codes, see List of MeSH codes.

The source for this content is the set of 2006 MeSH Trees from the NLM.

== MeSH G13 – genetic phenomena ==
=== MeSH G13.330 – gene frequency ===
- MeSH G13.330.159 – gene flow
- MeSH G13.330.320 – genetic drift

=== MeSH G13.370 – genomic instability ===
- MeSH G13.370.180 – chromosome instability
- MeSH G13.370.180.180 – chromosome fragility

=== MeSH G13.380 – genotype ===
- MeSH G13.380.350 – gene dosage
- MeSH G13.380.355 – genetic predisposition to disease
- MeSH G13.380.360 – haplotypes
- MeSH G13.380.383 – heterozygote
- MeSH G13.380.554 – homozygote

=== MeSH G13.420 – inheritance patterns ===
- MeSH G13.420.040 – anticipation, genetic
- MeSH G13.420.275 – extrachromosomal inheritance
- MeSH G13.420.275.500 – genes, mitochondrial
- MeSH G13.420.320 – genes, dominant
- MeSH G13.420.325 – genes, recessive
- MeSH G13.420.457 – genes, x-linked
- MeSH G13.420.523 – genes, y-linked
- MeSH G13.420.590 – multifactorial inheritance
- MeSH G13.420.720 – quantitative trait, heritable

=== MeSH G13.540 – linkage (genetics) ===
- MeSH G13.540.500 – linkage disequilibrium
- MeSH G13.540.562 – lod score

=== MeSH G13.695 – phenotype ===
- MeSH G13.695.450 – genetic markers
- MeSH G13.695.650 – penetrance

=== MeSH G13.700 – ploidies ===
- MeSH G13.700.131 – aneuploidy
- MeSH G13.700.131.500 – monosomy
- MeSH G13.700.131.750 – trisomy
- MeSH G13.700.264 – diploidy
- MeSH G13.700.456 – haploidy
- MeSH G13.700.740 – polyploidy

=== MeSH G13.810 – sequence homology ===
- MeSH G13.810.200 – sequence homology, amino acid
- MeSH G13.810.550 – sequence homology, nucleic acid
- MeSH G13.810.550.830 – synteny

=== MeSH G13.920 – variation (genetics) ===
- MeSH G13.920.036 – antibody diversity
- MeSH G13.920.073 – antigenic variation
- MeSH G13.920.331 – genetic heterogeneity
- MeSH G13.920.590 – mutation
- MeSH G13.920.590.029 – allelic imbalance
- MeSH G13.920.590.029.530 – loss of heterozygosity
- MeSH G13.920.590.029.530.175 – chromosome deletion
- MeSH G13.920.590.060 – base pair mismatch
- MeSH G13.920.590.120 – codon, nonsense
- MeSH G13.920.590.175 – chromosome aberrations
- MeSH G13.920.590.175.050 – aneuploidy
- MeSH G13.920.590.175.050.500 – monosomy
- MeSH G13.920.590.175.050.750 – trisomy
- MeSH G13.920.590.175.125 – chimerism
- MeSH G13.920.590.175.165 – chromosomal instability
- MeSH G13.920.590.175.165.180 – chromosome fragility
- MeSH G13.920.590.175.175 – chromosome breakage
- MeSH G13.920.590.175.177 – chromosome deletion
- MeSH G13.920.590.175.420 – inversion, chromosome
- MeSH G13.920.590.175.430 – isochromosomes
- MeSH G13.920.590.175.570 – micronuclei, chromosome-defective
- MeSH G13.920.590.175.595 – mosaicism
- MeSH G13.920.590.175.760 – ring chromosomes
- MeSH G13.920.590.175.815 – sex chromosome aberrations
- MeSH G13.920.590.175.815.970 – xyy karyotype
- MeSH G13.920.590.175.870 – translocation, genetic
- MeSH G13.920.590.175.870.680 – philadelphia chromosome
- MeSH G13.920.590.175.935 – uniparental disomy
- MeSH G13.920.590.220 – dna repeat expansion
- MeSH G13.920.590.220.865 – trinucleotide repeat expansion
- MeSH G13.920.590.300 – frameshift mutation
- MeSH G13.920.590.310 – gene amplification
- MeSH G13.920.590.320 – gene duplication
- MeSH G13.920.590.335 – genomic instability
- MeSH G13.920.590.350 – germline mutation
- MeSH G13.920.590.650 – mutation, missense
- MeSH G13.920.590.675 – point mutation
- MeSH G13.920.590.762 – sequence deletion
- MeSH G13.920.590.762.180 – chromosome deletion
- MeSH G13.920.590.762.320 – gene deletion
- MeSH G13.920.590.835 – suppression, genetic
- MeSH G13.920.795 – polymorphism, genetic
- MeSH G13.920.795.595 – polymorphism, restriction fragment length
- MeSH G13.920.795.600 – polymorphism, single-stranded conformational
- MeSH G13.920.795.800 – polymorphism, single nucleotide

The list continues at List of MeSH codes (G14).
