= List of MeSH codes (G12) =

The following is a partial list of the "G" codes for Medical Subject Headings (MeSH), as defined by the United States National Library of Medicine (NLM).

This list continues the information at List of MeSH codes (G11). Codes following these are found at List of MeSH codes (G13). For other MeSH codes, see List of MeSH codes.

The source for this content is the set of 2006 MeSH Trees from the NLM.

== MeSH G12 – chemical and pharmacologic phenomena ==
=== MeSH G12.091 – biopharmaceutics ===
- MeSH G12.091.690 – pharmacokinetics
- MeSH G12.091.690.064 – area under curve
- MeSH G12.091.690.129 – biological availability
- MeSH G12.091.690.140 – biotransformation
- MeSH G12.091.690.140.595 – metabolic clearance rate
- MeSH G12.091.690.140.600 – metabolic detoxication, drug
- MeSH G12.091.690.140.600.500 – metabolic detoxication, phase i
- MeSH G12.091.690.140.600.750 – metabolic detoxication, phase ii
- MeSH G12.091.690.898 – therapeutic equivalency
- MeSH G12.091.690.949 – tissue distribution

=== MeSH G12.361 – drug interactions ===
- MeSH G12.361.310 – drug antagonism
- MeSH G12.361.477 – drug synergism
- MeSH G12.361.511 – food-drug interactions
- MeSH G12.361.755 – herb-drug interactions

=== MeSH G12.392 – drug resistance ===
- MeSH G12.392.269 – drug resistance, microbial
- MeSH G12.392.269.347 – drug resistance, bacterial
- MeSH G12.392.269.347.500 – beta-lactam resistance
- MeSH G12.392.269.347.500.175 – cephalosporin resistance
- MeSH G12.392.269.347.500.600 – penicillin resistance
- MeSH G12.392.269.347.500.600.050 – ampicillin resistance
- MeSH G12.392.269.347.500.600.525 – methicillin resistance
- MeSH G12.392.269.347.750 – chloramphenicol resistance
- MeSH G12.392.269.347.812 – drug resistance, multiple, bacterial
- MeSH G12.392.269.347.875 – kanamycin resistance
- MeSH G12.392.269.347.937 – tetracycline resistance
- MeSH G12.392.269.347.968 – trimethoprim resistance
- MeSH G12.392.269.347.984 – vancomycin resistance
- MeSH G12.392.269.383 – drug resistance, fungal
- MeSH G12.392.269.383.500 – drug resistance, multiple, fungal
- MeSH G12.392.269.420 – drug resistance, viral
- MeSH G12.392.269.420.500 – drug resistance, multiple, viral
- MeSH G12.392.300 – drug resistance, multiple
- MeSH G12.392.300.500 – drug resistance, multiple, bacterial
- MeSH G12.392.300.625 – drug resistance, multiple, fungal
- MeSH G12.392.300.750 – drug resistance, multiple, viral
- MeSH G12.392.395 – drug resistance, neoplasm
- MeSH G12.392.491 – insecticide resistance
- MeSH G12.392.617 – insulin resistance

=== MeSH G12.454 – drug tolerance ===
- MeSH G12.454.910 – tachyphylaxis

=== MeSH G12.869 – structure-activity relationship ===
- MeSH G12.869.500 – quantitative structure-activity relationship

=== MeSH G12.955 – up-regulation ===
The list continues at List of MeSH codes (G13).
