= List of MeSH codes (G10) =

The following is a partial list of the "G" codes for Medical Subject Headings (MeSH), as defined by the United States National Library of Medicine (NLM).

This list continues the information at List of MeSH codes (G09). Codes following these are found at List of MeSH codes (G11). For other MeSH codes, see List of MeSH codes.

The source for this content is the set of 2006 MeSH Trees from the NLM.

== MeSH G10 – digestive, oral, and skin physiology ==
=== MeSH G10.261 – digestive physiology ===
- MeSH G10.261.082 – appetite
- MeSH G10.261.082.290 – appetite regulation
- MeSH G10.261.206 – defecation
- MeSH G10.261.248 – deglutition
- MeSH G10.261.302 – digestion
- MeSH G10.261.350 – drinking
- MeSH G10.261.396 – eating
- MeSH G10.261.470 – gallbladder emptying
- MeSH G10.261.482 – gastrointestinal motility
- MeSH G10.261.482.400 – gastric emptying
- MeSH G10.261.482.525 – gastrointestinal transit
- MeSH G10.261.482.570 – myoelectric complex, migrating
- MeSH G10.261.482.596 – peristalsis
- MeSH G10.261.530 – hunger
- MeSH G10.261.576 – intestinal absorption
- MeSH G10.261.642 – liver regeneration
- MeSH G10.261.692 – mastication
- MeSH G10.261.777 – postprandial period
- MeSH G10.261.862 – salivation

=== MeSH G10.549 – dental physiology ===
- MeSH G10.549.140 – dental caries susceptibility
- MeSH G10.549.164 – dental enamel solubility
- MeSH G10.549.202 – dental occlusion
- MeSH G10.549.242 – dentin solubility
- MeSH G10.549.688 – tooth calcification
- MeSH G10.549.726 – tooth eruption
- MeSH G10.549.764 – tooth exfoliation
- MeSH G10.549.803 – tooth migration
- MeSH G10.549.803.535 – mesial movement of teeth
- MeSH G10.549.841 – tooth mobility
- MeSH G10.549.879 – tooth permeability
- MeSH G10.549.879.292 – dental enamel permeability
- MeSH G10.549.879.461 – dentin permeability
- MeSH G10.549.917 – tooth resorption
- MeSH G10.549.917.653 – root resorption

=== MeSH G10.795 – skin physiology ===
- MeSH G10.795.261 – galvanic skin response
- MeSH G10.795.280 – hair color
- MeSH G10.795.499 – piloerection
- MeSH G10.795.633 – skin absorption
- MeSH G10.795.668 – skin aging
- MeSH G10.795.704 – skin pigmentation
- MeSH G10.795.775 – skin temperature
- MeSH G10.795.869 – sweating

The list continues at List of MeSH codes (G11).
