= Fetal movement =

Physical activity of the fetus in utero

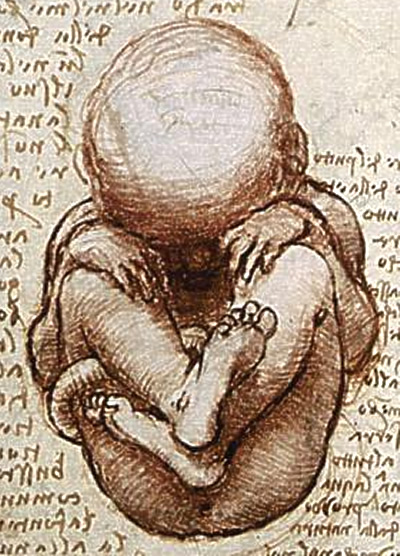
The human fetus moves throughout its entire development.

Fetal movement refers to motion of a fetus caused by its own muscle activity. Locomotor activity begins during the late embryological stage and changes in nature throughout development. Muscles begin to move as soon as they are innervated. These first movements are not reflexive, but arise from self-generated nerve impulses originating in the spinal cord. As the nervous system matures, muscles can move in response to stimuli.

Generally speaking, fetal motility can be classified as either elicited or spontaneous, and spontaneous movements may be triggered by either the spine or the brain. Whether a movement is supraspinally determined can be inferred by comparison to movements of an anencephalic fetus.

This article primarily deals with voluntary and reflex movements. Ages are given as age from fertilization rather than as gestational age.

Some sources contend that there is no voluntary movement until after birth. Other sources say that purposive movement begins months earlier. 3D ultrasound has been used to create motion pictures of fetal movement, which are called "4D ultrasound".

== Movement during development ==
=== First trimester ===
==== Embryonic stage ====
An embryo of a gestational age of 9 weeks and 0 days. The head is directed to the right in the image. The heart is discerned in the center of the embryo. A hand is visible slightly above.

Even before the fetal stage begins, a six-week-old human embryo can arch its back and neck. By seven weeks, movement in the arms and legs can be detected by ultrasound.

==== Fetal stage ====
Fetal movements at the end of first trimester (early fetal stage) detected by 3D ultrasound

The parts of the fetal brain that control movement will not fully form until late in the second trimester, and the first part of the third trimester. Control of movement is limited at birth, and purposeful voluntary movements develop during the long period up until puberty. According to an overview produced by the Royal College of Physicians of Edinburgh, purposive movement begins at about 18 weeks, gradually replacing reflex movements, and purposeful voluntary movements then develop further after birth.

In these early movements, the limbs move together; they begin to move independently by the ninth week as the controlling neurons in the spinal cord develop. At week 11, the fetus can open its mouth and suck its fingers; at week 12, it begins to swallow amniotic fluid.

In addition to sideward bendings of the head, complex and generalized movements occur at the beginning of the fetal stage, with movements and startles that involve the whole body. Movement of hands, hips and knees have been observed at nine weeks, stretches and yawns at ten weeks, and isolated limb movements beginning shortly thereafter.

=== Second trimester ===
By about the twelfth week, the fetus is able to kick and curl its toes, and may grasp its feet or scratch itself with its fingernails. It can also move in response to a touch on its skin. Also starting about week 12, the thoracic diaphragm moves up and down as if the fetus were breathing, but this movement disappears about week 16 and does not resume until the third trimester.

Movements such as kicking continue, and the mother usually feels movement for the first time, an event called quickening, during the fifth month. Around this time, limb movements become more complex, with flexing of the joints and ribs. This activity assists with proper joint development. Women who have already given birth have more relaxed uterine muscles that are consequently more sensitive to fetal motion, and for them fetal motion can sometimes be felt as early as 14 weeks.

By about week 21, the fetus begins to develop a regular schedule of movement. The startle reflex is present in half of all fetuses by week 24 and in all fetuses by week 28. Movement is restricted around this time because the fetus has grown so large it has little space for kicking or changing body position.

=== Third trimester ===
In later pregnancy, a complex motion called "stepping" develops. This movement consists of circular "bicycling" motion of legs, which helps the fetus move to a head-down position in preparation for birth.

== Variation in activity level ==
Fetuses aged 14 to 18 weeks show a pronounced circadian rhythm in their activity level, which can be detected both by fetal electrocardiogram and by measuring locomotor activity. Active and quiet periods for the fetus do not correspond to those of the mother; fetuses are most active from 9 a.m. to 2 p.m. and again from 7 p.m. to 4 a.m. During the last four to six weeks before birth, most of the fetus's kicking and jabbing movements occur while it is sleeping lightly.

== Monitoring fetal movement ==
After quickening, a pregnant woman may choose to count the number and types of movements she feels her fetus make. This tally is informally known as a kick count. The American Pregnancy Association states that advantages of conducting kick counts range from giving a pregnant woman an opportunity to bond with her baby to reducing the risk of stillbirth; kick counts are especially recommended in high risk pregnancies. However, instructing women to monitor fetal movements is potentially associated with increased maternal anxiety. 70% of pregnancies with a single episode of reduced fetal movements are uncomplicated.

In the UK, the Royal College of Obstetricians and Gynaecologists say that if you think your baby has stopped moving or is moving less and you are over 28 weeks pregnant you should contact your midwife. Do not wait until the next day to contact the hospital or midwife.
