= Peptide library =

A peptide library is a tool for studying proteins. Peptide libraries typically contain a large number of peptides that have a systematic combination of amino acids. Usually, solid phase synthesis, e.g. resin as a flat surface or beads, is used for peptide library generation. Peptide libraries are a popular tool for experiments in drug design, protein–protein interactions, and other biochemical and pharmaceutical applications.

Synthetic peptide libraries are synthesized without utilizing biological systems such as phage or in vitro translation. There are at least five subtypes of synthetic peptide libraries that differ from each other by the design of the library and/or the method used for the synthesis of the library. The subtypes include:

- Overlapping peptide libraries - in which the entirety of a larger protein is used to produce a library of 8-20 amino acid peptides which overlap; these libraries can be used to identify the specific regions of a larger protein which participate in a given interaction or to provide pre-digested versions of a larger protein for binding.
- Truncation peptide libraries - in which a given peptide is produced with various or all N or C terminal truncations, these smaller fragments can be used to identify the minimal required region of a peptide for a given interaction being studied.
- Random libraries - randomly generated peptides of a set length, or range of lengths, can be used to identify novel binding partners of a target of interest.
- Alanine scanning libraries - in which each amino acid of a given protein or peptide is replaced with an alanine sequentially such that each peptide contains only one alanine mutations but all possible mutations to alanine are present; this can be used to identify critical residues for binding
- Positional or scrambled peptide libraries - in which specific positions in the peptide are substituted for many or all other amino acids such that the effect of each amino acid at that position in the peptide on the binding or other activity of the peptide can be tested. Scrambled libraries are often random peptides and used as negative controls.

Solid phase peptide synthesis is limited to a peptide chain length of approximately 70 amino acids and is generally unsuitable for the study of larger proteins. Many libraries utilize peptide chains much shorter than 70 amino acids. For 20 encoded amino acids at maximally 70 positions, this results in an upper limit of 20^{70}, or more than 10 quindecillion (1×10^{91}), possible combinations, not accounting for the potential use of amino acids with post-translational modifications or amino acids not encoded in the genetic code, such as selenocysteine and pyrrolysine. Peptide libraries generally encompass only a fraction of this diversity, selected for depending on the needs of the experiment, for instance keeping some amino acids constant at certain positions.

Large random peptide libraries are often used for the synthesis of certain peptide molecules, such as ultra-large chemical libraries for the discovery of high-affinity peptide binders. Any increase in the library size severely affects parameters, such as the synthesis scale, the number of library members, the sequence deconvolution and peptide structure elucidation. To mitigate these technical challenges, an algorithm-supported approach to peptide library design may use molecular mass and amino acid diversity to simplify the laborious permutation identification in complex mixtures when using mass spectrometry. This approach is used to avoid mass redundancy.

Biological reagent companies, such as Pepscan, ProteoGenix, Mimotopes, GenScript and many others, manufacture customized peptide libraries.

== Example ==
A peptide chain of 10 residues in length is used in native chemical ligation with a larger recombinantly expressed protein.

- Residue 1: alanine
- Residue 2: one of glutamine, glycine, arginine, glutamic acid, serine, or methionine
- Residue 3: any one of the 20 amino acids
- Residue 4: acetyllysine
- Residue 5: alanine
- Residue 6: isoleucine
- Residue 7: aspartic acid
- Residue 8: phenylalanine
- Residue 9: acetyllysine
- Residue 10: arginine with the carboxy terminal thioester

With 7 possibilities at Residue 2 and 20 possibilities at Residue 3, the total would be $20\times7$ or 140 different polypeptides in the library.

This peptide library would be useful for analyzing the effect of the post-translational modification acetylation on lysine which neutralizes the positive charge. Having the library of different peptides at residue 2 and 3 would let the investigator see if some change in chemical properties in the N-terminal tail of the ligated protein makes the protein more useful or useful in a different way.
