= American Pregnancy Association =

American anti-abortion non-profit organisation

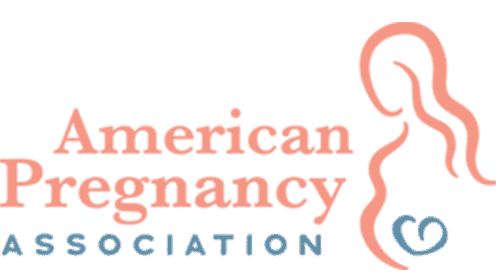
- Established: 1995; 31 years ago
- Founders: Mike Sheaffer; Annie Sheaffer
- Type: Nonprofit
- Tax ID no.: 32-0072669
- Headquarters: Irving, Texas, U.S.
- Website: americanpregnancy.org
- Formerly called: America's Pregnancy Helpline

American Pregnancy Association is a non-profit anti-abortion organization that provides information on pregnancy and reproduction to pregnant people in order to discourage abortion. It is based in Irving, Texas, U.S.

== History ==
American Pregnancy Association was founded in 1995 as America's Pregnancy Helpline by Mike and Annie Sheaffer.

Between 1995 and 2003, it worked as a helpline that provided information internationally to about 147,000 women and families and encouraged pregnant people to not have abortions.

In 2003, it was converted into a non-profit organization, named American Pregnancy Association. It was led by the anti-abortion activist Brad Imler until 2019 when Imler left the organization to start a Christian adoption agency; it has since been led by Lynn Handley. In addition, the organization operates an active website that provides information related to pregnancy and reproduction.

== Controversy ==
The Association's website has been called "rife with medically inaccurate information".

The group has been labeled as an anti-abortion group by reporters and activists.
