= Methylguanosine =

Methylguanosine may refer to:

- 1-Methylguanosine
- 7-Methylguanosine
