= Platelet adhesiveness =

Platelet adhesiveness is the adhesion of platelets to other structures.

It can be contrasted with platelet aggregation, which refers to the processes or factors which lead to the adhesion of platelets to other platelets.

== See also ==
- Platelet membrane glycoprotein
