= Protein carbonylation =

Biochemical processes which introduce C=O groups into proteins

In biochemistry, protein carbonylation refers to oxidation of the side chains of proteins to introduce ketone (>C=O) and aldehyde (−CH=O) groups in a protein. The following amino acid residues are affected:

- prolyl to pyrrolidone
- glutamyl to glutamic semialdehyde
- lysyl to aminoadipic acid semialdehyde
- threonyl to amino ketobutyric acid

Carbonylation is typically assumed to be the result of reactive oxygen species (ROS) attacking the protein side chain. ROS species include hydroperoxide or lipic hydroperoxides. Protein carbonylation is of interest because of its association with various diseases. Oxidative stress, often metal catalyzed, leads to protein carbonylation.
