= Acetyllysine =

- Skeletal formula of acetyllysine (S)

Names
- Other names: 6-Acetamido-2-aminohexanoic acid; 2-Azaniumyl-6-acetamidohexanoate

Identifiers
CAS Number	692-04-6 S
3D model (JSmol)	Interactive image
Beilstein Reference	1725438 S
ChEBI	CHEBI:17752
ChEMBL	ChEMBL1230958
ChemSpider	233732; 83801 S
ECHA InfoCard	100.010.661
EC Number	211-725-9
Gmelin Reference	747339 S
KEGG	C02727
MeSH	N-epsilon-acetyllysine
PubChem CID	265949; 6994067 R; 92832 S
UNII	470AD5VY1X S
CompTox Dashboard (EPA)	DTXSID90862371
- InChI: InChI=1S/C8H16N2O3/c1-6(11)10-5-3-2-4-7(9)8(12)13/h7H,2-5,9H2,1H3,(H,10,11)(H,12,13) Key: DTERQYGMUDWYAZ-UHFFFAOYSA-N
- SMILES: CC(=O)NCCCC[C@H](N)C(=O)O

Properties
Chemical formula	C_{8}H_{16}N_{2}O_{3}
Molar mass	188.227 g·mol^{−1}
Appearance	White crystals
Odor	Odourless
Density	1.139 g/mL
Melting point	250 °C (482 °F; 523 K)
Boiling point	442 °C (828 °F; 715 K)
log P	−0.961
Acidity (pK_{a})	2.529
Basicity (pK_{b})	11.468

Related compounds
Related alkanoic acids	Pivagabine
- Except where otherwise noted, data are given for materials in their standard state (at 25 °C [77 °F], 100 kPa). verify (what is ?) Infobox references

Acetyllysine (or acetylated lysine) is an acetyl-derivative of the amino acid lysine. There are multiple forms of acetyllysine: this article is about N-ε-acetyl-L-lysine; another form is N-α-acetyl-L-lysine.

In proteins, the acetylation of lysine residues is an important mechanism of epigenetics. It functions by regulating the binding of histones to DNA in nucleosomes and thereby controlling the expression of genes on that DNA. Non-histone proteins are acetylated as well. Unlike the functionally similar methyllysine, acetyllysine does not carry a positive charge on its side chain.

Histone acetyltransferases (HATs) catalyze the addition of acetyl groups from acetyl-CoA onto certain lysine residues of histones and non-histone proteins. Histone deacetylases (HDACs) catalyze the removal of acetyl groups from acetylated lysines.

Acetyllysine can be synthesized from lysine by the selective acetylation of the terminal amine group.
