= GC box =

In molecular biology, a GC box, also known as a GSG box, is a distinct pattern of nucleotides found in the promoter region of some eukaryotic genes. The GC box is upstream of the TATA box, and approximately 110 bases upstream from the transcription initiation site. It has a consensus sequence GGGCGG which is position-dependent and orientation-independent. The GC elements are bound by transcription factors and have similar functions to enhancers. Some known GC box-binding proteins include Sp1, Krox/Egr, Wilms' tumor, MIGI, and CREA.

The GC box is commonly the binding site for zinc finger proteins. An alpha helix section of the protein corresponds with a major groove in the DNA. Zinc-fingers bind to triplet base pair sequences, with residue 21 binding to the first base pair, residue 18 binding to the second base pair, and residue 15 binding to the third base pair. The triplet base pairs can either be a GGG or a GCG. If residue 18 is a histidine, it will bind to a G, and if residue 18 is a glutamate, it will bind to a C. GC box-binding zinc fingers have between 2 and 4 fingers, making them interact with base pair sequences that are 6 to 8 base pairs in length.
