= VDRE =

Vitamin D response element (VDRE) is a type of DNA sequence that is found in the promoter region of vitamin D regulated genes. This sequence binds the vitamin D receptor (VDR), when complexed with calcitriol (1,25(OH)_{2}D), the active form of vitamin D, and so regulates the expression of many genes.

These response elements typically consist of two conserved hexameric half-sites separated by a three nucleotide spacer, referred to as a DR3 (for direct repeat spaced by 3 type element). The sequence of a VDRE can have a strong influence on the degree of protein binding, particularly at the fifth position in the half-site, and many studies have focused on synthetic variations of response elements and not naturally occurring sequences.

The VDR is widely distributed in tissues, and is not restricted to those tissues considered the classic targets of vitamin D. The VDR upon binding to 1,25(OH)_{2}D heterodimerizes with other nuclear hormone receptors, in particular the family of retinoid X receptors. This VDR/RXR heterodimer complex binds to the specific VDRE in the promoters of genes which it regulates. A variety of additional proteins called coactivators complex with the activated VDR/RXR heterodimers either to form a bridge from the VDR/RXR complex binding to the VDRE to the proteins responsible for transcription such as RNA polymerase II binding to the transcription start site or to help unravel the chromatin at the site of the gene via recruitment of histone acetyl transferases (HAT), allowing transcription to proceed.
