= Synergistic enhancer (antiretroviral) =

Synergistic enhancers of antiretrovirals usually do not possess any antiretroviral properties alone, but when they are taken concurrently with antiretroviral drugs they enhance the effect of that drug.

== Types ==
One of these is an over-the-counter nutritional supplement and another two of these have been FDA approved (for other indications). The effects of these drugs, however, will require further evaluation before being clinically exploited.

Chloroquine/quinoline antimalarials
Chloroquine is being investigated as a synergistic enhancer of protease inhibitors. The mechanism underlying the effects of chloroquine on response to protease inhibitorsis inhibition of cellular drug efflux pumps. The effects of the antimalarial drugs, however, will require further evaluation before being clinically exploited.
Grapefruit juice
Grapefruit juice is a common natural plant extract. The enzyme CYP3A4, a member of the Cytochrome P450 enzyme family, is present mostly in the liver but also in the lining of the gastrointestinal (GI) tract. One of the functions of CYP3A4 is to metabolise, or break down, foreign chemicals including many drugs used to treat HIV. Such enzymes present in the GI tract are a first line defense against toxic substances; this allows the body to metabolize away many chemicals before they enter the bloodstream. Grapefruit juice can neutralize CYP3A4 in the GI tract but not significantly in the liver. By pre-treating with grapefruit juice prior to taking protease inhibitors the GI intake and therefore the bioavailabity is increased. The effect, however, is unreliable and results may vary greatly, therefore it is not a standard recommended practice.
Hydroxyurea
Hydroxyurea (HU) is an older medication (an antimetabolite) used for sickle-cell anemia and some other hematologic disorders. It enhances ddI, and to a lesser extent AZT and ddC. One possible explanation is that HU causes cells to spend more time in the "S" phase checkpoint of cellular growth which allows ddI, AZT and ddC into the cell more. In addition HU inhibits ribonucleotide reductase, an enzyme used to break down certain proteins to form the building blocks of DNA called dNTPs. When dNTPs are depleted the cell tries to absorb more but if ddI, AZT or ddC is present it absorbs that due to the similarity, the net effect is more ddI, AZT or ddC enters the cell. HU can result in bone marrow suppression, and there are warnings that using HU with ddI can increase the risk of pancreatitis. The Health and Human Services (HHS) panel in the US is recommending against the use of Hydroxyurea although some doctors are still using it for various reasons.
Leflunomide
Leflunomide has the trade name Arava. It enhances AZT through depleting a dNTP analogous to HU, RV and mycophenolic acid.
Mycophenolic acid
Mycophenolic acid is an inosine-5′-monophosphate dehydrogenase (IMPDH)-inhibitor. It enhances abacavir but reduces the effect of AZT and d4T. Works analogous to HU and RV only the enzyme inhibited is IMPDH which leads to depletion of the dNTP named dGTP which causes cells to take up more abacavir. Mycophenolic acid is currently approved for used in organ transplantation as mycophenolate mofetil, trade name: CellCept. There is some evidence it may also be active against Hepatitis C, making it of particular interest in treatment of HIV-HCV co-infected patients.
Resveratrol
Resveratrol (RV) is a natural product extracted from certain plants. It enhances ddI, and to a lesser extent AZT and ddC in vitro. Like HU, RV also causes cells to spend more time in the "S" phase checkpoint of cellular growth and also inhibits ribonucleotide reductase. RV is generally better tolerated than HU and has fewer side-effects.
Ritonavir
Ritonavir has the trade name Norvir. It enhances other protease inhibitors through the inhibition of CYP3A4, a liver enzyme. While ritonavir is a protease inhibitor, it cannot be used to inhibit HIV significantly by itself at the low doses required to enhance other protease inhibitors. It is the only antiretroviral synergistic enhancer to be FDA-approved specifically for this use.
