= Haplogroup G-M406 =

Human Y-chromosome DNA haplogroup

Haplogroup G2a2b1
- Possible time of origin: Between 15700 YBP and 13300 years BP
- Possible place of origin: Black Sea region (hypothesized from earliest known samples)
- Ancestor: Haplogroup G2a2b (L30/PF3267/S126)
- Descendants: G2a2b1a1a
- Defining mutations: M406 (G2a2b1), L14/S130 (G2a2b1a1a), L645 (G2a2b1a1b2a )

In human genetics, Haplogroup G-M406 is a Y-chromosome haplogroup. G-M406 is a branch of Haplogroup G Y-DNA (M201). More specifically in descending order, G-M406 is a subbranch also of G2 (P287), G2a (P15) and finally G2a2b (L30/S126) Haplogroup G-M406 seems most common in Turkey and Greece. Secondary concentrations of G-M406 are found in the northern and eastern Mediterranean, and it is found in very small numbers in more inland areas of Europe, the Middle East, and the southern Caucasus Mountains area.

== Genetic features ==
A large number of G-M406 persons have the value of 21 at short tandem repeat (STR) marker DYS390, and all G-M406 men will have the M406 SNP mutation which characterizes this group. The 21 at DYS390 is uncommon among G persons outside the G-M406 group. In G-M406 persons, the DYS391 marker has mostly a value of 10, but sometimes 11, and DYS392 is almost always 11 except in one distinct cluster. If a sample meets the criteria indicated for these three markers, it is likely the sample is G-M406.

This M406 SNP was first reported in 2008. The M designation indicates it was first identified at Stanford University. M406 is located on the Y chromosome at position 2809995, reference SNP ID i4000120. The mutation involves a change from T to G.

The SNPs L184 and L185 (respectively 17586994 with a mutation from A to G, and 20922998 with a mutation from C to G) were found to exist in only some members of a M406+ family and are now considered private SNPs with no practical use outside this family.

== Age and origin of G-M406 ==
In April 2021, YFULL estimate that the mutation G-M406 arose between 15700 YBP and 13300 YBP, the TMRCA between all G-M-406 is estimated to be between 13800 YBP and 10700 YBP

=== Ancient DNA ===
The following table lists ancient individuals reported as belonging to G-M406 or one of its subclades. Published assignments and later reanalyses are identified separately. Calendar dates are given as ranges; contextual dates and dates inferred through relatives are not individual radiocarbon measurements. BP denotes years before 1950.

Ancient individuals reported as G-M406 or a downstream lineage
Sample	Date	Site (present-day country)	Archaeological context	Published haplogroup	AADR haplogroup	Sources
CBT013	3639–3528 cal BCE	Çamlıbel Tarlası, Çorum Province, Turkey	Late Chalcolithic	G-FGC5089		
CBT015	3637–3526 cal BCE	Çamlıbel Tarlası, Çorum Province, Turkey	Late Chalcolithic	G-FGC5089	G-M3302	
CBT014	3637–3386 cal BCE	Çamlıbel Tarlası, Çorum Province, Turkey	Late Chalcolithic	G-FGC5089	G-M3302	
IKI037	3634–3381 cal BCE	İkiztepe, Samsun Province, Turkey	Late Chalcolithic	G-M406	G-Z6029	
CBT005	3623–3376 cal BCE	Çamlıbel Tarlası, Çorum Province, Turkey	Late Chalcolithic	G-M406		
ART024	3501–3349 cal BCE	Arslantepe, Malatya Province, Turkey	Late Chalcolithic	G-M406	G-M3317	
ART014	3491–3108 cal BCE	Arslantepe, Malatya Province, Turkey	Late Chalcolithic	G-M406	G-M3317	
CGG_2_022283	c. 2650 BCE (4600 BP; contextual)	Resuloğlu Höyük, Çorum Province, Turkey	Early Bronze Age; preprint	G-M406 (preprint)		
MA2208	2000–1750 BCE (contextual)	Kaman-Kalehöyük, Kırşehir Province, Turkey	Bronze Age		G-M3317	TheYtree: G-Y24772
I14785	1700–1450 BCE (indirect dating through a close relative)	Oylum Höyük, Kilis Province, Turkey	Middle Bronze Age (study label)	G-PF3316		
I19612	850–750 BCE (contextual)	Çavuştepe, Van Province, Turkey	Urartian context	G-M406		
SFI-15	170 cal BCE–17 cal CE	Beirut, Lebanon	Hellenistic–Roman period	G-M3422		YFull: G-Y132816
I12293	200 BCE–100 CE (contextual)	Ksirov, Khatlon, Tajikistan	Kushan-period context in the study	G2a2b1 (G-M406) (2022 reanalysis); low coverage		
R131	1–200 CE (contextual)	Via Paisiello / Necropoli Salaria, Rome, Italy	Roman Imperial period	G-FGC5089	G-BY158585 (below L14)	YFull: G-BY158585 (below L14)
DZN005	50–300 CE (contextual)	Zhinvali, Dusheti, Georgia	Antiquity	G2a2b1a1a2~ (authors’ deposit)		YFull: G-M3317
R11112	1–400 CE (contextual)	Isola Sacra, Portus/Fiumicino, Italy	Roman Imperial period	G2a2b1a1a1	G-Y248555 (= FTA64009)	
R11119	1–400 CE (contextual)	Isola Sacra, Portus/Fiumicino, Italy	Roman Imperial period	G2a2b1a1b1b~	G-Y44432	YFull: G-Y44432
R47	241–341 cal CE	Centocelle, Rome, Italy	Roman Imperial period	G2a2b1		YFull: G-S9591 (S11415 block); AADR quality: Questionable
KIM002	200–400 CE (contextual)	Khimshiaant, Dusheti, Georgia	Late Antiquity	G2a2b1a1b1a (authors’ deposit)		YFull: G-FGC5081
R10654	258–407 cal CE	Klosterneuburg, Lower Austria, Austria	Roman period	G2a2b1a1a1a	G-FGC5185 (Z17084 block)	
I24953 (BLA-ME-1151; 8102)	400–500 CE (contextual)	Necrópolis Blanes, Mérida, Spain	Late Roman / early Migration Period	G-L645		YFull: G-FGC79804
RKF255	5th–6th centuries CE (Gepid-period context)	Rákóczifalva, Hungary	Gepid period, pre-Avar	G2a2b1 / G-FGC5089	G-M3302	
RKF258	5th–6th centuries CE (Gepid-period context)	Rákóczifalva, Hungary	Gepid period, pre-Avar	G2a2b1 / G-M3302	G-M3302	
3B / NIEcap3b	c. 580–630 CE (cemetery context)	Niederstotzingen, Germany	Alemannic context, Merovingian period	G2a2b1 (G-M406)	G-M3317	
I19086	600–666 cal CE	Brusyany-2, Samara Oblast, Russia	Novinki-type context	G-L645		YFull: G-FGC79804
KDA-517 (2039Bolzano(517))	650–700 CE (contextual)	Kiskundorozsma–Daruhalom, Hungary	Avar period		G-Y82047	
KK1-245 / KKper245	650–750 CE (contextual)	Kiskundorozsma–Kettőshatár I, Hungary	Avar period		G-FGC5107 (below FGC5185/L14); quality: Questionable	
MGS488	650–800 CE (contextual, AADR)	Mödling, An der Goldenen Stiege, Austria	Avar period	G-FGC5089	G-Y130402 (below L14)	YFull: G-Y130402 (below L14)
AHPS209W / AHP209	8th–9th centuries CE (contextual)	Bodajk–Homoki dűlő, Fejér, Hungary	Early Middle Ages	G-M3346 (M3302 branch)		YFull: G-M3234
SHE003	772–890 cal CE	Shekshovo 9, Ivanovo Oblast, Russia	Early Middle Ages	G2a2b1a (FGC5089)	G-FGC5185	
I20146 (= I20148)	650–1300 CE (publication’s contextual range)	Stratonikeia–West Church, Muğla Province, Turkey	Byzantine period in the study	G-M3422		YFull: G-FTB39527 (below FTA35613)
ST2552	1000–1286 CE (time group II)	Groenmarkt-2, Sint-Truiden, Belgium	High Middle Ages	G-L14 (G2k-L14)		
ST2913	1000–1286 CE (time group II)	Groenmarkt-2, Sint-Truiden, Belgium	High Middle Ages	G-S9591 (G2k-S9591; S11415 block)		
I14647 (Locus 2; TH15 BF1020)	1100–1300 CE (contextual)	Tilbeşar Höyük, Gaziantep Province, Turkey	Medieval period	G-M406		

Notes:

- Dates are radiocarbon-based or contextual estimates, as indicated.
- Published haplogroups and later reanalyses are identified separately.
- CGG_2_022283 comes from a preprint.
- RKF255 and RKF258 follow the original study’s Gepid-period chronology.
- R47 and KK1-245 are flagged as "Questionable" in AADR.

== Geographical distribution ==
The ability to describe G-M406 distribution accurately is handicapped by the rather recent identification of the defining G-M406 SNP and the resulting paucity of samples tested for M406. Some estimate of G-M406 percentages can be made, however, by noting the percentage of men with STR marker G samples which have the distinctive 21 value at DYS390 found almost exclusively among G persons within G-M406 and making use of samples tested at commercial labs and in research papers.

=== Turkey, Greece and Western Armenia ===
Perhaps about 5% of men in Turkey are G-M406, the highest percentage of the general population in any country yet sampled. This 5% figure is based on the finding of the value of 21 at STR marker DYS390 in 21 of 57 G samples from throughout Turkey. Among G persons, the 21 value is seen overwhelmingly in G-M406 persons. But values other than 21 occur to a small extent in G-M406 persons. So the total G-M406 percentage within Turkish G is likely close to 50 percent, and the 57 SNP-confirmed G samples represent 11% of 523 Turkish samples obtained in the largest study yet conducted of Turkish population genetics.

In adjacent Greece, SNP testing determined that half of eight G samples were G-M406. The G samples represented 5% of 171 Greek samples. In contrast in nearby Crete, G-M406 was only 20% of the 21 G samples, with G samples representing 11% of 193 island samples. Though treated separately in this study, Crete is part of Greece but with a different settlement history. Farther out in the Mediterranean, in a smaller sample size from Cyprus 4 of 7 G samples have the distinctive 21 value seen overwhelmingly in G-M406 persons.

=== Middle East ===
Just to the south of Turkey among the Kurds of Iraq 7 of 14 likely G STR samples in the YHRD database have the value of 21 at DYS390 suggesting half the G population there belongs to G-M406. This relatively high percentage of G-M406 is confined to the country's northern Kurdish region.

Lebanon, Jordan and Palestine also have significant G-M406 populations though small sample sizes make broad conclusions difficult. In one study, 4 of 5 Palestinian G samples have the distinctive DYS390=21 value. In Lebanon, at least 10 of 37 G samples have G-M406 features and are found among all the major religions there. In Jordan, 7 of 15 available G samples have 21 at marker DYS390. None of the G samples among the Druze peoples in these locations have STR marker values typical of G-M406 persons according to recent studies. However, recent testing on Family TreeDNA points to some families whose origins lie in Palestine/Israel, but who have moved to Lebanon or Syria prior to the 1500-1700 period who happen to be carrying around 50-60% of the Druze among the Haplogroup G population in Druze. There is initially reasonable assurance the samples are within the DYS459=8 subgroup (that is also negative for its own DYS392=12 subgroup). Overall, these sets of related subgroups make up a major part of G-M406 men and are negative for the L14 and L645 SNP-defined subgroups. The sample has a few marker values that are a little different and the Druze samples have 22 at DYS390 compared to the more typical 21 in the majority of G-M406 samples. So this is good indirect evidence that at least half of the G among the Druze is G-M406. In Syria, G-M406 seems less common than in the countries closer to the Mediterranean. Only 3 of 17 G samples there have the 21 value discussed.

=== China ===
G-M406 and its subclades G-PF3293, G-M3302 and G-L14 were found in the Hui People of China by 23mofang lab, totaling 0.66% of Hui people samples analyzed.

Of note regarding G-M3302 among the Hui is that all 5 testers actually belong to a much deeper subclade found only (for now) in Shandong Province. The actual clade is G-M3302>M3422>M3240>M3336>FT203871>FT27194>MF344148. The split at FT27194 occurred about 500 BC as estimated by TheYTree.

=== Other areas ===
The largest source of G STR samples from Iran is the YHRD database where only 1 of 340 Iranian samples has a value of 21 for DYS390 together with the other marker values consistent with G-M406 samples. It is possible G-M406 persons in Iran have different STR marker values. The countries that share the Persian Gulf and Gulf of Oman with Iran were the subject of a separate small study which provided STR samples with G patterns similar to those in Iran. But the percentage of G-M406 (based on the 21 value) would seem higher than in Iran in Dubai with half of 6 G samples with 21. None of the three G samples from Yemen and Saudi Arabia had this DYS390 value.

In 2012 a published study on Iranian men "Ancient Migratory Events in the Middle East: New Clues from the Y Chromosome Variation of Modern Iranians" released a study with close to 1,000 Iranian samples. Of these 6.1% were G samples and 0.7% were G-M406+. This implies that up to 0.6 million Iranian men could be G-M406+. This would be the largest or second largest grouping in the world. At least two modern samples of the G-S3950+ branch are known to be of northern Iranian, likely Azeri origin.

In the Nasidze study of the Caucasus Mountains area, his 87 likely G STR samples now in the YHRD database have only 8 samples with the distinctive DYS390 value of 21 that is the overwhelming feature of the G-M406 group. Only in Georgia where 3 of 16 likely G samples have 21 does G-M406 apparently have a significant presence.

The Haplogroup G Project newsletter is gradually summarizing the percentage of G-M406 men in other areas based on the likely or proven G-M406 samples in the project's large project G database. This source has more reliability in identifying the totality of G-M406 samples because it does not rely on the value at STR marker DYS390 as the sole criterion. Of all the samples tested by FTDNA only 5% of G samples have the STR value of 21, and 75% have 22, interestingly 91% of samples of the E3a haplogroup also have the same STR value. See: https://freepages.rootsweb.com/~geneticgenealogy/genealogy/yfreq.htm

The newsletter indicates (in descending order) in Italy 20% of 156 G samples......Spain 15% of 56 G samples.....Netherlands 15% of 20 G samples......Switzerland 8% of 51 G samples.....Iran 6% of 34 G samples....Poland 4% of 75 G samples......France 4% of 46 G samples......Ireland 3% of 29 G samples.......India 3% of 18 G samples.

In addition, a research study which provided Indian and Pakistani STR marker samples did not find that any of the 20 G samples from various groups contained the DYS390=21 value so typical of G-M406. And a study of Sardinia found 7% of 51 G STR samples had the characteristic 21 value. Possibly of significance, half of these "21" samples were found in the asylum land of the ancient Sardinian population in the isolated central highlands which has no evidence of occupation by external colonial powers beginning with the Phoenician period. In the Spanish islands to the west of Sardinia, in another study none of 7 G STR samples from Ibiza are G-M406, but 2 of 4 G samples in Majorca have the DSY390 value of 21. This same study found one 21 value among 25 G Sephardic Jews whose history is intertwined with Spain. Of the 291 STR samples of all types in the YHRD database from Egypt none of the DYS390=21 samples has the same features of known G-M406 samples from other areas of the Mediterranean.

== G-M406 main branches ==
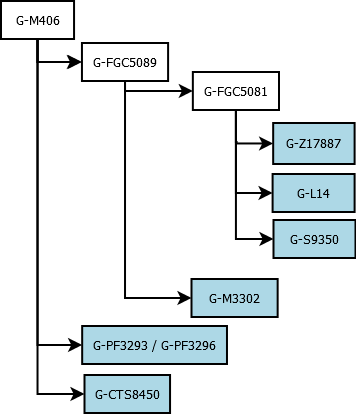

=== G2a2b1a1b - Z17887 ===
Estimated Age : 7800 YBP Descendant branches: G-L645, G-Z17886

==== L645 G2a2b1a1b2a ====
G2a2b1a1b2a is characterized by possessing the SNP mutation designated as L645. G2a2b1a1b2a persons so far all have the value of 9 at STR marker DYS578. Both European and Near Eastern members of this subgroup have been identified. L645 was first identified at Family Tree DNA in summer 2011. It was found at chromosome position 2948673 and represents a mutation from A to C.

==== The DYS436=14 cluster ====
Inside Z17887 there is a cluster of G-M406 men who have the unusual (for G-M406 men) value of 14 at STR marker DYS436 instead of the ancestral 12 value This is so far a relatively small cluster with ancestral histories confined to Galicia and Basque country in Spain and to various parts of Portugal. Too few samples are available to estimate with some reliability when the common male ancestor of this cluster may have lived.. NB : According to familytree DNA M406 collaborative project at least 10 samples have the value of 14 at DYS436 and are not identified as Basque, Portuguese nor Galician

=== G2a2b1a1a - L14 ===
Estimated Age : 7800 YBP Descendant branches: G-Z17084, G-Z45043

G2a2b1a1a is characterized by possessing the SNP mutation designated either as L14 or S130. G2a2b1a1a persons typically have DYF395S1 values of 16,16 and a DYS565 value of 11.

L14 and S130 are different designations for the same SNP mutation. The L14 version was developed at Family Tree DNA, and S130 was developed at Ethnoancestry. But this mutation was first identified at the University of Central Florida in 2006 as U16 and well before the associated researchers published a formal description in 2009 of its location at 21327383 on the Y chromosome, reference number rs35474563. The mutation involves a C to T change.

Another SNP of interest is S133 which was first identified in 2008 at Ethnoancestry in London, England in a G-M406 person, but it is also available as L90 elsewhere. Its location on the Y chromosome is given as 20087688, reference number rs35169834. The mutation is a change from G to A. In the several persons in which this mutation have been found it does not form a separate category from G2a2b1a1a because the tested persons also had the mutation that defines G2a2b1a1a (L14 or S130). It is possible there are persons who are positive (derived) for either L14/S130 while negative (ancestral) for L90/S133, and such a situation would necessitate creating a separate G-M406 category.

=== G2a2b1a1e - S9350 ===
S9350 (renamed G-Z41194 by yfull.com) formed 8000 YBP was first identified in 2013. Its location on the Y chromosome is given as 6834584, reference number rs953306008. The oldest G-S9350 sample known lived in Kaman Kalehöyük, Kırşehir Province in Turkey around 3650 year ago. This was from an ancient Assyrian trading post. According to https://www.yfull.com/tree/G-Z41194/ none of the samples 13 tested positive to date are Turkish, Greek or Italian and this branch is the only M406 branch with Europeans that are not Armenian or Turkish in origin, but the eldest branch line appears to be Lebanese. A further 21 samples at FamilyTreeDNA support this. Sample testing of 50 samples at June 2023 (many do not pay to have public disclosure) across sites have so far shown samples in Iran, Azeris, Palestinian, and Lebanon, all places of ancient Assyrian control. In addition a sub branch exists via Austria, England, Spain and Belgium. This sub branch may have been dispersed via Norman conquest given research. According to familytree DNA M406 Collaborative project, 3 patrilineal descendants of Giorgi Saakadze are from G-Y24444, a subclade of G-S9350

=== G2a2b1a1e - M3302 ===
Estimated Age : 7800 YBP Descendant branch(s): G-BY21756, G-M3422 M3302 was first identified by Underhill et al . Its location on the Y chromosome is given as 12992361, reference number rs576974702.

=== G2a2b1b - PF3293 ===
Estimated Age : 8700 YBP Descendant branch: G-PF3296

==== The DYS454=12 cluster ====
There is a cluster of G-M406 men belonging to the G2a2b1b - PF3293 subgroup who (1) have the unusual (for G-M406 men) value of 12 at STR marker DYS454 instead of the ancestral 11 value (2) and have a relatively close genetic distance when 67 markers are compared. The shared common ancestor may have lived about 2,000 years ago or so. This DYS454 STR marker is not as reliable as a SNP mutation for categorizing men, but the 12 value plus other uncommon features and the close genetic distance make is certain this a distinct subgroup. A few persons who belong to this cluster may have had more recent ancestors who mutated to a value other than 12, but such samples have not surfaced.

Many men in this cluster have developed one or two other mutations at STR markers which make the cluster even easier to identify. The largest number of cluster men have a mutation at DYS459a from the ancestral 9 to 8. And many have a mutation from the ancestral 11 to 12 at DYS392. The DYS392=12 value is seen almost exclusively in G1 persons, with this G-M406 cluster being a major exception.

This cluster seems overwhelmingly made up of three identifiable ethnic groups (a) Ashkenazi Jews based on distinctive surnames together with ancestral origins in northeastern Europe south of Scandinavia, (b) Conversos with Hispanic surnames and (c) Men with Italian ancestral origins. However, an available sample from Iran also likely belongs to this cluster. The Ashkenazi Jews are so far not found in the group with the ancestral 11 at DYS392. And the Hispanics are so far not found within the DYS392=12 group. (See also page covering Jews with Haplogroup G (Y-DNA)). This cluster seems to be determined by the SNP FGC41427 or his subgroup S11415, according to Family Tree DNA haplotree (SNP S9591 has been chosen by Yfull for this branch)

==== Hadhrami cluster ====
Theres is another cluster of G-M406 > G-PF3296 men bearing the G-Y32612 Mutation. The G-Y32612 Mutation arose around 7200 YBP, but the TMRCA of all G-Y32612 bearer is estimated only 900 YBP. Members of this cluster are found in Yemen (Hadramut), Oman (Zufar), Indonesia, Malaysia and Saudi Arabia (Makkah), many members of this cluster are part of the Ba 'Alawi sada, This cluster has spread to Indonesia, G-PF3296 is a common haplogroup inside the Arab Indonesians community especially among descents of Sayyid Hadhrami.

=== G2a2b1d - CTS8450 ===
==== The DYS459b=10 cluster ====
The men in this cluster of G-M406 have (1) the unusual (for G-M406 men) value of 10 at STR marker DYS459b instead of the ancestral 9 value (2) and have a relatively close genetic distance when 67 markers are compared. This is so far a relatively small cluster with French and British ancestral histories. Too few samples are available to estimate with some reliability when the common male ancestor of this cluster may have lived.

== Migrations of G-M406 persons ==
It is logical that G-M406 spread westward along the Mediterranean from the area where it is most concentrated today (Turkey and the eastern Mediterranean countries) in conjunction with the trading, slave-selling and other migratory events originating in these lands. The first great trading empire that joined both ends of the Mediterranean was the Phoenician that originated in the Israel-Lebanon-Jordan area. After the demise of the Phoenicians, the Greeks, Romans, Byzantines and some "barbarians" could have spread G-M406 from the eastern Mediterranean to the west.

In comparisons of 67-marker G-M406 STR samples available from inland Europe with similar samples from (1) Turkey (2) Lebanon-Jordan and (3) Armenia certain deductions can be made. Most G-M406 Europeans have Armenians as their nearest relatives. Based on the number of mutations observed, some of these probably share common male ancestors as recently as the Dark Ages. Only one European branch showed Jordan/Lebanon samples as the nearest G relatives. Likewise none of the Europeans showed Turks alone as nearest relatives, but rather some European samples had Turks and Armenians equally related.

The sharing of common ancestors much farther back in time (perhaps 3,500 years ago) among some of these samples does not provide information so useful because the migration westward could have occurred anytime in the earlier period. The finding of likely G-M406 samples in the ancient isolated highlands of Sardinia, however, suggests the arrival of G-M406 in that island prior to the arrival of the Phoenicians. The latter began a Sardinian coastal presence about 3,000 years ago.

== See also ==
- genetic genealogy
- Y-DNA haplogroups by ethnic groups
- Haplogroup G (Y-DNA) Country by Country
