= Bernd Brinkmann =

German forensic pathologist

- Born: 7 April 1939 (age 87); Hamburg, Germany
- Education: University of Hamburg
- Occupation: Forensic pathologist
- Employer: University of Münster (1981-2007)

Bernd Brinkmann (born 7 April 1939) is a German forensic pathologist.

== Biography ==
Bernd Brinkmann was the director of the Institute of Legal Medicine of the University of Münster in Münster, North Rhine-Westphalia in Germany from 1981 until 2007. From 1990 until 2009 he served as the Coordinating Editor of the International Journal of Legal Medicine.

Brinkmann became a member of the German Academy of Sciences Leopoldina in 1991 and was president of the Deutsche Gesellschaft für Rechtsmedizin (DGRM) (1995–2001), the International Academy of Legal Medicine (1994–2000) and the International Society for Forensic Genetics (1990–1994).

He is director of the GEDNAP proficiency testing program for quality assurance in forensic DNA profiling and founded the Institute of Forensic Genetics in 2007 which performs forensic DNA analyses for various law enforcement agencies as well as paternity tests for German courts.

== Notable cases ==
In 1997, with Luigi Capasso and Annunziata Lopez, at the request of Otello Lupacchini GIP in Rome, Brinkmann researched the circumstances of the death of Roberto Calvi. Calvi, nicknamed "God's banker", was found hanged in London beneath Blackfriars Bridge in 1982 following the scandal concerning the collapse of Banco Ambrosiano and the involvement of the Vatican Bank. Calvi was said to have committed suicide but tests performed by Brinkmann proved that Calvi wouldn't have been able to hang himself this way and that he was thus actually murdered. Brinkmann's findings lead to a new investigation into Calvi's death and a murder trial in Italy in 2005.

In 2000, Brinkmann together with Jean-Jacques Cassiman used DNA testing to prove that the Lost Dauphin who died in captivity as a 10-year-old was indeed the son of Louis XVI and Marie Antoinette.

In 2004, Brinkmann - as an expert on Sudden Infant Death Syndrome - was called as an expert witness in a lengthy trial against a man accused of killing his own daughter and his testimony was crucial in proving that the death was of natural causes.

In 2010, Brinkmann was named as an expert witness in the trial of Jörg Kachelmann by the defense but was rejected by the court as biased.

In 2014, Boris Berezovsky's daughter Elizaveta requested a report from Brinkmann, with whom she had shared the autopsy photos, that noted the ligature mark on her father's neck was circular rather than V-shaped as is commonly the case with hanging victims, and called the coroner's attention to a statement by one of the responding paramedics who found it strange that Berezovsky's face was purple, rather than pale as hanging victims usually are. The body also had a fresh wound on the back of the head and a fractured rib (injuries police believed Berezovsky could have suffered in the process of falling as he hanged himself).
