= Peter M. Schneider =

German forensic geneticist

Peter Matthias Schneider
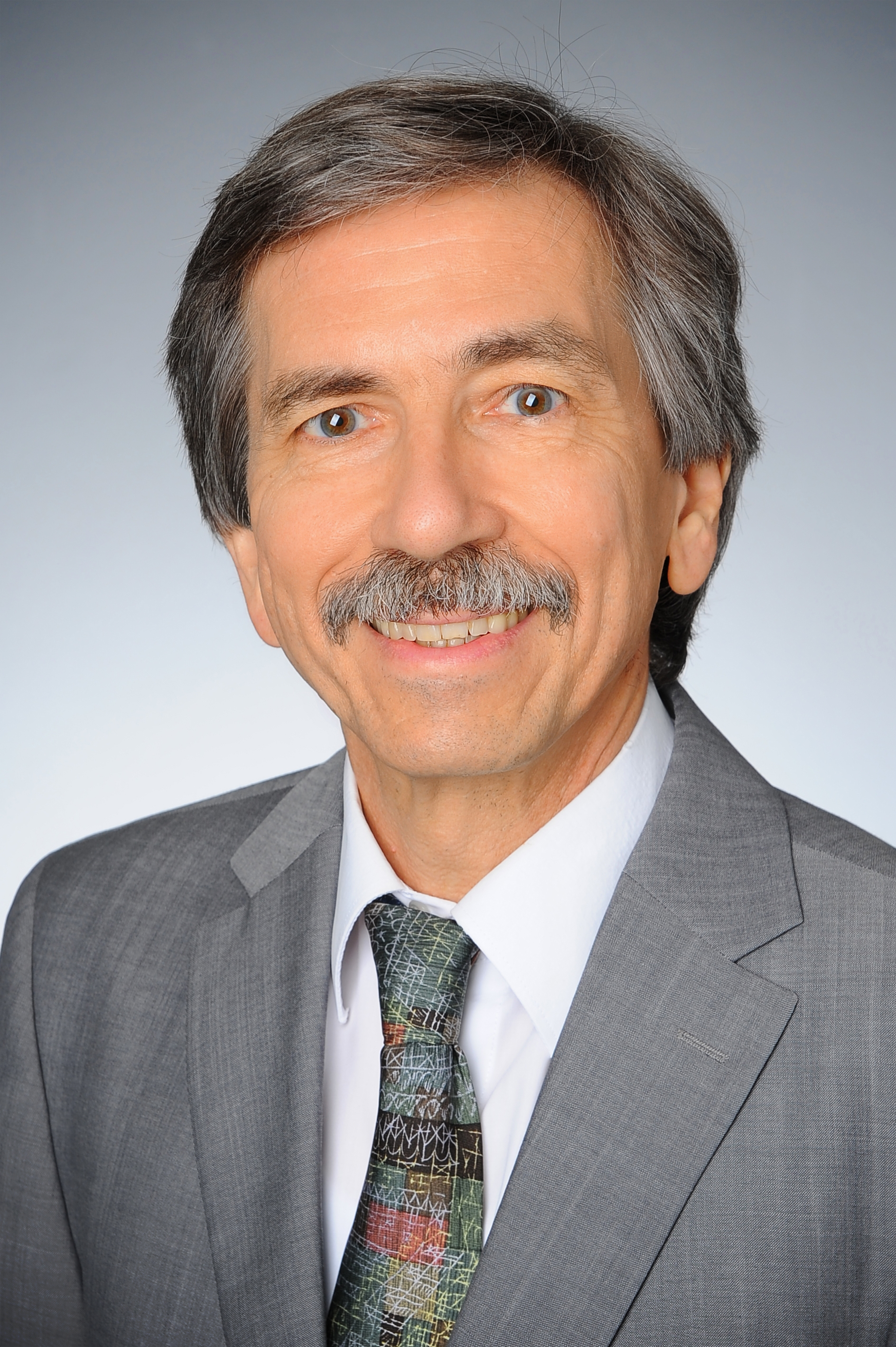
- Born: May 31, 1955; Berlin, Germany
- Died: September 9, 2022
- Education: University of Bonn; University of Mainz
- Known for: forensic genetics forensic biology
- Scientific career
- Fields: Molecular Genetics
- Workplaces: University of Bonn; Children's Hospital Boston; University of Mainz; University of Cologne

Peter Matthias Schneider (31 May 1955 – 9 September 2022) was a German forensic geneticist. He was a full professor at the Institute of Legal Medicine of the University of Cologne.

== Biography ==
Schneider studied biology at the University of Bonn until 1983. Between 1984 and 1986, he worked as visiting research fellow at the Children's Hospital Boston of Harvard Medical School on the genetic structure of the fourth component of the human complement system. He obtained his Ph.D. in 1987 at the University of Mainz and his habilitation in immunology in 1996, when he was promoted to assistant professor. In 2004, he became full professor and head of the Division of Forensic Molecular Genetics at the Institute of Legal Medicine of the University of Cologne.

== Research ==
Parallel to his work on the complement system and immunogenetics, Peter Schneider focussed his early scientific interest on the development of modern DNA profiling methods for DNA paternity testing and forensic DNA analysis of biological evidence in criminal casework. He held the role of coordinator in several international projects funded by European Union Framework Programmes for Research and Technological Development, such as the FP5 project High Throughput Analysis of Single Nucleotide Polymorphisms for the Identification of Persons - SNPforID (2002–2005), and the FP7 project European Forensic Genetics Network of Excellence - EUROFORGEN-NoE (2012–2016). In a collaboration with the UK-based charitable organisation Sense about Science, the consortium produced the guide Making Sense of Forensic Genetics explaining the state-of-the-art in DNA Profiling, National DNA databases and forensic DNA phenotyping.

He was work package leader in the VISible Attributes Through GEnomics -- VISAGE Consortium, a Horizon 2020 funded EU project developing new methods for DNA-based predictions of appearance, ancestry and chronological age of unknown contributors of biological stains in criminal casework, using massively parallel sequencing technology.

Peter Schneider actively participated in the scientific and public debate about introducing forensic DNA phenotyping into the German Code of Criminal Procedure, and using DNA methylation analysis to predict the age of young refugees in the context of the European migrant crisis. He published several peer-reviewed articles addressing the current state and future perspectives of DNA-based phenotype predictions in criminal casework.

In 2006, Schneider was awarded the prize of the German Konrad Händel Foundation for his outstanding scientific achievements and his merits in the field of the administration of justice.

== Board memberships and honorary appointments ==
- 1989: Founding member of the European DNA Profiling (EDNAP) Group
- 2000–2022: Executive board member of the International Society for Forensic Genetics (ISFG)
- 2000–2022: member of the German Stain Commission, a joint commission of Institutes of Legal Medicine and Forensic Science, and chairman of the commission since 2010
- 2004–2007: President of the ISFG
- 2007–2022: Associate editor of Forensic Science International: Genetics
- 2008–2011: Vice president of the ISFG
- 2009–2018: Member of the German Commission on Genetic Testing at the Robert Koch Institute
- 2014–2022: Secretary of the ISFG
- 2020–2022: Member of the Committee on Investigative Genetic Genealogy of the Scientific Working Group on DNA Analysis Methods (SWGDAM)
