= SallyAnn Harbison =

Forensic scientist at ESR in New Zealand

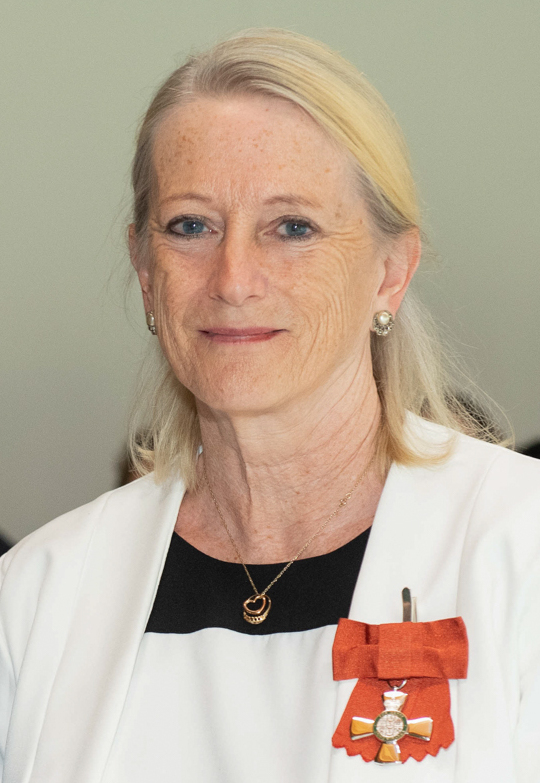
- Education: University of Liverpool, John Innes Centre
- Scientific career
- Workplaces: ESR; University of Auckland
- Thesis: Studies on carnation mottle virus (1985)
- Doctoral advisor: Professor Michael Wilson

SallyAnn Harbison MNZM FRSNZ is a New Zealand forensic scientist. She leads the forensic biology team at the Institute of Environmental Science and Research, and is an associate professor at the University of Auckland. Harbison was appointed a Member of the New Zealand Order of Merit in 2021 and in the same year was elected as a Fellow of the Royal Society Te Apārangi.

== Academic career ==
Harbison grew up in Oxford, but went to university in Liverpool, partly because of her favourite football team. In 1985 she completed a PhD titled Studies on carnation mottle virus at the University of Liverpool's Department of Biochemistry and the John Innes Centre, supervised by Professor Michael Wilson.

Harbison credits Wilson with giving her the confidence to take a postdoctoral position at the University of Auckland, where she worked on the genomics of white clover mosaic virus and genetic modification of clover to breed virus-resistant plants.

In 1988 Harbison moved to the chemistry division of the Department of Scientific and Industrial Research, where she moved into forensic biology. Her work involved crime scene examinations and evidence analysis, such as blood group identification and RNA and DNA profiling, and she worked on the first murder case to be solved using the DNA Profile Databank in 1999. Harbison oversees the DNA profile databank use for cold cases, which has seen convictions in the murder of Teresa Cormack and the 2001 murder of Marie Jamieson. She has supervised more than 60 Masters and PhD students.

== Awards ==
Harbison was awarded a New Zealand Science and Technology medal in 1996. In the New Years Honours of 2021 she was appointed a Member of the New Zealand Order of Merit (MNZM) for services to forensic science. Also in 2021 she was elected a Fellow of the Royal Society Te Apārangi. Her nomination said "SallyAnn Harbison has led the research and development of significant advances and innovation in forensic DNA and RNA analysis. [She] is recognised internationally for providing casework-ready, accredited science for the justice sector derived from her research activities."

== Selected works ==
- A Larkin; S Harbison (1 January 1999). "An improved method for STR analysis of bloodstained denim". International Journal of Legal Medicine. 112 (6): 388–390. doi:10.1007/s004140050020. ISSN 0937-9827. PMID 10550601. Wikidata Q73154376.
- Rachel I Fleming; SallyAnn Harbison (14 December 2009). "The development of a mRNA multiplex RT-PCR assay for the definitive identification of body fluids". Forensic Science International: Genetics. 4 (4): 244–256. doi:10.1016/j.fsigen.2009.10.006. ISSN 1872-4973. PMID 20457026. Wikidata Q46828495.
- Clare Brookes; Jo-Anne Bright; SallyAnn Harbison; John Buckleton (8 March 2011). "Characterising stutter in forensic STR multiplexes". Forensic Science International: Genetics. 6 (1): 58–63. doi:10.1016/j.fsigen.2011.02.001. ISSN 1872-4973. PMID 21388903. Wikidata Q58836704.
- Angela J Hough; Sally-Ann Harbison; Marion G Savill; Laurence D Melton; Graham Fletcher (1 August 2002). "Rapid enumeration of Listeria monocytogenes in artificially contaminated cabbage using real-time polymerase chain reaction". Journal of Food Protection. 65 (8): 1329–1332. doi:10.4315/0362-028x-65.8.1329. ISSN 0362-028X. PMID 12182489. Wikidata Q74618710.
- Rachel I Fleming; SallyAnn Harbison (19 January 2010). "The use of bacteria for the identification of vaginal secretions". Forensic Science International: Genetics. 4 (5): 311–315. doi:10.1016/j.fsigen.2009.11.008. ISSN 1872-4973. PMID 20457059. Wikidata Q43550962.
- Marsilea Adela Booth; Robert Vogel; James M. Curran; SallyAnn Harbison; Jadranka Travas-Sejdic (11 February 2013). "Detection of target-probe oligonucleotide hybridization using synthetic nanopore resistive pulse sensing". Biosensors and Bioelectronics. 45: 136–140. doi:10.1016/j.bios.2013.01.044. ISSN 0956-5663. PMID 23455053. Wikidata Q45143442.
