= Kırşehir Museum =

Museum in Turkey

- Kırşehir Müzesi
- Kırşehir Museum
- Established: 1997; 29 years ago
- Location: Ahi Evran caddesi 10 Kırşehir, Turkey
- Coordinates: 39°08′55″N 34°09′31″E
- Type: Archaeology, Ethnography
- Collections: Copper Age to Modern Age
- Collection size: 5112
- Owner: Ministry of Culture and Tourism

Kırşehir Museum is a museum in Kırşehir, Turkey. The museum is on Ahi Evran street in Kırşehir.

Since 1936, a local mosque was used to keep the ethnographical items. But the museum, itself, was not established until 1997. Kaman-Kalehöyük excavations was instrumental in establishing the museum. In 2010, also a separate Kaman-Kalehöyük Archaeological Museum was opened to exhibit the materials from that site. It is located near the mound of Kaman-Kalehöyük, about 45 km (28 mi) west of Kırşehir.

The Kirsehir Museum was rebuilt in 2008 with the economic and cultural cooperation of Turkish and Japanese governments. It was formally opened to public on 10 July 2010, and it preserves and displays the many artifacts from the archaeological excavations at Kaman-Kalehöyük.

The two storey 264 square metres (2,840 sq ft) museum building is a part of Kırşehir Culture complex which was previously used as an art gallery. There are two exhibition halls and one stock room.

The artifacts in the museum span from early Copper Age to present age. The archaeologic items and coins are exhibited in the ground floor. The ethnographic items are exhibited in the upper floor. Among the ethnographical items a special section is reserved for Ahi Evren of Kırşehir, a Muslim preacher who was known as the founder of Ahis fraternity in the 13th century.

In the museum, the artifacts from Kalehöyük, Yassıhöyük (Gordion) and Büklükale excavations are exhibited. These excavations were carried out by archeologists of the Japanese-Anatolian Archeology Institute. As a result, the museum collection has now reached around 5,000 items.

The world's oldest ironware was excavated at Kaman-Kalehöyük, and the evidence is presented at the museum. Also recently, what may be the oldest glass in the world has been found at Kaman. This glass is estimated to be 3600-year-old [1600 BC].

== See also ==
- Kaman-Kalehöyük Archaeological Museum
- Tomb of Ahi Evren
