= Paternity Index =

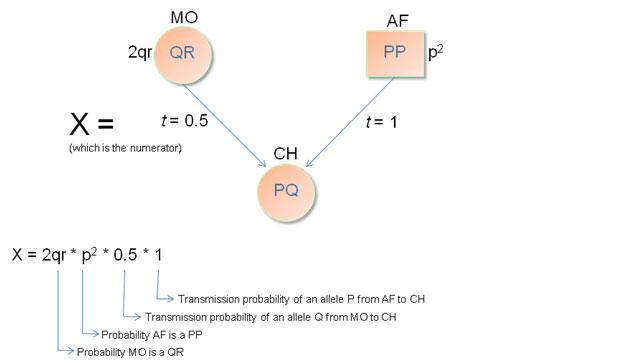
Example calculation of a paternity index

In paternity testing, Paternity Index (PI) is a calculated value generated for a single genetic marker or locus (chromosomal location or site of DNA sequence of interest) and is associated with the statistical strength or weight of that locus in favor of or against parentage given the phenotypes of the tested participants and the inheritance scenario. Phenotype typically refers to physical characteristics such as body plan, color, behavior, etc. in organisms. However, the term used in the area of DNA paternity testing refers to what is observed directly in the laboratory. Laboratories involved in parentage testing and other fields of human identity employ genetic testing panels that contain a battery of loci (plural for locus) each of which is selected due to extensive allelic variations within and between populations. These genetic variations are not assumed to bestow physical and/or behavioral attributes to the person carrying the allelic arrangement(s) and therefore are not subject to selective pressure and follow Hardy Weinberg inheritance patterns.

The product of the individual PIs is the CPI (Combined Paternity Index) which is ultimately used to calculate the Probability of Paternity seen on paternity test reports. If the CPI is greater than 1000, there is a match between the potential father and child (support in favour of paternity). A CPI value greater than 1000 means that the probability of paternity is over 99%. Minimum Probability of Paternity value requirements for state cases differ between states but the AABB requires in their Standards for Relationship Testing Laboratories (currently in the 9th edition) a minimum of 99.0% be reported where the tested man is ‘not excluded’ as the biological father of the child in question. U.S. Department of State requires a minimum Probability of Paternity of 99.5% for all immigration cases.

PI calculations utilize allele frequencies generated from established population databases most commonly using Short Tandem Repeats.

Because allele frequencies can be either generated in-house or published, PI's can differ between companies. This is an understood phenomenon and justifiable amongst members of the testing community.

== Calculations ==
The PI is a likelihood ratio that is generated by comparing two probabilities where PI = X / Y:

1. Numerator (“X”) – The probability that we observe the phenotypes of the tested participants in the inheritance scenario given that the tested man is the true biological father. More simply, the probability that some event will occur given a certain set of circumstances or conditions. This calculation assumes that the individuals tested are a “true trio/duo” (which is explained two paragraphs down) or in other words, the parent(s) tested are the true biological parents.
2. Denominator (“Y”) – The probability that we observe the phenotypes of the tested participants in the inheritance scenario given that a random man is the true biological father. More simply, the probability that some event will occur given a different set of circumstances or conditions. This calculation assumes that the individuals tested are a “false trio/duo” or in other words, the parent(s) tested are not the true biological parents.

In general, X / Y can be translated as: It is X / Y times more likely to see the observed phenotypes if the tested man is the true biological father than if an untested, unrelated randomly selected man from the same racial population was the true biological father.

There are 14 possible trio paternity combinations and 5 possible duo paternity combinations.

== See also ==
- Combined DNA Index System
- International Society for Forensic Genetics
