= Y Chromosome Haplotype Reference Database =

Open-access database for Y chromosome variations

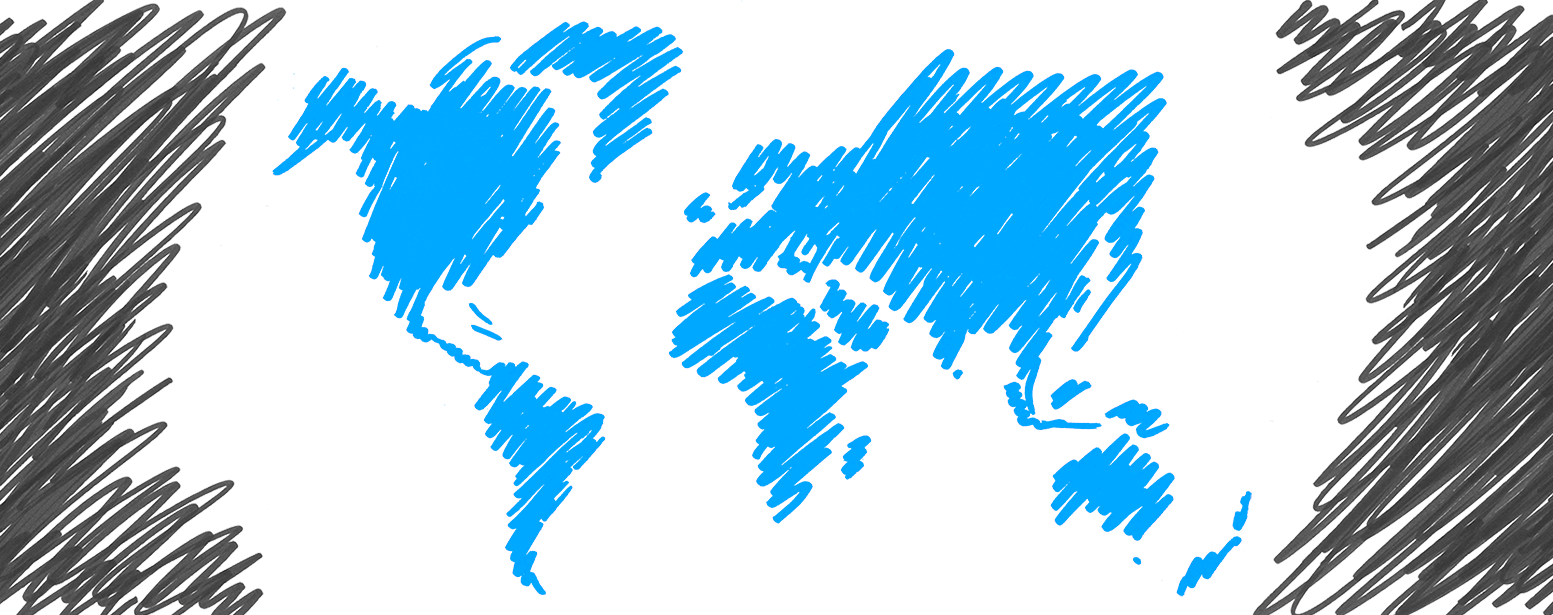
Logo of the Y Chromosome Haplotype Reference Database (YHRD) version 4.0

The Y Chromosome Haplotype Reference Database (YHRD) is an open-access, annotated collection of population samples typed for Y chromosomal sequence variants. Two important objectives are pursued: (1) the generation of reliable frequency estimates for Y-STR haplotypes and Y-SNP haplotypes to be used in the quantitative assessment of matches in forensic and kinship cases and (2) the characterization of male lineages to draw conclusions about the origins and history of human populations. The database is endorsed by the International Society for Forensic Genetics (ISFG). By May 2023 about 350,000 Y chromosomes typed for 9-29 STR loci have been directly submitted by worldwide forensic institutions and universities. In geographic terms, about 53% of the YHRD samples stem from Asia, 21% from Europe, 12% from North America, 10% from Latin America, 3% from Africa, 0.8% from Oceania/Australia and 0.2% from the Arctic. The 1.406 individual sampling projects are described in more than 800 peer-reviewed publications

== Submission and registration ==
YHRD is built by direct submissions of population data from individual laboratories. Upon receipt of a submission, the YHRD staff examines the originality, relevance, plausibility and validity of the data and assigns an accession number to the population sample if these criteria are met. The submissions are then registered to the public database, where the entries can be filtered for haplotypes, contributors or accession numbers. All population data published in forensic journals as FSI: Genetics or International Journal of Legal Medicine are required to be validated by the YHRD custodians and are subsequently included in the YHRD.

== Database structure ==
The database supports the most frequently used haplotype formats (e.g. Minimal (minHt), Powerplex Y12, YFiler, Powerplex Y23, YfilerPlus and Maximal (maxHt) for which differently-sized databases exist.

Because correlations exist between geographic areas, language groups and Y chromosomal variants, the YHRD population database was structured to display the geographic, linguistic and phylogenetic relationship of searched haplotype profiles. Currently the YHRD database recognizes four separate "metapopulation" structures: national, continental, linguistic/ethnic and phylogenetic affiliation with several categories within. In population genetics the term metapopulation describes discrete spatially distributed population groups which are interconnected by geneflow and migration. By analogy, the term metapopulation is used in forensic genetics to describe a set of geographically dispersed populations with shared ancestry and continuing geneflow. Thus, the population groups are more similar within the metapopulation than to groups outside the metapopulation.

=== National ===
The concept of pooling data to build "national databases" has a very straightforward explanation: law enforcement agencies and forensic services rely on their national population to build reference databases. In most instances offenders and victims stem from the national population, and their genetic profiles should thus be represented in the database. In countries like US, Brazil, UK or China which are characterized by strong population substructure national reference databases are often built on basis of a historical concept of ethnic affiliation, e.g. the US population is sub-structured in Caucasian, African, Hispanic, Asian and Native American populations or UK differentiates English, Afro-Caribbean, Indo-Pakistani and Chinese. National databases due to their importance in national legislation are thus searchable in the YHRD. Each national Metapopulation in the YHRD comprises all individuals sampled in a particular country regardless of the ancestry of the individuals.

=== Continental ===
Continental Metapopulations in the YHRD comprises all individuals sampled in a particular continent regardless of their ancestries. The YHRD defines seven continental Metapopulations following the United Nations classification of geographical regions: Africa, Arctic, Asia, Europe, Latin America, North America, Oceania/Australia.

=== Linguistic/ethnic ===
The Metapopulation structure built on basis of "ethnicity/linguistic affiliation" takes to a larger extent the ancestry of sampled individuals into account. "Ancestry" is a term collating historical, cultural, geographical and linguistic categories. Of course, a Metapopulation concept on basis of "ethnicity" is by no means ideal, fully rational or fully translatable, but simply takes the fact into account that on a global level categories other than "nation" or "geography" far better describe the observed genetic clustering and inhomogeneity of Y chromosome patterns.

For a global reference database the "major language group" criterion seems most appropriate to group data by taking the ancestry into account and produce subdatabases with respect to genetic similarity. The reasoning in doing so is twofold: first, language is an inherited cultural trait and thus the language phylae often correlate with genetic traits not the least to Y chromosome polymorphisms. Second, since languages are well examined by science and mostly understood by the public due to the long tradition of language research, the linguistic terminology is in principle more understandable and translatable into practice than their genetic pendant. Aside from the pure linguistic categorization (e.g. the Altaic language family comprising people speaking Turk and Mongol languages) we took also unifying geographic criteria (Sub-Saharan Africa comprising speakers of different African language groups which live south of the Sahara).

It is important to state, that the current Metapopulation structure is an a-priori categorization which needs a continuous evaluation and verification by means of statistical methods to quantify the genetic similarity/dissimilarity between the samples. While the current categorization of eight large Metapopulations gains some support from genetic distance analysis done on basis of ~41,000 haplotypes a further subdivision of the "Eurasian – European Metapopulation" was implemented solely on basis of Y-STR haplotypes. The analysis of ~12,000 European Haplotypes by AMOVA demonstrates that three larger pools of European haplotypes exist: the western, eastern and southeastern metapopulations.

Currently the YHRD has seven non-overlapping broadly defined metapopulations: African, Afro-Asiatic, Native American, Australian Aboriginal, East Asian, Eskimo-Aleut, and Eurasian. Some of these metapopulations are further subdivided, e.g. Eurasian into six subcategories, from which the European subgroup splits further into three groups of Western, Eastern and Southeastern Europeans.

=== Phylogenetic ===
The DNA profiling of Y chromosomes submitted to the YHRD is now continuously extended for binary Y-SNP polymorphisms. The phylogeny of the Y chromosome defined by binary polymorphisms is well established and stable. All Y chromosomes sharing a mutation are related by descent, until a further mutation splits the branch. Haplotypes within a haplogroup could be highly similar or even "identical by descent" (IBD). In thus, the haplogroup could be used as a criterion to substructure the database according to the phylogenetic descent of samples. Even though the chronology of the SNP mutations is far less certain than the structure of the tree, many haplogroups could be equated with events in human prehistory. The worldwide distribution of the patterns of the human Y-chromosome diversity has revealed clear geographically associated haplogroups.

== Database tools ==
=== AMOVA ===
Analysis of molecular variance (AMOVA) is a method for analyzing population variation using molecular data, e.g. Y-STR haplotypes. With AMOVA it is possible to evaluate and quantify the extent of differentiation between two or more population samples. AMOVA is implemented as an online tool in the YHRD and provides a way of estimating Φ_{ST} and F_{ST} values. The online tool accepts Excel files and creates entry files from it. As much as 9 reference populations selected from the YHRD as well as population sets can be added to the AMOVA analysis. The online calculation returns as a result a *.csv table with pairwise F_{ST} or Φ_{ST}(R_{ST}) values plus p-values as a test for significance (10,000 permutations). In addition, an MDS plot is generated to illustrate the genetic distance between the analyzed populations graphically. The program shows the references for the selected population studies which facilitates the correct citation.

=== Mixture ===
The tool can be applied for forensic cases when a mixed trace (2 or more male contributors) should be analyzed. The result will be a likelihood ratio of donorship vs. non-donorship of the putative contributor to the trace.

=== Kinship ===
The tool can be applied for kinship cases when a relationship between upstream and downstream relatives (e.g. father-son or grandfather-grandson) should be analyzed. The result will be a likelihood ratio (or kinship index) of patrilineal relationship vs. patrilineal non-relationship of the analyzed persons.

=== Match statistics ===
Searching the YHRD will result in a match or a non-match between a searched haplotype and the databased reference samples. The relative number of matches is described as the profile frequency. In forensic casework the probability of a match which is based on the profile frequency is evaluated using different methods. Some of these are recommended by national guidelines, e.g. the augmented counting method with confidence intervals and/or theta subpopulation correction (SWGDAM Interpretation Guidelines for Y-Chromosome STR typing by Forensic Laboratories in the US, 2014) or the Discrete Laplace method (Andersen et al. 2013) as recommended in Germany (Willuweit et al. 2018). Both augmented counting and DL values are provided by the YHRD for different metapopulations.

== See also ==
- DNA profiling
- List of online databases
- Population genetics
- Short tandem repeat
- Single-nucleotide polymorphism
- Y chromosome
