= Kaman-Kalehöyük Archaeological Museum =

Museum in Turkey

- Kaman-Kalehöyük Arkeoloji Müzesi
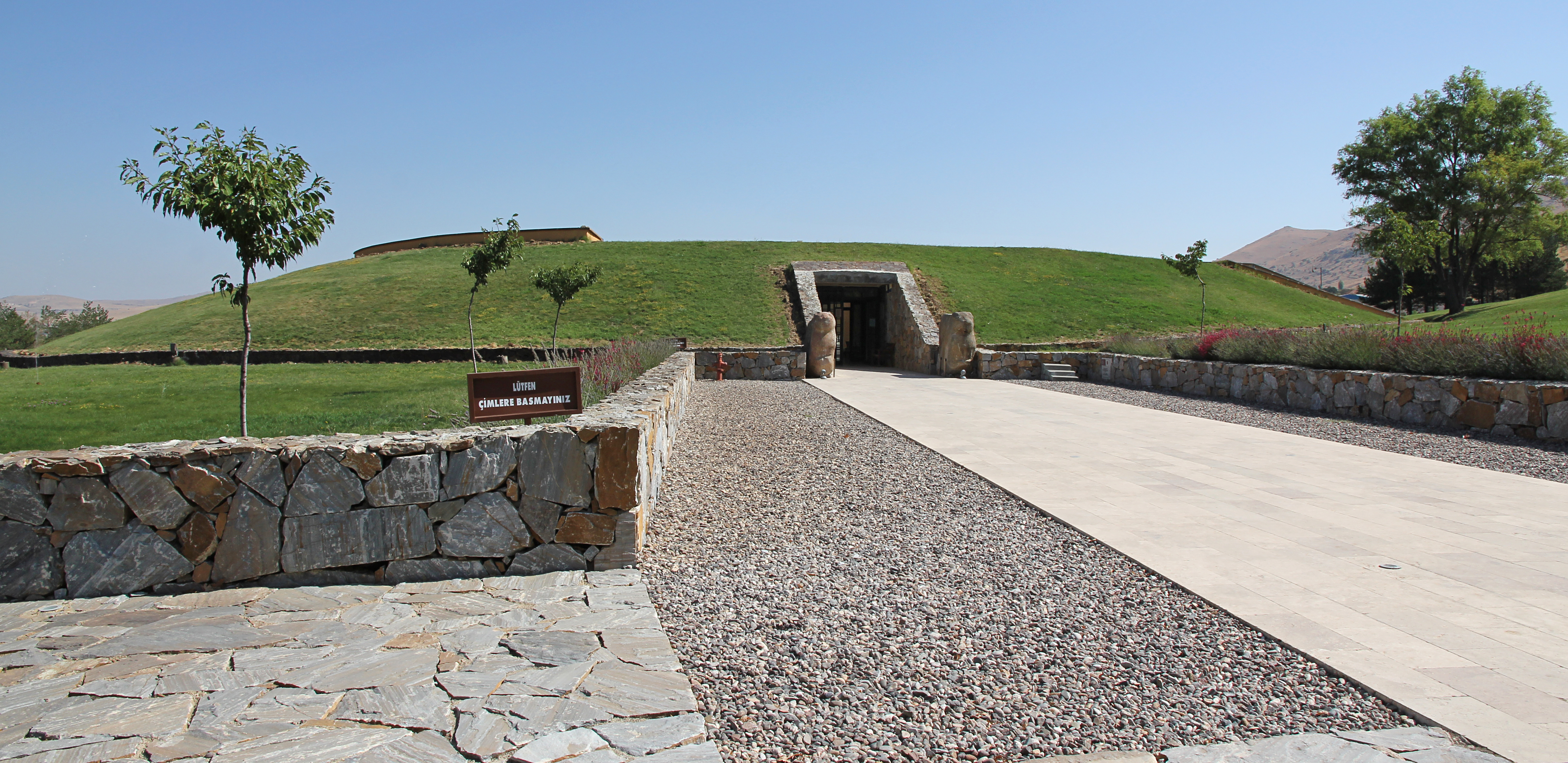
- Entrance to the museum.

- Location within Turkey
- Established: 10 July 2010; 16 years ago
- Location: Çağırkan, Kaman, Kırşehir, Turkey
- Coordinates: 39°20′45″N 33°47′29″E
- Type: Archaeology
- Collection size: approx. 5,000
- Owner: Ministry of Culture and Tourism
- Website: muze.gov.tr

The Kaman-Kalehöyük Archaeological Museum (Turkish: Kaman-Kalehöyük Arkeoloji Müzesi) is an archaeological museum located in the village of Çağırkan, about 3 km (1.9 mi) east of the town of Kaman, in Kırşehir Province, Turkey. It exhibits artifacts from seven civilizations excavated in the multi-period tell of Kaman-Kalehöyük, which is located about 2 km (1.2 mi) to the north of the museum. It opened in 2010. A Japanese garden is adjacent to the museum building.

About 45 km (28 mi) east of the Kaman-Kalehöyük Archaeological Museum, in the town of Kırşehir, there is also a separate Kırşehir Museum, which exhibits similar archaeological material from several ancient sites in this area, such as Yassıhöyük (Gordion) and Büklükale, as well as from Kaman-Kalehöyük.

== Background ==
In 2005, the Turkish and Japanese governments agreed to establish a museum and this was ratified in 2006 by the Turkish parliament. Construction started in 2008, to preserve and exhibit artifacts found by excavations in the Kaman-Kalehöyük tell, which has a diameter of 280 m (920 ft) and is 16 m (52 ft) high. The excavations were carried out under the direction of Sachihiro Omura on behalf of the Japan Middle East Cultural Center and the Japanese Institute of Anatolian Archaeology. The museum was opened to visitors in 2010. The museum resembles a tell, taking the Kalehöyük mound as a model, and is covered with grass.

In 2010, the museum received a Good Green Design Award from the Chicago Athenaeum. In 2012, it was nominated for the "European Museum of the Year Award".

There were about 80,000 local and foreign tourists in 2017, 87,000 in 2018 and approximately 100,000 in 2019, many of whom are Japanese.

In September 2025, Princess Akiko of Mikasa visited the museum and the Japanese garden, recalling her grandfather's and father's contributions.

== Museum ==
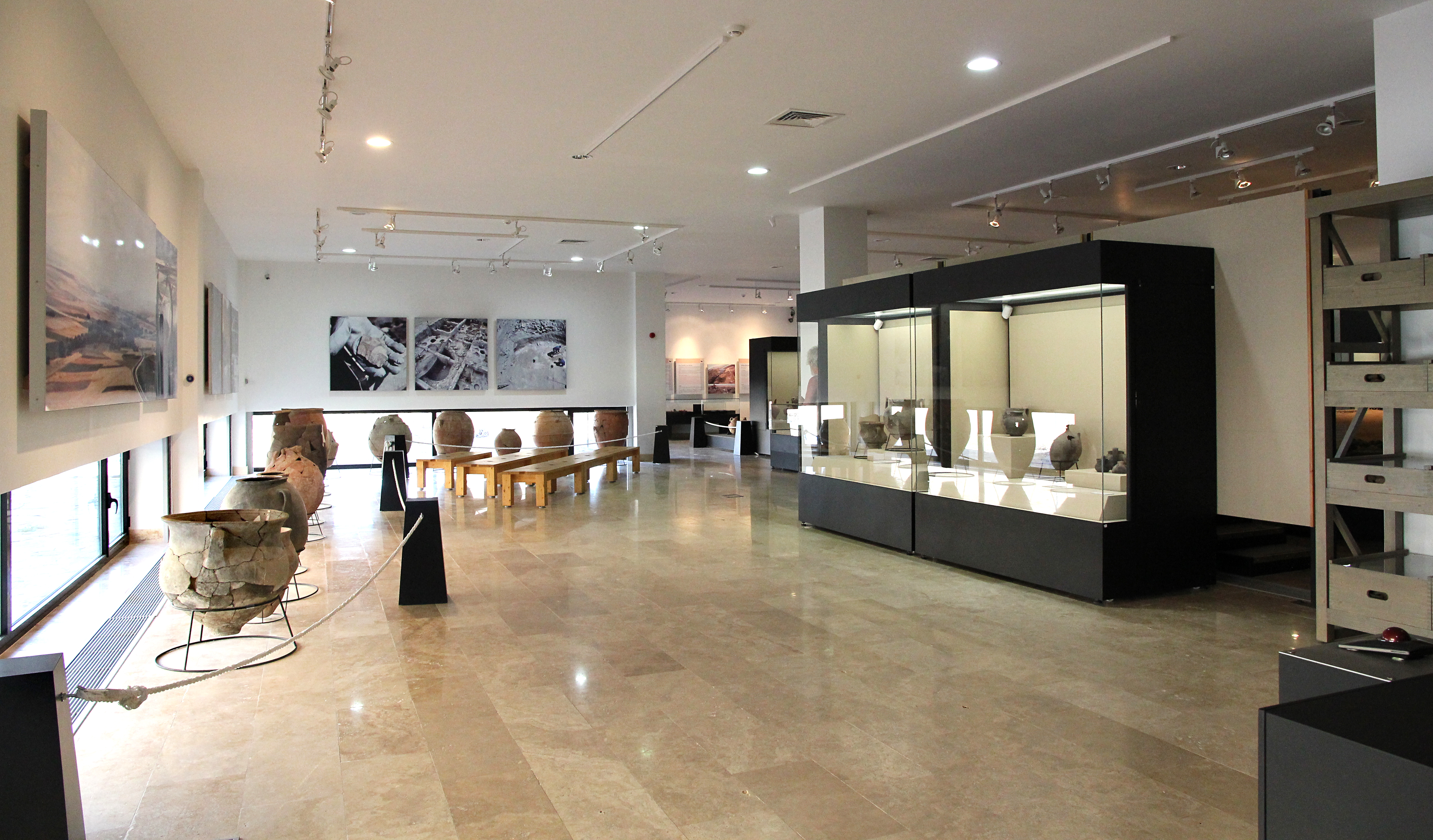
A view from the inside of the museum.

The museum covers 1,500 m^{2} (16,000 sq ft), including 470 m^{2} (5,100 sq ft) of covered area and 830 m^{2} (8,900 sq ft) of open area. It has exhibition halls, a cinema corner, a library, a laboratory for examination, research, photography and restoration work, a cafe, warehouses and technical departments.

It houses about 5,000 artifacts, including purchases and donations, as well as works from the Kalehöyük, Yassıhöyük and Büklükale excavations of the archaeologists of the Japanese Institute of Anatolian Archeology.

The artifacts unearthed belong to seven civilizations from the Chalcolithic to the Ottoman period, including the Assyrian, Hittite, Phrygian, Roman, Byzantine, Seljuk, and Ottoman civilizations. Many finds, such as hunting equipment, seals, coins, ceramic pieces, porcelain pieces from China, various structures, pottery and human skeletons are presented to visitors. There are many ceramic pieces, historical finds used by Assyrian trading colonies, seals from the Iron Age, coins from the Ottoman period, and porcelain pieces from the Qin dynasty (3rd century BC) brought from China, 17th century items with Chinese writings on the back. Most interesting are the bronze weapons of the Assyrians, dating back to approximately 3,800 years ago. More than 70 human skeletons belonging to Assyrians were found in a layer of fire.

Archeologists plan to continue excavations to recover evidence of the Neolithic Age, five or six thousand years BC, probably 5–6 m (16–20 ft) deeper; this could take 50 more years.

In addition to archaeological artifacts, the museum includes models of archaeological sites, virtual tour screens, three-dimensional artifact presentation screens, an exhibition hall supported by technological elements, such as holographic animated museum narration systems and interactive vision devices, with which computer images can be interacted without using any pointing device, activities for students and education, and social responsibility projects compatible with the surrounding community.

== Educational activities ==
The museum runs educational activities, especially for primary and secondary school students, in particular an "Archeo-School-Summer School" every summer. Activities include ceramic making on the potter's wheel, cuneiform writing, clay-mud figurine. Other groups can also benefit from the Summer School.

== Japanese Garden ==
The "Prince Mikasa Memorial" Japanese garden is adjacent to the museum. It was inaugurated by Prince Mikasa in 1993. It covers an area of 21,620 m^{2} (232,700 sq ft) , including 2,380 m^{2} (25,600 sq ft) of 17 high tree species, including Japanese cherry, Japanese weeping willow, Japanese apple, Japanese plum and Japanese quince in addition to native trees, 14,100 m^{2} (152,000 sq ft) of dwarf trees, 15,560 m^{2} (167,500 sq ft) of grassed area as well as an artificial waterfall and two ponds of size 3,500 m^{2} (38,000 sq ft) containing colorful carp from Japan. The garden is decorated with Japanese lanterns, a Buddha Temple, artificial mounds, natural stones, brushwood and special processed stones from Japan.

== See also ==
- Kırşehir Museum
