= Gednap =

GEDNAP is the acronym for German DNA Profiling and was used in the early nineties in analogy to EDNAP (European DNA Profiling, a working group of the International Society for Forensic Genetics (ISFG) for the first time in the course of the proficiency tests organized by the German Stain Commission, a Joint Commission of University Institutes of Legal Medicine and Police Institutes of Forensic Sciences in Germany.

After the introduction of DNA markers Prof. Bernd Brinkmann, at that time the director of the Institute of Legal Medicine in Münster (Germany) was appointed by the Stain Commission as Director of the GEDNAP proficiency testing scheme. After his retirement in 2007 Bernd Brinkmann founded the Institute of Forensic Genetics, serving as managing director of the GEDNAP Proficiency test program. Since 2023 the GEDNAP proficiency tests are organized by the Institute of forensic molecular genetics, based in Emsdetten.

From 2010 until his death in 2022, Prof. Peter M. Schneider served as chairman of the Stain Commission. The Stain Commission has published guidance documents on topics relevant in the field of forensic genetics for the German-speaking countries, such as "Recommendations on the interpretation of mixed stains" addressing the application of biostatistical methods for calculating the strength of the evidence of mixed DNA profiles.

The aim of GEDNAP is to offer forensic laboratories the opportunity to participate regularly in certified proficiency tests. The certificate documents that a certain number of biological samples of human origin has successfully been typed with a certain number of DNA markers routinely applied in forensic DNA profiling. Two GEDNAP proficiency tests are offered each year. The participants receive three reference samples and four casework-like stains. These include human body fluid samples, such as blood, semen and saliva, as well as mixtures of such samples. The results of the GEDNAP proficiency testing exercises are presented at the annually held German Stain Workshops.
