= John M. Butler (scientist) =

American scientist (born 1969)

- Born: April 1, 1969 (age 57); California, US
- Education: Brigham Young University; University of Virginia
- Known for: forensic genetics forensic biology
- Scientific career
- Fields: Forensic science
- Workplaces: National Institute of Standards and Technology
- Thesis: Sizing and quantitation of polymerase chain reaction products by capillary electrophoresis for use in DNA typing (1995)

John M. Butler (born April 1, 1969) is a scientist and expert on forensic DNA profiling. He is a fellow at the National Institute of Standards and Technology. Since 2020, he serves as president of the International Society for Forensic Genetics.

== Education ==
Butler received his bachelor's degree in Chemistry from Brigham Young University. From 1993-1995, he worked as a visiting scientist at the Federal Bureau of Investigation and earned his Ph.D. in Analytical chemistry from the University of Virginia in 1995. After a first employment as postdoctoral fellow at the National Institute of Standards and Technology for two years, he continued to work 1997-1999 as a staff scientist for the start-up company GeneTrace Systems Inc. using time-of-flight mass spectrometry for the separation of short tandem repeat markers.

== Professional career ==
Since 2000, Butler works at the NIST, first as project leader and since 2008 as group leader of the Applied Genetics Group. In 2013 he was promoted to Special Assistant to the Director for Forensic Science, NIST Office of Special Programs.

He co-chaired the National Commission of Forensic Sciences (NCFS) invoked by the Attorney General in 2013, to enhance the practice and improve the reliability of forensic science. The NCFS was terminated on April 23, 2017, following the presidential administration change and has published a business document both reflecting on the work done and the future work ahead.

Butler has written several widely recognized textbooks on forensic DNA profiling covering all aspects of the underlying molecular genetic methods, the application to forensic casework and the biostatistical interpretation of results. He received the Scientific Prize of the International Society for Forensic Genetics in 2003.

== Board memberships and committees ==
- Since 2000: Scientific Working Group on DNA Analysis Methods (SWGDAM)
- 2010-2018: Associate editor of Forensic Science International: Genetics
- Editorial Board member of Journal of Forensic Sciences
- Since 2016: Executive board member of the International Society for Forensic Genetics (ISFG)
