= Mark Benecke =

German forensic biologist

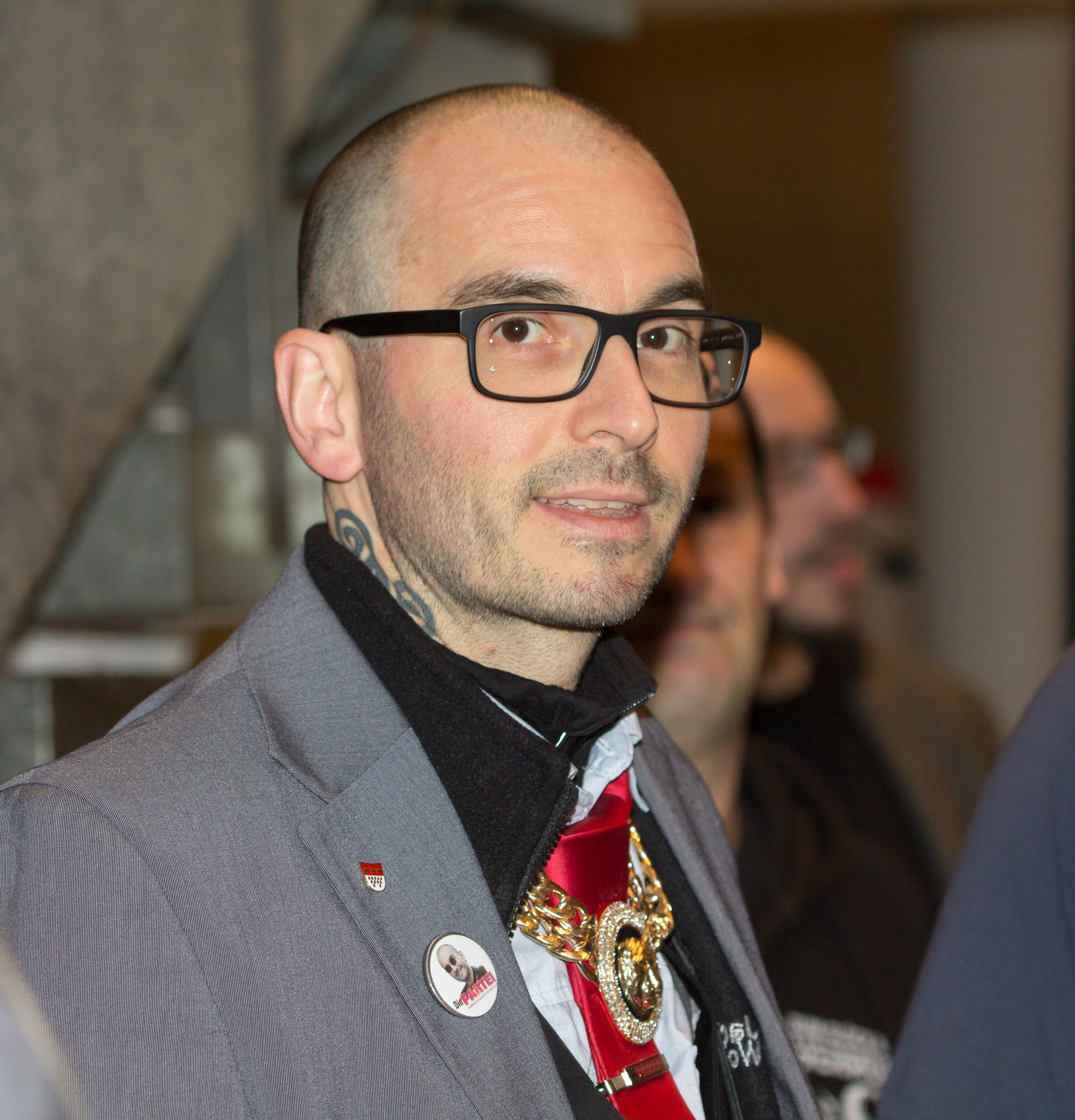
- Benecke in 2015
- Born: 26 August 1970 (age 56); Rosenheim, Bavaria, West Germany
- Education: Cologne University
- Known for: Work on identification of Adolf and Eva Hitler's skull and teeth in Moscow; only forensic scientist to work on the case of Colombian serial killer and rapist Luis Garavito
- Scientific career
- Fields: Forensic biology
- Workplaces: Freelance expert witness

Mark Benecke (born 26 August 1970) is a German forensic biologist.

== Career ==
=== Science ===
Benecke has worked on the identification of Adolf Hitler and Eva Braun's dental remains in Moscow (as well as a skull fragment claimed to be Hitler's). (Note: In 2009, DNA and forensic tests indicated that the skull belonged to a woman less than 40 years old.) He argued, in line with early investigator Hugh Trevor-Roper and scientific sources (including Hitler forensics expert Philippe Charlier), that body water would hinder an open-air cremation, as opposed to American jurist Michael Musmanno (in 1950) and historians such as Anton Joachimsthaler (1995), who argued that a full cremation explains why nothing more than Hitler and Braun's dental remains were found. (Note: Corpses identified by the Soviets as Hitler and Braun's are widely disregarded and considered by historian Mark Felton to evidence German fraud.) The dental remains include part of the jawbone, intact (with superficial burning) but sundered at the depth of the teeth. According to Benecke, these either prove "that Hitler died in 1945 – or lived the rest of his life in Argentina without [part of his jaw]".

Benecke is the only forensic scientist to work on the case of Colombian serial killer and rapist Luis Garavito. Some of Benecke's forensic cases have been covered by the National Geographic Channel and the History Channel.

Benecke has published several best-selling popular science books about the biology of aging, criminal cases and forensic biology. He is a member of the editorial board of the Annals of Improbable Research (Cambridge, US), guest editor for Forensic Science International (Forensic Entomology Special Issue) and scientific advisor to the German skeptic organization GWUP, where he publishes skeptical articles on various topics, including his attempt to explain alleged signs of vampirism. In 2001, Benecke was editor of the Forensic Science International special issue on forensic entomology. In 2004, he was the guest editor of Anil Aggrawal's Internet Journal of Forensic Medicine and Toxicology for the Forensic Entomology Special Issue).

=== Other ventures ===
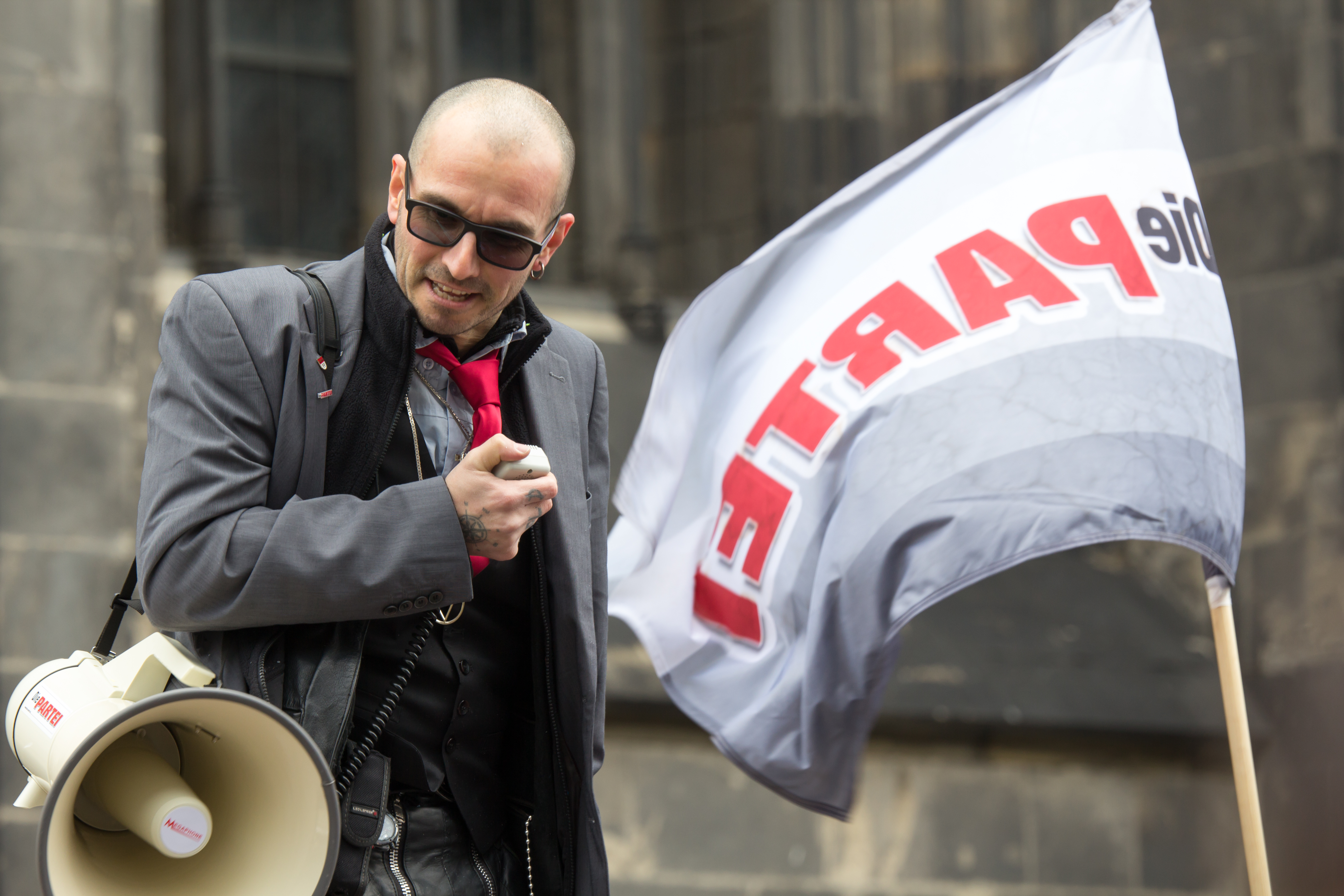
Benecke at a Die PARTEI event in 2015

In 2011, Benecke featured as a vocalist on Sara Noxx's cover of Nick Cave and the Bad Seeds' song "Where the Wild Roses Grow". In 2020, together with Bianca Stücker, he published a Leonard Cohen tribute cover album.

Using the pseudonym "Belcanto Bene", Benecke was a member of the German punk band Die Blonden Burschen between 1989 and 2000.

In 2010, Benecke was candidate for the office of prime minister for Germany's largest state, North Rhine-Westphalia, for the satirical political party Die PARTEI. Since 2010, he is chairman of Die PARTEI in the state of North Rhine-Westphalia.

== Personal life ==
Benecke was born in Rosenheim, Bavaria. After receiving a Dr. rer. medic. at Cologne University in 1997, he worked in the Chief Medical Examiner's Office in Manhattan, New York, from 1997 to 1999. As of 1999, he works internationally on forensic cases as a freelance expert witness. He also teaches at various police academies and acts as a visiting professor to universities in Germany, England, Vietnam, Colombia, and the Philippines. He was married to the criminal psychologist Lydia Benecke.

== Books ==
- Der Traum vom ewigen Leben, Droemer Knaur Kindler Verlag, München 1998. ISBN 3-463-40338-2 (German)
  - The Dream of Eternal Life, Columbia University Press, New York 2002. ISBN 0-231-11672-1
- 노화와 생명의 수수께끼 마크 베네케 (Dr. Mark Benecke) 과학은 죽음보다 강하다? (Korean). ISBN 89-7919-493-5
- Kriminalbiologie. Genetische Fingerabdrücke und Insekten auf Leichen, Lübbe, Bergisch-Gladbach 2001. ISBN 3-404-93025-8 (German)
- Mordmethoden. Ermittlungen der bekanntesten Kriminalbiologen der Welt, Lübbe, Bergisch-Gladbach 2002. ISBN 3-7857-2099-8 (German)
  - Mordmethoden, Lübbe, Bergisch-Gladbach 2004. ISBN 3-404-60545-4 (German)
  - Moordmethoden, Bruna Uitgevers, A.W., Boek 2004. ISBN 90-229-9155-5 (Dutch)
  - Murderous Methods, preface by Michael Baden. Columbia University Press, New York 2005. ISBN 0-231-13118-6 (English)
  - 살인 본능 / 법의곤충학자가 들려주는 살인자 추적기, translated by Kim Hee-sang, 알마 (Alma, year unknown). ISBN 978-89-92525-60-2 (Korean)
- Šiurpių nusikaltimų pėdsakais. ISBN 9955-08-547-9 (Lithuanian)
- Lachende Wissenschaft. Aus den Geheimarchiven des Spaß-Nobelpreises, Lübbe, Bergisch-Gladbach 2005. ISBN 3-404-60556-X (German)
  - "ПРИКОЛЬНАЯ НАУКА 1.ИЗ ТАЙНЫХ АРХИВОВ ШНОБЕЛЕВСКОЙ ПРЕМИИ", Moscow, книжный клуб 36.6, 2011, ISBN 978-5-98697-232-9 (Russian)
  - "ПРИКОЛЬНАЯ НАУКА 2.ИЗ ТАЙНЫХ АРХИВОВ ШНОБЕЛЕВСКОЙ ПРЕМИИ", Moscow, книжный клуб 36.6, 2011. ISBN 978-5-98697-233-6 (Russian)
- 怎麽有人研究這個? 法醫昆蟲學家的搞笑諾貝爾報告 / 怎么有人研究这个? 法医昆虫学家的搞笑诺贝尔报告. Taiwan: 馬克∙班内可, VR: 马克∙班内可 (Chinese)
- Dem Täter auf der Spur. So arbeitet die moderne Kriminalbiologie, Lübbe, Bergisch-Gladbach 2006. ISBN 3-404-60562-4 (German)
  - 모든 범죄는 흔적을 남긴다 / 법의곤충학자가 들려주는 과학수사 이야기 ISBN 978-89-92525-33-6 (Korean)
- Memento Mori, Edition Roter Drache, Rudolstadt 2012. ISBN 978-3-939459-39-2
- Mordspuren. Neue spektakuläre Kriminalfälle – erzählt vom bekanntesten Kriminalbiologen der Welt, Lübbe, Bergisch Gladbach 2007 ISBN 978-3-7857-2307-4 (German)
  - 연쇄 살인범의 고백 / 법의학자가 들려주는 살인 조서 이야기, 마르크 베네케 지음 | 송소민 번역 | 알마. ISBN 978-89-92525-43-5 (Korean)
- Medical Detectives (preface), vgs Verlagsgesellschaft, Köln 2005. ISBN 3-8025-3446-8 (German)
- Vampires among us, Sequenz Medien Produktion, Fuchstal-Welden 2006. ISBN 3-935977-75-1
  - Vampire unter uns! (mit E. Wawrzyniak, N. Palanetskaya & K. Sonntag), Edition Roter Drache, Rudolstadt, 2009. ISBN 978-3-939459-24-8
  - Vampyres among us!: Volume III – A scientific study into vampyre identity groups and subcultures (with Ines Fischer), Edition Roter Drache, Rudolstadt, 2015. ISBN 978-3-9394-5995-8
- Wo bleibt die Maus?, Sauerländer, Oberentfelden 2008. ISBN 3-7941-5174-7 (German)
  - Wo bleibt die Maus? Buchvolk-Verlag, Zwickau 2016. ISBN 978-3-944581-12-5
  - Hvor blev musen af? En historie om livets kredsløb, Klematis Forlag. ISBN 87-641-0304-8 (Danish, Oversætter: Mette Jørgensen, Illustrationer: Lisa Fuss)
- Ölümün İzleri, Kırmızı Kedi. ISBN 978-9944-75-619-8 (Turkish)
- Cinayet Yöntemleri, Kırmızı Kedi. ISBN 978-6055-34-045-2 (Turkish)
- Warum man Spaghetti nicht durch zwei teilen kann, Luebbe, Bergisch Gladbach 2009. ISBN 3-7857-2368-7
- Das knallt dem Frosch die Locken weg: Experimente für kleine und große Forscher, Oetinger, Hamburg 2012. ISBN 978-3-78918-437-6
- Mein Leben nach dem Tod: Wie alles anfing (Biography), Luebbe, Bergisch-Gladbach 2019. ISBN 978-3-431-04133-0
- Viren für Anfänger (Corona Virus), Luebbe, Bergisch-Gladbach 2020. ISBN 978-3-404-61716-6
- Kat Menschiks und des Diplom-Biologen Doctor Rerum Medicinalium Mark Beneckes Illustrirtes Thierleben (Animals / Natural History), Galiani, Berlin 2021. ISBN 978-3-86971-201-7
