= Anil Aggrawal's Internet Journal of Forensic Medicine and Toxicology =

- Discipline: Forensic medicine, pathology, toxicology
- Language: English

Publication details
- History: 2000–present
- Publisher: Anil Aggrawal (India)
- Frequency: Biannually
- Open access: Yes

Standard abbreviations
- ISO 4: Anil Aggrawal's Internet J. Forensic Med. Toxicol.

Indexing
- ISSN: 0972-8066 (print); 0972-8074 (web)
- OCLC no.: 473148291

Links
- Journal homepage

Anil Aggrawal's Internet Journal of Forensic Medicine and Toxicology is an online scientific journal covering forensic medicine and toxicology and allied subjects such as criminology, police science, and deviant behavior. It is one of the most widely read and popular peer-reviewed forensic medicine journals in the world. The journal is published semiannually and is indexed by EMBASE, Chemical Abstracts Service, Locatorplus, EBSCO, Indianjournals.com, Scopus and Emerging Sources Citation Index (ESCI) by Clarivate. It was established by Anil Aggrawal (Maulana Azad Medical College, New Delhi) in 2000.

== Thematic issues ==
The journal has produced several thematic issues on forensic entomology edited by Mark Benecke of Germany, on crime scene investigation edited by Daryl Clemens, and on toxicology edited by V.V.Pillay of India.

Index of special issues
S.no.	Vol, no, year	Special on	Guest editor
1	Volume 5, Number 1, January - June 2004	Forensic Entomology	Mark Benecke, Germany
2	Volume 5, Number 2, July - December 2004	Crime Scene Investigation	Daryl Clemens, USA
3	Volume 6, Number 1, January - June 2005	Toxicology	V.V.Pillay, India
4	Volume 24, Number 1, Jan-June 2023	Cyber and digital Forensics	Vinny Sharma, India
