= Anil Aggrawal =

Professor of forensic medicine (born 1956)

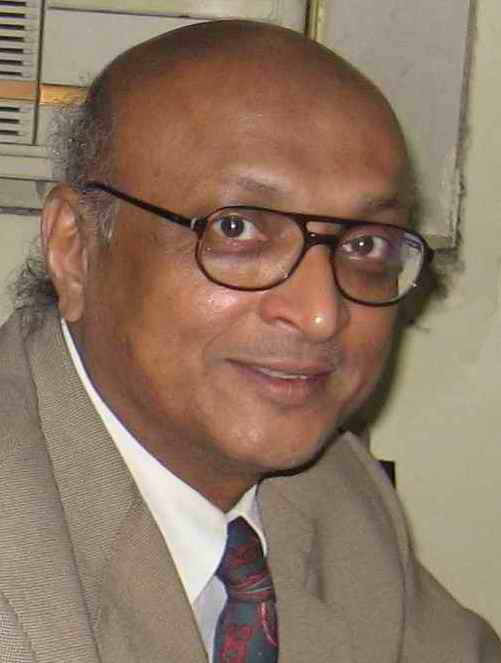
- Anil K. Aggrawal
- Education: University College of Medical Sciences; University of Delhi
- Title: Professor
- Scientific career
- Fields: Forensic Medicine, Toxicology, Study of Paraphilias
- Workplaces: Maulana Azad Medical College
- Academic advisors: Anthony Buttuil, University of Edinburgh
- Website: http://anilaggrawal.com/

Anil Aggrawal (Hindi: अनिल अग्रवाल, IAST: Anil Aggrawāl; born 17 August 1956) is a professor of forensic medicine at the Maulana Azad Medical College, New Delhi, India. He is known chiefly for his online journal, Anil Aggrawal's Internet Journal of Forensic Medicine and Toxicology. He joined Maulana Azad Medical College as a faculty member in 1985. Aggrawal proposed a new classification of necrophilia, and is considered the leading authority on necrophilia.

== Books ==
Professor Aggrawal has authored more than 20 books. Some of these namely, Forensic and Medico-legal Aspects of Sexual Crimes and Unusual Sexual Practices, Necrophilia-Forensic and Medicolegal aspects Age Estimation in the Living: The Practitioner's Guide,Textbook of Forensic Medicine and Toxicology, Injuries - Forensic and Medicolegal aspects, and Clinical and Forensic Toxicology [2-volumes] have been well received by academics across nations.
