= Kaman, Kırşehir =

Kaman
- Municipality
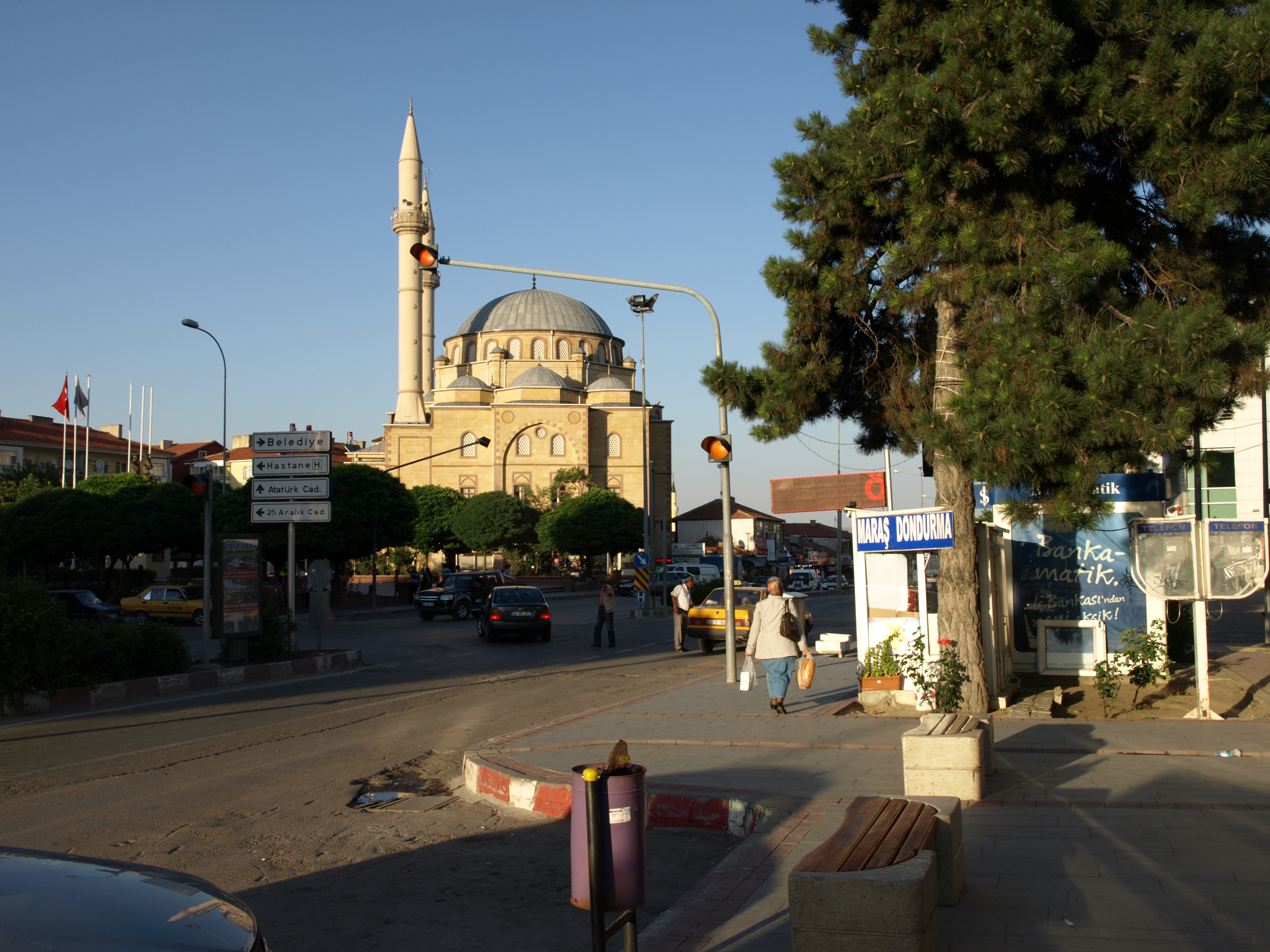
- The square in the center of Kaman

- Location within Turkey Location within Turkey Central Anatolia
- Coordinates: 39°21′27″N 33°43′26″E
- Country: Turkey
- Province: Kırşehir
- District: Kaman

Government
  - Mayor: Emre Demirci (AKP)
- Elevation: 1,100 m (3,600 ft)
- Population (2022): 21,340
- Time zone: UTC+3 (TRT)
- Area code: 0386
- Website: www.kaman.bel.tr

Kaman, formerly known as Chnamane (Khomane), and Zama, is a town in Kırşehir Province in the Central Anatolia region of Turkey. It is the seat of Kaman District. Its population is 21,340 (2022). Its elevation is 1,100 m (3,600 ft).

Kaman-Kalehöyük Archaeological Museum is located to the east of the town. It exhibits many artifacts from the significant ancient site of Kaman-Kalehöyük nearby, and from other ancient settlements in this general area.

== History ==
The district, which has a settlement history of approximately 5000 years since 3000 BC, got its name Kaman from the use of the name "CHNAMANE", which came to the region in the Roman and Byzantine ages, as Kaman by the Turks. In another rumor, it comes from the Hittites who lived around Kızılırmak between 1200 and 2200 BC.

According to another study, a Turkmen community named "Kaman", mentioned in the Ottoman 1520 cadastral registers, descended from the bey line of the Dulkadirs, settled in the current Gökeşme location. The Turkmen families named Cığıruşağı, Camışuşağı, Yahyabeyuşağı Taşkınlar and Dağlar, who had settled in Kaman before, invited this larger and more powerful community to this region rich in water resources. Kaman oba said this offer, "We will come, but we will name the place Kaman." he admitted. In the sources, after these centuries, the name Kaman begins to appear as a place. Families that are descendants of the above tribes in Kaman also confirm this theory. The surnames of the aforementioned families continue today as Cibiroğulları (Şahin), Camışuşağı (Yaman), Yahyabeyuşağı (Turgut), Kaman (Kamanlıoğlu) Community (Kaman, Maraş), Taşkın, Dağ.

The district has been under the rule of Hittites, Phrygians, Assyrians, Persians, Romans, Byzantines and Mengücekoğulları, Eretna, Karaman and Dulkadiroğulları Principalities for long years. Today, Kaman, which has 41 villages, 10 towns and an area of 1232 km2; The fact that the Oghuz tribes started to live in this region by choosing Konar-Nomadic or settled life as Turks and Islam in the 11th century is a symbol that they have continued this Turkmen essence since that day. Works are still continuing in Kaman Cagirkan Kalehöyük Excavation Site, which has been excavated by the Japanese since 1985 and has more than 5 thousand historical artifacts.

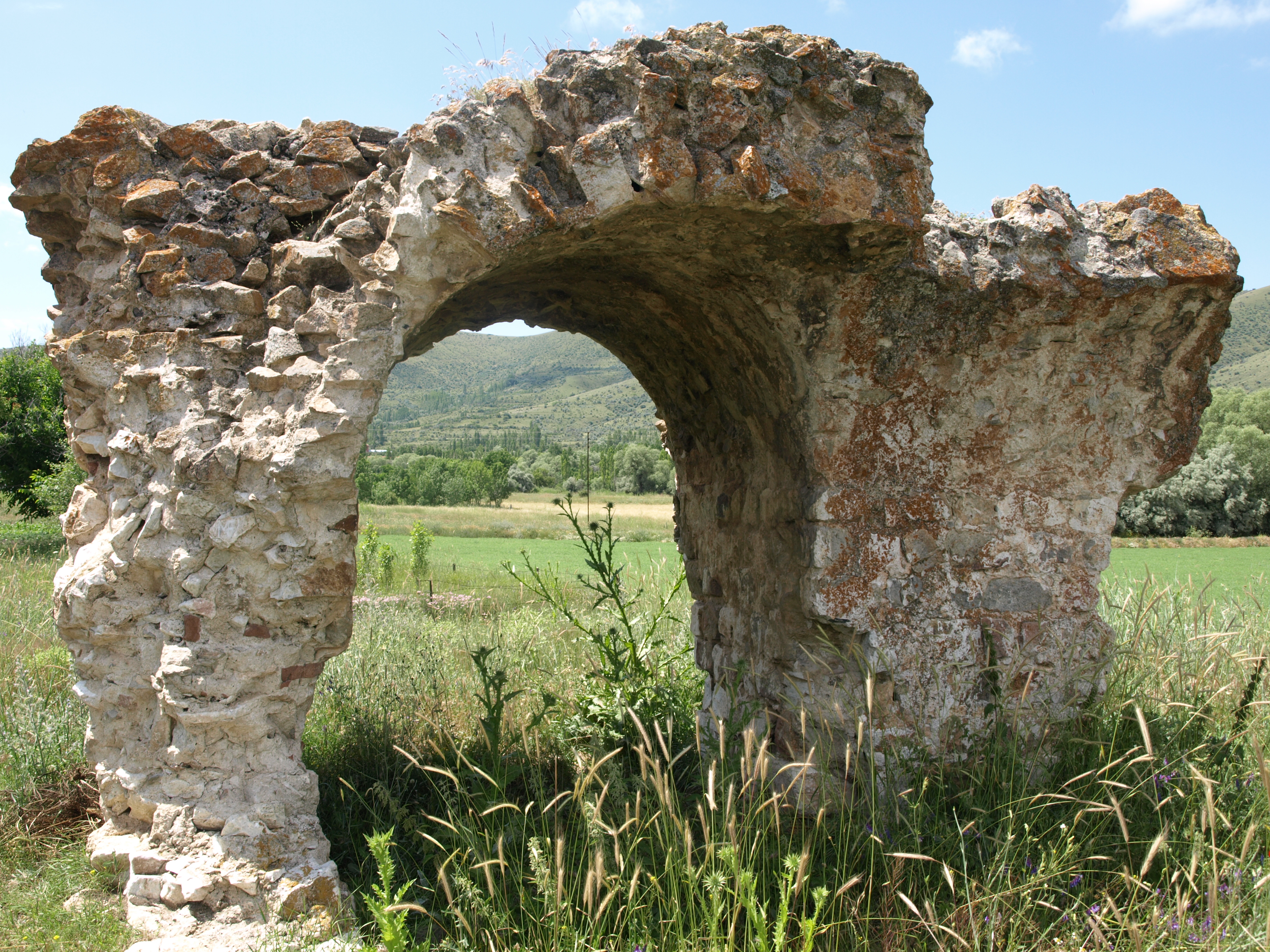
Church remains in Demirli.

Kaman, which was a municipality in 1924, was turned into a district on September 1, 1944. Due to the transformation of Kırşehir into a district, it became a district of Ankara for a short time. When Kırşehir became a province again, it was connected to Kırşehir again.

== Climate ==
Kaman has a dry-summer continental climate (Köppen: Dsa), with cold winters and dry, moderately hot summers.

Climate data for Kaman (1991–2020)
Month	Jan	Feb	Mar	Apr	May	Jun	Jul	Aug	Sep	Oct	Nov	Dec	Year
Mean daily maximum °C (°F)	2.8 (37.0)	5.1 (41.2)	10.3 (50.5)	15.6 (60.1)	20.7 (69.3)	25.3 (77.5)	29.1 (84.4)	29.3 (84.7)	25.0 (77.0)	18.8 (65.8)	11.1 (52.0)	4.9 (40.8)	16.6 (61.9)
Daily mean °C (°F)	−0.7 (30.7)	0.9 (33.6)	5.2 (41.4)	9.9 (49.8)	14.6 (58.3)	18.6 (65.5)	21.9 (71.4)	22.0 (71.6)	17.9 (64.2)	12.7 (54.9)	6.1 (43.0)	1.4 (34.5)	10.9 (51.6)
Mean daily minimum °C (°F)	−3.7 (25.3)	−2.7 (27.1)	0.8 (33.4)	4.9 (40.8)	9.0 (48.2)	12.1 (53.8)	14.6 (58.3)	14.8 (58.6)	11.4 (52.5)	7.6 (45.7)	2.1 (35.8)	−1.6 (29.1)	5.8 (42.4)
Average precipitation mm (inches)	60.89 (2.40)	40.78 (1.61)	53.29 (2.10)	49.46 (1.95)	46.78 (1.84)	30.26 (1.19)	8.22 (0.32)	13.48 (0.53)	15.46 (0.61)	31.39 (1.24)	47.83 (1.88)	57.48 (2.26)	455.32 (17.93)
Average precipitation days (≥ 1.0 mm)	7.5	6.3	8.0	7.5	7.4	5.3	2.4	1.9	3.3	4.9	5.2	7.5	67.2
Average relative humidity (%)	80.4	73.3	64.6	59.8	59.7	55.7	48.0	48.2	50.0	59.7	68.9	79.7	62.4
Source: NOAA
