= Forensic Science International =

- Discipline: Forensic science
- Language: English
- Edited by: C. Cattaneo & C. Jackowski

Publication details
- History: 1972–present
- Publisher: Elsevier
- Frequency: Monthly
- Impact factor: 2.2 (2023)

Standard abbreviations
- ISO 4: Forensic Sci. Int.

Indexing
- Forensic Science International
- ISSN: 0379-0738
- OCLC no.: 222758907
- Forensic Science International Supplement Series
- ISSN: 1875-1741
- OCLC no.: 746934323

Links
- Journal homepage; Online access

Forensic Science International is a peer-reviewed academic journal of forensic science. The journal was established in 1972 and is published by Elsevier. The journal occasionally published supplements from 1999 onwards, but these supplements were spun into their own journal Forensic Science International Supplement Series in 2009. Only one issue of the supplement series was published under its distinct title.

== Abstracting and indexing ==
Forensic Science International is abstracted and indexed in the following databases:

- Biological Abstracts
- Bulletin Signalétique
- Cambridge Scientific Abstracts
- Chemical Abstracts
- Criminology, Penology and Police Science Abstracts
- Current Awareness in Biological Sciences
- Current Contents
- EMBASE
- MEDLINE
- National Criminal Justice Reference Service
- Science Citation Index
- Scopus

== See also ==
- Forensic Science International: Genetics
