= Çamlıbel tarlası =

Archaeological site in Turkey

Çamlıbel Tarlası is a mid 4th millennium BCE Chalcolithic archaeological site, in northern central Anatolia, modern Turkey, The site of is located near the town of Boğazkale.

== Excavations ==
=== Site ===
The excavations of the site were conducted from 2007–2009 as a cooperative project between the German Archaeological Institute and Edinburgh University, in order to understand the prehistoric periods of the area preceding the rise of the Hittites; who founded their capital Hattusha 2.5 km east of Çamlıbel Tarlası.

There is evidence for both intensive metallurgy and permanent occupation. Anthracological analysis indicates that the primary fuel wood used was deciduous oak, which comprised nearly 90% of identifiable fragments. A large copper ore deposit has been discovered ca. 2 km upstream from the site.

=== Human activity and remains ===
Excavation has revealed four main phases of human activity interrupted by shorter periods of ephemeral use spanning an estimated time of 120 years.

The remains of 19 individuals were recovered from both pots burials and contexts without grave vessels, another possible nine individuals were recovered from secondary contexts.

Five juvenile individuals show signs of artificial cranial deformation. Similar deformations have been found on the juvenile remains from the Chalcolithic site of Değirmentepe.

The people of Çamlıbel Tarlası practiced age-differential burial as babies and very young children were buried in jars as possible secondary burials, underneath house doors, or placed adjacent to the house walls. This is a phenomenon seen across other parts of the Near East in the (Late) Chalcolithic and into the Early Bronze Age; for example infant jar burials beneath the houses of doors are seen during this period (ca. 5000–2500 BC) in the southern Levant and central and southeastern Anatolia. Older children and adults were inhumed in primary burials in the Hocker position.
