= International Journal of Legal Medicine =

- Discipline: Legal medicine
- Language: English
- Edited by: Heidi Pfeiffer, Andreas Schmeling

Publication details
- History: 1990–present
- Publisher: Springer Science+Business Media
- Frequency: Bimonthly
- Impact factor: 2.1 (2022)

Standard abbreviations
- ISO 4: Int. J. Leg. Med.
- NLM: Int J Legal Med

Indexing
- ISSN: 0937-9827 (print); 1437-1596 (web)
- LCCN: sn91033072
- OCLC no.: 444635582

Links
- Journal homepage; Online archive

The International Journal of Legal Medicine is a peer-reviewed scientific journal covering forensic science and legal medicine. It was established in 1990 and is the official journal of the International Academy of Legal Medicine. The journal is published by Springer Science+Business Media and the editors-in-chief are Heidi Pfeiffer and Andreas Schmeling. (both: University Hospital Münster)

== Abstracting and indexing ==
The journal is abstracted and indexed in:

- Biological Abstracts
- BIOSIS Previews
- Current Contents/Clinical Medicine
- EBSCO databases
- Embase
- HeinOnline
- Index Medicus/MEDLINE/PubMed
- Science Citation Index Expanded
- Scopus

According to the Journal Citation Reports, the journal has a 2022 impact factor of 2.1.
