= DNA paternity testing =

DNA matching techniques to identify someone's father

DNA paternity testing uses DNA profiles to determine whether an individual is the biological parent of another individual. Paternity testing can be essential when the rights and duties of the father are in issue, and a child's paternity is in doubt. Tests can also determine the likelihood of someone being a biological grandparent. Though genetic testing is the most reliable standard, older methods also exist, including ABO blood group typing, analysis of various other proteins and enzymes, or using human leukocyte antigen antigens. The current paternity testing techniques are polymerase chain reaction (PCR) and restriction fragment length polymorphism (RFLP). Paternity testing can now also be performed while the woman is still pregnant from a blood draw.

DNA testing is currently the most advanced and accurate technology to determine parentage. In a DNA paternity test, the result (called the 'probability of parentage) is 0% when the alleged parent is not biologically related to the child, and the probability of parentage is typically 99.99% when the alleged parent is biologically related to the child. However, while almost all individuals have a single and distinct set of genes, rare individuals, known as "chimeras", have at least two different sets of genes. This can lead to complications during DNA analysis, such as false negative results if their reproductive tissue has a different genetic makeup from the tissue sampled for the test.

== Paternity or maternity testing for child or adult ==
The DNA test is conducted by collecting buccal (cheek) cells found on the inside of a person's cheek using a buccal or cheek swab. These swabs have handles made of wood or plastic with a cotton synthetic tip. The collector rubs the inside of a person's cheek to collect as many buccal cells as possible, which are then sent to a laboratory for testing. Samples from both the alleged father or mother and the child are required for the test.

== Prenatal paternity testing for unborn child ==
=== Invasive prenatal paternity testing ===
It is possible to determine who the biological father of the fetus is while the woman is still pregnant through a procedure known as chorionic villus sampling or amniocentesis. Chorionic villus sampling retrieves placental tissue, which can be done either through the cervix (transcervical) or the abdominal wall (transabdominal). Amniocentesis involves collecting amniotic fluid by inserting a needle through the pregnant mother's abdominal wall. Both procedures are highly accurate because they obtain samples directly from the fetus. However, there is a small risk of miscarriage associated with them, which could result in the loss of the pregnancy. Both CVS and amniocentesis require the pregnant woman to consult a maternal-fetal medicine specialist who will perform the procedure. CVS testing can be taken from as early as 10 weeks into pregnancy and an amniocentesis test can be performed between 14 and 20 weeks of pregnancy.

=== Non-invasive prenatal paternity testing ===
Recent advances in genetic testing have led to the ability to identify the biological father while the woman is still pregnant. A small quantity of cell-free fetal DNA (cffDNA) is present in the mother's blood during pregnancy. This allows for accurate paternity testing during pregnancy from a blood draw without any risk of miscarriage. Research indicates that cffDNA can first be detected as early as seven weeks into the pregnancy, and its quantity increases as the pregnancy continues.

== DNA profiling ==
Example of DNA profiling in order to determine the father of a child (Ch). Child's DNA sample should contain a mixture of different size DNA bands of both parents. In this case, person #1 is likely the father.

The DNA of an individual is identical in all somatic (non reproductive) cells. During sexual reproduction, the DNA from both parents combines to create a unique genetic makeup in a new cell. As a result, an individual's genetic material is derived equally from each parent. This genetic material is referred to as the nuclear genome because it is located in the nucleus of a cell.

Autosomal DNA testing allows for a comparison between the child's DNA, the mother's DNA, and the alleged father's DNA. By examining the genetic contribution from the mother, researchers can determine possible genotypes for the actual father. Specific sequences are examined to see if they were copied verbatim from one individual's genome; if so, then the genetic material of one individual could have been derived from that of the other (i.e. one is the parent of the other). If the alleged father cannot be excluded as the true father, then statistical analysis can be performed to assess how likely it is that the alleged father is the true father compared to a random man.

In addition to nuclear DNA, mitochondria contain their own genetic material known as mitochondrial DNA. This mitochondrial DNA is inherited solely from the mother and is passed down without any mixing. As a result, establishing a relationship through the comparison of the mitochondrial genome is generally easier than doing so with the nuclear genome. However, testing the mitochondrial DNA can only confirm whether two individuals share a maternal ancestry; it cannot be used to determine paternity. Therefore, its application is somewhat limited.

In testing the paternity of a male child, the Y chromosome can be used for comparison, as it is inherited directly from father to son. Like mitochondrial DNA, the Y chromosome is passed down through the paternal line. This means that the two brothers share the same Y chromosome from their father. Therefore, if one brother is the alleged father, his biological brother could also be the father based solely on Y chromosomal data. This holds true for any male relative related to the suspected father along the paternal line. For this reason, autosomal DNA testing would provide a more accurate method for determining paternity.

In the US, the AABB has established regulations for DNA paternity and family relationship testing, although AABB accreditation is not mandatory. DNA test results can be considered legally admissible if the collection and processing adhere to a proper chain of custody. Similarly, in Canada, the SCC has regulations on DNA paternity and relationship testing, while accreditation is recommended, it is not required.

The Paternity Testing Commission of the International Society for Forensic Genetics is responsible for creating biostatistical recommendations by the ISO/IEC 17025 standards. Biostatistical evaluations of paternity should be based on the likelihood ratio principle, resulting in the Paternity Index (PI). These recommendations offer guidance on the concepts of genetic hypotheses, calculation concerns necessary for producing valid PIs, as well as addressing specific issues related to population genetics.

== History ==
The earliest method of parental testing was blood typing, relying on the inheritance of blood types, which were discovered in 1901. Scientists realized that blood types were genetically inherited in the 1920s, leading to the use of blood typing as a method of excluding or confirming possible paternity. In blood typing, the blood types, of the child and the alleged parents are compared to assess the possibility of a parental linkage. For instance, two type O parents can only have type O children, while type B parents can have type B or O offspring. However, this method was limited, excluding about 30% of potential parents based solely on blood type.

In the 1930s, serological testing improved the process by examining proteins in the blood, with an exclusion rate of around 40%. The 1960s brought Human Leukocyte Antigen (HLA) typing, which compared genetic markers in white blood cells, achieving about 80% accuracy but struggling to differentiate between close relatives.

The 1970s saw advancements with the discovery of restriction enzyme, leading to Restriction Fragment Length Polymorphism ( RFLP) testing in the 1980s, which offered high accuracy. By the 1990s, Polymerase Chain Reaction (PCR) became the standard, providing faster, simpler, and more accurate results with exclusion rates of 99.99% or higher, revolutionizing parental testing in both legal and familial matters.

== Legal evidence ==
A DNA parentage test that adheres to a strict chain of custody can produce legally admissible results used for various purposes, including child support, inheritance, social welfare benefits, immigration, and adoption. To meet the chain-of-custody legal requirements, all tested individuals must be properly identified, and their specimens must be collected by an independent third-party who is not related to any of the tested parties and has no interest in the test's outcome. The quantum of evidence needed is clear and convincing evidence, meaning that it is more substantial than in an ordinary civil case but less than the “beyond a reasonable doubt” standard needed for a criminal conviction.

In recent years, immigration authorities in multiple countries- including the United States, United Kingdom, Canada, Australia, France, and others, may accept DNA parentage test results from immigration petitioners and beneficiaries in a family-based immigration case when primary documents that prove biological relationships are missing or inadequate.

In the U.S., it is the responsibility of immigration applicants to arrange and cover the cost of DNA testing. U.S. immigration authorities mandate that any DNA test performed must be conducted by a laboratory accredited by the AABB (formerly the American Association of Blood Banks). Similarly, in Canada, the laboratory must be certified by the Standards Council of Canada.

Although paternity tests are more prevalent than maternity tests, there are situations where the biological mother of the child is uncertain. Examples include cases in which an adopted child seeks to reunite with their biological mother, potential hospital mix-ups, and in vitro fertilization scenarios where an unrelated embryo may have been implanted in the mother.

Other factors, such as new laws regarding reproductive technologies involving donated eggs and sperm or surrogate mothers, can also complicate the determination of legal motherhood. For instance, in Canada, the federal Human Assisted Reproduction Act allows for the use of hired surrogate mothers, meaning that the legal mother may be the egg donor rather than the woman who gave birth. Similar laws exist in the United Kingdom and Australia.

In Brazil in 2019, two male identical twins were ordered to both pay maintenance for a child fathered by one of them because the father could not be identified with DNA.

== Legal issues ==
=== Australia ===
Peace-of-mind parentage tests are readily available online. However, for a parentage test (whether paternity or maternity) to be admissible in legal matters—such as changing a birth certificate, proceeding with Family Law Court cases, applying for visas or citizenship, or making child support claims—it must comply with the Family Law Regulations 2024 (Cth). Additionally, the laboratory that processes the samples must be accredited by the National Association of Testing Authorities (NATA).

=== Canada ===
Personal paternity-testing kits are available for use. In Canada, the Standards Council regulates paternity testing, ensuring that laboratories are ISO 17025 approved. Only a limited number of laboratories possess this approval, making it advisable to have tests conducted at these accredited facilities. Additionally, courts can order paternity tests during divorce proceedings.

=== China ===
In China, paternity testing is legally available for fathers who suspect that a child may not be theirs. Chinese law also mandates a paternity test for any child born outside the one-child policy in order for the child to be eligible for a Hukou, which is a family registration record. Additionally, family ties established by adoption can only be confirmed through a paternity test. Each year, a significant number of Chinese citizens seek paternity testing, leading to the emergence of many unlicensed and illegal testing centers being set up.

=== France ===
DNA paternity testing is conducted only at the discretion of a judge during judicial proceedings aimed at either establishing or contesting paternity, or for the purposes of obtaining or denying child support. Non-consensual private DNA paternity testing is illegal, even if carried out through laboratories in other countries. Violation of this law is punishable by up to one year in prison and a fine of €15,000. The French Council of State has described the purpose of this law as upholding the "French regime of filiation" and preserving "the peace of families".

=== Germany ===
Under the Gene Diagnostics Act of 2009, secret paternity testing is prohibited. Any paternity test must be conducted by a licensed physician or an expert with a university degree in science and specialized education in parentage testing. Additionally, the laboratory performing the genetic testing must be accredited according to ISO/IEC 17025. Full informed consent from both parents is required for testing. Prenatal paternity testing is also prohibited, except in cases of sexual abuse and rape. If genetic testing is performed without the other parent's consent, the offender may face a fine of €5,000.

Furthermore, due to an amendment to civil law section 1598a in 2005, a man who contests paternity no longer automatically loses his legal rights and obligations regarding the child.

=== Israel ===
A paternity test that holds legal standing must be ordered by a family court. Although parents can access "peace of mind" parental tests from overseas laboratories, family courts are not obliged to accept these tests as evidence. Additionally, it is illegal to collect genetic material for a paternity test from a minor over 16 years of age without the minor's consent.

Family courts have the authority to order paternity tests even against the father's wishes in cases involving divorce, child support, and other matters like determining heirs or settling population registry questions. A man who wishes to prove that he is not the father of a child registered as his is entitled to a paternity test, regardless of the mother and guardian's objections.

Paternity tests are not conducted if there is a belief that it could lead to the mother's death. Until 2007, such tests were also not ordered when there was a possibility that the child of a married woman could have been fathered by a man other than her husband, which would designate the child as a mamzer under Jewish law.

=== Philippines ===
DNA paternity testing for personal knowledge is legal, and home test kits can be obtained by mail from representatives of AABB- and ISO-certified laboratories. However, DNA paternity testing intended for official purposes, such as child support (sustento) and inheritance disputes, must adhere to the Rule on DNA Evidence A.M. No. 06-11-5-SC, which was issued by the Philippine Supreme Court on October 15, 2007. In some cases, courts may order these tests when proof of paternity is needed.

=== Spain ===
In Spain, peace-of-mind paternity tests are a "big business," partly due to the French ban on paternity testing, with many genetic testing companies being based in Spain.

=== United Kingdom ===
In the United Kingdom, there were previously no restrictions on paternity tests until the Human Tissue Act 2004 came into effect in September 2006. Section 45 of this Act states that it is an offense to possess any human bodily material without appropriate consent if the intent is to analyze its DNA. Legally recognized fathers are allowed access to paternity-testing services under these new regulations, provided that the DNA being tested is their own. Courts may sometimes order tests when proof of paternity is necessary. In the UK, the Ministry of Justice accredits organizations that are authorized to conduct these tests. The Department of Health produced a voluntary code of practice on genetic paternity testing in 2001, which is currently under review. Responsibility for this code has been transferred to the Human Tissue Authority. In the 2018 case of Anderson V Spencer, the Court of Appeal allowed DNA samples obtained from a deceased person to be used for paternity testing for the first time.

=== United States ===
In the United States, paternity testing is legal, and fathers may test their children without the consent or knowledge of the mother. Paternity testing take-home kits are readily available for purchase, though their results are not admissible in court and are for personal knowledge only.

Only a court-ordered paternity test may be used as evidence in court proceedings. If parental testing is being submitted for legal purposes, including immigration, testing must be ordered through a lab that has AABB accreditation for relationship DNA testing.

The legal implications of a parentage result test vary by state and according to whether the putative parents are unmarried or married. If a parentage test does not meet forensic standards for the state in question, a court-ordered test may be required for the results of the test to be admissible for legal purposes. For unmarried parents, if a parent is currently receiving child support or custody, but DNA testing later proves that the man is not the father, support automatically stops. However, in many states, this testing must be performed during a narrow window of time if a voluntary acknowledgment of parentage form has already been signed by the putative father; otherwise, the results of the test may be disregarded by law, and in many cases, a man may be required to pay child support, though the child is biologically unrelated. In a few states, if the mother is receiving the support, then that alleged father has the right to file a lawsuit to get back any money that he lost from paying support. As of 2011, in most states, unwed parents confronted with a voluntary acknowledgment of parentage form are informed of the possibility and right to request a DNA paternity test. If testing is refused by the mother, the father may not be required to sign the birth certificate or the voluntary acknowledgement of parentage form for the child. For wedded putative parents, the husband of the mother is presumed to be the father of the child. But, in most states, this presumption can be overturned by the application of a forensic paternity test; in many states, the time for overturning this presumption may be limited to the first few years of the child's life.

== Reverse paternity testing ==
Reverse paternity determination is the ability to establish the biological father when the father of that person is not available. The test uses the STR alleles in the mother and her child, other children and brothers of the alleged father, and the deduction of the genetic constitution of the father by the basis of genetic laws, all to create a rough amalgamation. This can compare the father's DNA when a direct sample of the father's DNA is unavailable. An episode of Solved shows this test being used to know if a blood sample matches the victim of a kidnapping.

== See also ==
- Paternity fraud
- Mosaicism and chimerism, rare genetic conditions that can result in false negative results on DNA-based tests
- Non-paternity event
- Lauren Lake's Paternity Court, a television series that debuted in fall 2013

Genetic:

- Heritability
- List of Mendelian traits in humans
