= Kaman-Kalehöyük =

Archaeological site in Kırşehir Province, Turkey

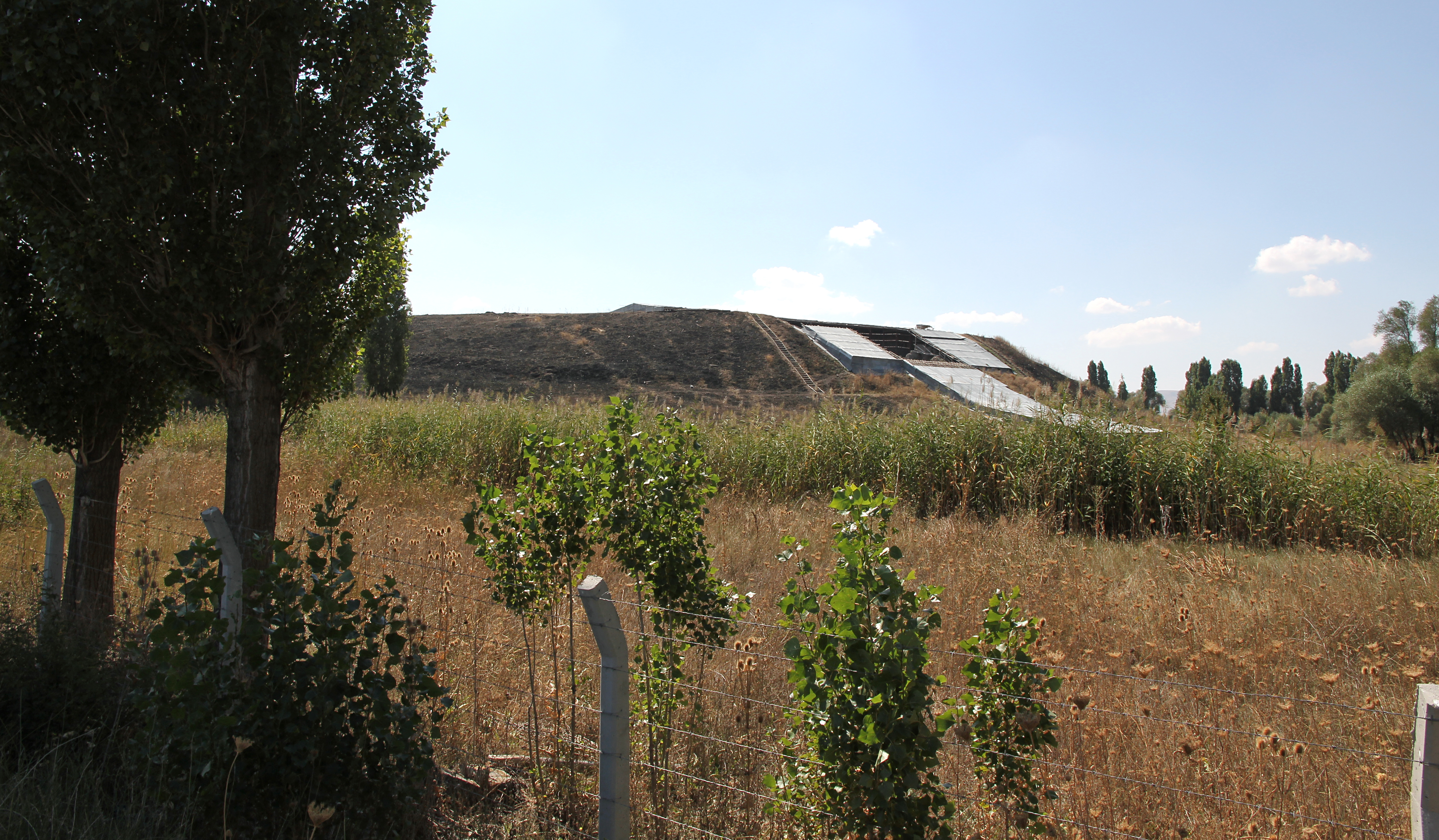

- Location within Turkey
- 39°21′46″N 33°47′12″E
- Location: Turkey
- Region: Kırşehir Province

Kaman-Kalehöyük is a multi-period archaeological site in Kırşehir Province, Turkey, around 100 km south east of Ankara, 6 km east of the town center of Kaman. It is a tell or mound site that was occupied during the Bronze Age, Iron Age and Ottoman periods. Excavations in the mound have been carried out since 1986 under the direction of Sachihiro Omura, on behalf of the Middle Eastern Culture Center in Japan and the Japanese Anatolian Archeology Institute. The distance to Hattusa, the Hittite capital, is about 100 km.

== History ==
The following is adapted from Omura 2011, pp. 1099–1100.

According to the Japanese archaeologists,: “In the levels belonging to the 2nd millennium B.C., a succession of cultural levels can be clearly seen, from the Assyrian Colony Period, Old Hittite Kingdom, and Hittite Empire Period.”

=== Bronze Age ===
Occupation since the last phase of Early Bronze, Middle Bronze (Assyrian Trade Colonies), and Late Bronze (Hittite period).

==== Early Bronze ====
IV: Pre-Hittite period

- IVb Early Bronze Age
- IVa Intermediate Period (c. 2100 BCE)

==== Middle Bronze ====
III: continuation from EB IV. Pottery had heavy minearals in fabrics until around 1970 BCE, when Assyrian merchants introduced new techniques.

III: Assyrian period

III: Hittite period

- IIIc 20th ~ 17th century BC Assyrian colonies

In 2005, metallurgical analysis by Hideo Akanuma of iron fragments found at Kaman-Kalehöyük in 1994 and dating to c. 1800 BCE revealed that some of these fragments were composed of carbon steel; these currently form the world's earliest known evidence for steel manufacture. This was further confirmed in a 2023 study, which also found that the carbon content in these iron and steel artifacts was rather variable. According to the authors, this indicates the continuing experimentation by these early metallurgists, and illustrates "the range in early efforts to smelt iron".

==== Late Bronze ====
- IIIb 17th ~ 15th century BC Old Hatti Empire
- IIIa 15th ~ 12th century BC Hittite empire

Some of the oldest glass in the world has been found at Kaman. This glass is estimated to be 3600-year-old [1600 BC].

=== Iron Age ===
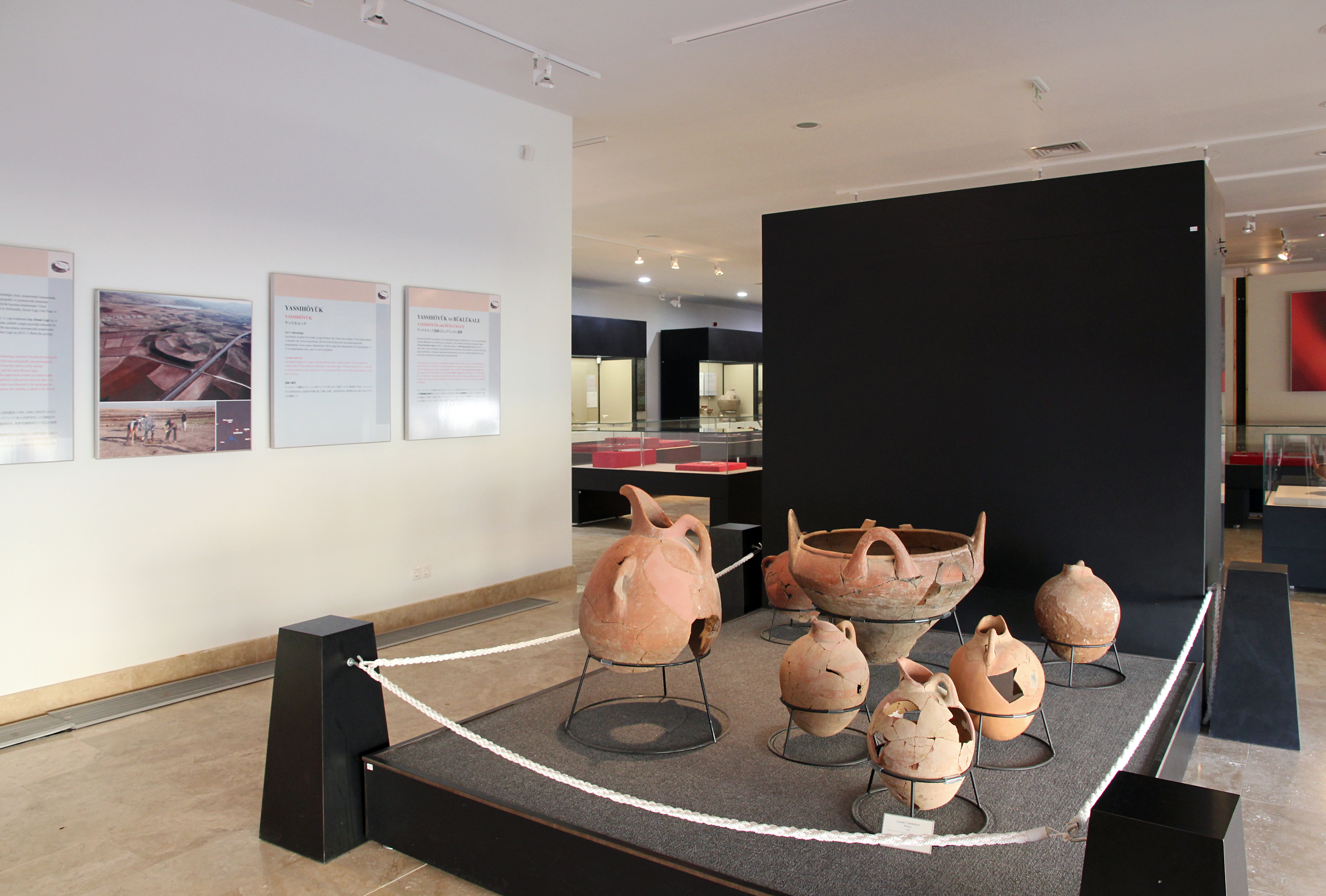
Artifacts from the site in the Kaman-Kalehöyük Archaeological Museum

Then, from the 12th century onward after the Hittite Empire collapsed, it is generally believed that a "Dark Age" had occurred in Anatolia, during which there were no significant cultural developments. So this period is believed to have lasted until the 8th century. But the excavations of Stratum IId at Kaman-Kalehöyük that belonged to the early part of this period (Early Iron Age) showed that life and cultural developments continued on this site.

In 550 BC, Kırşehir and its region, along with the whole of Anatolia, came under Persian rule. Although no significant settlement remains and finds belonging to this period were found in Kırşehir, seals belonging to the Persian period were found in the Kaman Kale Höyük excavation. It is learned from the sources that there was a settlement named Zama here in ancient times. During the period of the Kingdom of Cappadocia, which was established in 333 BC, Kırşehir and its region were under intense pressure due to the lack of authority. In 18 AD, the Roman Emperor Tiberius officially annexed Cappadocia to Rome and made it a state. During the Roman period, the Kırşehir region spread rapidly in Christianity as well as paganism. In the Kaman region, there are remains of Byzantine buildings and the ruins of Ömerhacılı Castle. This indicates that there was a Byzantine settlement in the region.

II: Iron Age settlements finds: Fibulae and arrowheads, including some in Scythians style. Decorative plates made of animal bones, painted ceramics. In addition, Phrygian, Achaemenid and possibly one Elamite stamp seal were found.

- IIa1–2 Hellenistic period (Alexander the Great and later)
- IIa3–5 Late Iron Age (Lydian, Achaemenid)
- IIa6–IIc1 Middle Iron Age (Phrygian rule)
- IIc2–3 Middle Iron Age (Alişar IV)
- IId1–3 Early Iron Age (Dark Age )

=== Middle Ages ===
I: Middle Ages (finds: hair brooches, 1 ceramic bowl, earrings and finger rings, stone lamp, coins, etc.)

- Ia Ottoman period
- Ib Byzantine period

== Buklukale ==
The site of Büklükale is located about 50km northhwest of Kaman-Kalehöyük. It is 32 hectares in area, and was originally settled in the Early Bronze Age. In the Late Bronze Age it became a part of the Hittite Empire. The archaeological history of Buklukale is similar to Kaman.

The location of Büklükale is significant because it is situated on the west bank at the narrowest point of the Kızılırmak River and served as an important crossing point through the ages.

== Kaman Kalehöyük Archaeological Museum ==
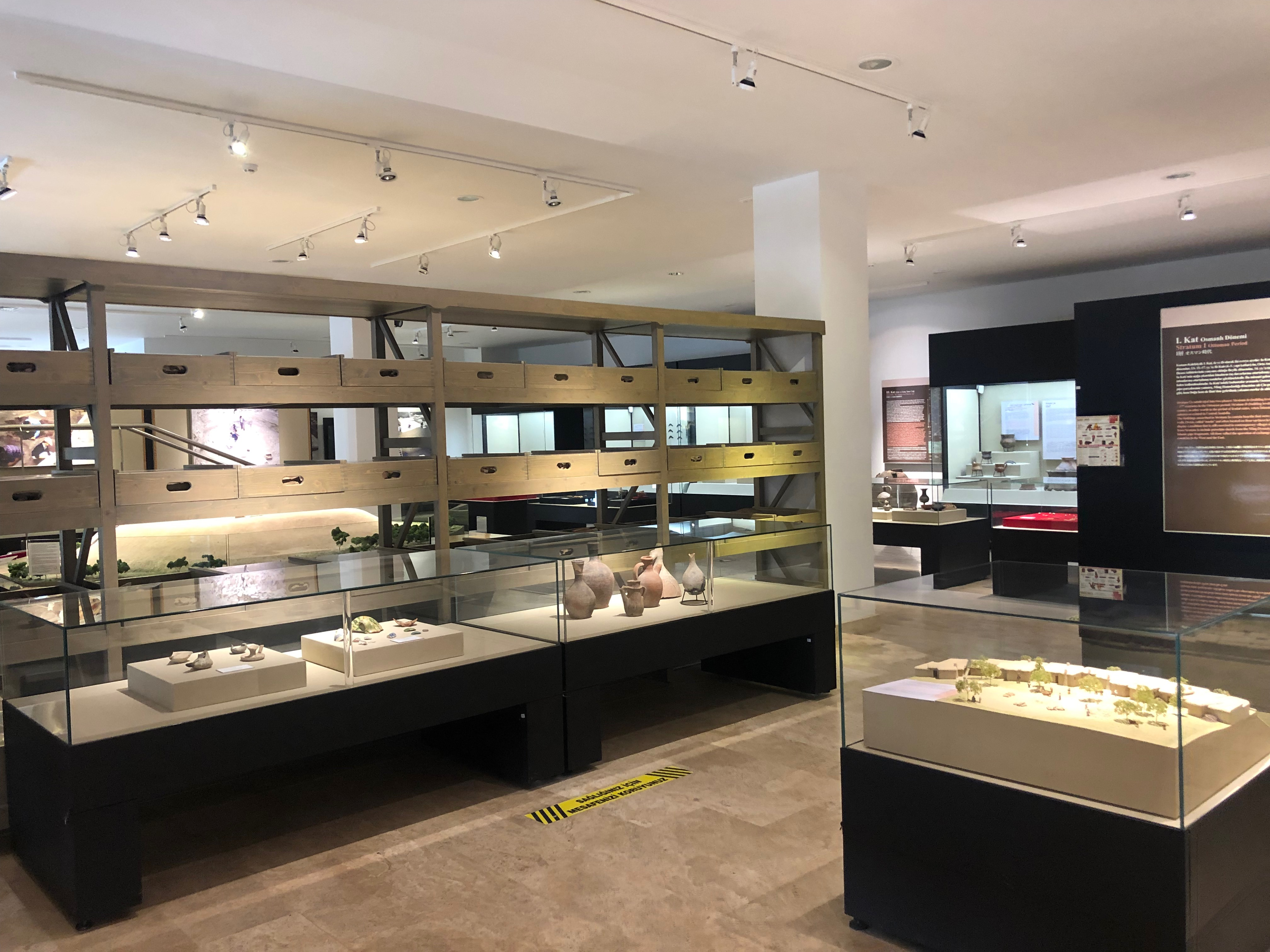
Display at Kaman Kalehöyük Archeological Museum

Kaman Kalehöyük Archaeological Museum, which was made as a grant by the Japanese Government within the framework of the "Cultural Heritage Preservation Project", was opened in 2010. It covers a total area of 1,500 square meters, 830 square meters of which is open and 470 square meters of which is enclosed. It is located about 2km south of the site.

In the museum, there are exhibition halls, a cine-vision corner, a library, a laboratory, cafe, warehouses and technical sections that allow examination, research, photography and restoration work.

The landscaping is arranged in the style of an excavated mound. Thus, the visitors were provided to see both the finds unearthed during the excavations and the excavation methods and works. Also, the largest botanical garden outside of Japan is built in a "Japanese garden" style. The museum received the "Best green museum" award in 2011 and was nominated for the Museum of the Year in Europe in 2012.

== See also ==
- Cities of the ancient Near East

== Literature ==
- Masao Mori, Sachhiro Omura: A Preliminary Report on the Excavations at Kaman-Kalehöyük in Turkey, in: P. Mikasa (Hrsg.): Essays on Ancient Anatolia and its surrounding Civilizations. Harrassowitz Verlag, Wiesbaden 1995.
- Masako Omura: Stamp Seals from Kaman-Kalehöyük dated from the 1st Millennium B.C., in: P. Mikasa (Hrsg.): Essays on Ancient Anatolia and its surrounding Civilizations. Harrassowitz Verlag, Wiesbaden 1995.
- Sachihiro Omura: Preliminary Report on the 22nd Excavation Season at Kaman-Kalehöyük in 2007. In: Anatolian Archaeological Studies 17, 2008, S. 1–43 PDF.
- Sachihiro Omura: Kaman-Kalehöyük Excavations in Central Anatolia. In: Sharon Steadman (Hrsg.): Oxford Handbook of Ancient Anatolia, Oxford University Press, Oxford 2011, S. 1099–1110.
