= Büklükale =

Archaeological site in Kırıkkale province, Turkey

- Location within Turkey
- 39°35′0″N 33°25′42″E
- Periods: Bronze Age
- Cultures: Hittite
- Location: Turkey
- Region: Kırıkkale province

Site notes
- Area: 30 ha (74 acres)

Büklükale is an archaeological site located in Kırıkkale province, central Turkey near the town of Karakeçili. It is located about 50 km northwest from yet another important archaeological site of Kaman-Kalehöyük. The site is about 30 hectares in area. During the Middle Bronze Age, Buklukale became a part of the Hittite Empire.

The location of Büklükale is significant because it is situated on the west bank at the narrowest point of the Kızılırmak River and served as an important crossing point through the ages. There is a Seljuk (13th century A.D.) bridge there, and the remains of a Roman bridge.

== Identification ==
Büklükale has been suggested as the site of two different cities known from Hittite and Assyrian texts, Durhumit/Turmitta and Wahshushana, both important centers of Assyrian trade in the karum period. Wahshushana was rarely mentioned in texts after the end of the karum period and the rise of the Hittite empire. Since the archaeological evidence indicates that Büklükale remained an important site during the empire period, the identification with Durhumit may be the correct one.

== History ==
The site was settled in the Early Bronze Age period (the third millennium BC).

=== Early Bronze ===
In the Early Bronze, the Anatolian Trade Network may have crossed at this junction of the Kızılırmak River, connecting Central Anatolia with Western Anatolia (Asia Minor).

=== Middle Bronze ===
In the Middle Bronze, the site was an important crossing on the Kızılırmak River for trade routes going east to west. It may have been part of the Assyrian Trade Network. Compared with the Early Bronze, Central Anatolia was less focused on trade with Western Anatolia, which became more directed towards the Aegean. In contrast, Central Anatolia trade moved eastwards to the Assyrians.

There was a walled Lower Town over-topped by a rocky outcrop at the riverside which contained significant buildings surrounded by a 7-meter-high cyclopean wall. According to the excavators the upper city buildings were built around 1980 BC, destroyed around 1860 BC, and then rebuilt to be destroyed again in 1680 BC.

==== Oldest glass ====
Some of the oldest glass in the world has been found at Büklükale and the nearby Kaman-Kalehöyük. This glass is estimated to be 3600-year-old [1600 BC].

=== Late Bronze ===
==== Hittite Period ====
The Kızılırmak river functions as a border with the Hittite Kingdom proper on the east side and the imperial frontier on the west side. Major roads went from Central Anatolia to Afyon.

A fragment of a Hittite cuneiform tablet was found here during excavations in 2010. This is the most westerly find of any cuneiform tablet in Turkey to date. The tablet has since been transcribed and translated. Recently a tablet was found written in the Hurrian language containing a purification ritual.

== Excavations ==
The Japanese archaeological team from the Japanese Institute of Anatolian Archaeology that excavated Kaman-Kalehöyük also conducted excavations here under the direction of K. Matsumura beginning in 2009.
