= Forensic Science International: Genetics =

- Discipline: Forensic science
- Language: English
- Edited by: Angel Carracedo

Publication details
- History: 2007–present
- Publisher: Elsevier for the International Society for Forensic Genetics
- Frequency: Bimonthly
- Impact factor: 4.884 (2018)

Standard abbreviations
- ISO 4: Forensic Sci. Int. Genet.

Indexing
- Forensic Science International: Genetics
- ISSN: 1872-4973
- OCLC no.: 901016687
- Forensic Science International: Genetics Supplement Series
- ISSN: 1875-1768
- OCLC no.: 605195741

Links
- Journal homepage; Online access

Forensic Science International: Genetics is a peer-reviewed academic journal of forensic science, dedicated to the applications of genetics in the administration of justice. The journal was established in 2007 and is published by Elsevier. The journal is edited by Angel Carracedo (University of Santiago de Compostela). The journal publishes supplements in Forensic Science International: Genetics Supplement Series since 2008, seven of them in total, the last one appearing in 2019. These are dedicated to publish the proceedings of the biannual congresses of the International Society for Forensic Genetics.

== Abstracting and Indexing ==
Forensic Science International is abstracted and indexed in the following databases:

- EMBASE
- MEDLINE/Excerpta Medica
- Scopus

== See also ==
- Forensic Science International
