= International Society for Forensic Genetics =

International non-profit scientific society founded in 1968

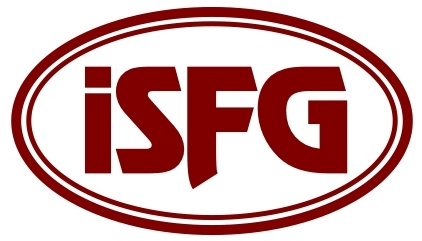
- Abbreviation: ISFG
- Formation: 1968
- Purpose: The society aims to promote scientific knowledge in the field of genetic markers as applied to forensic science.
- Members: 1,400
- President: John M. Butler
- Vice President: Walther Parson
- Secretary: Peter M. Schneider
- Website: www.isfg.org

The International Society for Forensic Genetics (ISFG) is an international non-profit scientific society founded in 1968. The goal of the society is to advance the field of forensic genetics, also termed DNA profiling. ISFG holds bi-annual conferences, as well as workshops and seminars and published the journal Forensic Science International: Genetics.

== History ==
The International Society for Forensic Genetics – ISFG – was founded in 1968 in Mainz, Germany, under the name Gesellschaft für forensische Blutgruppenkunde (Society for Forensic Haemogenetics). The society was founded as a non-profit organisation according to German civil law. The original aim of the society was to promote the science of genetic markers in human blood for use in forensic science. In 1989, the society was transformed to an international society (International Society for Forensic Haemogenetics – ISFH). In 1991, based on the transition from traditional serological markers in blood to universal DNA polymorphisms the name was changed into International Society for Forensic Genetics. The ISFG's goal is to support research interests in forensic genetics, also including non-human DNA studies, RNA-based test systems, and large-scale sequencing technologies.

== Membership and activities ==
=== Membership ===
In January 2020, the society had approximately 1,400 individual members from more than 60 countries. The members are typically in academic institutions, criminal justice and police organizations, as well as private companies. Their fields of expertise include forensic biology, molecular genetics, population genetics, blood group serology, forensic pathology, parentage testing, biostatistics, criminal law, medical ethics.

Honorary members of the ISFG include Erik Essen-Möller, Alsbäck/Lysekil, Sweden; Ruth Sanger, London, UK; Otto Prokop, Berlin, Germany; Konrad Hummel, Freiburg, Germany; Sir Alec Jeffreys, Leicester, UK.

=== International ISFG congresses ===
The society organises biennial international congresses, with educational workshops preceding the congress. From 1985–2005, conference volumes with short articles based on these presentations were originally published as books under the title Advances in Forensic Haemogenetics and later as Progress in Forensic Genetics.

Since 2007, the proceedings have been published electronically as part of the Forensic Science International: Genetics Supplement Series and can be accessed online. Past meetings have been held mainly but not exclusively in Europe. The meetings often serve as a focal point for a dialogue of relevant scientific issues, as in the 2007 Single-nucleotide polymorphism (SNP) panel discussion, or the debate on the limits of low template DNA in forensic genetics.

=== The DNA Commission ===
The DNA Commission of the ISFG functions as an international DNA expert advisory group. While not binding, their recommendations are a first step to establishing standards for new genetic typing methods. ISFG recommendations are a valuable tool for forensic geneticists and as such are highly cited by other scientists.

Shortly after the implementation of polymerase chain reaction (PCR) based short tandem repeat (STR) DNA testing, the society was instrumental in the standardization of allele designations, a key component in inter-laboratory data comparability and the creation of national DNA databases. DNA commission topics also have included best practices for paternity and relationship testing now integrated into forensic genetics textbooks. All published recommendations of the DNA and the Paternity Testing Commissions can be accessed openly on the ISFG website.

=== Language-based working parties ===
The ISFG has language-based working groups for Chinese, English, French, German, Italian, Korean, Polish and Spanish-Portuguese members. The English Speaking Working Group (ESWG) offers an annual proficiency testing exercise for paternity testing laboratories. The Relationship Testing Workshop is open to all members of the ESWG and each year, blood samples, a questionnaire and a paper challenge are sent to the participating laboratories.

=== The European DNA Profiling Group ===
The European DNA Profiling Group (EDNAP) was established in 1988 to harmonize DNA technologies for criminal investigations so that DNA results could be exchanged across the borders in Europe. In 1991, the group was included among the working groups of the society. It consists of approximately 20 European laboratories and collaborates closely with the DNA Working Group of the European Network of Forensic Science Institutes (ENFSI).

EDNAP organises collaborative exercises in order to explore the possibility of standardization of new forensic genetic methods. The results are published in peer-reviewed journals. One resource resulting from these activities is the "EDNAP mitochondrial DNA Population Database", short EMPOP, which is being maintained by the Institute for Legal Medicine of the Innsbruck Medical University, Austria. This database allows for the determination of the statistical weight of evidence for forensic mitochondrial DNA-typing results.
