= Haplogroup G-P303 =

Human Y-chromosome DNA haplogroup

Haplogroup G-P303 (G2a2b2a)
- Possible time of origin: more than 11,000 years BP
- Ancestor: Haplogroup G2a2b2 (CTS2488)
- Descendants: G2a2b2a1, G2a2b2a2, G2a2b2a3, G2a2b2a4
- Defining mutations: P303 or S135 (G2a2b2a)

In human genetics, Haplogroup G-P303 (G2a2b2a, formerly G2a3b1) is a Y-chromosome haplogroup. It is a branch of haplogroup G (Y-DNA) (M201). In descending order, G-P303 is additionally a branch of G2 (P287), G2a (P15), G2a2, G2a2b, G2a2b2, and finally G2a2b2a. This haplogroup represents the majority of haplogroup G men in most areas of Europe west of Russia and the Black Sea. To the east, G-P303 is found among G persons across the Middle East, Iran, the southern Caucasus area, China, and India. G-P303 exhibits its highest diversity in the Levant.

== Genetic features ==
All G-P303 men carry the P303 or S135 SNP Y-DNA mutation. There are also some short tandem repeat (STR) findings among G-P303 men which help in subgrouping them. Many of the men have an unusual value of 13 for marker DYS388, and some have 9 at DYS568. STR marker oddities are often different in each G-P303 subgroup, and characteristic marker values can vary by subgroup. Often the values of STR markers DYS391, DYS392 and DYS393, however, are respectively 10, 11 and 14 or some slight variation on these for all G-P303 men.

P303 first became available for public testing in fall 2008, and the P designation indicates it was identified at the University of Arizona. The mutation is found on the Y chromosome at position 20104736. The forward primer is TTCTTATTTGCTTTGAAACTCAG. The reverse primer is ATTGGCTTATCAGATTGACG. The mutation involves replacement of T by C. This mutation was actually first identified as S135 at Ethnoancestry in London, England, but it took some time to realize that P303, which was independently identified, and S135 were the same.

== Dating of G-P303 origin ==
Yfull dates TMRCA of all P303 in their database to 11,000 BP, and TMRCA with sibling PF3359 to 14,000. Yfull datings tend to be regarded as a quarter too young.

== Old World geographical distribution ==
In Europe, G-P303 definable subgroups make up a majority of Haplogroup G persons west of Russia and the Black Sea, and small numbers are also found in North Africa. The Baltic countries have the lowest population percentage of G-P303. Scandinavia is similar, showing less than half the percentages of G persons seen in the countries to the south. G-P303 seems to represent the same percentage of the population in both central and southern Europe, and usually represents half or more of the G seen in the population in these areas. G-P303 is also found among the Crimean Karaites.

To the east, G-P303 samples are found in North Africa (Morocco, Tunisia, Libya and Egypt), in the Middle East (Israel (found among Jews, Arabs, and Druze), Lebanon, Iran (reaching its highest at about 15% of Khuzestan Arabs), Turkey, Jordan, Saudi Arabia, Yemen, and Dubai), the Caucasus Mountains area (Armenia, Georgia, Azerbaijan, Kabardinians, Abazinia, Uzbekistan, and scattered among ethnic groups of northwestern China and Russian Siberia. A distinctive Indian type of G-P303 exists, but its prevalence is unclear. An isolated G-P303 sample from Malaysia exists.

=== Concentrations of G-P303 at certain sites ===
The highest percentage of G-P303 persons in a discrete population so far described, 86%, is in the Tuapsinsky District, Krasnodar Krai, Russia, among Shapsugs.

In Western Europe, one of the highest percentages is on the island of Ibiza off the eastern Spanish coast. All of the available G samples from Ibiza are typical G-P303 samples based on STR marker values. In total, about 16% of its population is likely G-P303 on the same basis. These samples include many identifiable persons from the DYS388=13 subgroup, and are also commonly seen in Sephardic Jewish samples. Haplogroup G (P303) in Ibiza is likely representative of the significant population of Crypto-Jews who came there fleeing the Spanish Expulsion and Inquisition.

The percentage of haplogroup G among available samples from Wales is overwhelmingly G-P303. Such a high percentage is not found in nearby England, Scotland or Ireland.

== G-P303+* ==
The asterisk indicates negativity for G-P303's only subgroup. This category was established in April, 2010 because of the determination then, that persons with the L140 SNP mutation comprise a separate subgroup of G-P303. G-M278, G-Z6885, G-Z30503 and G-L140 are the known subgroups

=== G-L140 ===
Persons in this category have the L140 SNP mutation. L140 was identified at Family Tree DNA in 2009, but the determination that not all G-P303 person have this mutation was not made until April, 2010. This mutation is located at chromosome position 7630859, and is a deletion. The bulk of L140+ men belong to L140 subgroups.

==== G-U1 and its subgroups ====
U1 was first identified at the University of Central Florida in 2006 but it was not described in a publication until 2009. The listed technical specifications are:....location rs9785956.....forward primer is TTTCTGCTCCAAATCTGCTG....reverse primer is CACCTGTAATCGGGAGGCTA....the mutation involves a change from A to G.

A high percentage of all tested European U1+ persons so far are positive for the subgroup in which the L13 or S13 SNP mutation is present. In contrast the bulk of the non-Europeans (mostly in the western Caucasus Mountains) belong to the L1266 subgroup of U1.

===== G-L13/S13 =====
Almost all L13+ persons of European ancestry have the value of 12 or 13 at STR marker DYS385a and values of 19,20 at STR marker YCA. There are a few L13+ samples available which lack these mutations, and a shared common ancestor farther back in time from the others can be presumed for these samples.

The L13/S13 SNP was first identified at the University of Central Florida in 2006 as the U13 SNP, but prior to the publication of the details of this research in 2009, the SNP was also independently identified in 2008 at Family Tree DNA in Houston, Texas, as L13 and at Ethnoancestry in England as S13 and made available for public testing. The technical specifications are given as.....Y chromosome location rs9786706.....forward primer is GTGGTAACAGCTCCTGGTGAG.....reverse primer is TGCTGCTTTGGTTAACTGTCC...the mutation involves a change from C to T.

The L13 subgroup is most common in north central Europe and is found in almost all places in Europe where other types of G are seen, but this subgroup seems uncommon in almost all countries outside Europe. Outside Europe L13 is seen most commonly in the Near East.

The Haplogroup G Project has indicated among its large G collection that likely or proven G-L13 STR samples comprise the following percentages of available G samples in the following European countries [in descending order]:

Germany, 16%.....Italy, 11%.....Netherlands, 10%.....France, 10%.....Poland, 9%.....Spain, 9%.....Ireland, 6%.....England, 5%.....Switzerland, 4%

A small, overwhelmingly English, subgroup of L13/S13 exists and is designated as L1263. This was first identified at Family Tree DNA in summer, 2012, and represents a mutation from G to A at chromosome position 8111187.

===== G-L1266 =====
The L1266 mutation was first identified at Family Tree DNA in July, 2012. Early indications are that it encompasses a high percentage of U1 men who do not belong to U1's L13 subgroup. The L1266 mutation is found at position 15412419 on the chromosome and represents a mutation from A to G. Some L1266 men also belong to a L1266 subgroup consisting of men with the L1264, L1265 and L1268 mutations. These were identified at the same time as L1266 at Family Tree DNA. L1264 is at position 7704368, mutation A to G; L1265 at position 12741229, mutation A to G; and L1268 at position 20081319, T to C.

==== G-L497 subgroups ====
The largest subgroup in Europe based on available samples is with men having the L497 mutation. This SNP was first identified in January, 2011, in testing at 23andMe and made available for separate testing at L497 by Family Tree DNA. The chromosome locations are given as 15932714 and rs35141399, and the mutation is from C to T. The forward primer is ATGAGTGGCCTCACCAAGGGAATC and reverse primer is ATGGGCAACAGGTGTCCTGAAG.

A high percentage of men with L497 have the value of 13 at STR marker DYS388. This is a rare mutation from the ancestral value of 12. A very small number of men within this DYS388=13 subgroup seem to have mutated yet again to 12 or 14. The geographical distribution of this 13 mutation and other features were first described in a research journal in 2007. Percentages of DYS388=13 men within G samples are particularly high in northwestern Europe. Some DYS388=13 subgroups below are based on SNP mutations and others on STR marker value oddities.

Most L497 men belong to its subgroup Z725.

The Haplogroup G Project has indicated among its large G collection that likely or proven STR samples from the DYS388=13 type, comprise the following percentages of available G samples in the following countries [in descending order]:

Switzerland, 74%.....Spain, 60%.....France, 58%....Germany, 57%.....England, 54%....Ireland, 48%.....Netherlands, 45%.....Italy, 43%....Poland, 29%....India, 0%

The Polish percentage of DYS388=13 men is diminished solely because of the origins of a significant group of G2c men in that country. Without the G2c group, the DYS388=13 percentage is 50%. The German G samples are much more numerous in the southwestern part of the country.

Based on marker values, the only non-European DYS388=13 sample that has surfaced from the Old World that has similar STR marker values to the Europeans is a single sample from Egypt.

The paucity of proven samples from outside Europe so far leaves open the possibility this DYS388 mutation originated in a European.

Borbély et al. (2023) analyzed 115 whole mitogenomes and 92 Y-chromosomal Short Tandem Repeat (STR) and Single Nucleotide Polymorphism (SNP) profiles from a Hungarian ethnic group, the Székelys, living in southeast Transylvania (Romania), and concluded that the G-L497 subhaplogroup likely originated from Central Europe and has been mostly prevalent in European populations since the Neolithic period. The G-L497 lineage could potentially be associated with the Linear Pottery culture-Linearbandkeramik (LBK) culture of Central Europe.

G-L497 have been found in high percentages among early Alpine Celts (37%) from Southern Germany associated with the Hallstatt culture, and Iron Age Etruscans (6-7%) from Italy.

==== G-Z725 ====
Z725 was first identified by a citizen researcher among data for a single sample in the 1000 Genomes Project in summer 2011, but it was not until summer 2012 that it was confirmed in testing at Family Tree DNA as a separate subgroup. This L497 subgroup is the most common G subgroup in Europe because a high percentage of L497 men are also Z725+. Z725 is found at chromosome position 7957070 and is a deletion.

==== G-L43+/S147+, L42-/S146- ====
This subgroup is rare because virtually all tested L43+/S147+ persons so far are also L42+/S146+.

The SNP was first identified in a listing of SNP results from testing at 23andMe. It was independently developed as a separate test by both Family Tree DNA as L43 and by Ethnoancestry as S147. In fall 2009 a test again at 23andMe provided information for the first time that a person who had the L43 mutation simultaneously lacked the L42 mutation that typically occurs with L43. This anomaly was verified by testing the same person at Family Tree DNA. So L43+/S147+ is now a separate category. The technical specifications for L43 are as follows: Y chromosome location 16446759....forward primer is GAGGTTTTCGGAGCTTACCTATAC....reverse primer is CACTGCTTGTAGATAGTAAAGTTTG.....the mutation involves change from A to G.

==== G-L43+/S147+, L42+/S146+ ====
About a fourth of DYS388=13 men have this L42/S146 mutation. Swiss men are more likely than average to belong to this subgroup. L42/S146 could be nearly as old as the DYS388=13 mutation based on the number of value differences seen in 67-marker STR samples.

The SNP was first identified in a listing of SNP results from testing at 23andMe. It was independently developed as a separate test by both Family Tree DNA as L42 and by Ethnoancestry as S146. The technical specifications for this SNP are as follows:....position on Y chromosome is 15170153.....forward primer is CTCACAATAGGCAGCATCCCCTCAG.....reverse primer is CAGAAAAAGGGAGCATATGACCAAGG.....the mutation involves a change from C to A.

==== DYS391=7 ====
This multi-value (multistep) mutation at STR marker DYS391 to the value of 7 from the original 10 is found in a group of Hispanic men.

==== DYS464a=9 ====
This multi-value (multistep) mutation at STR marker DYS464a to the value of 9 is found so far only in Swiss and German men.

==== DYS388=15 ====
This small subgroup is composed of men whose ancestor mutated two values at STR marker DYS388 to 15. Members of this subgroup must have other marker values similar to persons in the overall DYS388=13 subgroup. So far only persons of English ancestry belong to this DYS388=15 subgroup. Marker DYS388 rarely mutates, and a two-step (two-value) mutation is almost as valuable as a SNP mutation in identifying persons within this distinctive subgroup.

==== DYS393=12 with genetic nearness ====
This small subgroup is composed of men whose ancestor mutated at STR marker DYS393 to 12. This marker value is unusually low for G persons. The persons with this finding seem to report ancestral origins primarily in Cyprus based on current knowledge.

==== DYS594=12 with genetic nearness ====
While a mutation to a value of 12 from 10 or 11 is seen primarily in this group, there exist a few DYS594=12 men who do not belong to the group. The men in this group form a distinctive cluster of persons with closely related STR marker values in addition to the DYS594 oddity. This DYS594=12 subgroup has an unusually high percentage of Welsh surnames with the rest mostly of English ancestry based on available samples.

=== G-Z1903 subgroup ===
Z1903 men so far all have the value of 9 at STR marker DYS568 and less reliably 20,21 at marker YCA together with a close relationship based on STR marker values. The reason DYS568=9 can be used as a generally reliable categorization value is due to the fact this represents a multi-step mutation in a very slowly mutating marker. Although not the subject of a research study, the age of the mutation to 9 at DYS568 may have been about 3,000 yrs. ago based on the number of marker value differences of 67-marker STR samples. And the mutation to 20,21 at YCA would have arisen in this same general time period. Persons within the DYS568=9 group who were tested for the marker GATA-A10 had values one or more higher than found in other haplogroup G subgroups. Those from the Ashkenazi cluster had the highest values of 14. Additional results would be needed to determine if these findings are consistent within the DYS568=9 group.

Almost all Z1903+ men have the additional Z724 mutation. Men who are Z1903+ and Z724- comprise only a small group within Z1903 and so far are only Hispanic men. Z1903 and Z724 were identified in 2011 in two samples in the 1000 Genomes Project, one from Utah in the United States and other from Beijing, China. Z1903 is found at chromosome position 15106340 and represents a mutation from A to G. Z724 is found at position 6895545 and represents a mutation from C to T The Z-series SNPs were identified by volunteer researchers.

No Z1903 persons have so far been located in the Middle East or Anatolia region where haplogroup G can be unusually common. Several samples, however, have been found among Ossetians in the central Caucasus Mountains and in a sample from Beijing China. Though found all over Europe, Z1903 men are so far missing from Scandinavian samples north of Denmark.

This Z1903/Z724 subgroup contains a further large subgroup consisting of Ashkenazi Jews who are relatively closely related based on STR marker values and typically have a value of 16 for marker DYS385b. The Jewish cluster does not seem to share a common ancestor with the non-Jewish men within the Current Era. And the common ancestor of the Ashkenazi Z1903 men likely lived in the Middle Ages based on the small number of STR marker value difference seen among them. See also page covering Jews with Haplogroup G (Y-DNA).

There is another, smaller subgroup of Z1903 persons who have the value of 9 at STR marker DYS439. The ancestral value for this marker is 12 within the DYS568=9 group, and this 9 represents a rare multi-step mutation. This DYS439=9 subgroup is predominantly German, and the mutation is probably over 2,000 years old based on number of marker value differences in 67-marker STR samples.

The Haplogroup G Project has indicated among its large G collection that likely or proven DYS568=9 samples comprise the following percentages of available G samples in the following countries [in descending order]:

Ireland, 12%.....England, 9%.....Netherlands, 5%.....Poland, 5%.....Italy, 4%.....Germany, 3%.....Spain, 3%.....France, 2%

Within the Z724 subgroup is a subgroup of G-L640+. This is a small group of men presently all from the British Isles. This SNP was identified in summer 2011 at Family Tree DNA. It represents a mutation from A to G and is found at position 16903082 on the Y chromosome. Most, if not all, these L640+ men also have the value of 8 at marker DY533 which is otherwise rare among Z724 men.

=== G-L660+, L662+ ===
This subgroup is a small one, and so far found only in Europeans. Both SNPs involved were first identified at Family Tree DNA in summer 2011. L660 is found at position 12511525 on the Y chromosome and is a change from C to A. L662 is found at position 16446702 and is a change from C to T.

== G-L694+ ==
Persons in this subgroup have the L694 mutation which was discovered at Family Tree DNA in summer 2011. So far, this mutation has been found primarily in Polish men. It is located at position 5734987 on the Y chromosome and is an insertion mutation.

== See also ==
- Genetic genealogy
- Y-DNA haplogroups by ethnic groups
- Haplogroup G (Y-DNA) Country by Country
