= Haplogroup G-M201 =

Human Y chromosome DNA grouping common in western Eurasia

Haplogroup G
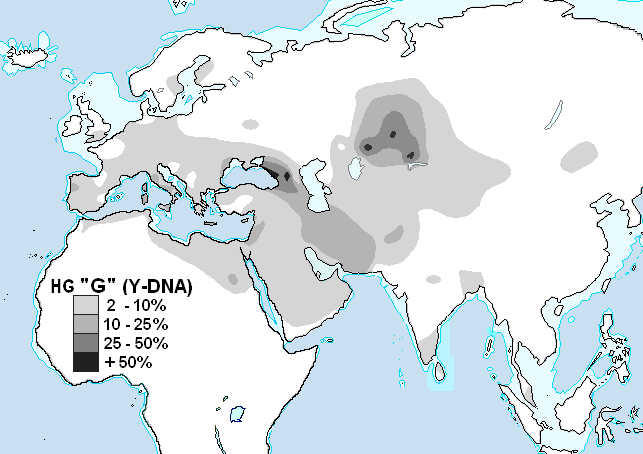
- Possible time of origin: More than 31,100 years BP; 48,500 years before present
- Coalescence age: 30,700-31,100 years before present
- Possible place of origin: West Asia
- Ancestor: Haplogroup GHIJK
- Descendants: primary: G1, G2
- Defining mutations: M201, PF2957, L116, L154, L204, L240, L269, L402, L520, L521, L522, L523, L605, L769, L770, L836, L837, M201, P257/U6, Page94/U17, U2, U3, U7, U12, U20, U21, U23, U33
- Highest frequencies: Ossetians, Circassians (Kabardinians), Georgians, Balkarians, Corsicans, Sardinians, Kalash

Haplogroup G (M201) is a human Y-chromosome haplogroup. It is one of two branches of the parent haplogroup GHIJK, the other being HIJK.

G-M201 is widely thought to have originated in Western Asia. It is now most commonly found among various ethnic groups of the Caucasus, and to a lesser degree the Mediterranean, but is also widely distributed at low frequencies among ethnic groups throughout Europe, West Asia, South Asia, Central Asia, and North Africa.

The most commonly occurring subclades are G1* (M285) and many subclades of G2 (G-P287), especially: G2a (P15), G2a1 (G-FGC7535, formerly G-L293), G2a2b2a (G-P303) formerly G2a3b1); G2a2b1 (G-M406) formerly G2a3a; G2a2b2a1 (G-L140) formerly G2a3b1a; G2a2b2a1a1b (G-L497) formerly G2a3b1a2; G2a2b2a1a1a1 (G-L13) formerly G2a3b1a1a; G2a2b2a1a1c1a (G-CTS5990 or G-Z1903) formerly G2a3b1a3; G2b (G-M3115) and; G2b1 (G-M377), formerly G2b.

== Origins ==
The National Geographic Society placed its origins in the Middle East 30,000 years ago and presumes that people carrying the haplogroup took part in the spread of the Neolithic. Two scholarly papers have also suggested an origin in the Middle East, while differing on the date. Semino et al. (2000) suggested 17,000 years ago. Cinnioglu et al. (2004) suggested the mutation took place only 9,500 years ago.

In line with the highest diversity of basal branches, a paper by Siiri Rootsi et al. suggested that "the geographic origin of haplogroup G plausibly locates somewhere nearby eastern Anatolia, Armenia or western Iran."

== Structure ==
G* (M201)

- G1 (M285, M342)
  - G1a (P20.1, P20.2, P20.3)
    - G1a1 (L201, L202, L203)
  - G1b (L830, L831, L832, L834, L835)
- G2 (P287)
  - G2a (P15, U5, L31/S149, L149)
    - G2a1 (L293^)
      - G2a1a (P16.1, P16.2)
        - G2a1a1 (P18.1, P18.2, P18.3)
    - G2a2 (L223^)
      - G2a2a (M286)
      - G2a2b (L91)
        - G2a2b1 (L166, L167)
    - G2a3 (L30/S126, L32/S148, L190/M485)
      - G2a3a (M406)
        - G2a3a1 (L14/Page57/S130/U16, L90/S133)
        - G2a3a2 (L645)
      - G2a3b (L141.1)
        - G2a3b1 (P303/S135)
          - G2a3b1a (L140)
            - G2a3b1a1 (U1)
              - G2a3b1a1a (L13/S131/U13, L78/M527)
                - G2a3b1a1a1 (L1263^)
              - G2a3b1a1b (L1266^)
                - G2a3b1a1b1 (L1264^, L1265^, L1268^)
            - G2a3b1a2 (L497, L353.1^,L353.2^)
              - G2a3b1a2a (Z725^)
                - G2a3b1a2a1 (L43/S147)
                  - G2a3b1a2a1a (L42/S146)
            - G2a3b1a3 (Z1903^)
              - G2a3b1a3a (Z724^)
                - G2a3b1a3a1 (L640)
            - G2a3b1a4 (L660, L662)
          - G2a3b1b (L694)
        - G2a3b2 (L177.1, L177.2, L177.3)
  - G2b (M377, L72, L183)
    - G2b1 (M283)

(Subclades here conform to the Y-DNA SNP definitions used by ISOGG In 2012, several categories found only in one man in research studies were removed from the ISOGG tree causing some renaming.)

== Geographic distribution ==
=== Prehistoric and ancient presence ===
Ancient G-M201s with sequencing Haplogroup G2a (G-P15) has been identified in Neolithic human remains in Europe dating between 5000 and 3000 BC. These Neolithic Europeans were descendants of Neolithic farmers from Anatolia, among some of the earliest peoples in the world to practice agriculture. G-M201 has also been found in Neolithic Anatolian sites such as Boncuklu dating back to 8300-7600 BCE, and Barcin dating back to 6419-6238 BCE.

Furthermore, the majority of all the male skeletons from the European Neolithic period have so far yielded Y-DNA belonging to this haplogroup. The oldest skeletons confirmed by ancient DNA testing as carrying haplogroup G2a were five found in the Avellaner cave burial site, near Les Planes d'Hostoles, in Catalonia, Spain and were dated by radiocarbon dating to about 5000 BCE.

A skeleton found at the Neolithic cemetery known as Derenburg Meerenstieg II, in Saxony-Anhalt Germany, apparently belonged to G2a3 (G-S126) or a subclade. It was found with burial artifacts belonging to the Linearbandkeramische Kultur ("Linear Band Ceramic Culture"; LBK). This skeleton could not be dated by radiocarbon dating, but other skeletons there were dated to between 5,100 and 6,100 years old. The most detailed SNP mutation identified was S126 (L30), which defines G2a3.

G2a was found also in 20 out of 22 samples of ancient Y-DNA from Treilles, the type-site of a Late Neolithic group of farmers in the Southern France, dated to about 5000 years ago. The fourth site also from the same period is the Ötztal Alps where the mummified remains of Ötzi the Iceman were discovered. The Iceman belongs to haplogroup G2a2b (earlier called G2a4). Haplogroup G2a2b is a rare group today in Europe. The authors of the Spanish study indicated that the Avellaner men had rare marker values in testing of their short tandem repeat (STR) markers.

During the Chalcolithic, haplogroup G was considered ubiquitous in Anatolia, constituting a significant amount of local Y-DNA haplogroups, along with haplogroup J. It remained common throughout the Chalcolithic, Bronze and pre-Roman ages. A 2004 paper found significant correlation between the Hattian and Kaskian cultures, with the presence of haplogroup G, noting however that higher variances of the G2-P15 subclade exist towards western Anatolia.

Substantial amounts of haplogroup G have been discovered in samples ascribed to the Bronze Age Mycenaean Greeks, at an approximate frequency of 25%, as well as members the Minoan civilisation.

=== Modern presence ===
In Russia, Ukraine and Central Asia, members of various ethnic minorities and/or residents in particular localities possess G-M201 at its highest levels in the world – even though the average rate at the national level is about 1% or less. The Turkic Madjar and Argyn tribes (or clans) of Kazakhstan were found to possess the highest levels of G-M201 among any modern ethnic group. Amongst the Madjars, G1 was found at a rate of 87%. A separate study on the Argyns found that 71% of males belong to G1. In the Russian North Caucasus the Kabardinian and Ossetian populations are also notable for high rates of G-M201. Digora, North Ossetia has the highest known concentration of G in a single city, as 74% of the tested men were G. Haplogroup G is found as far east as northern China in small percentages where G can reach more substantial percentages in minority groups such as the Uyghurs.

In Turkey, the South Caucasus and Iran, haplogroup G reaches the highest percentage of national populations. Among Turkish males 11% of the population is G. In Iran, Haplogroup G reaches 13 to 15% of the population in various parts of the country. While it is found in percentages higher than 10% among the Bakhtiari, Talysh people, Gilaki, Mazandarani and Iranian Azeris, it is closer to 5% among the Iranian Arabs and in some large cities. Among the samples in the YHRD database from the southern Caucasus countries, 29% of the samples from Abazinia, 31% from Georgia, 18% from Azerbaijan and 11% from Armenia appear to be G samples.

In Europe west of the Black Sea, Haplogroup G is found at about 5% of the population on average throughout most of the continent. The concentration of G falls below this average in Scandinavia, the westernmost former Soviet republics and Poland, as well as in Iceland and the British Isles. There are seeming pockets of unusual concentrations within Europe. In Wales, a distinctive G2a3b1 type (DYS388=13 and DYS594=11) dominates there and pushes the G percentage of the population higher than in England.

In Corsica, haplogroup G reaches the highest frequency of any European region outside the Caucasus, accounting for 21.7% of all male haplogroups. In a study on the Tirol (Tyrol) region of western Austria, the percentage of G-M201 was found to be 11.3%, although frequencies can reach 40% or more within certain valleys; perhaps the most famous example is the ancient remains of the so-called "Iceman", Ötzi. In the northern and highland areas of the island of Sardinia off western Italy, G percentages reach 11% of the population in one study and reached 21% in the town of Tempio in another study. In the Greek island of Crete, approximately 7% to 11% of males belong to haplogroup G. In north-eastern Croatia, in the town of Osijek, G was found in 14% of the males. The city is on the banks of the river Drava, which notably begins in the Tirol/Tyrol region of the Alps, another haplogroup G focus area in Europe. Farther north, 8% of ethnic Hungarian males and 5.1% of ethnic Bohemian (Czech) males have been found to belong to Haplogroup G.

In South Asia, haplogroup G is rare. Some ethnic minorities possess it at considerable concentrations, including approximately 18% to 20% of Kalash, approximately 16% of Brahui, and approximately 11.5% of sampled Pashtun, all of whom native to the easternmost regions of the Iranian Plateau, while it only appears in about 3% of the general Pakistani population. The relatively high frequency of G2a2 among the Kalash is thought to have arisen due to Iranian or Caucasian influence via the Silk Road. In a study of 936 Indians, haplogroup G made up less than 1% of the sample and was completely absent in the tested north-western Indian population. In one study, about 6% of the samples from Sri Lanka and Malaysia were reported as haplogroup G, but none were found in the other coastal lands of the Indian Ocean or Pacific Ocean in Asia. G-M201 has been described as "almost absent" and "virtually absent" in India, with the G2a-P15 subclade in particular being considered to be negligible, indicating unique dispersal events from Western Asia.

In the Middle East, haplogroup G accounts for about 3% of the population in almost all areas. Among the Druze mostly residents of Israel 10% were found to be haplogroup G.

Around 10% of Jewish males are Haplogroup G.

In Africa, haplogroup G is rarely found in sub-Saharan Africa or south of the horn of Africa among native populations. In Egypt, studies have provided information that pegs the G percentage there to be between 2% and 9%. 3% of North African Berbers were found to be haplogroup G. 2% of Arab Moroccans and 0.8% of Berber Moroccans were likewise found to be G.

In the Americas, the percentage of haplogroup G corresponds to the numbers of persons from Old World countries who emigrated. It is not found among Native Americans except where intermarriage with non-native persons has occurred. It has been found in Mexican mestizos.

== G1 (M285 or M342) ==
Almost all haplogroup G1 persons have the value of 12 at short tandem repeat (STR) marker DYS392 and all will have the M285 or M342 SNP mutation which characterizes this group. This value of 12 is uncommon in other G categories other than G1.

subclades of G1a, G1a1, G1b exist.

The highest reported concentration of G1 and its subclades in a single country is in Iran, with next most frequent concentrations in neighboring countries to the west.

There are distinctive Ashkenazi Jewish and Kazakh subclades based on STR marker value combinations.

== G2 (P287) ==
Men who belong to this group but are negative for all G2 subclades represent a small number of haplogroup G men. P287 was identified at the University of Arizona and became widely known in late 2007. Its identification caused considerable renaming of G categories.

=== G2a (P15) ===
Haplogroup G men who belong to this group, but are negative for all G2a subclades, are uncommon in Europe but may represent a sizeable group in so far poorly tested areas east of Turkey. P15 was identified at the University of Arizona and became widely known by 2002. Its chromosome location listed as 21653414. G2a was found in medieval remains in a 7th- century CE high-status tomb in Ergolding, Bavaria, Germany, but G2a subclades were not tested.

There are multiple SNPs which so far have the same coverage as P15. They are—with accompanying Y-chromosome locations—U5 (rs2178500), L149 (8486380) and L31 (also called S149) (rs35617575..12538148). Should any man with the P15 mutation test negative (ancestral) for any of these or vice versa, that finding would be the basis of a new G2a category.

=== G2a1 (FGC7535) ===
Haplogroup G2a1 (also known as G-FGC753 and previously as G-L293) and its subclades represent the majority of haplogroup G samples in some parts of the Caucasus Mountains area. They are found only in tiny numbers elsewhere. So far all G2a1 persons have a value of 10 at STR marker DYS392. G2a1a persons also typically have higher values for DYS385b, such as 16, 17 or 18, than seen in most G persons.

The North Ossetians in the mid northern Caucasus area of Russia belong overwhelmingly to the G2a1 subclade based on available samples. The South Ossetians and Svans generally south of North Ossetia have significant number of G2a1 persons, but population percentages have not yet been provided.

The presence of the SNP P18 mutation characterizes G2a1a's only subclade, G2a1a. The reliability of both P16 and P18 in identifying everyone in each of these categories has been questioned and individual components of the SNP have to be examined.

Ashkenazi Jewish G2a1a men with northeastern European ancestry form a distinct cluster based on STR marker values. Men from the Caucasus and men from eastern Europe also form distinctive STR clusters.

=== G2a2a (PF3147) ===
G-PF3147 (previously G-L223 and G-PF3146) is characterized by having the L223 mutation. L223 is found on the Y chromosome at rs810801 and 6405148 with a mutation from C to G. L223 was first identified in samples at 23andMe in 2009 but proved problematic as an individual test, the first successful results being reported at Family Tree DNA in late 2011 under its assigned L223 label. It was then learned that several subclades belong under L223, including:

G-L91 was identified in 2009. Its members include "Ötzi", the so-called Iceman, who died at least 5,000 years BP in the European Alps. G-L91 would seem to encompass a significant proportion of men belonging to G. L91 is found so far in scattered parts of Europe and North Africa and in Armenia. Included within G-L91 are some men with double values for STR marker DYS19, but there are also G2a2 men with this finding who are not L91+. The double 19 value situation is not seen in the G2a1 and G2a3 subclades. The L91 mutation is found at 21327383 and rs35474563 on the Y-chromosome. The forward primer is GTATTGAACTTACAATTCACGTCCC, and the reverse is CTCTCCAAATCGGGTTTCCT. The mutation involves a change from C to T. L223 is found on the Y chromosome at rs13304806.

The G-M286 subclade (M286+) is small compared with G-L91. Samples have been identified in England, Germany, Montenegro (Bosniak), Spain, Cyprus (Greek), Turkey, Armenia, Georgia, Lebanon, Syria and Kuwait. The British samples have inconsistent double values for STR marker DYS19 in many cases. M286 was first identified at Stanford University at chromosome position 21151187, and is a mutation from G to A.

The L293 SNP that characterizes a third subclade was identified in June 2010 at Family Tree DNA. It encompasses a small group of Hispanic men who also so far all have the odd value of 13,21 at the YCA marker. The mutation is found on the Y chromosome at 10595022 and is a change from G to C.

=== G2a2b (L30, PF3267, S126, U8) ===
G-L30 (also G-PF3267, G-S126 or G-U8; G2a2b, previously G2a3) Men who belong to this group but are negative for all its subclades represent a small number today. This haplogroup was found in a Neolithic skeleton from around 5000 BC, in the cemetery of Derenburg Meerenstieg II, Germany, which forms part of the Linear Pottery culture, known in German as Linearbandkeramik (LBK), but was not tested for G2a3 subclades.

=== G2a2b1 (M406) ===
G-M406* (G2a2b1*; previously G2a3a*) and its subclades seem most commonly found in Turkey and the coastal areas of the eastern Mediterranean where it can constitute up to 5% of all makes and 50% of haplogroup G samples. G2a2b1 is more common in southern Europe than northern Europe. In Europe—except in Italy – G2a2b1 constitutes less than 20% of G samples. G2a2b1 so far has seldom surfaced in northern Africa or southern Asia, but represents a small percentage of the G population in the Caucasus Mountains region and in Iran.

A relatively high percentage of G2a2b1 persons have a value of 21 at STR marker DYS390. The DYS391 marker has mostly a value of 10, but sometimes 11, in G2a2b1 persons, and DYS392 is almost always 11. If a sample meets the criteria indicated for these three markers, it is likely the sample is G2a2b1.

=== G2a2b2 (CTS2488) ===
G-CTS2488 or G2a2b2 (also known as G-L141.1; previously G-141 and G2a3b) was identified only in mid-2009 at Family Tree DNA. Almost all L141 men belong to L141 subclades. Samples from persons with British Isles, Sicilian and Turkish ancestry have been identified. L141 persons who do not belong to any L141 subclade so far have the value of 11 at STR marker DYS490 — a finding rare in other G categories. The L141 mutation is found on the Y chromosome at 2948607. The L141 mutation involves an insertion.

=== G2a2b2a (G-P303) ===
G-P303*, also known as G2a2b2a* (previously G2a3b1*), and its subclades are now concentrated in southern Russia and the Caucasus, as well as, at lower levels, other parts of Europe and South West Asia, especially an area including Turkey, Iran and the Middle East where G2a2b2a may have originated. G2a2b2a is also found in India.

A majority of members of G-P303 belong to one of its subclades, rather than to G-P303*

The largest G-P303* subclade based on available samples is one in which almost all persons have the value of 13 at STR marker DYS388. The SNP L497 encompasses these men, but most G-L497 men belong to its subclade G-Z725, also known as G-DYS388=13. There are additional subclades of DYS388=13 men characterized by the presence of specific SNPs or uncommon STR marker oddities. Members of this group have been found in Europe and the Middle East.

The next largest subclade of G-P303 is characterized by the presence of the U1 mutation. But a high percentage of U1 men belong to its two subclades, G-L13/S13 and Z1266 (G2a3b1a1b). The G-L13 subclade is most common in north central Europe, and G-Z1266 is most common in the western Caucasus Mountains.

The final major subclade is characterized by presence of the SNP Z1903 and by a value of 9 at marker DYS568. A high percentage of G-Z1903 men belong to its subclade, G-Z724.

The highest percentage of G-P303 persons in a discrete population so far described is on the island of Ibiza off the eastern Spanish coast. This group has been linked with the Crypto-Jewish population which fled to the island during the time of the Spanish Inquisition, of which a significant portion are identifiable as G-Z725 (DYS388=13).

=== G2a2b2b (PF3359) ===
G-PF3359 (or G2a2b2b; previously G2a3b2) was known prior to 2013 as G-L177. The SNP L177 (a.k.a. L1771.1/ L177_1, L1771.2/L177_2, L177.3/L177_3) was withdrawn as an identifier by ISOGG in 2013, after it was "found to be an unreliable palindromic snp".

Ancient DNA identified as G-PF3359 has been found at archaeological sites in: Hungary (the subclade G-F872*), dated at 7,500 years before present (BP); Hungary (subclade G-F1193*) 7,150 BP, and; Spain (G-PF3359*) 4,700 BP.

The members of G-PF3359 are probably smaller in number than men included in G-P303, but only a small amount of testing has occurred for the relevant mutations. So far the men positive for this have had Irish, English, Dutch, Lebanese and/or Turkish (Armenian surname) ancestry. Several G-PF3359 subclades, based on shared STR markers, probably exist.

The number of STR marker values separating men in this group suggest G-PF3359 is a relatively old group despite the small number of men involved. The mutations involved may be complicated and difficult to interpret.

=== G2b1 (M377) ===
G-M377, now also known as G2b1, has previously been designated G2b and G2c. A clade of closely related Ashkenazi Jews represent virtually all G2b persons, with just three other G2b haplotypes having been reported so far: one Turk from Kars in northeast Turkey near Armenia, one Pashtun, and one Burusho in Pakistan.

The extreme rarity of G-M377 in northern Pakistan could indicate that G2b in this area originates outside the region and was brought there in the historic period, perhaps from further west (Pakistan was part of both the Achaemenid Persian Empire, conquered by Alexander the Great, and then formed a part of the Greco-Bactrian Kingdom). These two reported Pakistani G-M377 haplotypes are quite divergent from the Ashkenazi Jewish clade, and therefore do not at all indicate a recent common origin. The Turkish G-M377 is somewhat closer, but not identical. It remains to be seen if testing will reveal G-M377 haplotypes in other populations — this is some indication that G-M377 occurs at low levels in the Near East.

All G-M377 men tested so far also have a rare null value for the DYS425 marker, (a missing "T" allele of the DYS371 palindromic STR), the result of a RecLOH event, a finding not yet seen among most other G haplotypes. Among Jews in Israel drawn from many areas of the world, G-M377 constituted 3.7% in one study.

Haplogroup G-M377 has been found at a frequency of 60% out of a sample of five Pashtuns in the Wardak region of Afghanistan. This is likely due to a local founder effect.

== Defining SNPs ==
The International Society of Genetic Genealogy (ISOGG) maintains the most up-to-date consensus version of haplogroup categories. These classifications are based on shared SNP mutations. The discovery of new SNPs can result in assignment of new names to haplogroup categories. There were only a few G categories until 2008 when major revisions to categories were made. Even more G SNPs were identified in 2009 to 2012 leading to more changes. Until 2008, new G SNPs were reported from labs at the University of Arizona (P designations), Stanford University (M designations) or the University of Central Florida (U designations). Beginning in 2008, additional G SNPs were identified at Family Tree DNA (L designations) and Ethnoancestry (S designations). These latter labs also made use of raw data results reported by individuals tested for about 2,000 SNPs at 23andMe to provide new L or S-designated SNP tests. In 2009–10, Family Tree DNA's Walk through the Y Project, sequencing certain Y-chromosome segments, provided a number of new G SNPs with the L designation. In 2012, SNPs with the Z designation as first identified by citizen researchers from 1000 Genomes Project data began to appear.

Because SNPs provide the most reliable method of categorization, each is allowed to represent an official G category. Categories have alternating letters and numbers. But unusual values or unusual value combinations found at short tandem repeat markers (STRs) can also provide the basis of additional taxonomisation. The identification of a new SNP can necessitate renaming of one or more categories.

The M201 SNP mutation that characterizes haplogroup G was identified at Stanford University and was first reported in 2001. The technical specifications of M201 are given as: refSNPid is rs2032636.....Y chromosome location of 13536923....forward primer is tatgcatttgttgagtatatgtc.....reverse primer is gttctgaatgaaagttcaaacg.....the mutation involves a change from G to T.

A number of SNPs have been identified with seemingly the same coverage in the population as M201. Because M201 was identified first, it is the standard SNP test used when testing for G persons. In order to determine if one of these alternative SNPs represents a subclade of M201, the alternative SNPs must be tested in G persons who are negative for the known subclades of G. There are only a tiny number of persons in such a category, and only a tiny number of persons have been tested for G equivalent SNPs other than M201.

The following SNPs are so far identified as M201 equivalents: L116, L154, L269, L294, L240, P257, L402, L520, L521, L522, L523, L605, Page 94, U2, U3, U6, U7, U12, U17, U20, U21, U23 and U33. P257 was first reported in 2008. L240 was identified in 2009. The "U" SNPs were identified in 2006 but not published until 2009.

In addition, there are multiple other SNPs thought to have the same coverage as M201. These are found at: rs9786910, rs9786537, rs2713254, rs35567891 and rs34621155 on the Y chromosome. No labs have yet assigned them shorthand names.

== Prominent members of G ==
- The man known as "Ötzi" – whose remains, dating from the 4th millennium BCE, were found on the modern border between Austria and Italy – is a member of G-L91 (G2a2b).
- Many members of the so-called Bure kinship, a clan-like group that traces its descent from an individual born in Sweden in the late 14th or early 15th century, reportedly belong to G-Y12970 (also known as G-Y12971 and G-Z30735), also known as G2a2b2a1a1b1a1a2a1c2a~ (according to the 2017 ISOGG tree; previously G2a3b1a2).
- King Richard III of England, who was exhumed in 2012, was a member of G2 (G-P287).
- Joseph Stalin (born Ioseb Besarionis dzе Jugashvili) was, according to a genetic test on one of his grandsons (Alexander Burdonsky), a member of Y-DNA haplogroup G2a1a (FGC595/Z6553).
- Yuya one of Tutankhamun's maternal great-grandfathers. Predicted haplotype G2a, based on ancient Y-STR profiles. Yuya served as a key adviser for Amenhotep III, and held posts such as "King's Lieutenant" and "Master of the Horse"; his title "Father-of-the-god" possibly referred specifically to his being Amenhotep's father-in-law. In his native town of Akhmin, Yuya was a prophet of Min, the chief "god" of the area, and served as this deity's "Superintendent of Cattle".
- Larry Bird is an American professional basketball executive, former coach and former player for the Boston Celtics, has been shown to belong to haplogroup G-Z6748 based on the testing of several relatives descending from Thomas Bird at the Haplogroup G-L497 Y-DNA Project.
- Other males purported to be members of Haplogroup G include: German-American pioneer and soldier Phillip Hamman, Phillips's 5th great-grandson Shane Hamman, a US Olympic weightlifter, US politician Linn Banks, physicist John G. Cramer, American actors James Franciscus and Jake Gyllenhaal, American businessman Najeeb Halaby, US lawyer and administrator Newton Minow and US lawyer and signer of the Declaration of Independence Richard Stockton.

== See also ==
- Jews with Haplogroup G
- Genetic history of Europe
- Genetic genealogy
- Prehistory of Anatolia
- Peoples of the Caucasus
- Magdalenian
- Y-chromosome haplogroups in populations of the world
- Y-DNA haplogroups in populations of Europe
- Y-DNA haplogroups in populations of the Caucasus
- Y-DNA haplogroups in populations of the Near East
- Y-DNA haplogroups in populations of North Africa
- Y-DNA haplogroups by ethnic group

== Sources ==
- Lazaridis, Iosif; Alpaslan-Roodenberg, Songül; Acar, Ayşe; Açıkkol, Ayşen; et al. (2022b). "The genetic history of the Southern Arc: A bridge between West Asia and Europe". Science. 377 (6609) eabm4247. Bibcode:2022Sci...377m4247L. doi:10.1126/science.abm4247. hdl:20.500.12684/12345. ISSN 0036-8075. PMC 10064553. PMID 36007055. S2CID 251843620.
- Skourtanioti, Eirini; Ringbauer, Harald; Gnecchi Ruscone, Guido Alberto; Bianco, Raffaela Angelina; et al. (16 January 2023). "Ancient DNA reveals admixture history and endogamy in the prehistoric Aegean". Nature Ecology and Evolution. 7 (2): 290–303. Bibcode:2023NatEE...7..290S. doi:10.1038/s41559-022-01952-3. ISSN 2397-334X. PMC 9911347. PMID 36646948. S2CID 255941038.
