= Haplogroup G-FGC7535 =

Human Y-chromosome DNA haplogroup

Haplogroup G-FGC7535 (G2a1)
- Possible time of origin: about 3,000 years BC
- Possible place of origin: possibly South Caucasus region
- Ancestor: Haplogroup G2a
- Descendants: G2a1a
- Defining mutations: FGC7535/SK1106/Z6552

Haplogroup G-FGC7535, also known as Haplogroup G2a1 (and formerly G-L293), is a Y-chromosome haplogroup. It is an immediate descendant of G2a (G-P15), which is a primary branch of haplogroup G2 (P287).

G2a1 has an extremely low frequency in almost all populations except parts of the Caucasus Mountains.

In 2017, the SNP L293 was replaced by FGC7535, SK1106 and Z6552 as the defining SNPs of G2a1, due to the technical difficulty in testing for L293.

== Genetic features of haplogroup G2a1 ==
Almost all G2a1 persons have a value of 10 at short tandem repeat (STR) marker DYS392. The major G2a1 subgroup typically has higher values for DYS385b, such as 16, 17 or 18, than seen in most G persons. Almost all G2a1a persons have a value of 15 or more at DYS385a, a finding which can be helpful in distinguishing G2a1a persons from non-G persons with similar marker values. In addition, the G2a1a persons tested were found to have a value of 9 at marker DYS505. This is several values below what is found in G subgroups, and is potentially the basis of additional subgrouping.

L293 which defines G2a1 is a SNP first identified at Family Tree DNA in 2011, and in 2012 was determined to encompass P16 positive persons. L293 is found at chromosome position 10595022 and represents a mutation from G to C. The forward primer is GTCCAGCTCATATGTCTTCAG, and the reverse primer is GACTTTCAACTTCTTACGGCTG. Under usual circumstances subgroup G2a1a persons would also have the distinctive mutation at SNP P16 that characterizes G2a1a. The reliability of P16 in identifying everyone who should be P16+ has been questioned. Because there are two strands involved, P16 results can be reported as P16.1 and P16.2, and persons may have varying results for components of the SNP. The P designation in P16 indicates it was identified at the University of Arizona, and P16's existence was first reported in 2000. These are the specifications listed for P16: located on the Y chromosome at 19434578; 19128376.....forward primer is aggctccatctgtagcacac.....reverse primer is taaccttatagaccaaccccg...the mutation is a change from A to T.

== Dating of G2a1 origin ==
The only published study to date P16 (G2a1a) argues it is about 9,600 years old.

== G2a1 subgroups ==
=== G2a1a (P16) and G2a1a1 (P18) ===
The presence of the SNP P16 mutation characterizes G2a1's only SNP subgroup, G2a1a. But it is difficult to distinguish P16 from its own P18 subgroup. The reliability of P16 in identifying everyone in its G2a1a category has been questioned. As to P18, because individual strands are examined, P18 can be classified as P18.1, P18.2 and P18.3, and persons may have varying results for three components. The P designation indicates it was identified at the University of Arizona, and its existence was first reported in 2002. The technical specifications for P18 are that it is: located on the Y chromosome at 25751219; 25029753; 23396005....forward primer is tggatctgattcacaggtag....reverse primer is ccaacaatatgtcacaatctc.....the mutation is a change from C to T.

=== Other G2a1a genetic clusters ===
Due to the unreliability of the SNP testing for this haplogroup, it can be difficult to validate whether identificable clusters of men belong to G2a1a or instead to G2a1a1. The most common cluster based on STR marker values of G2a1a men who report ancestry in the Caucasus Mountains region has the value of 9 at STR marker DYS391 and 19,21 at marker YCA. Significant other smaller G2a1a Caucasus clusters with 10 or 11 at DYS391 also exist.

The Ashkenazi Jewish G2a1a men with northeastern European origins almost all have YCA values of 21,21 and a DYS19 value of 16. More variation in values is seen in the Caucasus samples than the Ashkenazi samples, suggesting an older common ancestor in the Caucasus than among the Jews.

Other G2a1a men reporting eastern European ancestry form a cluster with YCA values of 19,21 without the other distinctive values seen in the other two clusters.

About half of the available G2a1a/G2a1a1 samples do not reliably belong to any of these three clusters. In addition, the STR markers mentioned are prone to further mutations and are not as reliable as SNPs in identifying all the persons who share a common male ancestor.

Finally, there are lesser numbers of G2a1 men who are negative for P16. It is unclear whether their ancestors may have ever had the P16 mutation. Many of these men have a very unusual 13,21 value for marker YCA and are predominantly Hispanic.

== Geographic distribution ==
G2a1a and its one subgroup represent the majority of haplogroup G samples in some parts of the Caucasus Mountains area. G2a1a is found only in tiny numbers elsewhere. A recent article by Balanovsky et al. provided the first detailed testing of P16 and P18 in this region.

Almost all P16 samples also had the P18 mutation. The highest percentage of P18 was found among Ossetians of Russia's Republic of North Ossetia–Alania, representing 32% of all samples there. Among Abkhazians of Abkhazia, P18 was 16% of total samples, and it was 8% of Circassians (Adyghe) in Russia's Republic of Karachay–Cherkess. Elsewhere in the Caucasus, P16 and P18 were negligible or represented a small percentage. The southeastern Caucasus area was not sampled.

There are isolated samples of G2a1a men with reported ancestry in Georgia, Turkey, Bulgaria, western Russia, Libya, and England with similarities to those of a North Ossetian cluster based on STR marker values. The Svans and South Ossetians within Georgia have significant G2a1a presence though no one has yet quantified the percentage. Likewise closely related to a Jewish cluster based on STR marker values is an anonymous sample in the SMGF database from Kashgar, China, as well as isolated samples from Lebanon, Cyprus, Armenia and the Austrian Tyrol. The mostly eastern European YCA=19,21 subgroup includes an anonymous sample in the SMGF database from Kyrgyzstan, and another sample from among the Svans of Georgia exists.

There are also isolated samples that do not belong to any cluster from the major countries of central, eastern and southern Europe, from Morocco, the northern Middle East, the Caucasus region and Iran. The sample from Iran (Tehran) represents only 1 of the 444 Iranian samples of all types in the YHRD database. Possibly of significance—unlike some other G subgroups—G2a1 samples from southern Asia do not seem to exist. In contrast, among the Romani of Hungary many of the available haplogroup G samples have STR marker features typical of G2a1a.

== Famous members ==
Joseph Stalin, from genetic testing of his grandson (his son Vasily's son; Alexander Burdonsky) belongs to haplogroup G2a1a1. The STR marker value combinations for him are typical of those seen primarily in the Caucasus region. Richard III of England was confirmed just prior to his re-interment to be a member of haplogroup G2 > G-P287, despite the low frequency of this haplogroup in modern Great Britain.

== See also ==
- Genetic Genealogy
- Y-DNA haplogroups in populations of the Caucasus
- Haplogroup G (Y-DNA) by country
