= Haplogroup G (Y-DNA) by country =

Y-chromosome haplogroup

In human genetics, Haplogroup G (M201) is a Y-chromosome haplogroup

None of the sampling done by research studies shown here would qualify as true random sampling, and thus any percentages of haplogroup G provided country by country are only rough approximations of what would be found in the full population.

== Africa ==
=== Algeria ===
In 46 samples taken in Algeria in a 2008 study, 2% were found to be G. SNP testing was not done, but this one sample was predicted G based on haplotype. When originally tested for SNPs, G was not an available test. In a 2011 study, none of 20 samples from Berber Mozabites in Algeria were G.

=== Comoros Islands ===
In a 2011 study of 577 men in the Comoros Islands off the southeastern African coast, 1.8% were G2a (P15+) and 0.3% were in other unspecified G categories, but none were G1.

=== Egypt ===
Of 147 samples from among Egyptians in Egypt (2004), 9% were G. And in a 2009 study, among 116 Egyptians, 6.9% were G. In a study of 35 samples from oasis el-Hayez in the western Egyptian desert area, none were G.

=== Libya ===
A survey of the population of Libya based on testing of SNPs is lacking, but a close approximation for the population in Tripoli in the western part of the country based on the STR markers of 63 samples from there in the YHRD database indicates 7.9% are G using the Athey haplogroup predictor. Of 20 Jews of Libya, 10% were found to be G. These men seemingly were then living in Israel.

=== Morocco ===
In 147 samples taken in Morocco, 1% were found to be G.

In another study 1% of 312 samples in Morocco were G.

Another study gathered samples only from hamlets in Morocco's Azgour Valley, where none of 33 samples were determined G. These hamlets were selected because they were felt to be typically Berber in composition.

A study of 20 Moroccan Jews found 30% were G. The tested men were then apparently living in Israel.

=== South Africa ===
In a 2011 study, in South Africa no G was found among 8 African men. In a 2010 study, no G found in South Africa among 343 southeastern Bantu speakers or 183 Khoe-San speakers, but 5.7% of 157 South African whites were G.

== Anatolia, the Levant and Arabian Peninsula ==
=== Cyprus ===
Among 166 samples from Cyprus, 13.3% were G.

=== Iraq ===
Among 139 samples taken in Iraq in a 2003 study, 2.2% were found to be G. In a 2011 study, 1.4% of 143 Marsh Arabs were found to be G, versus 1.9% of 154 other Iraqis.

A 2004 study sampled 20 Iraqi Jews (apparently living in Israel), and 10% were found to be G2a (P15+). Another study of Iraqi Jews in 2010 found 10.1% of 79 men were G.

=== Israel ===
Among 738 Jews in Israel 9.8% were found to be G. The G2a (P15+) types were in the majority, with G2b (formerly G2c) being the next most common type.

Among the Gnostic Druze, G was found in 4% of 37 samples on the Golan Heights; in 14% of 183 samples in the Galilee; and in 12% of 35 samples in the Carmel. Another study which sampled 20 Druze men apparently living in Israel, none had the G mutation.

Among Palestinians apparently living in Israel, 75% of 20 samples were found to be G2a (P15+). In the same study, among Samaritans in Israel none of 12 samples was G. In the Human Genome Diversity Cell Line Panel (CEPH-HDGP) "Central Israel" Palestinian sample (n=17), 59% (10) were G.

A study of 329 Druze men found 12.5% were haplogroup G. This study was not confined to Israel, but was probably mostly Israeli.

=== Jordan ===
Among 273 samples taken in Jordan, 5.5% were G.

In another study, 5.9% of 101 Jordanian samples at Amman were G, and 0% of 45 samples in the Dead Sea area in Jordan were G.

=== Kuwait ===
In 42 samples taken in Kuwait, 2.4% were G.

In a study confined to Bedouin tribes of Kuwait, among 148 samples 3.4% were G. Most of these were found among the Aniza. All these were G2a (P15+).

=== Lebanon ===
In 916 samples in a 2008 study from Lebanon, 6% were G.

Among 322 samples from Lebanon in a 2010 study, 7.7% were G. Within the religious groups, 7.1% of 195 Catholic Maronites were G, 29.4% of 17 Greek Catholics, 5% of 60 Greek Orthodox, 7.6% of 26 Sunni Muslims, 6.2% of 16 Shiite Muslims and 0% of 9 Druze men.

In 29 samples from a 2008 study among the Druze in Lebanon, none were G in contrast to significant percentages of G among them in Syria and Israel.

=== Oman ===
Of 121 samples taken among Arabs of Oman, 2% were G.

=== Palestine ===
Among 291 samples taken in Palestine 8.9% were G.

=== Qatar ===
In 72 samples taken in Qatar, 2.8% were G. All were G2a (P15+).

=== Saudi Arabia ===
Among 22 samples taken in Saudi Arabia in a 2005 study, 4.5% were G. In another study from 2009, of 157 Saudi samples, 0.64% were G1 and 2.55% G2.

=== Syrian Arab Republic ===
Among 356 samples taken in Syria, 4.8% were G.

In another study of Syria, 5.5% of 200 samples were G. In yet another study, 3.5% of 87 Syrian samples were G.

In another study, among 26 samples taken among the Druze in Syria 14% were G.

=== Turkey ===
Among 523 samples from Turkey in a 2004 study, 9.2% were G. The G1/G1a samples were found only among the northeastern Turkey samples. The single G2b* was found in Kars Province in the far northeast. Of the 9.2% G total, the G samples were found in each of the following subgroups: (a) G2b*(M377+ M283-) n=1; (b) G1* (M342+) n=1; (c) G1a (P20+) n=4; (d) G2a* (P15+) n=37; (e) G2a1 (P16+) n=5; and (f) G2b (M286+) n=1. A 2011 study retested the same samples and found that within those listed G2a* (P15+) men, 10 were G2a3a (M406)

A 2011 study found that in the west central Turkish towns of Foça and İzmir, 3% of 89 samples were G2a3a (M406+) and an additional 4% were unspecified other types of G.

A 2012 study that sampled ethnic Armenians in eastern Turkey found no G1 (M285) among 207 men. But 2% of 104 samples at Sasun were G2a1 (P16) with no P16 found at Lake Van. In contrast, G2a (P15) but not G2a1 was found in 8% of Lake Van and 11% of Sasun men.

Among 87 Kurmanji-speaking Kurds in southeastern Turkey in a 2005 study, 2.3% were found to be G. And among 27 Zazaki-speaking Kurds in the same area, 3.7% were G.

A 2008 doctoral dissertation that sampled 140 men in four towns in central Turkey found 4 of 49 men at "town 1" were G2, 1 of 30 at "town 2", and none of 31 and 30 men respectively at "town 3" and "town 4" were G2. However, the author only applied prediction software to STR samples to determine the haplogroups. He concluded that the genetic diversity found suggests "multiple ancestral populations contributed to the genetic make-up of the area." One G2 man had known origins in northeastern Turkey.

=== United Arab Emirates ===
In 164 samples taken in the United Arab Emirates, 4.2% were G. The majority were of the G1 type.

=== Yemen ===
In 62 samples taken in Yemen, 1.6% were G. All were G2a (P15+).

In another study that concentrated on the island of Soqotra, none of 63 samples was G.

In another study among 20 Jewish Yemenis, 5% were G2a (P15+) and another 5% were G1 (M285+). These men were apparently then living in Israel. A 2010 study of Jewish men found 0% of 74 Jewish men from Yemen were haplogroup G.

== Caucasus Mountains Region ==
=== Armenia ===
Among 100 samples taken in Armenia for a 2003 study, 11% were G. And a 2011 study. found 11% of 57 Armenian samples were G1 and 11% G2a. A 2012 study found that none of 206 Armenian samples were G2a1 (P16), but 2% of 110 men in the Ararat Valley in the west and 1% of 96 men at Gardman in the east were G1 (M285). Much more of G2a (P15) but not G2a1 was found, totalling 9% of the Ararat Valley men and 4.5% of Gardman men.

A 2010 study that concentrated on Jewish men found 21% of 57 Jewish men from Armenia were haplogroup G. Note that Jews in Armenia are mostly recent Ashkenazi and Georgian.

=== Azerbaijan ===
Among 72 samples taken in Azerbaijan 18% were G.

In a study that concentrated on the Talysh of the southern tip of Azerbaijan, 3% of 40 samples were found to be G.

A study that sampled Jews from Azerbaijan found 16% of 57 men were haplogroup G.

=== Georgia ===
Among 61 samples taken in Georgia (2001), 30% were G. Among 77 samples taken in Georgia (2003), 31% were G. Georgia has the highest percentage of G among the general population recorded in any country. Among 66 samples taken in Georgia (2009), 31.6% were G2a (P15+). Of this 31.6% figure, 1.5% were G2a3a (M406+), and the remainder were unspecified other types of G2a.

Most of states worldwide recognize Abkhazia and South Ossetia as part of Georgia. In Abkhazia 55% of 60 samples were found to be G as listed in a 2009 presentation by Khadizhat Dibirova. In a 2011 study, 47% of 162 Abkhazians were found G2a. In South Ossetia 48% of 10 samples were found G2a. G1 was absent from both locations. Another 2011 study found among 58 Abkhazians that 12% were G2a1a (P18), 21% were G2a3b1 (P303) and 24% other G2a (P15)

In a study of Jewish men, 4.8% of 62 Jewish men from Georgia were haplogroup G.

=== Russian Federation (Caucasus Region) ===
North Ossetia	total N	% G-M201	% G2a-P15	% G2a1-P16	% G2a1a-P18	% G2a3b1-P303	source	year
Zil'ga	23	57%	N/A	N/A	N/A	N/A		2004
Zamankul	23	61%	N/A	N/A	N/A	N/A		2004
Alagir	24	75%	N/A	N/A	N/A	N/A		2004
Ardon	28	21%	N/A	N/A	N/A	N/A		2004
Digora	31	74%	N/A	N/A	N/A	N/A		2004
Ossetian	166	68%	N/A	N/A	N/A	N/A		2004
N. Ossetians	132	69%	N/A	N/A	N/A	N/A		2009
Ossets-Iron	230			1%	73%	1%		2011
Ossets-Digor	127			0%	56%	5%		2011

The G concentrations at Alagir and Digora represent the highest reported concentrations of G in any locale in the world. Though not stated in the 2004 studies, most of these were likely typical G2a1a type of G based on corresponding STR marker values.

n.w. Caucasus people	total N	% G-M201	% G2a-P15	% G2a1-P16	% G2a1a-P18	% G2a3b1-P303	source	year
Shapsug	106	81%	N/A	N/A	N/A	N/A		2009
Shapsug	100			0%	0%	86%		2011
Cherkess	126		45%	N/A	N/A	N/A		2011
Karachays	69		32%	N/A	N/A	N/A		2011
Circassians	48	31%	N/A	N/A	N/A	N/A		2009
Circassians	142		1%	0%	9%	30%		2011
Adyghe	155	48%	N/A	N/A	N/A	N/A		2010
Balkars	–		29%	N/A	N/A	N/A		2009
Balkars	135		32%	N/A	N/A	N/A		2011
Kabardin	59		29%	N/A	N/A	N/A		2003

The reported high G concentration among the Shapsugs of the far northwestern Caucasus represents the highest percentage of G among any group worldwide. This is the highest percentage of G in a single population in the world – slightly higher than among the Madjars of Kazakhstan.

n.e. Caucasus people	total N	% G-M201	% G2a-P15	% G2a1-P16	% G2a1a-P18	% G2a3b1-P303	source	year
Lezgins	31		10%	N/A	N/A	N/A		2011
Lezgins	81			1%	1%	0%		2011
Avars	20	5%	N/A	N/A	N/A	N/A		2009
Avars	108	12%	N/A	N/A	N/A	N/A		2009
Avars	42		0%	N/A	N/A	N/A		2011
Avars	115			0%	1%	9%		2011
Chechens-Akkins	20	5%	N/A	N/A	N/A	N/A		2009
Chechens	19	5%	N/A	N/A	N/A	N/A		2003
Chechens	165		2%	N/A	N/A	N/A		2011
Chechen (Chechnya & Ingushetia)	178	6%	N/A	N/A	N/A	N/A		2009
Chechen (Dagestan)	72	4%	N/A	N/A	N/A	N/A		2009
Chechen (Ingushetia)	112			0%	4%	5%		2011
Chechen (Chechnya)	118			0%	0%	1%		2011
Chechen (Dagestan)	100			0%	6%	1%		2011
Ingush	22	27%	N/A	N/A	N/A	N/A		2003
Ingush	142			1%	0%	0%		2011
Dargin	26	4%	N/A	N/A	N/A	N/A		2003
Dargin	86	2%	N/A	N/A	N/A	N/A		2009
Dargin	68		3%	N/A	N/A	N/A		2006
Dargin	101		1%	0%	0%	1%		2011
Kubachi	14	0%	N/A	N/A	N/A	N/A		2009
Kubachi	65		0%	0%	0%	0%		2011
Kubachi	56	0%	N/A	N/A	N/A	N/A		2009
Laks	21	5%	N/A	N/A	N/A	N/A		2009
Tabasarans	30	3%	N/A	N/A	N/A	N/A		2009
Tabasarans	43		0%%	N/A	N/A	N/A		2011
Andi	49		6%	N/A	N/A	N/A		2006
Lezgin	31		58%	N/A	N/A	N/A		2006
Lezgin	90	6%	N/A	N/A	N/A	N/A		2009
Kumyks	76		11%	1%	N/A	N/A		2006
Kumyks	73		14%	N/A	N/A	N/A		2011
Chamalals	27		18%	N/A	N/A	N/A		2011
Terek Cossacks	86	54%	N/A	N/A	N/A	N/A		2009
Kaltagian	30	0%	N/A	N/A	N/A	N/A		2009
Kaitags	33		0%	0%	0%	0%		2011
Kuban Nogays	87		14%	N/A	N/A	N/A		2011
Kara Nogays	76		1%	N/A	N/A	N/A		2011
Bagvalals	28		0%	N/A	N/A	N/A		2011

Note: The study by Yunusbaev (2006) showed the tiny population of Northeast Caucasian language family Andic-speaking Chamalal to be 19% (N=5/27) G2a-P15, and all of this was an unknown sub-clade of G2a-P15 listed as "G2c" (currently classified as G2b) which was not defined in 2006 when this study was conducted (no SNP testing was done for true G2b-M377). Since this study tested only G-M201 and G2a-P15, it is possible that this sub-clade may actually be G2a1-P16, since a number of the likely G haplotypes from Daghestan are actually G2a1-P16. He also reported that 12% (N=76) of the Kumyks tested were G – with that figure composed of 11% G2a (P15+) and 1% (1/76) listed as "G2c", which again at the time a sub-clade of G2a-P15, likely G2a1-P16).

In these Russian tabulations above (1) G2a3a-M406 man among the Avars and (1) G1-M285 man each found among Chechens and Adyghe were omitted to simplify the charts. Also, the 2011 Balanovsky study found 12% G2a3a-M406 among the Lezgins which are not included in the chart entry for them.

== Asia ==
=== Afghanistan ===
In Pashtuns from Afghanistan haplogroup G2b 6.1%.

=== China ===
These percentages of G were found in the following number of samples from China in a 2006 study: (a) The Uyghurs who live primarily in far northwestern China 4.5% of 67. (b) The northern Han 2.3% of 44. (c) The southern Han 0% of 40. (d) Tibet 0% of 105. (e) The Zhuang who live in southern China or Vietnam, 0% of 20. (f) The Yao of southern China 0% of 60. (g) In Manchuria or among the Manchus in northeastern China, 0% of 93. (h) The Evenks who live principally along the border of northeastern China 0% of 31. (i) The Oroqen of northeastern China 0% of 22. (j) The Yi who live principally in southern China and who speak a Burmese language 0% of 43. (k) The Tujia of central China, 0% of 47.

A 2005 study that sampled five southern Chinese groups found the following percentages of G: (1) The Han less than 1% G in 166 samples. (2) The Miao 0% of 58. (3) The She 0% of 51. (4) The Tujia 0% of 49. (5) The Yao 0% of 60.

A 2008 study that concentrated on the island of Hainan off the southeastern Chinese coast found 0% G among 405 men from various island aborigine groups.

A 2007 study that concentrated on the Mang of Yunnan Province in southern China found no G among 65 samples.

Another 2007 study that sampled Tibet found 0% G among 156 samples

A 2010 study of northwestern China found G (M201) in 2% of 41 Kazakhs; 2% of 31 Tajikes; and 2% of 23 Ozbeks. No G was found among Tu, Xibo, Mongolian, Tataer, Uighur, Yugu, Kirghiz, Russ, Dongxiang, Bao'an and Salar persons.

A 2011 study found only a few G samples among hundreds of samples around China of the majority Han population. The Han locales with single G samples were Liaoning in the northeast with one G2b (M377) man, Henan in the east central area with one G2a1 (P16) and Henan again with one G2a (P15) man not M286 or P16. This same study found 2% of Uyghur were G2a (P15) but not M286 or P16. These were all in Xinjiang in the northwest. And among 62 Hui men from Ningxia in the north central area, 1.6% were G1 and 1.6% were G2a (P15) but not P16 or M286. No G at all found among Hui elsewhere or in Tibet (262 samples) or among the Xibe, Hazak, Evenks, Bulang, Wa, Jing, Dai, Zhuang, Dong, Mulao, Buyi, Li, Maonan, Shui, Gelao, Miao, Yao, She, Bai, Hani, Jingpo, Lahu, Lisu Naxi, Yi, Tujia, Hui, Man or Kyrgyz men sampled at various locations.

=== India ===
In 405 samples taken in India in a 2005 study, 1.5% were G. In a 2009 study covering mostly New Delhi and Andhra Pradesh 2% of 104 samples were G.

In another study in 2008 that concentrated on southern Indian locations, less than 1% of 155 samples was G in Tamil Nadu, and the G percentage in Andhra Pradesh was 1% of 167 samples.

A study that sampled 1052 men within 25 diverse populations in India, only one man was G. This man was included in the samples labeled Kash. Pandit.

A 2006 study that sampled 1074 men within 77 diverse Indian populations found only one man in central India who was G.

Another study from 2009 found in 560 samples from northern India that 4% were G. The authors found no G among 96 Bhargavas or 88 Chaturvedis (both Brahmins), but 1.7% of 118 other Brahmins, 9.7% of 154 Shia and 5.8% of 104 Sunni samples were G.

In a 2003 study of 286 men belonging to two tribal groups of Andhra Pradesh in southern India, as well as five caste groups from various parts of India, only one man in West Bengal was G.

In a 2006 study of 728 Indian samples taken from among 36 populations and 18 castes, 1.2% were G. These were all G2a (P15+) men. In this study many of the G2a men were contained within the samples of the Dravidian upper caste where G persons comprised 11.9% of 59 samples.

In a 2010 study sampling 45 Cochin Jews from southern India, none were haplogroup G. The same study found 6.5% of 31 Bene Israel Jews from Mumbai were G.

In the YHRD database, among 44 samples taken among the Afridi Pashtuns in Uttar Pradesh, northern India, 28 (64%) were found to belong to haplogroup G.

In a 2010 study of Muslims in India, in Uttar Pradesh in n. India 2.3% of 129 Indian Sunni men were G as were 8% of 161 Indian Shia there. In Andhra Pradesh in southern India, 8% of 25 Iranian Shia were G. Among the Dawoodi Bohra of west and south India, no G was found in 76 samples, as was the case among Mappla of southern India.

In a 2009 study of 621 samples from various components of the Indian caste system, G was found in 10.9% of 64 Gujarat Brahmins in the west and 3.3% there among 32 Maharashtra Brahmins and none among Gujarat Bhils. In the east, 11.1% of 27 Bihar Paswan were G, but none found among Bihar Brahmins and West Bengal Brahmins. In the central area, no G found among Uttar Pradesh Kols and Gonds, and among Madhya Pradesh Brahmins, Gonds and Saharia. In the north, 3.6% of 49 Punjab Brahmins were G and 2% of 51 J&K Kashmiri Pandists, but none found among J&K Kashmir Gujars or among Uttar Pradesh or Himachal Brahmins.

=== Indonesia ===
In 80 samples taken in Indonesia, 0% were G.

In another study confined to Western New Guinea none of 183 samples were G.

In a study of the northwestern end of the island of New Guinea among 162 samples from 13 populations none were G.

In another study confined to the island of Sumba no G was found among 352 samples.

A study that gathered 552 samples in Bali, 21 in western Indonesia and 55 in eastern Indonesia failed to find any G persons.

=== Iran ===
Of 33 samples taken in northern Iran, 15.2% were G. Of these 5 samples, 4 were G2a (P15+). And 12.8% of 117 samples from the south of that country were G. In this latter location the percentage of G1 almost equaled the G2a percentage. The authors did not provide information about locations sampled.

Of 91 samples taken at unstated location(s) in northern Iran (2009), 2.2% were G.

Of 50 samples taken from the Mazandarani in northern Iran west of the Caspian Sea, 14% were G. Likewise of 50 samples from the Gilaki in the same area, 10% were G.

Of 50 samples taken from the Talysh along the southwestern shore of the Caspian Sea in north central Iran, 2% were G.

Samples were taken in another study in Khuzestan Province of west central Iran, and 15% G found among 53 Bakhtiari in Izeh and 6% G among Arabs in Ahvaz.

In a study of Jewish men, there were no haplogroup G men among 49 men with Iranian origins.

=== Japan ===
In 259 samples taken among the following groups or locations in Japan: Ainu, Aomori, Okinawa, Shizuoka, Tokushima and Kyushu 0% were G.

In another study, among 23 samples taken in Japan, none were G.

=== Kazakhstan ===
Two Kazakh tribes are believed to have the highest levels of Haplogroup G in the world. This is striking partly because most Kazakh males fall into C3.

A study of the Kazakh Madzhars (Madjars) in the Torgay area of Kazakhstan, 86.7% of 45 samples were G. This is the highest concentration of G reported anywhere in the world so far. All the samples were G1.

A limited study has found Haplogroup G-M285 (G1) among four out of five Argyns sampled in central Kazakhstan. The Argyns, who were previously known as the Basmyl, were first documented in the 6th century, residing in what is now the Xinjiang region of China.

=== Korea ===
In 75 samples taken in Korea in a 2006 study, 0% were G. Among another 85 samples also taken in 2006 in Korea, 0% were G. A 2011 study of 64 Korean samples, again found no G among them.

=== Malaysia ===
In 32 samples taken among Malays (presumably from Malaysia), 6.3% were G.

=== Mongolia ===
In 149 samples taken in Mongolia, 0.7% were G. On 47 samples taken also in 2006 in Mongolia, 0% were G.

=== Nepal ===
In 188 samples taken in a 2007 study in 3 locations in Nepal, none were G. Also in Nepal among 173 Tharus in Terai, no G was found in a 2009 study.

=== Pakistan ===
Of 638 samples taken in Pakistan, 2.7% were G. This same study found the percentage of G among 96 samples from Pakistani Pathans was 11.5%; among 44 samples from Kalash men was 18.1% and among 97 samples from Burusho men was 1% – all groups of northern Pakistan.

Among 176 Pakistani samples gathered in another study, G2a (P15+) men represented 4.6% of the total. G1 (M285+) men represented 0.6%, and G2b (M377+) men were 1.1%.

=== Papua New Guinea ===
In a large study of Northern Island Melanesia within Papua New Guinea (2006) none of 685 samples was G. Most of these were Papuan-speaking persons.

In 46 samples taken in Papua New Guinea (2006), 0% were G.

In another study (2008) 19 samples taken on the island of New Britain none were found to be G, and none of 52 samples in the Trobriand Islands were G. In this same study, on the mainland of Papua New Guinea none of 197 samples were listed as G.

=== Russian Federation [Asian portion] ===
In a 2006 study, in Russia among 98 Altai samples, 1% were G. The Altai or Altay are a Turkic group overlapping Mongolia and south central Russia. In this same study among the Buryats, a Mongol people who live principally just north of Mongolia, 1.2% of 81 samples were G, and no G at all was found among 31 samples from the Evens who live principally in the far northeastern area of Russia.

In another 2006 study concentrating on the southern Siberian border region, going from west to east: (a) Of 92 samples from the Turkic Altaian-Kizhi, 1.1% G. (b) Of 47 samples from the Teleuts, 0% G. (c) Of 51 samples from the Turkic Shors 0% G. (d) Of 53 samples from the Turkic Khakassians, 0% G. (e) Of 113 samples from the Mongolized Turkic Tuvinians, 0.9% G. (f) Of 36 samples from the Turkic Todjins, 0% G. (g) Of 53 samples from the Turkic Tofalars, 0% G. (g) Of 34 samples from Sojots, 2.9% G. (h) Of 238 samples from the Mongol Buryats, 0.4% G. Much farther to the north among 50 Evenks, 0% G.

Another 2006 study covered primarily the northeastern area of Siberia where Yakuts and Yakut-speaking Evenks live. The authors did not test for G, but the report suggests the men all belonged instead to the haplogroups shown in the report.

A 2008 study concentrated on two populations of northwestern Siberia. Among 63 Mansi, 4% were G, and among 106 Khanty none were G.

In a small study of 18 Siberian samples, none were G. In a 2011 study of the Altai Republic among 119 samples, 3.4% were G1 and 1.7% were G2a.

=== Sri Lanka ===
In 91 samples taken in Sri Lanka in one study 5.5% were G.

In another study of Sinhalese men, none of 39 samples was G.

=== Taiwan ===
In 132 samples taken in Taiwan, 0% were G.

Among 48 samples taken among Taiwanese aboriginals, none were G.

=== Uzbekistan ===
A study of 15 Jewish men from Uzbekistan found 0% were haplogroup G. This same study, however, referred to a mixture of studies in which 22% of other Uzbek Jewish men samples belonged to haplogroup G.

=== Vietnam ===
In 70 samples taken in Vietnam, 0% were G.

== Europe ==
=== Albania ===
Among 55 samples taken in Albania in a 2009 study, 1.8% were G2a (P15+). None were G2a3a (M406+). In a 2010 study, no G was found among sampled Gabel and Jevg men, but 1.2% of Gheg and 3.3% of Tosk were G (M201+).

=== Austria ===
A survey of the general population of Austria based on testing of SNPs is lacking, but an approximation based on the STR markers of samples from there in the YHRD database indicates 7.0% (n=16) of 230 samples in the Tyrol and none of 66 samples from Vienna and 1.5% (n=1) at Graz are G using the Athey haplogroup predictor. Several additional samples are borderline for being G.

=== Belgium ===
A 2010 study of DNA Project Oud-Hertgodom Brabant found that 3.6% of 893 samples were haplogroup G2a among those with eastern Belgian ancestry. In that same year a study of 477 Brabant men found the following G percentages in these locations: North Brabant 3.1%, Antwerp 2.8%, Campine 2.6%, Mechelen 4.8% and Flemish Brabant 3.7%.

=== Belarus ===
In a 2010 study of men from "Belarus," less than 1% of 196 samples was haplogroup G. A 2005 study had found that 1.5% of 68 Belarusians were G.

=== Bosnia and Herzegovina ===
Among 81 Serbs in Bosnia, 1.2% were found to be G2a (P15+), and among 90 Croats in Bosnia none were G. And in this same study among 84 Bosnians 3.6% were G2a (P15+). In none of these groups was any G2a3a (M406+) found.

In another study among 69 samples in Bosnia, 4.4% were G, and according to Serbian DNA Project in Herzegovina is high point of G2a haplogroup. .

=== Bulgaria ===
In the big sample of 808 Bulgarians of Karachanak 4.6% are G2a

=== Croatia ===
Among 89 samples taken in Croatia in a 2009 study, 1.1% were G2a (P15+). In this same study, 29 samples were taken separately in the far eastern city of Osijek, and 13.8% were G2a (P15+). The G2a samples were also tested for G2a3a (M406), and none was found.

In another study from 2005, among 108 samples from 5 Croatian mainland locations, 0.9% were G.

In yet another study from 2003, among 99 samples on the Croatian mainland, less than 1% were G. On the island of Krk, among 74 samples, none were G; on the island of Brač 6% of 49 samples were G; on the island of Korčula, 10.4% of 134 samples were G; and 1.1% of 91 samples on the island of Hvar were G.

In a 2009 study of Roma Bayash men in Croatia, 10% of 96 men at Baranja in the east were G, but none of 55 men at Medjimurje in the north were G.

=== Czech Republic ===
Among 257 samples from the Czech Republic, 5.1% were G and were overwhelmingly G2a (P15+).

In another study, among 75 samples from Czechs, 4.0% were G2a (P15+). None of these was G2a3a (M406+)

=== Denmark ===
A survey of the general population of Denmark based on testing of SNPs is lacking, but an approximation based on the STR markers of 247 samples from there in the YHRD database indicates 1.2% (n=3) are G using the Athey haplogroup predictor. There are several additional samples that might be G.

=== Estonia ===
A survey of the general population of Estonia based on testing of SNPs is lacking, but an approximation based on the STR markers of 133 samples from Tartu in the YHRD database indicates none are G using the Athey haplogroup predictor. Several additional samples are borderline for being G.

=== Finland ===
A study found 5% of 40 samples from Ostrobothnia in Finland were G.

A survey of the general population of Finland based on testing of SNPs is lacking, but an approximation based on the STR markers of 399 samples from there in the YHRD database indicates 0.5% (n=2) are G using the Athey haplogroup predictor.

=== France ===
In a 2003 study, in 23 samples taken somewhere in France (2003), 0% were G, but 11.8% of 34 samples on the island of Corsica were G. In a 2018 study, haplogroup G was found to account for 21.7% of all males out of a sample of 321, the highest in Europe outside of the Caucasus region.

A 2011 study found that among 51 men in Provence southeastern France, 8% were G with none G2a3a (M406+)

An approximation method based on use of STR markers from 109 samples from Paris in the YHRD database indicates 1.8% (n=2) are G using the Athey haplogroup predictor. And in 99 similar samples from Strasbourg in the far northeast, 4% (n=4) are G.

A 2006 study of the Finistère area at the tip of Brittany in western France, less than 1.2% of men were G and were found only in the port towns.

=== Germany ===
A survey of the general population of Germany based on testing of SNPs is lacking, but an approximation method based on STR markers in samples in the YHRD database using the Athey haplogroup predictor indicates the following G percentages among samples from these German cities: (a) Freiburg in the southwest, 433 samples of which 4.4% (n=19) are G; (b) Munich in the southeast, 281 samples of which 5.3% (n=15) are G; (c) Chemnitz in the northeast. 820 samples of which 3.8% (n=31) are G.

=== Greece ===
In 76 samples taken somewhere in Greece (2003), 2.6% were G. In 77 samples taken somewhere in Greece (2007), 9.1% were G.

In another study (2009) 3.3% of 92 Greek samples were G. This 3.3% was composed of 1.1% G2a3a (M406+) and the remainder other types of G2a.

In a 2011 study, among 57 men at Nea Nikomedeia 4% were G with none G2a3a (M406+) and among 57 at Sesklo/Dimini 4% were G2a3a and additional unspecified G men were 2%. And on the Peloponnese, of 57 men in the area of Lerna/Franchtihi Cave, 4% were G2a3a and 2% other G.

Among 193 samples (2008) taken on the island of Crete, 10.9% were G. Among 57 samples taken on the Peloponnese, 5.3% were G. And at several mainland Greek sites, 4.4% were G.

Another study that focused on Crete (2007), found 7.7% of 104 samples in the central part of the island were G, and that 6.3% of 64 samples on the eastern end were G.

=== Greenland ===
A survey of the general population of Greenland based on testing of SNPs is lacking, but an approximation based on the STR markers of 342 samples from there in the YHRD database indicates none are G using the Athey haplogroup predictor.

=== Hungary ===
In 100 samples taken in Hungary, 3.0% were found to G, and all were G2a (P15+).

In another study, among 53 samples from Hungary, 1.9% were G2a (P15+). None of these were G2a3a (M406+)

In a 2008 study of 215 Hungarians, G2a (P15+) was found in 4%, and found also in 2% of Hungarian Roma. No G1 reported.

=== Iceland ===
A survey of the general population of Iceland based on testing of SNPs is lacking, but an approximation based on the STR markers of 100 samples from there in the YHRD database indicates none are G using the Athey haplogroup predictor.

=== Ireland ===
Among 796 samples taken in all areas of Ireland, none were G. The actual figure in the population is certainly not zero because there are dozens of samples from Irish ancestry persons in various databases.

=== Italy ===
In a large 2007 study of 11 regions of peninsular Italy and Elba, 10.7% of 699 samples were G. The authors did not sample the northwestern Milan area and the high mountains of the central north. The Val Badia samples in the far northeast of Italy had an atypical low 3% of 34 samples. The other areas all ranged 7% to 15% G. Elba had 11% of 95 samples as G.

A 2003 study of Italy had found 11.8% of 51 samples in Sicily; 8.1% of 37 samples in Calabria; 14.1% of 78 samples in Sardinia; and 10% of 50 samples in north central Italy were G.

In another 202 samples taken in Sardinia 13.9% were G. The authors noted the percentage at the sampled sites in the north of the island were 10.4% G, in the central-eastern area 11.1% but only 6.5% in the southwestern area.

And another Sardinian study of 930 males found 12.6% as G. Among a subgroup of these 930 where geographical information was available, the percentage on the southeastern coast was 13.9%; on the northeastern coast 20.9% and 13.9% in the inland central area. This study indicated an unusual percentage of G men there with STR marker value of 23 at DYS390—a percentage not seen in continental Europe where the 23 value is uncommon.

In another Sardinian study confined to towns in the northern sector of the island, 14% of 100 samples were all found to be G2a (P15+) based only on a probability calculation. The G2 category as represented by P15 became G2a in the period in which this study was conducted. The men were predicted just "G2" in the study. But P15 (now G2a) was probably the intended category.

A study that sampled only northeastern Italy found 11.3% G2a (P15+) among 67 samples. None of these were G2a3a (M406+).

A study that focused on the northeastern coast of Italy south of Venice, found among 163 samples that 8.6% were G.

A study that concentrated on 19 upland areas in the Marches region of central Italy found 7.4% G among 162 samples.

A study that concentrated on Sicily found among 236 samples 5.9% were G. This 5.9% figure was divided into 5.5% G2a (P15+) and the remainder other types of G. There were notable high G2a percentages in Caccamo (25% of 16 samples), in Troina (13.3% of 30 samples) and in Sciacca (10.7% of 27 samples).

A 2011 study found 10% of 40 Albanian-speaking Arbëreshë men in Calabria, Italy were G.

=== Kosovo ===
Among 113 samples taken among Albanians in Kosovo, none were G.

=== Latvia ===
A survey of the general population of Latvia based on testing of SNPs is lacking, but an approximation based on the STR markers of 145 samples from Riga in the YHRD database indicates none are definitively G using the Athey haplogroup predictor. Several samples are possibly G.

=== Lithuania ===
A survey of the general population of Lithuania based on testing of SNPs is lacking, but an approximation based on the STR markers of 157 samples from Vilnius in the YHRD database indicates 1.3% (n=2) are G using the Athey haplogroup predictor. One additional sample is borderline for being G.

=== North Macedonia ===
In a general study of North Macedonia, 5.1% of 79 samples were G. This study also found among 57 Romani in North Macedonia none were G. Another study sampled Albanians in North Macedonia, 1.6% of 64 samples were G2a (P15+) but not G2a3a (M406+).

=== Malta ===
In 187 samples taken in Malta, 8% were G.

=== Moldova ===
In 89 samples taken among the Turkic-speaking Gagauzes of southern Moldova 13.5% were G.

=== Netherlands ===
A survey of the general population of the Netherlands based on testing of SNPs is lacking, but an approximation based on the STR markers of 211 samples from there in the YHRD database indicates 4.3% (n=9) are G using the Athey haplogroup predictor.

=== Norway ===
A survey of the general population of Norway based on testing of SNPs is lacking, but an approximation based on the STR markers of 230 samples from there in the YHRD database indicates 1.3% (n=3) are G using the Athey haplogroup predictor. Several additional samples are borderline for being G.

=== Poland ===
Among 99 samples taken in Poland, 0% were found to be G.

Additional information is available in the form of approximations based on the Polish STR-marker samples in the YHRD database. The G samples were identified using the Athey haplogroup predictor. Among 182 samples taken in the general population at Białystok in the northeast, 0.5% (n=1) were G. At this same locale among Belarusians 0.6% (n=1) of 157 samples were G; among 129 Old Believers none were G; among 124 Tatars 0.8% (n=1) were G. In the northwest at Szczecin among 105 samples 1% (n=1) was G. In the south at Kraków among 207 samples, 0.5% (n=1) were G. In the southeast at Lublin among 246 samples, 0.5% (n=1) were G.

=== Portugal ===
In 60 samples taken in northern Portugal in a 2008 study, 12% were found to be G, and 9% of 78 samples in the south of the country were G in a 2008 study.

In a 2004 study, among 109 samples taken in northern Portugal, 7.3% were G. In a 2005 study, 5.5% of 657 Portuguese men at 18 locations were G. The highest percentage was recorded in Évora in the east central area (29 samples), and at the other extreme none found at Viseu (30 samples) and Beja (8 samples), north and south respectively of the other town.

In a 2005 Portuguese study that also included the Atlantic islands, 3.1% of samples in Madeira were G, and 8.3% of 121 samples from the Azores were G. In northern Portugal, 5% of 101 samples were G; in central Portugal 7.8% of 102 samples were G; and 7% of 100 samples in southern Portugal.

In a 2008 study of Portuguese Roma, of 126 men sampled less than 1% was G. In a 2010 study of northeastern Portuguese Jews, 3.5% of 57 men from Trás-os-Montes were G as compared to 3.3% of 30 non-Jewish men from the same area.

=== Romania ===
In 97 samples taken among Hungarian-speaking Szeklers in Transylvania in Romania, 5.2% were found to G, and all were G2a (P15+).

In a more general survey of the Romanian population based on 102 samples of STR markers in the YHRD database 2.0% (n=2) are G using the Athey haplogroup predictor. One additional sample is borderline for being G.

=== Russian Federation [European portion] ===
In a 2008 study, 259 samples taken in three areas in the northernmost third of European Russia (ethnic Russians/Pomors), about 1% were G2a (P15+) and 0% G1. In 246 samples from three areas in the central third of European Russia about 1% were G, with more G1 men than G2a found. In 132 samples from two areas near the border with Latvia and Estonia 0% were G. In 107 samples from Roslavl area near the border with Belarus, 0% were G. In 394 samples from four areas near the border with Ukraine about 1% were G2a and 0% G1. And in 90 samples from among the Kuban Cossacks in the south, 1.1% were G2a and 0% G1.

And in a 2006 study of 414 samples presumably from western Russia (according to a map provided) 1.2% were G. In this same study among 68 Kalmyks (a people of Mongolian origin) who live near the Caspian Sea in the south of western Russia, none were G. In another study of the Kalmyks in the Russian Republic of Kalmykia the authors found 1% G among 99 samples.

Another study in 2008 reported on 545 samples from 12 locations in western Russia. Of these, 1.8% of the samples were G. The highest percentage was 9.5% of 42 samples in Orlovskaja Oblast, east of Belarus and north of Ukraine.

In a study that sampled 116 men of Chuvash origin, 1.7% were haplogroup G.

=== Serbia ===
- Among 113 samples taken in Belgrade, none were G (Peričić et al. 2006).
- Among 179 samples taken, 2.2% were G (Mirabal et al. 2010).

=== Slovenia ===
Among 75 samples taken in Slovenia 2.6% were G. This 2.6% was composed of 1.3% G2a3a (M406+) and 1.3% other types of G2a.

=== Spain ===
Among 24 samples taken in the northeastern corner of Spain in a 2003 study, 8.3% were G. In a larger 2008 study covering about 600 mainland Spanish samples outside the Basque area, the average was about 5% G with the highest percentage recorded in Castilla-La Mancha (10%), and the lowest in parts of Andalusia and Castile (3%).

In a 2004 study, among 258 samples taken in 5 populations in southern Spain, about 3% were G. This same study found in 3 populations in northwestern Spain among 149 samples, about 7% were G, and in the northeastern quarter of Spain in two populations none of 52 samples were G.

Among 221 samples from Basque people in Spain in a 2008 study, 1.4% were G. Of these 168 were living in the three Basque provinces. All were G2a (P15+). Another study found 0% of 116 samples in Basque country were G.

In a 2003 study only of Cantabria just west of the Basque Autonomous Community in northwestern Spain, 7.6% of 118 samples from 3 groupings were G.

A 2009 study of 169 samples from the Pyrenees Mountains in the northeast found almost 2% were G.

A 2009 study only of Andalusia in southern Spain found that 2.1% of Andalusians were G. And of 68 separate samples specifically from the Pedroches Valley (Valle de los Pedroches) in Andalusia 2.9% were G.

In the Balearic Islands 6% of 62 samples in Majorca were G; 0% of 37 samples in Minorca were G, but 13% of 54 samples in Ibiza were G in a 2008 study.

=== Sweden ===
Among 305 samples taken in seven regions of Sweden in a 2006 study, 1.6% were G. The authors also found 0% G in 38 samples from nomadic Saami men of Sweden. In a 2009 study, which totaled 883 Swedish samples, no G was found in the regions of Norrland in the north and Götaland on the southern end. But in the central Svealand area 2.8% of 394 samples were G. If Stockholm is excluded, the percentage increases to 3.7% among 166 samples. While specific Svealand locations were typically 0–1% G, Uppsala on the east central coast showed 12.1% but based on only 33 samples.

=== Switzerland ===
A survey of the general population of Switzerland based on testing of SNPs is lacking, but an approximation based on the STR markers of 348 samples from there in the YHRD database indicates 4.3% (n=15) are G using the Athey haplogroup predictor. An additional sample is borderline for being G.

=== United Kingdom ===
A survey of the general population of the Great Britain for G based on testing of SNPs is lacking, but an approximation based on the STR markers in the YHRD database indicates 3.4% (n=8) of 285 samples from London are G and 1% (n=1) of 97 samples from Birmingham are G using the Athey haplogroup predictor.

=== Ukraine ===
Among 92 samples taken in Ukraine, 3.3% were found G2a (P15+). None of these belonged to G2a3a (M406+).

An approximation of SNP results based on the STR markers of 183 samples from Kyiv in the YHRD database indicates 1.1% (n=2) are G using the Athey haplogroup predictor.

== Australia & Pacific Islands ==
=== Australia ===
Among 33 samples taken among Australian Aborigines of Australia, 0% were G.

=== Cook Islands ===
Among 77 samples taken in the Cook Islands none were G.

=== Fiji Islands ===
Among 105 samples taken in Fiji none were listed as G.

=== Niue ===
Among 9 samples taken in Niue none were G.

=== Philippines ===
In 48 samples taken in the Philippines 0% were G.

=== Samoa ===
Among 61 samples taken in Samoa none were G.

=== Solomon Islands ===
Among 30 samples gathered in the Solomon Islands none were G.

=== Tokelau ===
Among 6 samples taken in Tokelau, none were G.

=== Tonga ===
Among 29 samples taken in Tonga, none were G.

=== Tuvalu ===
Among 100 samples taken in Tuvalu none were G.

=== Wallis and Futuna ===
Among 50 samples taken in East Futuna, none were G.

== North America and the Caribbean ==
=== Cuba ===
Among 245 men sampled in Cuba, 6.1% were G.

=== United States ===
Among 2517 persons in the United States of America from a wide variety of locales, 2.5% were found to be G. When restricted to those with European ancestry the percentage rises to about 4%. African-Americans were about 1% G, and Native Americans 0.3%.

== South America ==
=== Brazil ===
In a study of 48 Apalai men from the Amazon in Brazil none were G.

In a 2015 study, they investigated a set of 41 Y-SNPs in 1217 unrelated males from the five Brazilian geopolitical regions, aiming to disclose the genetic structure of male lineages in the country. Haplogroup G-M201 was found to be 5.1% of this study.

=== French Guiana ===
In a study of 103 men from 4 Native American groups in French Guiana none were G.

=== Peru ===
In a study of 28 Machiguenga men from south inland Peru none were G.

== See also ==
- Genetic genealogy
- Haplogroup G (Y-DNA)
- Haplogroup G1 (Y-DNA)
- Haplogroup G2a3a (Y-DNA)
- Haplogroup G2a3b1 (Y-DNA)
- Haplogroup G2b (Y-DNA)
- Y-chromosome haplogroups in populations of the world
