= Haplogroup G-M377 =

Human Y-chromosome DNA haplogroup

- Possible time of origin: ~8,700 years BP
- Possible place of origin: West Asia
- Ancestor: Haplogroup G2b (M3115)
- Defining mutations: M377, L72
- Highest frequencies: Pashtuns, Sephardic Jews, Ashkenazi Jews, Mizrahi Jews, Palestinians, Lebanese, Syrians

Haplogroup G-M377 is a Y-chromosome haplogroup defined by the presence of the M377 mutation. It is a subclade of Haplogroup G2b-M3115, which in turn is defined by the M3115 mutation.

Haplogroup G-M377 has been observed among Pashtuns, an Iranic ethnic group, and at lower frequencies among all major Jewish groups, including Ashkenazi, Sephardi, and Mizrahi Jews, as well as among Palestinians, Lebanese, and Syrians.

== Origin ==
G presents more mysteries regarding its origin and distribution than virtually any other major Y haplogroup. Haplogroups that are rare in certain regions are more common in another, and have rather clear origins in other places where they are more commonly found. G-M377 has none of these obvious characteristics. Until the Second World War it was most common by far in Eastern Europe, a region where it arrived comparatively recently, but rare in other regions; including its likely area of origin. The distribution of G-M377 is sparse and dispersed, with almost no G-M377 haplotypes found in very large intervening regions. This pattern appears to be unique among Y haplogroups. The extreme rarity of G-M377 in northern Pakistan could indicate that G-M377 in this area originates outside the region and was brought there in the historic period, perhaps from further west (Pakistan was part of both the Achaemenid Persian Empire, conquered by Alexander the Great, and then formed a part of the Greco-Bactrian Kingdom). Pakistani G-M377 haplotypes are quite divergent from the Ashkenazi Jewish clade, and therefore do not at all indicate a recent common origin.

== Phylogenetic position ==
G* (M201)

- G1 (M285, M342)
- G2 (P287)
  - G2a (P15, U5, L31/S149, L149)
  - G2b (M3115)
    - G2b1 (M377)
    - G2b2 (FGC3095)

== Haplogroup characteristics ==
=== Distinguishing Y-STR alleles ===
For the full listing of all the G2b Y-STR modal haplotype values, see the entry:
HRGEN in ySearch.org

All G2b samples tested so far have a null value for the DYS425 marker, (a missing "T" allele of the DYS371 palindromic Y-STR, the result of a RecLOH event. This change is extremely uncommon in the rest of haplogroup G, but apparently happened early in the history of G2b.

G2b Y-STR distinguishing allele values
Y-STR	Allele range	Modals
DYS393	12-13	13
DYS390	23-24	23
DYS19	15-17	15; 17
DYS391	10-12	10; 11
DYS385*	13,15; 13,16; 13,17; 14,16	13,16
DYS426	11
DYS388	12
DYS439	11-12	11
DYS392	11
DYS389	13,29; 13,30; 13,31; 14,31; 14,32; 14,33; 15,33	13,30; 14,31; 14,32
DYS459	8,9
DYS464	13,13,14,15; 13,13,15,15; 13,14,14,15; 13,14,15,15	13,14,15,15
DYS607	15-17	16
DYS395S1a	16,16
DYS425	null
DYS413	21,22
DYS436	11
DYS481	19
DYS461	12

* In haplogroup G2b, according to the Kittler Protocol for DYS385 which tests for the actual order of the DYS385 alleles along the Y chromosome, the smaller allele precedes the larger and therefore the allele sequence given here is physically correct.

=== Primer sequence ===
SNP name	gene	gene location	Y position
M377	DDX3Y	intron 10	15,536,827
		Primer (5'→3')
position (bp)	SNP	forward	reverse	length (bp)
40	A→T	tatgcatttgttgagtatatgtc	gttctgaatgaaagttcaaacg	326

== Distribution ==
=== Ashkenazi Jews ===
A cluster of closely related Ashkenazi Jews represent majority confirmed G-M377 persons worldwide, both from private testing, and from academic studies. Of 211 known European G-M377, 8 are known to have non-Jewish patrilineal ancestors. G-M377 makes up about 7% of all Ashkenazi Jewish Y chromosome haplotypes, as was found in Behar et al. (2004) (n=442, GxG2=33). In the supplemental data from Behar et al. (2004), among the Ashkenazi Jewish G haplotypes 4 and 6-15 are G-M377, 2,3,5 are G-M285, and the haplogroup of the first listed is unclear. In a sample of 955 haplogroup G haplotypes, there are 103 Ashkenazi G-M377 and 14 Ashkenazi G-M285. Among Jews in Israel drawn from many areas of the world, G-M377 constituted 3.7% in one study.

- European G2b comparative haplotype table
- G2c SMGF.org haplotype search

=== Western Germany ===
G-M377 is also found among Ashkenazi Jews from Western Germany. Jews were not allowed to reside in most parts of Germany in the 16th and 17th centuries, aside from the Frankfurt Jewish Ghetto. Jews were expelled in 1670 from Vienna and the Archduchy of Austria. After Khmelnytsky's Pogrom in Poland in 1648, there began a migration of Jews from Poland and Lithuania to Western Germany, which accelerated and continued into the 19th century. A significant number of German Jewish G-M377 appear to represent a pre-1640s independent settlement; some however may be the result of a migration from Eastern Europe.

=== Sicily ===
Among Europeans, there are a few significant exceptions to this almost exclusive Ashkenazi Jewish distribution - out of the more than 2,000 known European G-M377, there are 4 Sicilians, including 3 members of one family with a tradition of Jewish patrilineal descent from the 16th century Sicily.

=== Syria and Lebanon ===
There are a few individuals of Syrian and Lebanese descent that also share this haplogroup. These G-M377 haplotypes form a separate cluster that is very different from the Ashkenazi Jewish clade.

=== Eastern Anatolia ===
A confirmed G-M377 Y-STR haplotype found in the literature is haplotype 54 from a study of Anatolian Y chromosomes (n=523) by Cinnioglu et al. (2004) which was found in Eastern Turkey, in the city of Kars, very close to Armenia.

=== Armenia ===
An Armenian from Syunik was found to have basal G-M377*

=== Iran ===
Haplogroup G-M377 was found in 1.6% (1/63) of Azerbaijanis from West Azerbaijan province in Iran in a 2012 study.

=== Afghanistan ===
Study has found that Haplogroup G-M377 reaches 14.7% in Afghan Pashtuns from Baghlan (5/34), 7.5% in Pashtuns from Kunduz (4/53), 2.7% in Tajiks from Badakhshan (1/37) and 3.7% in Tajiks from Balkh (2/54).

=== Pakistan ===
There are just two other confirmed G-M377 samples that have been publicly reported in the academic literature so far, one Pashtun in the Khyber Pakhtunkhwa province of Pakistan and one Burusho in the Hunza Valley in Kashmir. These two G-M377 are Y-STR haplotypes 731 and 794 from Table 3 in the study by Sengupta et al. (2006) of Indian (n=728), Pakistani (n=176), and East Asian (n=175) Y chromosome lineages. Firasat et al. (2007) found 1 G among 97 Burushos, and in Sengupta et al. (2006) the only Burusho G was G-M377, making it likely that this single G is G-M377 as well. The Y Chromosome Haplotype Reference Database has several haplotypes from India and Pakistan that are very likely to be G-M377 .

=== Upcoming studies ===
Two possible G-M377 Y-STR haplotype samples in the literature are from the study of Jewish and non-Jewish Near Eastern Y chromosomes by Nebel et al. (2001) (in the Appendix Table A1), haplotype 51 which was found in 1 Ashkenazi Jew (n=79) and 3 Kurdish Jews (n=99), and haplotype 47 which was found in 1 Iraqi Jew (combined Iraqi Jews n=20 and Syrian Jews n=3). However, recently advancements in haplogroup prediction have determined these haplotypes G-M377. These also belong to what was termed at the time "Haplogroup 2", (F*, G, and I) and within this set of haplogroups these display a Y-STR allele pattern unique to haplogroup G-M377. In this study, G-M377 was found among 3% of Kurdish Jews. Other Y chromosome samples taken from an upcoming study of Sephardi and Near Eastern (Mizrahi) Jews have found only a few GxG2 (in Y chromosome haplogroup G but not in G2) samples. Preliminary indications are that in this study, only a single Turkish Jew matches any of the modal haplotypes for G-M377, however, all of these samples are being tested for M377.

== Comparison of regional haplotypes ==
Population and Location	n	Status	DYS393	DYS390	DYS19	DYS391	DYS385	DYS426	DYS388	DYS439	DYS392	DYS389	DYS438	DYS461 = add 2 to DYSA7.2
Ashkenazi Jews Poland–Lithuania; Western Germany Sicilians	300	confirmed	12; 13	22; 23; 24	15; 16	9; 10; 11	13,15; 13,16; 14,16	11	12	11; 12	11	13,30; 13,31; 13,32; 13,33; 14,31; 14,32; 14,33; 15,33	10	12
Turkey; Kars	1	confirmed	13	23	16	10		11	12	11	11	13,29
Pashtuns	1	confirmed	13	23	16	11	13,16	11	12	11	11	13,30
Pashtuns	6	confirmed	13	23	17	10		11	12	11	11	13,30		12
Burusho; Hunza Valley	1	confirmed	13	23	17	11		11	12	11	11	13,30		12
Greek; Athens	1	unlikely	13	23	16	11	13,16				11	13,31
Syrians	2	unlikely	13	23	16	11	14,16; 14,15				11	13,30
Iranian; Tehran	1	unlikely	13	23	17	10	13,16				11	13,29
Iraqi Jew	1	predicted G2b	13	23	15	11		11	12		11
Armenians; The Ani region Nagorno-Karabakh	5	predicted G2b	13	23	15	10		11	12		11
Kurdish Jews	3	predicted G2b	13	23	15	10		11	12		11

== Time to the Most Recent Common Ancestor (TMRCA) ==
The time to the Most Recent Common Ancestor (TMRCA) for European G-M377, derived by generating a median-joining network of over 25 haplotypes with 67 Y-STRs, yields a date of 955 years from the average birth year of the testees (estimated to be 1950), with a standard deviation of 107 years. The mutation rate used is based on that of family groups with known most recent common ancestors. So far, this TMRCA includes all groups of European G-M377, including it seems from preliminary evidence, the Italians.

This late tMRCA date for all of G-M377 in Europe raises the question of when G-M377 first entered Europe. If G-M377 entered Europe at an earlier period, we would expect to see more divergent haplotypes than are currently observed. The geographically specific distribution of G-M377 in Europe combined with the very late TMRCA raises the question of from where G-M377 could have entered Europe. Also, was the spread of G-M377 in Europe from the Kingdom of Poland to Germany and Italy, from German to Italy and Poland, or Italy northward to both other areas? No one particular region seems to be more divergent than any other, and in fact, there doesn't seem to be any geographically correlated subclades within European G-M377, with samples from each region matching some from other regions more closely than ones from the same region.

== Possible history ==
One very early G-M3115 sample, although it was derived as a negative for the SNP M377, was found in the remains of an individual dating back to 7000 BCE at Wezmeh Cave, a site near Eslamabad-e Gharb in the Kermanshah province in western Iran. Specifically, it belonged to G-Y37100.

=== Sicily ===
It is estimated that Jews made up 6% or more of the population of Sicily in 1492. Historical evidence shows that most Sicilian Jews went eastward to the Ottoman Empire, where Sicilian Jewish congregations existed in Salonika and Constantinople until the late 19th century. However, it is known that many Sicilian Jews first went to Calabria, and then Jews were expelled from Calabria in 1524, and later from the entire Kingdom of Naples in 1540. There was a gradual movement throughout the 16th century of Jews in Italy from south to north, with conditions worsening for Jews in Rome after 1556 and Venice in the 1580s. Many Jews from Venice and the surrounding area migrated to Poland and Lithuania at this time.

In this scenario it may be that there was a direct migration from Sicily or Southern Italy separately to both Western Germany and Poland-Lithuania, but the presence of G2b in Germany may be due to an earlier migration from France or Spain; as the presence of G2b2 ancestors in Germany appears to date from at least the early 1500s.

Jews had lived in Sicily since Roman times. After the Byzantine reconquest of Sicily from the Arian Ostrogoths who were very tolerant of the Jews in 552, conditions worsened dramatically for Jews in Sicily. Under the Byzantine Empire few Jews lived in Sicily because of official persecution. Before 606 the bishop of Palermo ordered the synagogue to be converted into a church. An edict issued by Leo III the Isaurian in 722 which ordered the baptism by force of all Jews in the Empire. After the Muslim conquest of Sicily in 831–902, large numbers of Jews settled on the island. In 972, the Arab merchant Ibn Hawqal mentioned a Jewish Quarter in Palermo, and by 1170, Benjamin of Tudela reported 1500 Jewish households in Palermo and 200 in Messina. In 1149, Roger II forcibly brought the Jewish brocade, damask, and silk weavers of Thebes in Greece to Sicily to establish a silk industry there. This is an example of a late entry into Sicily of non-Iberian, non-Provençal Jews from outside of Western and Central Europe, from a region that has been poorly tested or devoid of Jews in modern times.

The preliminary conclusions from this evidence is that haplogroup G2b is not native to Europe. The very late tMRCA, and the very high ethnic specificity indicate a rather brief presence in Europe, but one that participated in the exponential growth of the Ashkenazi Jewish population in Eastern and Central Europe after the Black Death. The complete lack of G2b in Iberia and also so far among Spanish Jews indicates that G2b didn't come from Spain, or France, since some Spanish Jewish families originated in southern France and migrated to Spain after France expelled the Jews in 1306. This, along with the other evidence, leaves Sicily as the European origin of G2b. We know that Greek and Mizrahi Jews arrived in Sicily as late as 1149, and that primarily most Sicilian Jews settled there during the Arab Emirate of Sicily. This is one way of explaining the very late presence of G2b in Europe, the likely presence of G2b among at least Kurdish Jews, if not other Mizrahi Jews as well.

=== Pashtuns and the Burushos ===
The presence in these areas may be accounted for by several separate theories, each with their own time scale. It does seem very likely that G-M377 originated in the Near East, in Anatolia or Syria, and spread both eastward and westward from there.

One often stated idea is of a direct Israelite ancestry for the Pashtuns as a whole. These stories were disseminated in medieval times for religious reasons, and as part of the competition between the Mughals and the Pashtuns. However, this does not negate a possible Medieval Jewish origin for some of the Pashtun sub-tribes, but this would depend on the frequency of G-M377 among the Pashtuns, since any Jewish genetic admixture in relatively recent times would have been limited in scope.

==== The Silk Road ====
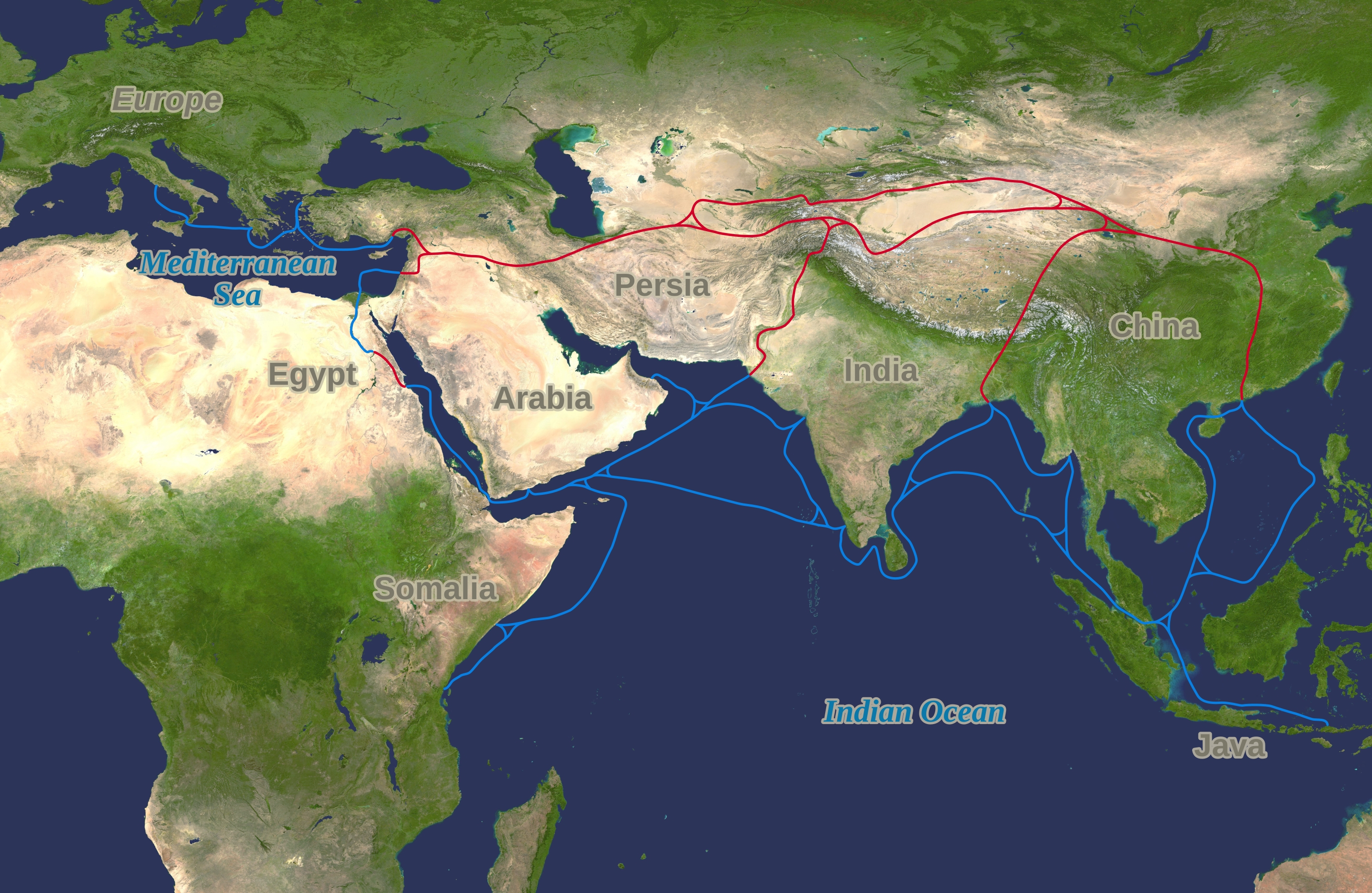
The Medieval Silk Road, which extended from Sicily to Samarkand, the Hunza Valley, and on to Kaifeng, China.

The rarity of G-M377 in northeast Pakistan could indicate that G-M377 in this area originates outside the region and was brought there in the historic period from further west (this area was part of both the Achaemenid Persian Empire, conquered by Alexander the Great, and then formed a part of the Greco-Bactrian Kingdom). These two reported G-M377 haplotypes seem to be quite divergent from both the Ashkenazi Jewish clade and the lone northeastern Anatolian G-M377 based on only 10 Y-STRs, and therefore may not indicate a recent common origin. Another possible route which brought G-M377 to this region is through trade, because Hunza is a fertile valley that was a major stopping point along the southern Silk Road just before the Khunjerab Pass into China.

A Northern Near Eastern / South Caucasian origin for G-M377 is much more likely. The Turkish G-M377 haplotype, and 5 of 6 other almost certain G-M377 Armenian haplotypes have ancestors from a small region in Kars Province of Turkey near the medieval capitals of Armenia. The rarity of G-M377, which is limited to this small area which only became important after the year 884 is most likely due to G-M377 arriving in the region after this time.

Again, the Jewish areas of Kurdistan were not far from this same region. Haplogroup G has its greatest diversity in this same area, where all recorded sub-haplogroups of G have been found, so the evidence seems to point to this region of Eastern Anatolia or south of the Caucasus as the area of origin for all of haplogroup G as well. G-M377 could have spread from this region eastward toward the Hindu Kush and the Karakorum ranges, and southward among the Judeans, and then subsequently westward with the Jewish Diaspora to Italy and then Central and Eastern Europe.

== Famous people in haplogroup G-M377 ==
- John G. Cramer (born 1934), Physicist and author.
- James Franciscus (1934–1991), Leading American film and television actor.
- Newton Minow (born 1926), Former Chairman of the United States Federal Communications Commission (FCC) and Chairman of the Public Broadcasting Service (PBS).

== See also ==
- Haplogroup G (Y-DNA)
- Haplogroup G (Y-DNA) Country by Country
- haplotype
- Y-STR
- archaeogenetics
- genetic genealogy
