= Argyn =

Kazakh clan of the Middle jüz

Арғын
- Tamga used by the Argyn

Regions with significant populations
- Akmola, Karaganda, Kostanay, North Kazakhstan, and Pavlodar Regions

Languages
- Kazakh

Related ethnic groups
- Middle jüz

The Argyn, or Arghin, Arghun (Kazakh: Арғын, romanized: Arğyn), is a Kazakh tribe and a component of the Middle Zhuz (Middle Horde) of the Kazakhs. The most numerous tribe of the Middle Zhuz, which migrated from the Golden Horde to the Timurid Empire during the reign of Abu Sa'id Mirza, the great-grandson of Timur. The Argyns were one of the four most powerful bey clans (karachi-beks) of the Crimean Khanate, who had the authority to confirm the khans on the throne and were members of the Divan (Crimean Khanate state council) of the khanate, significantly influencing the foreign policy of Crimea.

== Origin theories ==
=== Genetics ===
A 2013 study on Argyns' genetics identifies twenty Y-chromosome DNA haplogroups: of these, G1a-P20 constitutes 71% of 2186 samples; R1a*-M198(xM458) 6%, C3c-M48 5%, C3* - M217(xM48) 3%; and other haplogroups represent less than three percent. The authors noted that "Tribe Argyn took on graph an isolated position, demonstrating the absence of genetic links with other Kazakh tribes."

Genetic studies based on Y-chromosome markers of nine Argyn clans have shown that the ancestral gene pool of the Argyns is primarily marked by Y-haplogroup G1, with 67% of Argyns carrying haplotypes belonging to haplogroup G1-M285. Paternally, this lineage traces back to the heritage of peoples from the Indo-Iranian language family. Genetic distance analyses show the closest affinity between Argyns and the peoples of Iran — including Persians, Assyrians, Baloch, Iranis, Mazanderanis, and Kurds.

A combined analysis of Argyn genetics and genealogy has confirmed that the direct ancestor of the tribe was the Golden Horde emir Karakhodzha (14th century), or his immediate ancestors. The study also disproved the hypothesis of András Bíró regarding a genetic relationship between the Madjar clan and the Magyars (Hungarians), as the divergence between the ancestral lines of the Argyns and the Hungarians dates back approximately 20,000 years.

In addition to G1, the Argyns also exhibit the presence of C2 (9%) and R1a1a (7%). The appearance of C2 is associated with Mongol influence, while R1a1a may have two different sources: one marked by M417 and Z2125, found among the Kyrgyz and Pashtuns of Afghanistan (>40%), some populations of Iran and the Caucasus (>10%), and among Kazakhs (~1.5%); the second, marked by M780, is found in South Asia (India, Pakistan, Afghanistan, the Himalayas) and West Asia (Iran), as well as among the Kazakh Sarykopa clan (Babasan sublineage), of likely "Sart" origin.

Genetic data have confirmed a traditional belief that the common ancestor of the Tarakty clan was not the biological son of the Argyn progenitor, but rather an adopted one. As a result, their connection to other Argyns is traced only through the maternal line. The Tarakty clan is characterized by a higher frequency of C2-M217, J1-M267(xP58)**, and R1a1a1b1a1-M458, while the Tobykty clan shows a prevalence of C2-M217 and Q-M242.

Overall, the genetic affinity of the Argyns with the peoples of the Iranian Plateau suggests the presence of an ancient genetic substratum introduced by proto-Argyns through early migrations of Iranian-speaking peoples or their descendants. On the other hand, the similarity with the Kazakhs of the Altai Highlands and the Mongols points to the existence of a later superstratum introduced by migrations of Turkic- and Mongolic-speaking peoples. As a result, by the time the Argyn tribal confederation was fully formed, they had already become a Turkic-speaking group — as was their genealogical founder, Karakhodzha.

=== Argyns and Basmyls ===
A historical bilingual, yet steadily Turkicizing, people, Basmyls, likely contributed to the ethnogenesis of Argyns because both Basmyls and Argyns occupied roughly the same geographic location, in Beiting Protectorate, where Basmyls made their first recorded appearance and which is now in western China, and still home to a Kazakh minority. Kara-Khanid scholar Mahmud al-Kashgari wrote that Basmyls spoke their own language besides Turkic.

"They are handsomer men than the other natives of the country, and having more ability, they come to have authority; and they are also capital merchants." Kashgari mentioned an urban Argu people who spoke Middle Turkic with "a certain slurring (rikka)", like people of Sogdak and Kenchek; Golden proposes that the Arghu were Iranian speakers undergoing Turkicization.

=== Argyns and Mongols ===
According to a number of scholars, the original core of the Argyns traces its origin to Mongol tribes.

One hypothesis holds that the ethnonym "Argyn" or "Argun" comes from Mongolian, meaning "union of ten", and may also be associated with the Argun River in the Buryat region and with the legendary location Ergene-kun. The name of the river Argun (Ergüne, Örgön) translates from Mongolian as "broad" or "wide". G. G. Musabayev traced the word Argyn to the Mongolian arguy ("cattle breeder"). N. A. Aristov linked it to the name of the Argun River (or Argut) in the Altai region. In Mongolian, the suffix "-t" denotes plural, while "-n" indicates singular.

Mukhamedzhan Tynyshpaev believed the Argyns were descended from the Nirun Mongol tribe of the Arikan. According to him, the Argyns were part of the indigenous Mongol population during the 5th–7th centuries CE and lived in what is now Mongolia. Aristov suggested that the Argyns moved westward during the time of Genghis Khan, ahead of the Naimans and Kereits.

Chokan Valikhanov classified the Argyns as a Mongol tribe of the Chagatai Khanate.

Another theory links the Argyns to Arghun Aqa, an Oirat governor who served under the Ilkhanate of Hulagu.

According to Christopher Atwood, the Argyns (or Arguns) descended from conquered steppe peoples of the Mongolian Plateau who were subjugated by the Mongols and brought westward during the Mongol conquests. In his view, the Argyns represented a branch of the Ongut clan that rose to prominence in the Blue Horde of the Jochids, and later formed part of the Kazakh and Moghul populations

In modern Mongolia, surnames such as Argun, Arguud, Arguun, Arguut, Argyn, and Arigan are registered. Among present-day Argyn clans, the Tarakty and Tobykty are genetically closest to the Mongols.

However, as noted by Zhabagin and Sabitov, none of the ethnographic hypotheses regarding the proto-Argyns' origin — whether from Mongolic or Turkic-speaking communities — is fully supported by Y-chromosome polymorphism data. Genetic studies of patrilineal lines show a strong affinity between the Argyns and Iranian-speaking peoples, suggesting an ancient genetic substratum introduced by migration from the Iranian Plateau. In contrast, the Turkic and Mongolic components appear as a superstratum introduced through later waves of migration. The estimated age of the shared G1 cluster among Kazakhs and Mongols is around 3,000 years, indicating that this haplogroup was already present in the Eurasian Steppe during the Early Iron Age.

Genetic studies have shown that the main haplogroup among the Argyns is G1. Research suggests that haplogroup G1 was already present in the Eurasian steppe during the Early Iron Age (including among the ancestors of modern Kazakhs, Bashkirs, and Mongols). At the same time, according to Zhabagin and Sabitov, the predominance of haplogroup G1 indicates a genetic affinity between the Argyns and Iranian-speaking peoples. In their conclusion, none of the ethnographic hypotheses regarding the origin of the Proto-Argyns (from Mongolic-speaking or Turkic-speaking communities) is fully supported by Y-chromosome polymorphism data. The studies point to the existence of an ancient genetic substrate introduced into the Proto-Argyns through migration from the Iranian plateau. Meanwhile, Turkic and Mongolic components, according to these studies, represent a later superstrate introduced by subsequent migrations. The paternal gene pool of the Argyns carries a primary heritage from peoples of the Indo-Iranian language family or their descendants, and only in later stages incorporated additional elements from the gene pools of other Turkic- and Mongolic-speaking populations. According to Zhabagin and Sabitov, by the time the community of Proto-Argyn descendants had taken on a socio-cultural form as a tribal group, they were most likely already a Turkic-speaking group. At the same time, their research indicates that, based on genetic distances, the Argyns are closest to populations of Iran (Assyrians, Baloch, Iranians, Mazanderanis, Kurds), and that the oldest known carrier of haplogroup G1 identified to date was found in western Iran.

== Etymology ==
The name of the Argyns probably corresponds to that of the "Argons" mentioned by Marco Polo in a country called "Tenduc" (around modern-day Hohhot) during the 13th century. Polo reported that this clan who had "sprung from two different races: to wit, of the race of the Idolaters of Tenduc and ... the worshippers of Mahommet.

== Divisions ==
Among the Kazakh Argyn there are two main subdivisions, the Meiram, including 5 clans, and the Momyn, including seven. The Kishhi Argyn (Zhogary Shekty, Tomengi Shekti) and the Zhien are minor subdivisions.

- 5 Meiram:
  - Karakesek
  - Kuandyk
  - Suindik
  - Begendik (Kozgan)
  - Shegendik
- 7 Momyn:
  - Atygai
  - Karaul
  - Basentiyn
  - Kanzhygali
  - Tobykty

== See also ==
- Basmyl
- Madjars
