= Jews with Haplogroup G =

Haplogroup G is found at modest percentages amongst Jewish men within multiple subgroups of haplogroup G (Y-DNA), with the majority falling within the G2b and G2c category. Haplogroups that are more commonly found amongst Jews are Haplogroups T, E and J. Jewish ethnic divisions, ranging from about a fifth of Moroccan Jews to almost none reported among the Indian, Yemenite and Iranian communities.

== Haplogroup G found within Jewish communities ==
The following percentages of haplogroup G persons have been found in the various Jewish communities listed in descending order by percentage of G.

Population	Usual origin	Total N	G %	N=G	Notes
Moroccan Jews	Morocco	83	19.3%	16	
Sephardim (should be clarified that not all Bulgarian and Turkish Jews' paternal lineages derive from Sephardic Jews, and that some of the Moroccan Jewish communities are Sephardic in paternal lineages)	Bulgaria/Turkey	174	16.7%	29	
Mountain Jews	Azerbaijan	57	15.8%	9	
Libyan Jews	Libya	20	10.0%	2	
Iraqi Jews	Iraq	79	10.1%	8	
Ashkenazim	Pale of Settlement/Polish–Lithuanian Commonwealth (NE Europe), Hungary, Czech Republic, Germany, Netherlands	856	7.2%	61	
Bene Israel	Konkan, North India	31	6.5%	2	
Georgian Jews	Georgia	62	4.8%	3	
Yemenite Jews	Yemen	74	6.8%	5	
Persian Jews	Iran	49	0%	0	
Bukharan Jews	Uzbekistan	15	0%	0	
Cochin Jews	Cochin, South India	45	0%	0	
Ethiopian Jews	Gondar, Ethiopia	27	0%	0	

== See also ==
- Genetic genealogy
- Genetic studies on Jews
- Haplogroup G (Y-DNA) Country by Country
