= Svans =

Ethnic subgroup of the Georgians

Svans Svan: შუ̂ანა̈რ shwanær Georgian: სვანები svanebi
- Dadeshkeliani family, 19th c.

Total population
- c. 14,000–80,000

Regions with significant populations
- Georgia: 14,000–30,000

Languages
- Svan, Georgian

Religion
- Predominantly Georgian Orthodox Church

The Svans (Svan: შუ̂ანა̈რ, romanized: shwanær; Georgian: სვანები, romanized: svanebi) are an ethnic subgroup of Georgians indigenous to Svaneti, a region in northwest Georgia. They speak the Svan language and are mostly bilingual also in Georgian. Both these languages belong to the Kartvelian languages. In the pre-1930 Soviet census, the Svans were categorized as a separate ethnic group (natsionalnost), alongside many other ethnic subgroups of Georgians. The self-designation of the Svan is Mushwan, which is probably reflected in the ethnonym Misimian of the Classical authors.

== History ==
The Svans are usually identified with the Soanes mentioned by Greek geographer Strabo, who placed them more or less in the area still occupied by the modern-day Svans.

In the Russian Empire and early Soviet Union Mingrelians and Svans had their own census grouping, but were classified under the broader category of Georgian in the 1930s. They are Georgian Orthodox Christians, and were Christianized in the 4th–6th centuries. However, some remnants of pre-Christian beliefs have been maintained. Saint George (known as Jgëræg to the locals), a patron saint of Georgia, is the most respected saint. The Svans have retained many of their old traditions, including blood revenge, although this tradition has been declining over time and as law enforcement takes hold. Their families are small, and the husband is the head of his family. The Svan strongly respect the older women in families.

== Language ==
Typically bilingual, they use both Georgian and their own, unwritten Svan language. Prior to the 19th century, many Svans were monolingual, only knowing the Svan language.

== Genetics ==
The most common Y-chromosomal haplogroup among the Svans is G2a (90%), in the second place is the Y-chromosomal haplogroup R1a (5%), in the third place is the Y-chromosomal haplogroup J2a1 (about 3%). Among mitochondrial haplogroups H (17.9%), K (15.8%), W6 (13%), T (9.24%), U1 (7.61%), X2 (6, 52%), U2 (5.98%) are common haplogroups.

== Famous Svans ==
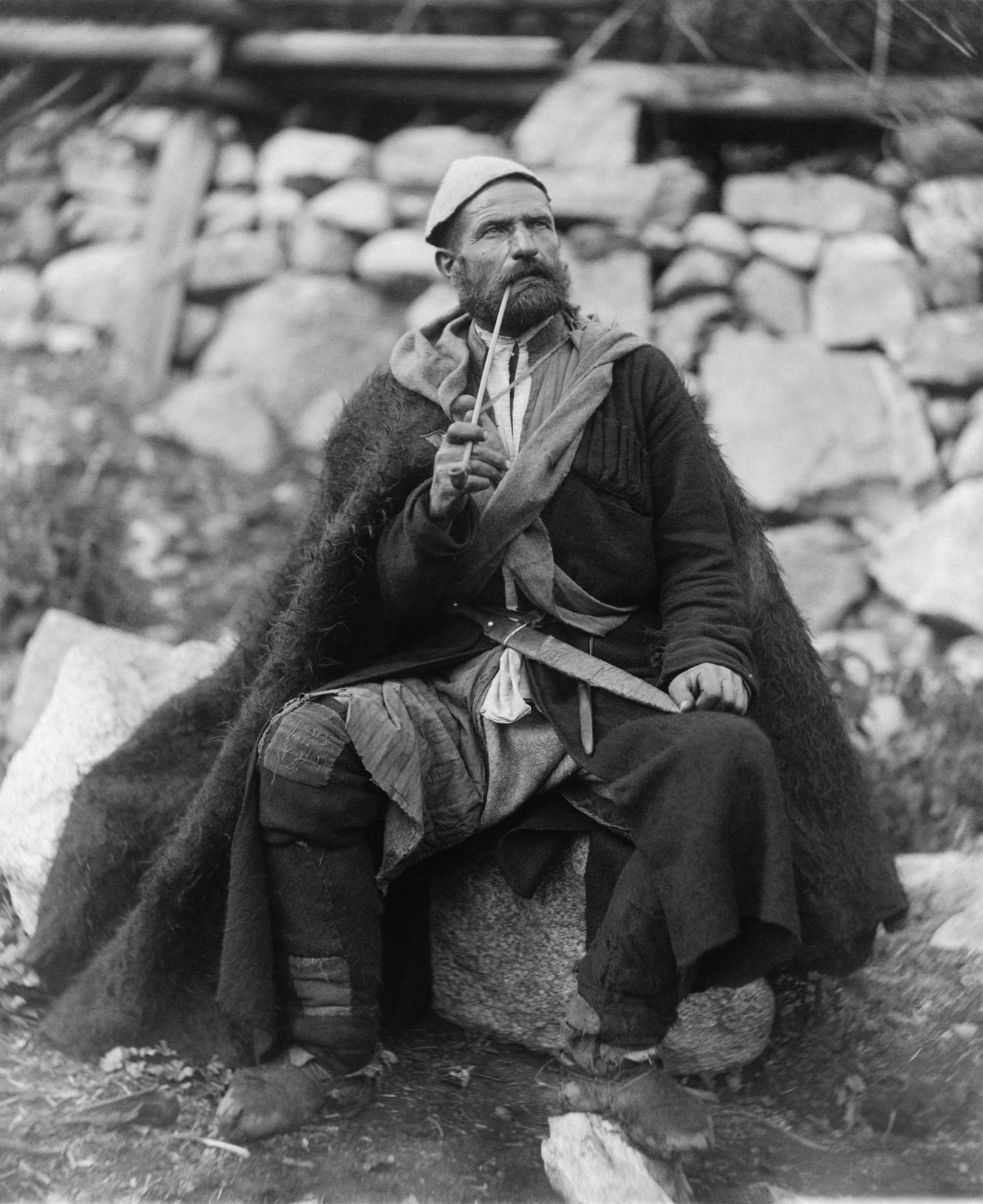
Svan with khanjali (dagger) and long smoking pipe. Mestia (~1888–1900)

- Tevdore (fl. 11th–12th centuries), Georgian religious mural and fresco painter
- Temur Babluani (born 1948), Georgian film director, script writer, and actor
- Géla Babluani (born 1979), Georgian-French film director
- Mikheil Gelovani (1893–1956), Georgian actor
- Otar Ioseliani (1934–2023), Georgian film director
- Mikheil Kurdiani (1954–2010), Georgian philologist, linguist, writer, poet and translator
- Sopho Gelovani (born 1984), Georgian singer
- Tariel Oniani (born 1952), Georgian mafia boss
- Yaroslav Iosseliani (1912–1978), Georgian-Soviet Navy submarine commander
- Nana Ioseliani (born 1962), Georgian chess player
- Otia Ioseliani (1930–2011), Georgian writer
- Tengiz Kitovani (1938–2023), Georgian politician
- Jaba Ioseliani (1926–2003), Georgian politician
- Eteri Liparteliani (born 1999), Georgian judoka
- Varlam Liparteliani (born 1989), Georgian judoka
- Elene Akhvlediani (1898–1975), Georgian painter, artist
