= Madjars =

Turkic ethnic group in Kazakhstan

The Madjars or Madi-yar people are a Turkic ethnic group in Kazakhstan. They number about 1,000–2,000 and live mostly in the Kostanay Region. They are predominantly Muslim.

== Ethnonym ==
Turkologist scholar Dr. Imre Baski claims that the ethnonym Madjar means 'faithful Muslim', literally 'friend or follower of Muhammad', ultimately from Muhammad-i-yar.

"Madi-yar that proved to be a compound anthroponym (Madi[y]-yar) of Arabic-Persian origin. The paper also provides the explanation of the anthroponyms Aldi-yar (’Allah’s friend/follower’) and Ḫudi-yar (’God’s friend/follower’), the “relatives” of Madi(y)-yar (’Muhammad’s friend/follower’)".

While Madjars have been onomastically linked to the Magyars (Hungarians), Imre Baski argues that because it developed from the name Muhammad-i-yar, the Kazakh clan name Madi-yar "cannot possibly be linked to the Magyar ethnonym and thus cannot serve as proof for a relationship between Madiyar and Magyar."

== Genetics ==
Proponents of the view that Madjars are linked to the Magyars (Hungarians) include supporters of "Hungarian Turanism", such as András Zsolt Bíró, who noticed the high frequency of Y-DNA Haplogroup G-M201 among Madiyars and its presence amongst Hungarians. The study concluded that, based on haplogroup frequency, the Madiyars were genetically closer to Hungarians than to their geographic neighbours.

== Bibliography ==
- Nándor Dreisziger. 2011. "Genetic Research and Hungarian 'Deep Ancestry'": p. 3.
- D. Vanek, et al." 2009. "Kinship and Y-Chromosome Analysis of 7th Century Human Remains: Novel DNA Extraction and Typing Procedure for Ancient Material". Croatian Medical Journal, 50:3, pp. 286–95.
