= Macrosatellite =

Repeating segment of DNA (thousands of base pairs)

In genetics, macrosatellites are the largest of the tandem repeats within DNA. Each macrosatellite repeat typically is several thousand base pairs in length, and the entire repeat array often spans hundreds of kilobases. Reduced number of repeats on chromosome 4 (D4Z4 repeats) causes euchromatization of local DNA and is the predominant cause of facioscapulohumeral muscular dystrophy (FSHD). Other macrosatellites are RS447, NBL2 and DXZ4, although RS447 is also commonly referred to as a "megasatellite."

Macrosatellite repeats
Name	Chromosome	Repeat size (kbp)	Repeat number	Encoded genes	Non-coding RNA	Clinical relevance
D4Z4	4, 10	3.3	1-150	DUX4	DBE-T	FSHD
DXZ4	X	3	50-100	None		X-inactivation
RS447	4	4.7	20-103	USP17		
NBL2	13, 14, 15, 21	1.4	Not determined	None	TNBL	cancer
RNU2	17	6.1	5-82	None		
TAF11-Like	5	3.4	10-98	TAF11		possibly schizophrenia
CT47	X	4.8	4-17	CT47		

== See also ==
- Microsatellite
- Minisatellite
- Satellite DNA
