= Forensic biology =

Forensic application of the study of biology

Forensic biology is the application of biological principles and techniques in the investigation of criminal and civil cases.

Forensic biology is primarily concerned with analyzing biological and serological evidence in order to obtain a DNA profile, which aids law enforcement in the identification of potential suspects or unidentified remains. This field encompasses various sub-branches, including forensic anthropology, forensic entomology, forensic odontology, forensic pathology, and forensic toxicology.

== History ==
The first recorded use of forensic procedures dates back to the 7th century when the concept of using fingerprints as a means of identification was first established. By the end of the 7th century, forensic procedures were being used to determine the guilt of criminals.

An early pioneer in criminal identification through biology was Alphonse Bertillon, also known as the "father of criminal identification". In 1879, he introduced a scientific approach to personal identification by developing the science of anthropometry. Anthropometry involves the use of a series of body measurements to distinguish human individuals.

Karl Landsteiner, in 1901, introduced the categorization of human blood into groups: A, B, AB, and O. From this discovery, blood typing, became a fundamental tool in forensic science.

After this, advancements were made which contributed to the ease of using and detecting blood found at crime scenes, expanding the use of blood analysis in forensic biology. Leone Lattes discovered a method to determine the blood group of dried bloodstains in 1915. Subsequently, Albrecht H.O., a German chemist, developed luminol in 1928, which is used to detect trace blood stains at crime scenes.

Alec Jeffreys developed DNA fingerprinting in 1984, which examines variations in DNA that can identify individuals. This has become eminently useful not only in forensic science, but also in resolving paternity and immigration disputes.

In 1983, Kary B. Mullis expanded the use of DNA profiling by developing PCR (polymerase chain reaction), which amplifies DNA segments in-vitro, even in trace amounts. DNA samples found in crimes scenes are often found in minute amounts and degraded states, and sometimes mixed with various body fluids from multiple individuals. Using PCR, these DNA samples can be amplified for analysis when they otherwise would be useless. Beyond forensics, PCR has made an impact on a wide range of fields, including disease diagnosis and virus detection.

== DNA analysis ==
DNA, or deoxyribonucleic acid, is one of the most popular pieces of evidence to recover at a crime scene. Evidence containing DNA is regarded as biological evidence, and is recognized as the "golden standard" in forensic science.

DNA analysis has numerous applications, such as paternity testing, identification of unknown human remains, breakthroughs in cold cases, as well as connecting suspects and/or victims to a piece (or pieces) of evidence, a scene, or another person (either a victim or suspect). Nuclear DNA evidence can be recovered from blood, semen, saliva, epithelial cells and hair (provided the root is still intact). Furthermore, Mitochondrial DNA (mtDNA) can be recovered from the shaft of hair, bone, and the roots of teeth.

To be used, biological evidence must be initially visually recognized at the crime scene. To aid in this, alternative light sources, or an Advanced Light Source (ALS), are used. Once a potential source is identified, presumptive tests are conducted to establish if there is a specified biological presence (semen, saliva, blood, urine, etc.). If positive, samples are collected and submitted for analysis to a laboratory, where confirmatory tests and further tests are performed.

For most forensic DNA samples, STR analysis of autosomal short tandem repeats (STR) is performed in an attempt to individualize the sample to one person with a high degree of statistical confidence. Here, STR markers for autosomal STR are used in forensic DNA typing to track down the missing, verify family connections, and potentially connect suspects to crime sites.

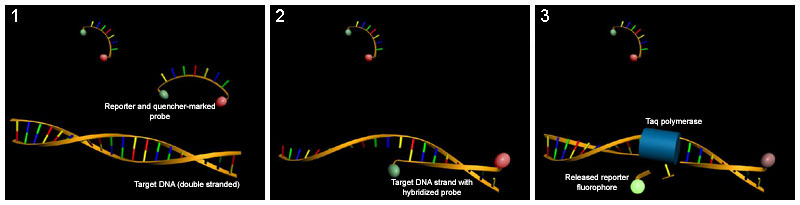
TaqMan Probes

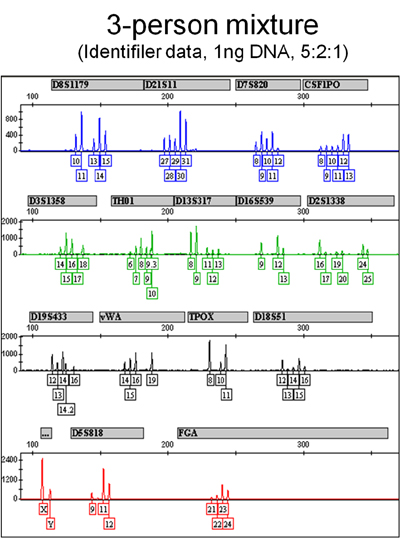
STR electropherogram of a three-person mixture

Laboratory analysis of DNA evidence involves the sample DNA being extracted, quantified, amplified, and visualized. There are several methods of DNA extraction possible including organic (phenol-chloroform) extraction, Chelex extraction, and differential extraction.

Quantitation is commonly conducted using a form of the polymerase chain reaction, known as real-time PCR, quantitative PCR (qPCR). qPCR is the preferred method of DNA quantitation for forensic cases because it is very precise, human-specific, qualitative, and quantitative. This technique analyses changes in fluorescence signals of amplified DNA fragments between each PCR cycle without needing to pause the reaction or open the temperature-sensitive PCR tubes. In addition to the components necessary for a standard PCR reaction (i.e. template DNA, carefully designed forward and reverse primers, DNA polymerase [usually Taq], dNTPs, and a buffer solution containing Mg2+), qPCR reactions involve fluorescent dye-labelled probes that complement and anneal to the DNA sequence of interest that lies between the two primers. A "reporter" (R) dye is attached at the 5' end of the fluorescent probe, while a "quencher" (Q) dye is attached at the 3' end. Before the DNA strands are extended by the polymerase, the reporter and quencher are close enough in space that no fluorescence is detected by the instrument (the quencher completely absorbs/masks the fluorescence of the reporter). As the polymerase begins to extend the strand, the 5' end of the probe is degraded by the polymerase due to its exonuclease activity. The reporter dye is released from the 5' end. It is no longer quenched, thus enabling fluorescence detection. A graph is constructed for the sample DNA comparing the presence of fluorescence (y-axis) to cycle number (x-axis) of the qPCR process. This is then compared to a standard curve of the cycle fluorescence threshold (y-axis) versus the log of known DNA concentrations (x-axis). By comparing the sample data to the standard curve, one may extrapolate the DNA concentration in the sample, which is essential to move forward with PCR amplification and capillary electrophoresis to obtain a DNA profile. DNA profiles are produced as an electropherogram. The obtained profile can be compared to known samples in CODIS to identify a possible suspect. Based on known frequencies of the genotype found in the DNA profile, the DNA analyst may place a statistical measure of confidence on DNA match.

=== Mitochondrial DNA analysis ===
Mitochondrial DNA (mtDNA) is used instead of nuclear DNA when forensic samples have been degraded, are damaged, or are in very small quantities. In many cases, these may be older human remains, sometimes ancient, and the only options for DNA collection are the body's bone, teeth, or hair.

mtDNA can be extracted from degraded samples since its presence in cells is much higher than nuclear DNA. There can be more than 1,000 copies of mtDNA in a cell, while there are only two copies of nuclear DNA. Nuclear DNA is inherited from both the mother and the father but mtDNA is passed down from only the mother to all of her offspring. Due to this type of inheritance, mtDNA is useful for identification purposes in forensic work but can also be used for mass disasters, missing persons cases, complex kinship, and genetic genealogy.

The main advantage of using mtDNA is its high copy number. However, there are a few disadvantages of using mtDNA as opposed to nuclear DNA. Since mtDNA is inherited maternally and passed to each offspring, all members of the maternal familial line will share a haplotype. A haplotype "is a group of alleles in an organism that are inherited together from a single parent". Sharing this haplotype among family members can cause an issue in forensic samples because these samples are often mixtures that contain more than one DNA contributor. The convolution and interpretation of mtDNA mixtures is more difficult than that of nuclear DNA, and some laboratories choose not to attempt the process Since mtDNA does not recombine, the genetic markers are not as diverse as autosomal STRs are in the case of nuclear DNA. Another issue is that of heteroplasmy — when an individual has more than one type of mtDNA in their cells. This can cause an issue in interpreting data from questioned forensic samples and known samples that contain mtDNA. Having adequate knowledge and understanding of heteroplasmy can help ensure successful interpretation.

There are some ways to improve success of mtDNA analysis. Preventing contamination at all testing stages and using positive and negative controls is a priority. In addition, the use of mini-amplicons can be beneficial. When a sample of mtDNA is severely degraded or has been obtained from an ancient source, the use of small amplicons can be used to improve the success of amplification during PCR. In these cases primers amplifying smaller regions of HV1 and HV2 in the control region of mtDNA are used. This process has been referred to as the 'ancient DNA' approach.

The first use of mtDNA as evidence in court was in 1996 in State of Tennessee v. Paul Ware. There was only circumstantial evidence otherwise against Ware so the admittance of mtDNA from hairs found in the victim's throat and at the scene were key to the case.

In 2004, with the help of the National Center for Missing and Exploited Children and ChoicePoint, mtDNA was used to solve a 22-year-old cold case where the nuclear DNA evidence was not originally strong enough. After mtDNA analysis, Arbie Dean Williams was convicted of the murder of 15-year-old Linda Strait, which had occurred in 1982.

In 2012, mtDNA evidence allowed investigators to establish a link in a 36-year-old investigation into the murders of four Michigan children. Hair fibers found on the bodies of two of the children were tested and the mtDNA found to be the same for each sample. For the investigators this was a big break because it meant that the murders were likely connected.

== Disciplines ==
=== Forensic anthropology ===
Anthropology is applied to forensics most regularly through the collection and analysis of human skeletal remains. The primary goals of anthropological involvement include identification and aiding in scene reconstruction by determining details regarding the circumstances of the victim's death. In cases where conventional techniques are unable to determine the identity of the remains due to the lack of soft tissue, anthropologists are required to deduce certain characteristics based on the skeletal remains. Race, sex, age and possible ailments can often be determined through bone measurements and looking for clues throughout the skeletal structure. This becomes necessary when conventional methods that use soft tissue fail to establish the identity of remains.

=== Forensic botany ===
Forensic botany is the application of plant science to legal investigations. It involves the study of plant material, such as leaves, seeds, pollen, and other plant properties, to gather evidence that can aid in criminal or civil proceedings. The identification of plant material is crucial in forensic botany, as it can provide a link between an individual and a crime scene, pinpoint the geographical location of missing bodies, or establish the post-mortem interval (PMI) of a human skeleton.

Forensic botany can also help investigators determine the cause of death in cases where plant toxins are involved. For example, the presence of certain plant species in the stomach contents of a deceased individual may indicate accidental or intentional poisoning.

In addition to identifying plant material, forensic botanists may also analyze soil samples for traces of plant material, which can provide valuable information about the environment in which a crime occurred. The analysis of plant material and soil samples can be performed through various techniques, including optical microscopy, scanning electron microscopy, and DNA analysis.

==== Subspecialties In Forensic Botany ====
Subdisciplines within forensic botany include:

- Forensic palynology (study of pollen and spores). Palynology can produce evidence of decomposition time, location of death or the time of year.
- Bryology (study of bryophytes). Bryology is the easiest to find evidence since bryophyte (a species of plants) attaches to shoes and clothes easily. Bryophytes are useful since even if they are ripped apart or broken down, DNA can still be analyzed.
- Dendrochronology (study of the growth of rings of trees stems and roots)
- Lichenology (study of lichens)
- Mycology (study of fungi)

=== Forensic ornithology ===
Forensic ornithology is the application of scientific techniques to the examination and identification of bird remains for legal purposes. This field of study can aid in investigations related to wildlife crimes, such as poaching, smuggling, and illegal trade of birds and their feathers.

Feathers are one of the most important pieces of evidence used in forensic ornithology. Each bird species has unique feather characteristics that can be observed at both macroscopic and microscopic levels. These characteristics include the size, shape, color, and pattern of the feather, as well as the arrangement and structure of the barbs and barbules. By examining these features, a forensic ornithologist can determine the species of bird to which a feather belongs.

Other types of bird remains can also be identified through forensic ornithology. Bones, for example, can be analyzed to determine the species of bird, as well as the age and sex of the individual. Blood samples can also be used to identify bird species through DNA analysis.

Forensic ornithology can be used in a variety of contexts, including criminal investigations, wildlife management, and conservation efforts. By providing accurate identification of bird remains, this field of study can help to bring perpetrators of wildlife crimes to justice and protect endangered bird species.

=== Forensic odontology ===
Forensic odontology, also known as forensic dentistry, is the application of dental science to legal matters. It is a specialized field that has been instrumental in helping law enforcement detect and solve cases in criminal and civil proceedings.

The use of forensic odontology became more popular in the 1960s with the establishment of the first instructional program in the United States at the Armed Forces Institute of Pathology. Since then, forensic odontology has become widely known by both dental and law enforcement professionals.

Forensic odontologists are dental professionals who use their expertise to establish a person's identity, interpret injuries in the oral and perioral regions, analyze and compare bite marks, and assist forensic pathologists in determining the cause of death if there is a possible contributing dental condition.

Dental evidence is a valuable tool in establishing human identity by comparing the dental features of a deceased person with antemortem dental records. Forensic odontologists can also assist in age estimation in living and deceased persons, which can be useful in cases where the identity of a person is unknown.

=== Forensic pathology ===
Forensic pathology is a specialized field within forensic science that focuses on the examination of individuals who have died suddenly, unexpectedly, or violently to determine the cause and manner of death. A forensic autopsy is a postmortem examination of the body and analysis of bodily fluids to provide information on the cause of death, manner of death, and mechanism of injury.

A forensic pathologist is a medical doctor who has extensive knowledge and expertise in both trauma and disease. They are responsible for performing autopsies and applying their knowledge of the human body and possible internal and external injuries to determine the cause and manner of death. The information obtained from an autopsy can greatly assist investigative efforts and scene reconstruction. A forensic pathologist may also collect evidence from the body, such as trace evidence or biological fluids, that can be used in criminal investigations, and testify in court as expert witnesses regarding their findings.

=== Forensic toxicology ===
Forensic toxicology is an interdisciplinary field that applies principles and methods from toxicology, analytical chemistry, pharmacology, and clinical chemistry to aid in medical or legal investigations of death, poisoning, and drug use. The primary objective of forensic toxicology is the accurate detection, identification, and interpretation of chemicals and their metabolites in biological samples for the purpose of providing objective evidence to support medical or legal decisions. The results of forensic toxicology analyses can be used to determine the cause and manner of death, assess the role of drugs or chemicals in impairment or toxicity, and provide evidence in criminal or civil proceedings. The field of forensic toxicology requires a thorough understanding of the pharmacokinetics and pharmacodynamics of drugs and chemicals, as well as the analytical techniques used to detect and quantify them in biological matrices.

=== Forensic microbiology ===
Forensic microbiology has become an increasingly promising area of research with the recent advances in massive parallel sequencing, also known as next-generation sequencing. This technology has enabled the analysis of microorganisms for various applications in forensic science, including biocrime, bioterrorism and epidemiology.

Microorganisms can serve as valuable sources of evidence in criminal cases, including:

- Clarifying causes of death
  - Drowning
  - Toxicology
  - Hospital-acquired infections
  - Sudden infant death
  - Shaken baby syndrome
- Assisting in human identification through the analysis of
  - Skin flora
  - Hair microbiome
  - Body fluid microbiome
- Geolocation purposes by analyzing
  - Soil microbiome
  - Microbiomes of bodies of water
- Estimation of the post-mortem interval via
  - The thanatomicrobiome, the community of microorganisms that colonize a body after death
  - Epinecrotic microbial communities, the microorganisms that colonize the surface of a decomposing body

By analyzing the stage of decay from bacterial decomposition or the bacterial succession patterns, scientists can estimate the time elapsed since death.

==== Bioterrorism and epidemiology ====
Bioterrorism refers to the deliberate use of biological agents as weapons of warfare. These agents, which can be natural or genetically modified microorganisms, are intentionally disseminated to cause illness, death, or harm to humans, animals, or plants. Regardless of their origin, these biological weapons, which can be viruses, bacteria, or fungi, are highly infectious and pose a significant threat.

Forensic microbiology plays a crucial role in the study of epidemiology. By examining microorganisms obtained from infected individuals, scientists can determine the source of infection, identify the type of infection present, and analyze the mutation pattern of the microorganism. Forensic microbiologists compare the microorganisms isolated from infected individuals to known sources of infectious pathogens to identify the cause of an outbreak.

Biological agents used as weapons are often found in the environment, making it challenging to determine whether an infection is accidental or the result of a deliberate attack. One of the most notable cases of bioterrorism in recent history involved the mailing of at least four anthrax-containing envelopes in the United States in September and October 2001. This incident resulted in 11 people contracting inhalation anthrax, leading to five fatalities, while another 11 individuals were afflicted with cutaneous anthrax. Additionally, 31 persons tested positive for exposure to Bacillus anthracis spores.

However, advancements in PCR and whole-genome sequencing enabled scientists to collaborate with the FBI to identify the source of the letter spores. The combination of forensic microbiology and modern technology is essential in identifying and preventing bioterrorism attacks.

===== Differentiating a biowarfare attack from a normal epidemiology outbreak =====
When investigating a possible bioterrorist or biowarfare attack, the epidemiologic approach is unique from a typical epidemiologic investigation. The process begins by confirming that there has been an outbreak using laboratory and clinical evidence. Once the number of cases and definition of the attack has been established, the outbreak can be characterized by analyzing the time, place, and person affected. This information is critical in identifying the source of the outbreak. By gathering data on cases over time, an epidemic curve can be created. The pattern of the disease is important in distinguishing between a natural outbreak and an intentional attack. In the case of a bioterrorism attack, the source is most likely a single point, with everyone coming into contact with the agent at the same time. Other factors that are investigated to determine if the outbreak is the result of a biological attack include a large epidemic, more severe disease than expected for a given pathogen, an uncommon disease for a specific area, and multiple simultaneous epidemics of different diseases.

==== Post-mortem microbial analysis ====
One of the earliest studies on post-mortem microbial analysis was published by Émile Achard. Post-mortem microbiology is a field that aims to detect unexpected infections causing sudden deaths, confirm clinically suspected but unproven infections, evaluate the efficacy of antimicrobial therapy, identify emergent pathogens, and recognize medical errors. Additionally, the analysis of the thanatomicrobiome may help estimate the post-mortem interval. Currently, extensive research is being conducted to determine if there is a consistent microbial decomposition "clock" that could be used by itself or in conjunction with other techniques, such as forensic entomology, to help estimate postmortem intervals.

One research group has made significant progress in describing such a microbial clock and believes they are within two to five years of testing it in a real crime scene scenario. However, if a reliable and consistent microbial clock is determined to exist, it remains to be seen whether it will pass scientific and legal muster. A judge would also have to determine that the microbial clock meets the standard for admission of expert testimony.

=== Forensic limnology ===
Forensic limnology is the application of limnology, the study of inland waters, to forensic science. In cases involving a body of water at or near the scene of a crime, a sample of the water can be extracted and analyzed to identify the presence and composition of microorganisms, which can act as a form of trace evidence. One such microorganism are diatoms, a type of microalgae that vary in shape and are unique to specific bodies of water. By analyzing the diatom composition in a sample of water, investigators can establish if a person or questioned piece of evidence has been in contact with a specific body of water. This is because diatoms are specific to certain bodies of water, and if a sample contains diatoms found only in a specific body of water, it can be used as evidence to link a person or object to that location. Forensic limnology can be used in conjunction with other forensic techniques to provide a more comprehensive analysis of a crime scene.

=== Forensic entomology ===
Forensic entomology connects entomology to forensic science, applying knowledge of insects to crime scenes. The presence of particular types of insects, in particular life stages, leaving particular traces can all contribute to information on a crime.

== Current issues ==
=== Sexual assault kit backlog ===
As DNA is a critical form of evidence in the investigation of cases of sexual violence, the backlog of untested sexual assault kits (SAKs), also known as a rape kit, greatly affects the successful identification and prosecution of the perpetrators of these crimes. According to RAINN (Rape, Abuse & Incest National Network), the largest anti-sexual violence organization in the United States, the backlog is the result of both a failure of law enforcement to send collected kits to forensic laboratories for analysis, and a lack of resources within these labs to process the kits effectively. In the absence of adequate funding, many districts would rather dedicate their funds to homicides or more high-profile cases, and cases of sexual violence are often swept to the side. With this, as the SAKs remain in storage, the prevalence of the issue increases, especially as more and more kits are being found each year.

=== Cold cases ===
With the considerable advances in DNA analysis, old, open cases with intact evidence can be examined for biological evidence. New profiles are uploaded to CODIS every day so the base population to search and compare to increases. Biological testing for cold cases, specifically homicides, encounters similar roadblocks as the SAKs - lack of funds or the DNA samples have not been properly stored; thus too much degradation has occurred for viable analyses.

== Popular culture ==
In popular culture, forensic biology is frequently portrayed in shows like Law & Order, Hannibal, Bones, CSI, Dexter, Criminal Minds, and Castle. However thanks to Hollywood's depiction of forensic science, the analysis of biological evidence has fallen prey to the CSI Effect, which results in the public's perception of its capabilities being severely distorted and its limits blurred.

== See also ==
- DNA profiling
- Forensic chemistry
- Forensic science
