= Lamprin =

Identifiers
- Symbol: Lamprin
- Pfam: PF06403
- InterPro: IPR009437
Available protein structures:
- PDB: IPR009437 PF06403 (ECOD; PDBsum)
- AlphaFold: IPR009437; PF06403

In molecular biology, the lamprin family of proteins consists of several lamprin proteins from the Sea lamprey Petromyzon marinus. Lamprin, an insoluble non-collagen, non-elastin protein, is the major connective tissue component of the fibrillar extracellular matrix of lamprey annular cartilage.

Although not generally homologous to any other protein, soluble lamprins contain a tandemly repeated peptide sequence (GGLGY), which is present in both silk moth chorion proteins and spider dragline silk. Strong homologies to this repeat sequence are also present in several mammalian and avian elastins. It is thought that these proteins share a structural motif which promotes self-aggregation and fibril formation in proteins through interdigitation of hydrophobic side chains in beta-sheet/beta-turn structures, a motif that has been preserved in recognisable form over several hundred million years of evolution.
