= Tandem repeat locus =

Variable number of tandem repeat locus (VNTR locus) is any DNA sequence that exist in multiple copies strung together in a variety of tandem lengths. The number of repeat copies present at a locus can be visualized by means of a Multi-locus or Multiple Loci VNTR Analysis (MLVA). In short, oligonucleotide primers are developed for each specific tandem repeat locus, followed by PCR and agarose gel electrophoresis. When the length of the repeat and the size of the flanking regions is known, the number of repeats can be calculated. Analysis of multiple loci will result in a genotype.
