= Medical evidence =

Medical evidence can refer to:

- Forensic biology
- Hierarchy of evidence in medical research
