= DXZ4 =

DXZ4 is a macrosatellite found on the X chromosome. Macrosatellites are sequences of DNA with a variable number of tandemly repeated DNA sequences. In humans DXZ4 is composed of 3kb monomers containing a highly conserved CTCF binding site. CTCF is a transcription factor protein and the main insulator responsible for partitioning of chromatin domains in the vertebrate genome.

In addition to being enriched in CpG-islands, DXZ4 transcribes long non-coding RNAs (lncRNAs) and small RNAs of unknown function. Repeat copy number of DXZ4 is highly polymorphic in human populations (varying between 50 and 100 copies). DXZ4 is one of many large tandem repeat loci defined as macrosatellites. Several macrosatellites have been described in humans and share similar features, such as high GC content, large repeat monomers, and high variability for repeat copy number within populations. DXZ4 plays an important role in the unique structural conformation of the inactive X chromosome (Xi) in female somatic cells by acting as a hinge point between two large “super domains”.

In addition to acting as the primary division between domains, DXZ4 forms long-range interactions with a number of other repeat rich regions along the inactive X chromosome. Knockout of the DXZ4 locus revealed loss of this structural conformation on the Xi with chromosome wide silencing being maintained.
