= Multiple loci VNTR analysis =

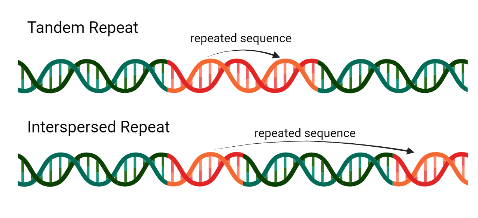
Tandem (top) versus interspersed (bottom) repeated nucleic acid sequence

Multiple loci VNTR analysis (MLVA) is a method employed for the genetic analysis of particular microorganisms, such as pathogenic bacteria, that takes advantage of the polymorphism of tandemly repeated DNA sequences. A "VNTR" is a "variable-number tandem repeat". This method is well known in forensic science since it is the basis of DNA fingerprinting in humans. When applied to bacteria, it contributes to forensic microbiology through which the source of a particular strain might eventually be traced back, making it a useful technique for outbreak surveillance.

In a typical MLVA, a number of well-selected and characterised (in terms of mutation rate and diversity) loci are amplified by polymerase chain reaction (PCR), so that the size of each locus can be measured, usually by electrophoresis of the amplification products together with reference DNA fragments (a so-called DNA size marker). Different electrophoresis equipment can be used depending on the required size estimate accuracy, and the local laboratory set-up, from basic agarose gel electrophoresis up to the more sophisticated and high-throughput capillary electrophoresis devices. From this size estimate, the number of repeat units at each locus can be deduced. The resulting information is a code which can be easily compared to reference databases once the assay has been harmonised and standardised.

MLVA has become a major first line typing tool in a number of pathogens where such an harmonisation could be achieved, including Mycobacterium tuberculosis, Bacillus anthracis, Brucella.

== Some MLVA-associated web sites ==
- https://web.archive.org/web/20141225151444/http://tandemrepeat.u-psud.fr/
- http://minisatellites.u-psud.fr/
- http://mlva.u-psud.fr/
- http://www.mlva.eu/
- http://www.umcutrecht.nl/subsite/MLVA/
- http://miru-vntrplus.org/
- http://www.pasteur.fr/recherche/genopole/PF8/mlva/
- http://mlva.net/
- https://web.archive.org/web/20130927082141/http://microgeno.org/

== Software for analysis of MLVA data ==
- GeneMapper A commercial software for normalisation and size calling of peaks from a certain brand of capillary electrophoresis machines.
- BioNumerics A commercial bioinformatics solution to store and analyze a large panel of biological data, including MLVA, and more generally character datasets. Normalisation, size calling, size correction, assignment of number of repeats and cluster analysis on MLVA data can be performed.
