= Tandem repeat =

Adjacent repeated pattern of nucleotides within DNA

In genetics, tandem repeats occur in DNA when a pattern of one or more nucleotides is repeated and the repetitions are directly adjacent to each other, e.g. ATTCG ATTCG ATTCG, in which the sequence ATTCG is repeated three times.

Several protein domains also form tandem repeats within their amino acid primary structure, such as armadillo repeats. However, in proteins, perfect tandem repeats are rare in naturally occurring proteins, but they have been added to designed proteins.

Tandem repeats constitute about 8% of the human genome. They are implicated in more than 50 lethal human diseases, including amyotrophic lateral sclerosis, Huntington's disease, and several cancers.

== Terminology ==
All tandem repeat arrays are classifiable as satellite DNA, a name originating from the fact that tandem DNA repeats, by nature of repeating the same nucleotide sequences repeatedly, have a unique ratio of the two possible nucleotide base pair combinations, conferring them a specific mass density that allows them to be separated from the rest of the genome with density-based laboratory techniques, thus appearing as "satellite bands". Albeit, a tandem repeat array could not show up as a satellite band if it had a nucleotide composition close to the average of the genome.

When exactly two nucleotides are repeated, it is called a dinucleotide repeat (for example: ACACACAC...). The microsatellite instability in hereditary nonpolyposis colon cancer most commonly affects such regions.

When three nucleotides are repeated, it is called a trinucleotide repeat (for example: CAGCAGCAGCAG...), and abnormalities in such regions can give rise to trinucleotide repeat disorders.

When between 10 and 60 nucleotides are repeated, it is called a minisatellite. Those with fewer are known as microsatellites or short tandem repeats.

When much larger lengths of nucleotides are repeated, on the order of 1,000 nucleotides, it is called a macrosatellite.

When the repeat unit copy number is variable in the population being considered, it is called a variable number tandem repeat (VNTR). MeSH classifies variable number tandem repeats under minisatellites.

== Mechanism ==
Tandem repeats can occur through different mechanisms. For example, slipped strand mispairing, (also known as replication slippage), is a mutation process which occurs during DNA replication. It involves denaturation and displacement of the DNA strands, resulting in mispairing of the complementary bases. Slipped strand mispairing is one explanation for the origin and evolution of repetitive DNA sequences.

Other mechanisms include unequal crossover and gene conversion.

== Uses ==
=== Inheritance signal ===
Tandem repeat describes a pattern that helps determine an individual's inherited traits.

Tandem repeats can be very useful in determining parentage. Short tandem repeats are used for certain genealogical DNA tests. DNA is examined from microsatellites within the chromosomal DNA. Parentage can be determined through the similarity in these regions.

Polymorphic tandem repeats (alias VNTRs) are also present in microorganisms and can be used to trace the origin of an outbreak. The corresponding assay in which a collection of VNTRs is typed to characterize a strain is most often called MLVA (Multiple Loci VNTR Analysis). Using tandem repeat polymorphism, recombination has been reported in the natural transmission of monkeypox (mpox) virus genome during 2022 pandemic.

=== Domesticated living beings ===
Studies in 2004 linked the unusual genetic plasticity of dogs to mutations in tandem repeats.

== Detection and analysis ==
In the field of computer science, tandem repeats in strings (e.g., DNA sequences) can be efficiently detected using suffix trees or suffix arrays.

Tandem repeats can themselves be divided into monomers and higher-order repeats. HORmon was developed for this purpose.

The alignment of tandem repeats using a typical algorithm such as Smith-Waterman tends to give biologically implausible results: these algorithms are unaware of the relatively high frequency of copy number changes at repeat sites and incorrectly penalize them as gaps. A more proper way to align tandem repeats from different individuals is to anchor the alignment on rare substrings.

Nested tandem repeats are described as repeating unit lengths that are variable or unknown and frequently include an asymmetric hierarchy of smaller repeating units. These repeats are constructed from distinct groups of homologous-length monomers. An algorithm known as NTRprism was created by Oxford Nanopore Technologies researchers to enable for the annotation of repetitive structures in built satellite DNA arrays. The algorithm NTRprism is developed to find and display the satellite repeating periodicity.

== Biotechnology ==
Kang. et al. successfully in vitro amplified up to 5kb of a sequence containing 36 identical 99bp tandem repeats and a 561bp sequence with 91% AT content using SHARP, which utilizes engineered superhelicases with enhanced processivity and speed. SHARP combines single-stranded DNA binding protein (SSB) and superhelicases with standard PCR reagents to achieve isothermal amplification that mimics biological DNA replication. The method operates at a constant temperature, eliminating the need for thermal cycling, and has shown particular utility in cases where traditional PCR either fails to amplify target sequences or produces unwanted side products.

== See also ==
- Microsatellite
- Minisatellite
- ProRepeat
- Satellite DNA
- Tandem Repeats Database
- Tandem repeat locus
- Variable number tandem repeats
