= Tandem Repeats Database =

TRDB-

Content
- Description: Tandem repeats

Contact
- Research center: Boston University
- Laboratory: Lab for Biocomputing and Informatics
- Authors: Yevgeniy Gelfand
- Primary citation: Gelfand et al. (2007)
- Release date: 2006

Access
- Website: https://tandem.bu.edu/cgi-bin/trdb/trdb.exe

The Tandem Repeats Database (TRDB) is a database of tandem repeats in genomic DNA.
