= ProRepeat =

Content
- Description: amino acid tandem repeats in proteins.

Contact
- Research center: Wageningen University
- Laboratory: Laboratory of Bioinformatics
- Authors: Hong Luo
- Primary citation: Luo & al. (2012)
- Release date: 2011

Access
- Website: http://prorepeat.bioinformatics.nl/

ProRepeat is a database of protein repeats.

== See also ==
- Tandem repeat
