= Tengiz Beridze =

Georgian biochemist (1939–2024)

- Born: 26 October 1939; Tbilisi, Georgian SSR, USSR
- Died: 2 December 2024 (aged 85)
- Education: Tbilisi State University
- Scientific career
- Fields: Biochemistry, molecular biology
- Doctoral advisor: Norair Sissakian, Serge Durmishidze

Tengiz Beridze (Georgian: თენგიზ გიორგის ძე ბერიძე; 26 October 1939 – 2 December 2024) was a Georgian biochemist.

== Life and career ==
In 1967 Beridze discovered satellite DNA in plants. Through his research from 1972 to 1975, it was found that closely related species of one genus differ in satellite DNA content. In 1986 he published the monograph Satellite DNA in Springer Edition. In 2013 this monograph was edited as an eBOOK. In 2011-17 he established a complete nucleotide sequence of four Georgian grape varieties, nuclear, chloroplast and mitochondria.

In 2015–21 he established a complete chloroplast DNA sequence of Georgian wheat species.

In 1967, he defended his Candidate's Dissertation. In 1980, he defended his doctoral dissertation in the Bakh Institute of Biochemistry, Moscow. He was elected a corresponding member of the Academy of Sciences of Georgia in 1987 and a full member in 1993.

Beridze held various positions in Soviet and Georgian institutions since 1960s.

Beridze died on 3 December 2024, at the age of 85.

== Positions ==
- 1968–2008 – Institute of Biochemistry and Biotechnology, Georgian Academy of Sciences
- 1968–1999 – Professor at Tbilisi State University, Georgia
- 2008–2010 – Professor at Ilia State University, Tbilisi, Georgia
- 2010–2011 – Professor at Free University of Tbilisi, Georgia
- 2012–2021 – Director of Institute of Molecular Genetics, Agricultural University of Georgia
- 2012–20?? – Professor at Agricultural University of Georgia, Tbilisi, Georgia

== Awards ==
Beridze was awarded the Order of Honour of Georgia in 1999. He was awarded the Serge Durmishidze prize in Biochemistry in 2009.

== Selected publications ==
- Beridze TG, Odintsova MS, Sissakian NM (1967) Distribution of bean leaf DNA components in the cell organelle fractions. Molek.Biol.USSR. 1,142-153
- Beridze TG (1972) DNA nuclear satellites of the genus Phaseolus. Biochim. Biophys. Acta 262,393-396
- Beridze TG (1975) DNA nuclear satellites of the genus Brassica: variation between species. Biochim.Biophys.Acta. 395,274-279
- Beridze T. Satellite DNA, 1986, Springer-Verlag, Berlin, Heidelberg, New York, Tokio
- Beridze T, Pipia I, Beck J., Hsu S.-CT, Gamkrelidze M, Gogniashvili M, Tabidze V, This R, Bacilieri P, Gotsiridze V, Glonti M, Schaal B (2011). Plastid DNA sequence diversity in a worldwide set of grapevine cultivars (Vitis vinifera L. subsp. vinifera). Bulletin of the Georgian National Academy of Sciences. 5, 2011, 98–103.
- Pipia I, Gogniashvili M, Tabidze V, Beridze T, Gamkrelidze M, Gotsiridze V, Melyan G, Musayev M, Salimov V, Beck J, Schaal B (2012) Plastid DNA sequence diversity in wild grapevine samples (Vitis vinifera subsp. sylvestris) from the Caucasus region. Vitis 51 (3), 119–124
- Tabidze V, Baramidze G, Pipia I, Gogniashvili M, Ujmajuridze L, Beridze T, Hernandez AG, Schaal B (2014) The Complete Chloroplast DNA Sequence of Eleven Grape Cultivars. Simultaneous Resequencing Methodology. Journal International des Sciences de la Vigne et du Vin J Int Sci Vigne Vin. 48, 99-109
- Tabidze V, Pipia I, Gogniashvili M, Kunelauri N, Ujmajuridze L, Pirtskhalava M, Vishnepolsky B, Hernandez AG, Fields CJ, BeridzeT (2017) Whole genome comparative analysis of four Georgian grape cultivars. Molecular Genetics and Genomics. 292, 1377-1389
- Gogniashvili M., Naskidashvili P., Bedoshvili D., Kotorashvili A., Kotaria N., Beridze T. (2015) Complete chloroplast DNA sequences of Zanduri wheat (Triticum spp.) Genet Resour Crop Evol
- Gogniashvili M, Jinjikhadze T, Maisaia M, Akhalkatsi M, Kotorashvili A, Kotaria N, Beridze T, Dudnikov AJ (2016) Complete chloroplast genomes of Aegilops tauschii Coss. and Ae.cylindrica Host sheds light on plasmon D evolution. Current Genetics.
- Gogniashvili M, Maisaia I, Kotorashvili A, Kotaria N, Beridze T (2018) Complete chloroplast DNA sequences of Georgian indigenous polyploid wheats (Triticum spp.) and B plasmon evolution. Genet Resour Crop Evol 65:1995–2002
