= Phil Drabble =

English countryman

- Born: Philip Percy Cooper Drabble; 13 May 1914
- Died: 29 July 2007 (aged 93); Abbots Bromley, Staffordshire, England
- Occupation(s): Author, television presenter
- Awards: OBE

Philip Percy Cooper Drabble OBE (13 May 1914 – 29 July 2007) was an English countryman, author and television presenter (notably One Man and His Dog). Brought up in the Black Country, he later lived in – and wrote mostly about – the countryside of north Worcestershire and at Abbots Bromley in East Staffordshire, where he created a nature reserve.

== Biography ==
=== Early life ===
Drabble was an only child, whose mother died when he was young. His father was a GP and they lived in a terraced house in Bloxwich. He began work as a factory lad and rose to the board of Salters and membership of the management board of the Midland Engineering Employers Association.

In 1947, he made his first radio broadcast, and in 1952 his first television appearance. At the age of 47 he became a full-time writer, and he and his wife Jess purchased a derelict folly-styled cottage and 90 acres (36 ha) of neglected ancient woodland in Abbots Bromley, Staffordshire, a remnant of the Needwood Forest.

=== One Man and His Dog and later life ===
Drabble was best known as presenter of the long-running TV series One Man and His Dog, in which he commentated on sheepdog trials for 17 years from 1976 to 1993. At its peak the BBC programme attracted more than 8 million viewers and even the Queen was a fan, asking Drabble for advice after her liberty budgies were attacked by hawks at Windsor. Declared Midlander of the Year in 1992, and made OBE in the year he retired from the programme, he announced in 1993 that it had become "a bit boring watching dogs chase stroppy sheep round a field."

A pub very near Drabble's former home in Bloxwich is named "One Man and His Dog" in his honour.

=== Later life ===
Drabble, who also wrote a newspaper column for the Express & Star, took few holidays, travelled abroad only a couple of times, and was proud to have never lived more than 20 miles from his place of birth.

He and his wife turned the woodland they had bought and lived next to into the Goat Lodge Reserve. After a fight with Center Parcs who wanted to build a centre just outside its borders, it became a recognised Site of Special Scientific Interest.

Predeceased by eighteen months by his wife, Drabble died at his home in Abbots Bromley on 29 July 2007, at the age of 93. Having never had any children, he left the majority of his £1,013,523 estate to his PA of 25 years, Ruth Froggatt.

== Bibliography ==
- Staffordshire (1948) ISBN 7-270-00407-2
- The Black Country (1952) ISBN 7-240-01235-2
- A Weasel in My Meatsafe (1957) ISBN 0-7181-1635-6
- The Penguin Book of Pets (1964)
- Badgers at My Window, Pelham Books, (1969) ISBN 0-7207-0299-2
  - reprint, Dickson Price, (1989) ISBN 0-85380-186-X
- My Beloved Wilderness, Pelham Books, (1971) ISBN 0-7207-0519-3
- Phil Drabble's Country Scene, Pelham Books, (1974) ISBN 0-7207-0779-X
- Design for a Wilderness (1973) ISBN 0-7207-0706-4
- Pleasing Pets (1975) ISBN 0-86002-050-9
- Book of Pets (1976)
- Country Seasons (with a foreword by Johnny Morris) Michael Joseph (1976) ISBN 0-7181-1548-1
- One Man and His Dog Michael Joseph (1978) ISBN 0-7181-1668-2
- Of Pedigree Unknown: Sporting & Working Dogs (1976) ISBN 0-7181-1447-7
- No Badgers in My Wood Michael Joseph (1979) ISBN 0-7181-1853-7
- Country Wise (1980) ISBN 0-7181-1952-5
- In the Country (The book of the BBC TV series presented by Angela Rippon) by Angela Rippon, Phil Drabble, Bernard Price, and Ted Moult (1980)
- Four Seasons: The Life of the English Countryside, by Sheila Mannes-Abbott and Phil Drabble (1981)
- It's a Dog's Life, Michael Joseph (1983) ISBN 0-7181-2232-1
- Country Moods, (A selection of his columns for The Birmingham Evening Mail) Michael Joseph (1985) ISBN 0-7181-2590-8
- What Price the Countryside?, Michael Joseph (1985) ISBN 0-7181-2345-X
- My Wilderness in Bloom, Michael Joseph (1986) ISBN 0-7181-2691-2
- Sport and the English Countryside: The World of John Moore, by Phil Drabble, John Moore, and Daphne Moore (1987)
- A Voice in the Wilderness, Pelham Books, (1991) - Autobiography. ISBN 0-7207-1908-9
- One Man and His Dog (vol.2, 1989)
- Walking - Britain's Most Beautiful Nature Trails (Activity Guides) (1992)
- My Wilderness Reprieved (1993)
