= Minisatellite =

Repeating segment of DNA (10-60 base pairs)

In genetics, a minisatellite is a tract of repetitive DNA in which certain DNA motifs (ranging in length from 10–60 base pairs) are typically repeated two to several hundred times. Minisatellites occur at more than 1,000 locations in the human genome and they are notable for their high mutation rate and high diversity in the population. Minisatellites are prominent in the centromeres and telomeres of chromosomes, the latter protecting the chromosomes from damage. The name "satellite" refers to the early observation that centrifugation of genomic DNA in a test tube separates a prominent layer of bulk DNA from accompanying "satellite" layers of repetitive DNA. Minisatellites are small sequences of DNA that do not encode proteins but appear throughout the genome hundreds of times, with many repeated copies lying next to each other.

Minisatellites and their shorter cousins, the microsatellites, together are classified as VNTR (variable number of tandem repeats) DNA. Confusingly, minisatellites are often referred to as VNTRs, and microsatellites are often referred to as short tandem repeats (STRs) or simple sequence repeats (SSRs).

== Structure ==
Minisatellites consist of repetitive, generally GC-rich, motifs that range in length from 10 to over 100 base pairs. These variant repeats are tandemly intermingled. Some minisatellites contain a central sequence (or "core unit") of nucleobases "GGGCAGGANG" (where N can be any base) or more generally consist of sequence motifs of purines (adenine (A) and guanine (G)) and pyrimidines (cytosine (C) and thymine (T)).

Hypervariable minisatellites have core units 9–64 bp long and are found mainly at the centromeric regions.

In humans, 90% of minisatellites are found at the sub-telomeric region of chromosomes. The human telomere sequence itself is a tandem repeat: TTAGGG TTAGGG TTAGGG ...

== Function ==
Minisatellites have been implicated as regulators of gene expression (e.g. at levels of transcription, alternative splicing, or imprint control). They are generally non-coding DNA but sometimes are part of possible genes.

Minisatellites also constitute the chromosomal telomeres, which protect the ends of a chromosome from deterioration or from fusion with neighbouring chromosomes.

== Mutability ==
Minisatellites have been associated with chromosome fragile sites and are proximal to a number of recurrent translocation breakpoints.

Some human minisatellites (~1%) have been demonstrated to be hypermutable, with an average mutation rate in the germline higher than 0.5% up to over 20%, making them the most unstable region in the human genome known to date. While other genomes (mouse, rat and pig) contain minisatellite-like sequences, none was found to be hypermutable. Since all hypermutable minisatellites contain internal variants, they provide extremely informative systems for analyzing the complex turnover processes that occur at this class of tandem repeat. Minisatellite variant repeat mapping by PCR (MVR-PCR) has been extensively used to chart the interspersion patterns of variant repeats along the array, which provides details on the structure of the alleles before and after mutation.

Studies have revealed distinct mutation processes operating in somatic and germline cells. Somatic instability detected in blood DNA shows simple and rare intra-allelic events two to three orders of magnitude lower than in sperm. In contrast, complex inter-allelic conversion-like events occur in the germline.

Additional analyses of DNA sequences flanking human minisatellites have also revealed an intense and highly localized meiotic crossover hotspot that is centered upstream of the unstable side of minisatellite arrays. Repeat turnover therefore appears to be controlled by recombinational activity in DNA that flanks the repeat array and results in a polarity of mutation. These findings have suggested that minisatellites most probably evolved as bystanders of localized meiotic recombination hotspots in the human genome.

It has been proposed that minisatellite sequences encourage chromosomes to swap DNA. In alternative models, it is the presence of neighbouring double-strand hotspots which is the primary cause of minisatellite repeat copy number variations. Somatic changes are suggested to result from replication difficulties (which might include replication slippage, among other phenomena).

Studies have shown that the evolutionary fate of minisatellites tends towards an equilibrium distribution in the size of alleles, until mutations in the flanking DNA affect the recombinational activity of a minisatellite by suppressing DNA instability. Such an event would ultimately lead to the extinction of a hypermutable minisatellite by meiotic drive.

== History ==
The first human minisatellite was discovered in 1980 by A.R. Wyman and R. White. Discovering their high level of variability, Sir Alec Jeffreys developed DNA fingerprinting based on minisatellites, solving the first immigration case by DNA in 1985, and the first forensic murder case, the Enderby murders in the United Kingdom, in 1986. Minisatellites were subsequently also used for genetic markers in linkage analysis and population studies, but were soon replaced by microsatellite profiling in the 1990s.

The term satellite DNA originates from the observation in the 1960s of a fraction of sheared DNA that showed a distinct buoyant density, detectable as a "satellite peak" in density gradient centrifugation, and that was subsequently identified as large centromeric tandem repeats. When shorter (10–30-bp) tandem repeats were later identified, they came to be known as minisatellites. Finally, with the discovery of tandem iterations of simple sequence motifs, the term microsatellites was coined.

== See also ==
- Microsatellite
- Tandem repeat
- Telomere
