= X and Anor v Z (Children) and Anor =

2015 British legal case

- Court: Court of Appeal
- Decided: 5 February 2015
- Citation: [2015] EWCA Civ 34

Court membership
- Judges sitting: Lord Dyson; Lord Justice McFarlane; Lord Justice Beatson

Keywords
- DNA profiles; Paternity

X & Anor v Z (Children) & Anor [2015] EWCA 34 is a Court of Appeal case about DNA profiles. It decided that DNA profiles taken for the purposes of a criminal investigation may not be used for any other purpose.

== Facts ==
Z were young children. In 2013 their mother was murdered. The police took swabs of the crime scene and blood samples from victim and perpetrator (the perpetrator having cut his wrists at the scene). They arrested X on suspicion of the murder, and took a mouth swab to get his DNA profile. This proved to a high degree of confidence that blood found at the murder scene was X's blood, and X was subsequently convicted of Z's mother's murder. He was sentenced to life imprisonment.

X began care proceedings, claiming he was the father of Z. X refused to undergo DNA testing that would prove or disprove this claim.

Z's guardian applied to the court for disclosure of DNA profiles from the crime scene. DNA profiles are not the actual DNA evidence, and apart from the mother's DNA profile, the application was for all other DNA profiles to be anonymized; but by a process of logical deduction, they would identify whether X was the father. The relevant local authority supported this claim. The information commissioner supported by the secretary of state resisted it.

At issue before the Court of Appeal were:

- Whether part II of the Police and Criminal Evidence Act 1984 prohibits the use of DNA profiles obtained for criminal law enforcement purposes for any other purpose;
- Whether Section 6 of the Human Rights Act 1998 prevents disclosure of DNA profiles; and
- Whether the courts below reached a perverse conclusion.

== Law ==
Previously, the Police and Criminal Evidence Act required the destruction of crime scene evidence once its criminal law investigation purposes were served. This was modified by Part 1 of the Protection of Freedoms Act 2012 to allow retention.

== Courts below ==
In In the matter of Z (children) [2014] EWHC 1999, President of the High Court Sir James Munby found that in all the circumstances, and in the children's best interests, the DNA profiles should be diclosed subject to stringent limitations and safeguards.

== Judgment ==
The Court of Appeal allowed the appeal, thereby preventing disclosure of the disputed DNA profiles.

== Significance ==
It is not lawful for DNA collected by the police to be used for a paternity test.
