= Alec Jeffreys =

British geneticist (born 1950)

Sir Alec Jeffreys CH FRS MAE
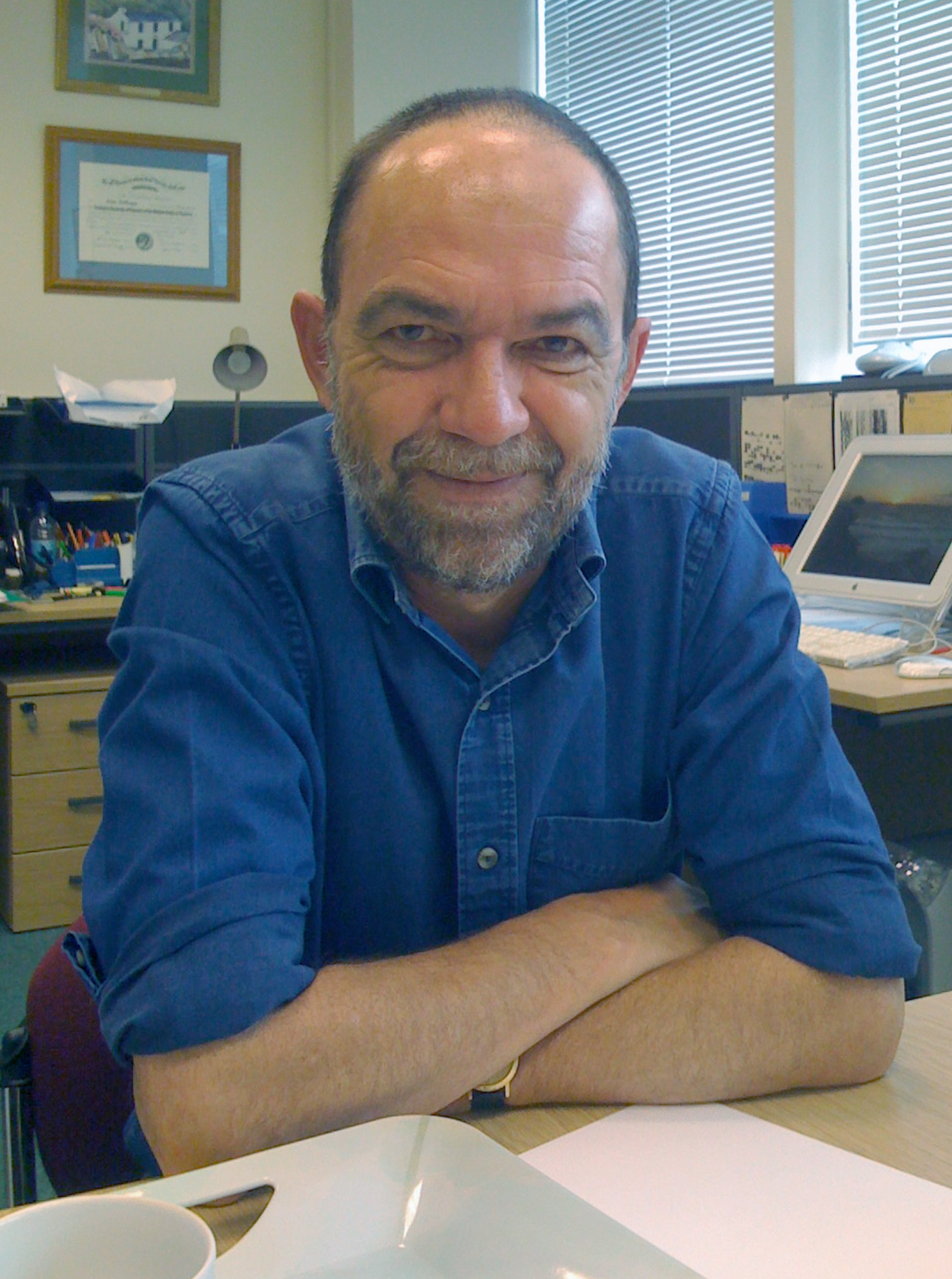
- Alec Jeffreys, 2009
- Born: 9 January 1950 (age 76); Oxford, Oxfordshire, England
- Education: University of Oxford (BA, DPhil)
- Known for: Genetic fingerprinting
- Spouse: Susan Miles (m. 1971)
- Awards: Mendel Medal (1987); Bicentenary Medal (1987); Colworth Medal (1987); Albert Einstein World Award of Science (1996); Louis-Jeantet Prize for Medicine (2004); Lasker award (2005); Royal Medal (2004); Copley Medal (2014); Member of the Order of the Companions of Honour (2016)
- Scientific career
- Fields: Genetics
- Workplaces: University of Amsterdam; University of Leicester
- Thesis: Studies on the mitochondria of cultured mammalian cells (1975)
- Doctoral students: Turi King
- Alec Jeffreys' voice Recorded December 2007 from the BBC Radio 4 programme Desert Island Discs

Sir Alec John Jeffreys (born 9 January 1950) is a British geneticist known for developing techniques for genetic fingerprinting and DNA profiling which are now used worldwide in forensic science to assist police detective work and to resolve paternity and immigration disputes.

Jeffreys is professor of genetics at the University of Leicester, and became an honorary freeman of the City of Leicester on 26 November 1992. In 1994, he was knighted by Queen Elizabeth II for services to genetics.

== Early life and education ==
Jeffreys was born into a middle-class family in Oxford, where he spent the first six years of his life until 1956 when the family moved to Luton, Bedfordshire. He says he inherited his curiosity and inventiveness from his father and paternal grandfather, who held a number of patents. When he was eight, his father gave him a chemistry set, which he enhanced over the next few years with extra chemicals, even including a small bottle of sulphuric acid. He says he liked making small explosions, but an accidental splash of the sulphuric acid caused a burn, which left a permanent scar on his chin (now under his beard). His father also bought him a Victorian-era brass microscope, which he used to examine biological specimens. At about 12, he made a small dissecting kit (including a scalpel, crafted from a flattened pin) which he used to dissect a bumblebee, but he got into trouble with his parents when he progressed to dissecting a larger specimen. One Sunday morning he found a deceased cat on the road while doing his paper round and took it home in his bag. He relates that he started to dissect it on the dining room table before Sunday lunch, causing a foul smell throughout the house after he ruptured its intestines.

Jeffreys was a pupil at Luton Grammar School and then Luton Sixth Form College. He won a scholarship to study at the University of Oxford as an undergraduate of Merton College, Oxford on a four-year course, where he graduated in 1971 with first-class honours in biochemistry. Jeffreys completed his Doctor of Philosophy degree on the mitochondria of cultured mammalian cells, working in the genetics laboratory.

== Career and research ==
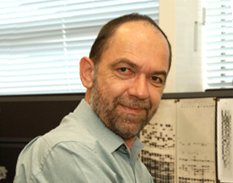
Alec Jeffreys

After finishing his doctorate, he moved to the University of Amsterdam, where he worked on mammalian genes as a research fellow, and then to the University of Leicester in 1977, where in 1984 he discovered a method of showing variations between individuals' DNA, inventing and developing genetic fingerprinting.

=== Genetic fingerprinting ===
Jeffreys says he had a "eureka moment" in his lab in Leicester after looking at the X-ray film image of a DNA experiment on 10 September 1984, which unexpectedly showed both similarities and differences between the DNA of different members of his technician's family. Within about half an hour, he continued, he realised the possible scope of DNA fingerprinting, which uses variations in the genetic information to identify individuals. The method has become important in forensic science to assist police detective work, and it has also proved useful in resolving paternity and immigration disputes. The method can also be applied to non-human species, for example in wildlife population genetics studies. Before his methods were commercialised in 1987, his laboratory was the only centre in the world that carried out DNA fingerprinting, and was consequently very busy, receiving inquiries from all over the globe.

Jeffreys's DNA method was first put to use in 1985 when he was asked to help in a disputed immigration case to confirm the identity of a British boy whose family was originally from Ghana. The case was resolved when the DNA results proved that the boy was closely related to the other members of the family, and Jeffreys saw the relief in the mother's face when she heard the results. DNA fingerprinting was first used in a police forensic test to identify the killer of two teenagers, Lynda Mann and Dawn Ashworth, who had been raped and murdered in Narborough, Leicestershire, in 1983 and 1986 respectively. Colin Pitchfork was identified and convicted of their murders after samples taken from him matched semen samples taken from the two dead girls. This turned out to be an especially important identification; British authorities believe that without it an innocent man would have inevitably been convicted. Not only did Jeffreys' work, in this case, prove who the real killer was, but it exonerated Richard Buckland, initially a prime suspect, who likely would have spent his life in prison otherwise. The story behind the investigations is told in Joseph Wambaugh's 1989 best-selling book The Blooding: The True Story of the Narborough Village Murders and the murders and subsequent solving of the crimes was featured in Episode 4 of the first season of the 1996 American TV series Medical Detectives in which Jeffreys himself also appears. A further television mini-series based on these events was released in 2015, Code of a Killer. In 1992, Jeffreys's methods were used to confirm the identity for German prosecutors of the body of Josef Mengele, who had died in 1979, by comparing DNA obtained from a femur bone of his exhumed skeleton, with DNA from his mother and son, in a similar way to paternity testing.

=== DNA profiling ===
DNA profiling, based on typing individual highly variable minisatellites in the human genome, was also developed by Alec Jeffreys and his team in 1985, with the term (DNA fingerprinting) being retained for the initial test that types many minisatellites simultaneously. By focusing on just a few of these highly variable minisatellites, DNA profiling made the system more sensitive, more reproducible and amenable to computer databases. It soon became the standard forensic DNA system used in criminal case work and paternity testing worldwide.

The development of DNA amplification by the polymerase chain reaction (PCR) opened up new approaches to forensic DNA testing, allowing automation, greatly increased sensitivity, and a move to alternative marker systems. The most commonly used markers are now variable microsatellites, also known as short tandem repeats (STRs), which Jeffreys first exploited in 1990 in the Mengele case. STR profiling was further refined by a team of scientists led by Peter Gill at the Forensic Science Service in the 1990s, allowing the launch of the UK National DNA Database (NDNAD) in 1995. With highly automated and sophisticated equipment, modern-day DNA profiling can process hundreds of samples each day. Sixteen microsatellites, plus a marker for sex determination, are used with the current system developed for the NDNAD, giving a discrimination power of one in over a billion. Under British law, anyone arrested in England, Wales or Northern Ireland has their DNA profile taken and stored on the database whether or not they are convicted (different rules apply in Scotland). The national database in 2020 contained the DNA information of about 5.6 million people. Jeffreys has opposed the current use of DNA profiling, where the government has access to that database, and has instead proposed a database of all people's DNA, access to which would be controlled by an independent third party.

His former doctoral students include Turi King.

=== Awards and honours ===
- 1986 – Elected a Fellow of the Royal Society (FRS)
- 1989 – Press, Radio and TV awards for the Midlander of the Year, 1988, 1989
- 1991 – Appointed as a Royal Society Research Professor
- 26 November 1992 – Honorary freeman of the City of Leicester
- 1994 – Knighted for services to genetics and to science and technology
- 1995 – Honorary member of the International Society for Forensic Genetics
- 1996 – Albert Einstein World Award of Science
- 1998 – Australia Prize, 1998
- 1999 – Sir George Stokes Medal
- 2003 – Association for Molecular Pathology Award for Excellence in Molecular Diagnostics
- 2004 – Honorary doctorate awarded by the University of Leicester, where Jeffreys is a member of staff
- 2004 – Royal Medal of the Royal Society
- 2004 – Pride of Britain Award for Lifetime Achievement
- 2004 – Louis-Jeantet Prize for Medicine
- 2005 – Albert Lasker Award for Clinical Medical Research, jointly with Edwin Southern of the University of Oxford
- 2005 – United States National Academy of Sciences, elected member
- 2006 – Great Briton Award for the Greatest Briton of the year, winner in the category of Science and Innovation, as well as the overall winner
- 2006 – Dr A.H. Heineken Prize for Biochemistry and Biophysics
- 8 March 2007 – Honorary degree from King's College London
- 23 January 2008 – Graham Medal of the Glasgow Philosophical Society, awarded after he gave his lecture "DNA Profiling; Past, present and future", which was nominated as the Graham Lecture
- 16 November 2009 – Awarded Honorary Doctor of Science by the University of Huddersfield
- 14 April 2010 – Awarded Edinburgh Medal
- April 2010 – Officially opened the new Soar Valley College building in Leicester
- 21 February 2011 – Awarded ABRF Annual Award
- 2012 – Officially opened the Sir Alec Jeffreys Building in Wakefield, West Yorkshire, the scientific support building for West Yorkshire Police and the wider Yorkshire and the Humber region
- 2014 – Copley Medal
- 22 January 2014 – Honorary Doctor of Science Degree from De Montfort University
- 2017 – Member of the Order of the Companions of Honour

== Personal life ==
Jeffreys met his future wife, Sue Miles, in a youth club in the centre of Luton, Bedfordshire, before he became a university student, and they married on 28 August 1971. Jeffreys has one brother and one sister; he and his wife have two daughters, born in 1979 and 1983.
