= Differential extraction =

DNA extraction from two cells without their content mixing

Differential extraction (also known as differential lysis) refers to the process by which the DNA from two different types of cells can be extracted without mixing their contents. The most common application of this method is the extraction of DNA from vaginal epithelial cells and sperm cells from sexual assault cases in order to determine the DNA profiles of the victim and the perpetrator. Its success is based on the fact that sperm cells pack their DNA using protamines (rather than histones) which are held together by disulfide bonds. The protamines sequester DNA from spermatozoa, making it more resilient to DNA extraction than DNA from epithelial cells.

After determining that sperm cells are present (typically through staining and light microscopy) in a vaginal/rectal sample, the subject's epithelial cells are lysed by a standard DNA extraction method, like a phenol/chloroform extraction and their DNA is extracted through normal means. The epithelial DNA in the solution is removed and saved, while the sperm cell's DNA precipitates with the attached protamines. Differential extraction uses a chemical called dithiothreitol (DTT) to disrupt the sulfur bonds in the protamines in order to release its DNA. Once the DNA is detached from the protamines, it is prone to standard DNA extraction methods. This creates two different DNA fractions from one sample, that of the victim and that of the perpetrator.

However, the described method is difficult to carry out because it is both very labor-intensive and time-consuming, leading to a build-up of untested rape kits. An estimated 500.000 rape kits alone in the US. Greenspoon et al. reported improvements in sample processing efficiency and throughput using robotic automation. However, associated costs for implementation in conjunction with low-throughput quantities of samples may be impractical for forensic laboratories and cannot be justified.

Recently a multistep nucleic acid extraction procedure was introduced to provide DNA lysates of the highest quality. A self-sealing membrane allows a stepwise release and separation of DNA from mixed specimens. Implemented in a spin-column system, it is ideally suitable for DNA extraction procedures involving differential extraction of forensic samples such as epithelium, saliva or blood vs. sperms. Simple and reliable extraction protocols for both, stained samples as well as gynecological swabs, respectively, overcome the often claimed difficulties in differential extraction (e.g. losing a sperm pellet through several washing steps).

Furthermore, an early qualified decision whether the process of a differential extraction is worth the time and efforts is possible due to gradual buffer separation. As an immunological pre-test for semen in a sample of sexual assault can be carried out using the identical sample.

== Workflow ==
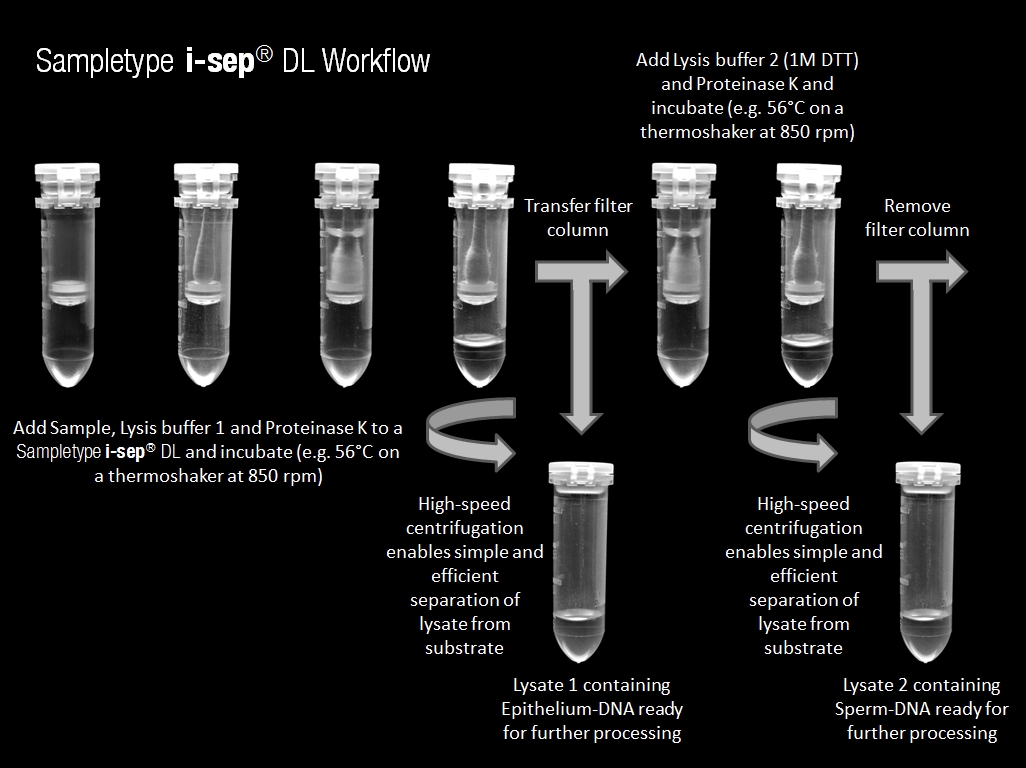
Workflow of the differential lysis of a sample of sexual assault evidence is shown. All steps of the stepwise DNA-extraction process are described in detail.

First of all human proteins, e.g. human semenogelin antigen, can be optional isolated and immunologically analyzed to quick-check for the presence of human seminal fluid. If this test shows a positive result, the same casework sample will be processed further. The first part of the differential lysis is carried out under mild conditions to gain the female DNA. Lysate of the epithelia cells is retained within the column even during heat incubation and moderate shaking. Upon centrifugation, the solution passes the column into the collection tube. The DNA lysate is further purified and used to generate an autosomal STR profile of the victim. To further obtain the male DNA which will identify the perpetrator, harsher lysis conditions will be applied afterwards to the very same filter column without the necessity of sample carriage in order to break open the retained spermatozoa. Due to the high yield of DNA, the chance of a successful DNA-profile by downstream analysis is significantly increased. This simple handling allows time savings and higher throughput in this manual process to improve crime solution rates and to speed up analysis of backlogged crime samples.
