= DNA profiling =

Technique used to identify individuals via DNA characteristics

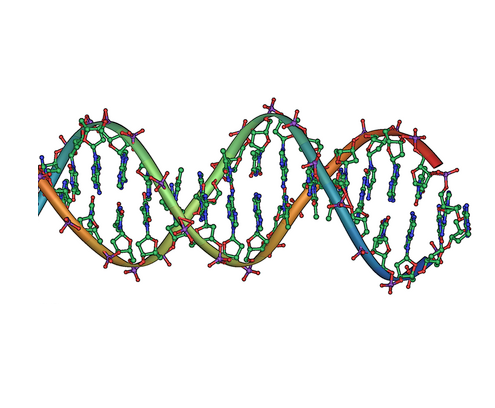
The DNA double helix

DNA profiling (also called DNA fingerprinting and genetic fingerprinting) is the process of determining an individual's deoxyribonucleic acid (DNA) characteristics. DNA analysis intended to identify a species, rather than an individual, is called DNA barcoding.

DNA profiling is a forensic technique in criminal investigations, comparing suspects' profiles to DNA evidence to assess the likelihood of their involvement in the crime. Modern DNA profiling techniques are highly reliable, despite the fact that they only provide a fallible probabilistic estimate of the match between a suspect and an incriminating sample. DNA profiling is also used in paternity testing, to establish immigration eligibility, and in genealogical and medical research. DNA profiling has also been used in the study of animal and plant populations in the fields of zoology, botany, and agriculture. DNA profiling was discovered by British geneticist Sir Alec Jeffreys in 1984 while he was working at the University of Leicester. He developed the technique of genetic fingerprinting by realizing that some regions of DNA have highly variable repetitive sequences that are unique to each individual.

== Background ==
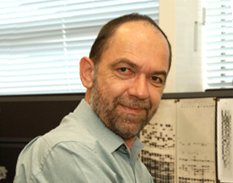
Sir Alec Jeffreys, pioneer of DNA profiling. His discovery led to the conviction of Colin Pitchfork in 1988.

Starting in the mid 1970s, scientific advances allowed the use of DNA as a material for the identification of an individual. The first patent covering the direct use of DNA variation for forensics was issued in 1997, continued from an application first filed by Jeffrey Glassberg in 1983, based upon work he had done while at Rockefeller University in the United States in 1981.

British geneticist Sir Alec Jeffreys independently developed a process for DNA profiling in 1984 while working in the Department of Genetics at the University of Leicester. Jeffreys discovered that a DNA examiner could establish patterns in unknown DNA. These patterns were a part of inherited traits that could be used to advance the field of relationship analysis. These discoveries led to the first use of DNA profiling in a criminal case.

The process, developed by Jeffreys in conjunction with Peter Gill and Dave Werrett of the Forensic Science Service (FSS), was first used forensically in the solving of the murder of two teenagers who had been raped and murdered in Narborough, Leicestershire, in 1983 and 1986. In the murder inquiry, led by Detective David Baker, the DNA contained within blood samples obtained voluntarily from around 5,000 local men who willingly assisted Leicestershire Constabulary with the investigation, resulted in the exoneration of Richard Buckland, an initial suspect who had confessed to one of the crimes, and the subsequent conviction of Colin Pitchfork on 2 January 1988. Pitchfork, a local bakery employee, had coerced his coworker Ian Kelly to stand in for him when providing a blood sample—Kelly then used a forged passport to impersonate Pitchfork. Another coworker reported the deception to the police. Pitchfork was arrested, and his blood was sent to Jeffreys' lab for processing and profile development. Pitchfork's profile matched that of DNA left by the murderer which confirmed Pitchfork's presence at both crime scenes; he pleaded guilty to both murders. After some years, Imperial Chemical Industries (ICI) introduced the first ever commercially available kit to the world. Despite being a relatively recent field, it had a significant global influence on both criminal justice system and society.

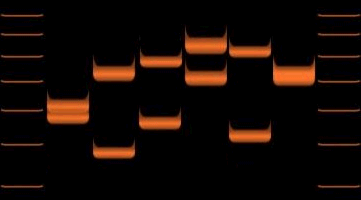
Variations of VNTR allele lengths in 6 individuals

Although 99.9% of human DNA sequences are the same in every person, enough of the DNA is different that it is possible to distinguish one individual from another, unless they are monozygotic (identical) twins. DNA profiling uses repetitive sequences that are highly variable, called variable number tandem repeats (VNTRs), in particular short tandem repeats (STRs), also known as microsatellites, and minisatellites. VNTR loci are similar between closely related individuals, but are so variable that unrelated individuals are unlikely to have the same VNTRs.

Before VNTRs and STRs, people like Jeffreys used a process called restriction fragment length polymorphism (RFLP). This process regularly used large portions of DNA to analyze the differences between two DNA samples. RFLP was among the first technologies used in DNA profiling and analysis. However, as technology has evolved, new technologies, like STR, emerged and took the place of older technology like RFLP.

The admissibility of DNA evidence in courts was disputed in the United States in the 1980s and 1990s, but has since become more universally accepted due to improved techniques.

== Profiling processes ==
=== DNA extraction ===
When a sample such as blood or saliva is obtained, the DNA is only a small part of what is present in the sample. Before the DNA can be analyzed, it must be extracted from the cells and purified. There are many ways this can be accomplished, but all methods follow the same basic procedure. The cell and nuclear membranes need to be broken up to allow the DNA to be free in solution. Once the DNA is free, it can be separated from all other cellular components. After the DNA has been separated in solution, the remaining cellular debris can then be removed from the solution and discarded, leaving only DNA. The most common methods of DNA extraction include organic extraction (also called phenol–chloroform extraction), Chelex extraction, and solid-phase extraction. Differential extraction is a modified version of extraction in which DNA from two different types of cells can be separated from each other before being purified from the solution. Each method of extraction works well in the laboratory, but analysts typically select their preferred method based on factors such as the cost, the time involved, the quantity of DNA yielded, and the quality of DNA yielded.

Besides concentrating the DNA, extraction also separates the DNA from materials that would degrade the DNA such as nucleases.

=== RFLP analysis ===
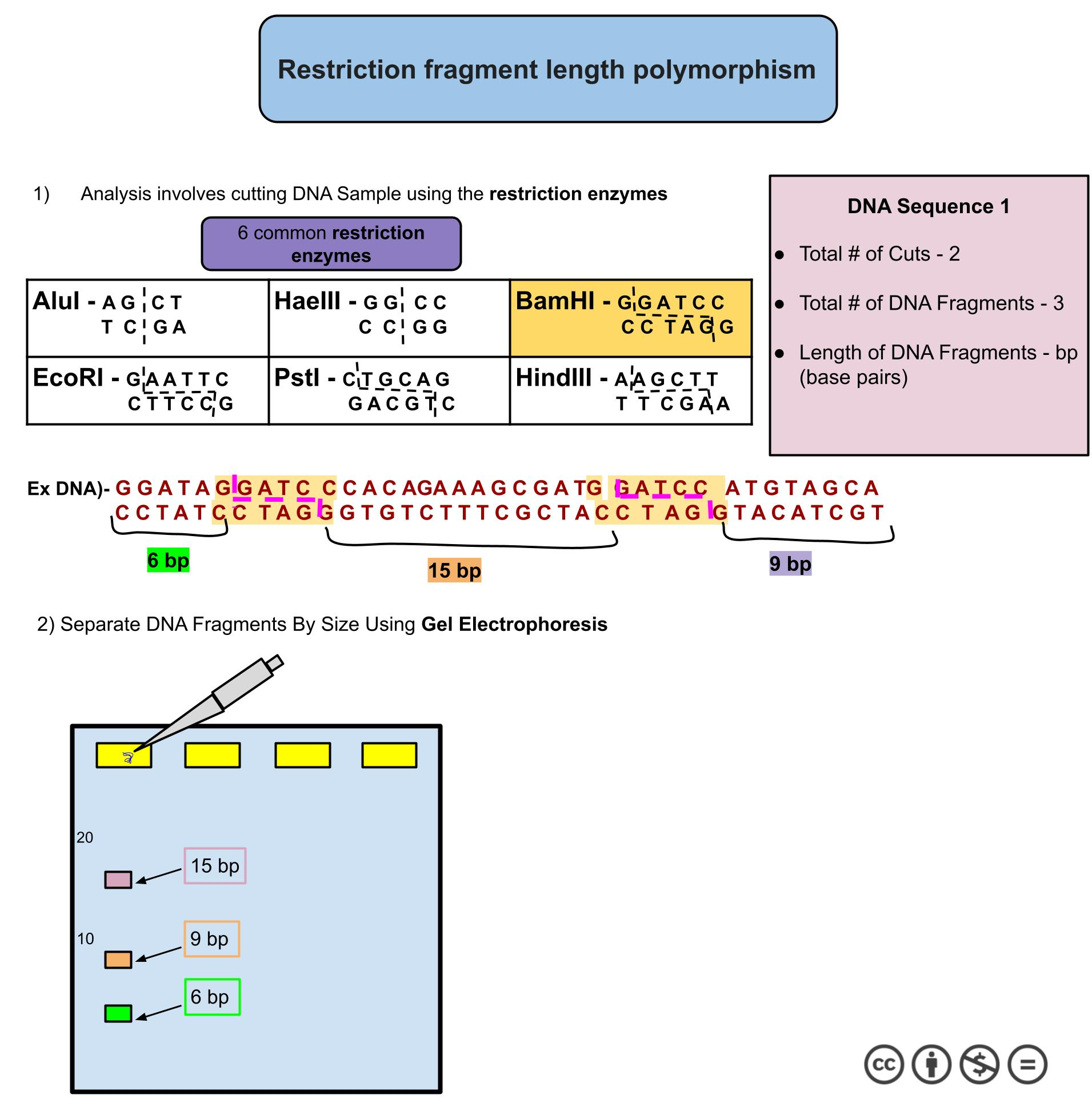
Restriction Fragment Length Polymorphism

RFLP is an application of the southern blot technique. The scientists chooses a mix of restriction enzymes, enzymes that "cut" the short and specific sequences throughout the sample. The enzyme is used to digest the DNA sample. Gel electrophoresis of nucleic acids, which uses an electric field to cause different sizes of DNA to move at different speeds, is used to perform an initial separation by size.

At this point the DNA has been separated by size but remains invisible. A thin nitrocellulose or nylon membrane is pressed onto the gel for some time so that the DNA is imprinted as a pattern on the membrane. The membrane is then baked or exposed to ultraviolet light to permanently attach the DNA onto the membrane. To this membrane with baked-on DNA, a hybridization probe is used to highlight the part of the DNA that matches the sequence of the probe. The probe is usually either radioactive or chemiluminescent so that its location can be recorded as a picture of the "bands", each corresponding to a size-group of DNA that match the probe.

RFLP analysis works by comparing the position of bands (which corresponds to the sizes of probe-matching fragments) across different people.

=== Polymerase chain reaction (PCR) ===
PCR is a way to cyclically amplify portions of DNAs that match certain primer(s). It was developed in 1983 by Kary Mullis. PCR is now a common and important technique used in medical and biological research labs for a variety of applications. Amplification is achieved by cycling the following three steps:

1. Denaturation: Heat mixture containing DNA to 95 °C so the two strands become separate from each other.
2. Annealing: Cool the mixture to 50–65 °C so the primers can attach to the DNA by forming complementary base pairs.
3. Extension: A DNA polymerase starts from where the primer binds to the DNA (duplex) and builds out a complementary chain of DNA.

Steps of polymerase chain reaction

By using either specific primers that target a certain area or random primers, PCR can be used for a great variety of analysis tasks.

==== Paired primers ====
One classical use of PCR is to selective amplify an area between a pair of two primers; because the target fragment size would be known beforehand, no restriction enzymes are needed (though they certainly can be incorporated). The product can then be separated by size using gel electrophoresis, like described above for southern blotting, and visualized by transferring onto a membrane in the same way. The resulting image would show bands of expected size if the area exists, no band if nothing of appropriate size matches the area, or a different size if something matches but is a different length; all of these are good information for differentiating species of organisms.

If one targets an area that is known to either match with a fixed size or not match in the overwhelming majority of cases, then the band either exists or doesn't. In this case, many pairs of primers that matches areas of different lengths can be used together (if they do not end up matching extra areas), allowing the presence or absence of them to be analyzed in a single PCR reaction. This is PCR fingerprinting.

===== STR analysis =====
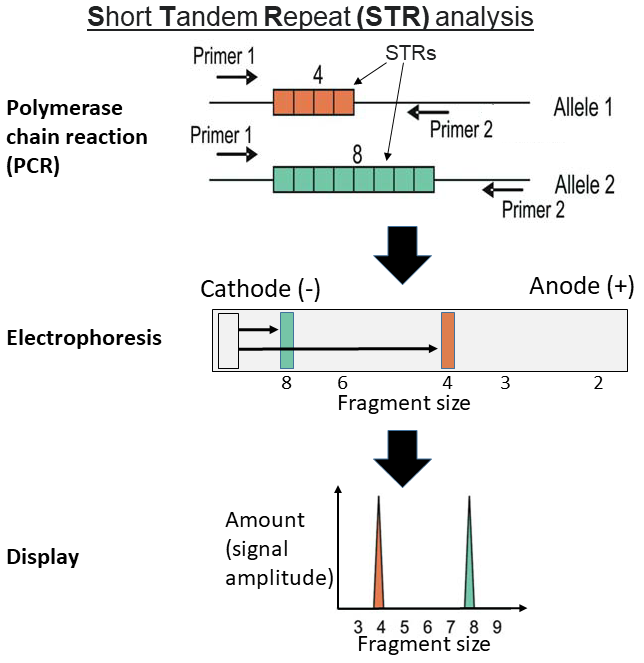
Short Tandem Repeat (STR) analysis on a simplified model: First, a DNA sample undergoes polymerase chain reaction with primers targeting certain STRs (which vary in lengths between individuals and their alleles). The resultant fragments are separated by size (such as electrophoresis).

A kind of human genetic variation that is easy to spot as size difference are the short tandem repeats (STR)s, where a very short and simple sequence is repeated many times. These kind of sites generate a lot of variation between people because they are "slippery": the DNA polymerase can slip and end up skipping or adding a few copies. STR analysis is a specific version of the classical paired-primer PCR fingerprinting, in that the primers are targeting areas with known STR. By targeting an area that varies greatly between people, it turns PCR fingerprinting from a species-identification technique used in biology into a family-, even individual-identifying technique usable in forensics.

From country to country, different STR-based DNA-profiling systems are in use. In North America, systems that amplify the CODIS 20 core loci are almost universal, whereas in the United Kingdom the DNA-17 loci system is in use, and Australia uses 18 core markers.

The true power of STR analysis is in its statistical power of discrimination. Because the 20 loci that are currently used for discrimination in CODIS are independently assorted (having a certain number of repeats at one locus does not change the likelihood of having any number of repeats at any other locus), the product rule for probabilities can be applied. This means that, if someone has the DNA type of ABC, where the three loci were independent, then the probability of that individual having that DNA type is the probability of having type A times the probability of having type B times the probability of having type C. This has resulted in the ability to generate match probabilities of 1 in a quintillion (1 × 10^{18}) or more. However, DNA database searches showed much more frequent than expected false DNA profile matches.

===== Y-chromosome =====
Standard STR analysis kits mostly focus on autosomal STRs, but most usually include one that tests for AMELY, the Y-chromosomal copy of the amelogenin gene, to indicate whether the Y chromosome is present. (This single data point could rule out 50% of suspects.) A very small amount of people have a variant of AMELY undetectable by this area, so some kits also add up to 4 Y-chromosomal indels and STRs.

Y chromosomal STRs are used in much of the same way as the autosomal STRs, with the added knowledge that it only passes down the paternal line. Kits specialized for Y STR test for up to 27 loci; 8 is the "minimal haplotype" set. The "Y haplotype reference database (YHRD)" has been created in 2000 as an online resource. It currently comprises more than 300,000 minimal (8 locus) haplotypes from world-wide populations as well as data on their frequency.

===== Sequencing =====
Another reason to amplify any kind of DNA is to prepare for DNA sequencing. By going beyond comparing the sizes of pieces, much more genetic variation can be detected, especially the single-nucleotide polymorphisms.

For example, mitochondrial DNA (mtDNA) is present in many copies in human cells, so more of it tends to be recoverable even in DNA-poor sample types such as bone, teeth, and hair. Most of its interhuman variation concentrated in the "control region", so forensic analysis targets it with a pair of primers to make many copies. mtDNA is inherited down the maternal line.

== Profiling applications ==
DNA profiling has been applied to the identification of microbial, fungal, plant and animal individuals. A variant of PCR, arbitrarily amplified DNA, has been particularly useful in DNA fingerprinting applications. For example, random amplified polymorphic DNA (RAPD), arbitrarily primed PCR (AP-PCR), DNA amplification fingerprinting (DAF) use arbitrary primers to target anonymous regions in a genome generating unique genetic fingerprints. These arbitrarily amplified method have been widely used for the fingerprinting of bacteria and plants, helping in forensic, breeding, and population genetic analyses. Similarly, the widely used amplified fragment length polymorphism (AFLP) technique uses a combination of restriction enzymes and PCR amplification to target anonymous regions for DNA profiling of a wide range of organisms. With the advent of high-throughput sequencing, reduced-representation sequencing methods such as restriction site associated DNA sequencing (RAD-seq) enable genome-wide marker discovery and genotyping for a wide range of applications .

The use of molecular marker techniques in plant fingerprinting for example allows identification of cultivars and accessions. Their use is gaining attention due to Trade Related Intellectual property rights (TRIPs) and the Convention on Biological Diversity (CBD). In particular, DNA fingerprinting of medical plants permits identification, authentication, distinction, and detection of phytoconstituents and adulteration in plants. DNA profiling is becoming critical for these applications, determining the future of scientific study in pharmacognosy. The techniques also help with determining the traits (such as seed size and leaf color) that are likely to improve offspring success.

== Issues with forensic DNA samples ==
When people think of DNA analysis, they often think about television shows like NCIS or CSI, which portray DNA samples coming into a lab and being instantly analyzed, followed by the pulling up of a picture of the suspect within minutes. However, the reality is quite different, and perfect DNA samples are often not collected from the scene of a crime. Homicide victims are frequently left exposed to harsh conditions before they are found, and objects that are used to commit crimes have often been handled by more than one person. The two most prevalent issues that forensic scientists encounter when analyzing DNA samples are degraded samples and DNA mixtures.

=== Degraded DNA ===
Before modern PCR methods existed, it was almost impossible to analyze degraded DNA samples. Methods like restriction fragment length polymorphism (RFLP), which was the first technique used for DNA analysis in forensic science, required high molecular weight DNA in the sample in order to get reliable data. High molecular weight DNA, however, is lacking in degraded samples, as the DNA is too fragmented to carry out RFLP accurately. It was only when polymerase chain reaction techniques were invented that analysis of degraded DNA samples were able to be carried out. Multiplex PCR in particular made it possible to isolate and to amplify the small fragments of DNA that are still left in degraded samples. When multiplex PCR methods are compared to the older methods like RFLP, a vast difference can be seen. Multiplex PCR can theoretically amplify less than 1 ng of DNA, but RFLP had to have a least 100 ng of DNA in order to carry out an analysis.

=== Low-template DNA ===
Low-template DNA can happen when there is less than 0.1 ng of DNA in a sample. This can lead to more stochastic effects (random events) such as allelic dropout or allelic drop-in which can alter the interpretation of a DNA profile. These stochastic effects can lead to the unequal amplification of the 2 alleles that come from a heterozygous individual. It is especially important to take low-template DNA into account when dealing with a mixture of DNA sample. This is because for one (or more) of the contributors in the mixture, they are more likely to have less than the optimal amount of DNA for the PCR reaction to work properly. Therefore, stochastic thresholds are developed for DNA profile interpretation. The stochastic threshold is the minimum peak height (RFU value), seen in an electropherogram where dropout occurs. If the peak height value is above this threshold, then it is reasonable to assume that allelic dropout has not occurred. For example, if only 1 peak is seen for a particular locus in the electropherogram but its peak height is above the stochastic threshold, then we can reasonably assume that this individual is homozygous and is not missing its heterozygous partner allele that otherwise would have dropped out due to having low-template DNA. Allelic dropout can occur when there is low-template DNA because there is such little DNA to start with that at this locus the contributor to the DNA sample (or mixture) is a true heterozygote but the other allele is not amplified and so it would be lost. Allelic drop-in can also occur when there is low-template DNA because sometimes the stutter peak can be amplified. The stutter is an artifact of PCR. During the PCR reaction, DNA Polymerase will come in and add nucleotides off of the primer, but this whole process is very dynamic, meaning that the DNA Polymerase is constantly binding, popping off and then rebinding. Therefore, sometimes DNA Polymerase will rejoin at the short tandem repeat ahead of it, leading to a short tandem repeat that is 1 repeat less than the template. During PCR, if DNA Polymerase happens to bind to a locus in stutter and starts to amplify it to make lots of copies, then this stutter product will appear randomly in the electropherogram, leading to allelic drop-in.

==== MiniSTR analysis ====
In instances in which DNA samples are degraded, like if there are intense fires or all that remains are bone fragments, standard STR testing on those samples can be inadequate. When standard STR testing is done on highly degraded samples, the larger STR loci often drop out, and only partial DNA profiles are obtained. Partial DNA profiles can be a powerful tool, but the probability of a random match is larger than if a full profile was obtained. One method that has been developed to analyse degraded DNA samples is to use miniSTR technology. In the new approach, primers are specially designed to bind closer to the STR region.

In normal STR testing, the primers bind to longer sequences that contain the STR region within the segment. MiniSTR analysis, however, targets only the STR location, which results in a DNA product that is much smaller.

By placing the primers closer to the actual STR regions, there is a higher chance that successful amplification of this region will occur. Successful amplification of those STR regions can now occur, and more complete DNA profiles can be obtained. The success that smaller PCR products produce a higher success rate with highly degraded samples was first reported in 1995, when miniSTR technology was used to identify victims of the Waco fire.

=== DNA mixtures ===
Mixtures are another common issue faced by forensic scientists when they are analyzing unknown or questionable DNA samples. A mixture is defined as a DNA sample that contains two or more individual contributors. That can often occur when a DNA sample is swabbed from an item that is handled by more than one person or when a sample contains both the victim's and the assailant's DNA. The presence of more than one individual in a DNA sample can make it challenging to detect individual profiles, and interpretation of mixtures should be performed only by highly trained individuals. Mixtures that contain two or three individuals can be interpreted with difficulty. Mixtures that contain four or more individuals are much too convoluted to get individual profiles. One common scenario in which a mixture is often obtained is in the case of sexual assault. A sample may be collected that contains material from the victim, the victim's consensual sexual partners, and the perpetrator(s).

Mixtures can generally be sorted into three categories: Type A, Type B, and Type C. Type A mixtures have alleles with similar peak-heights all around, so the contributors cannot be distinguished from each other. Type B mixtures can be deconvoluted by comparing peak-height ratios to determine which alleles were donated together. Type C mixtures cannot be safely interpreted with current technology because the samples were affected by DNA degradation or having too small a quantity of DNA present.

When looking at an electropherogram, it is possible to determine the number of contributors in less complex mixtures based on the number of peaks located in each locus. In comparison to a single source profile, which will only have one or two peaks at each locus, a mixture is when there are three or more peaks at two or more loci. If there are three peaks at only a single locus, then it is possible to have a single contributor who is tri-allelic at that locus. Two person mixtures will have between two and four peaks at each locus, and three person mixtures will have between three and six peaks at each locus. Mixtures become increasingly difficult to deconvolute as the number of contributors increases.

As detection methods in DNA profiling advance, forensic scientists are seeing more DNA samples that contain mixtures, as even the smallest contributor can now be detected by modern tests. The ease in which forensic scientists have in interpenetrating DNA mixtures largely depends on the ratio of DNA present from each individual, the genotype combinations, and the total amount of DNA amplified. The DNA ratio is often the most important aspect to look at in determining whether a mixture can be interpreted. For example, if a DNA sample had two contributors, it would be easy to interpret individual profiles if the ratio of DNA contributed by one person was much higher than the second person. When a sample has three or more contributors, it becomes extremely difficult to determine individual profiles. Fortunately, advancements in probabilistic genotyping may make that sort of determination possible in the future. Probabilistic genotyping uses complex computer software to run through thousands of mathematical computations to produce statistical likelihoods of individual genotypes found in a mixture.

== DNA databases ==
An early application of a DNA database was the compilation of a Mitochondrial DNA Concordance, prepared by Kevin W. P. Miller and John L. Dawson at the University of Cambridge from 1996 to 1999 from data collected as part of Miller's PhD thesis. There are now several DNA databases in existence around the world. Some are private, but most of the largest databases are government-controlled. The United States maintains the largest DNA database, with the Combined DNA Index System (CODIS) holding over 13 million records as of May 2018. The United Kingdom maintains the National DNA Database (NDNAD), which is of similar size, despite the UK's smaller population. The size of this database, and its rate of growth, are giving concern to civil liberties groups in the UK, where police have wide-ranging powers to take samples and retain them even in the event of acquittal. The Conservative–Liberal Democrat coalition partially addressed these concerns with part 1 of the Protection of Freedoms Act 2012, under which DNA samples must be deleted if suspects are acquitted or not charged, except in relation to certain (mostly serious or sexual) offenses. Public discourse around the introduction of advanced forensic techniques (such as genetic genealogy using public genealogy databases and DNA phenotyping approaches) has been limited, disjointed, unfocused, and raises issues of privacy and consent that may warrant the establishment of additional legal protections.

The U.S. Patriot Act of the United States provides a means for the U.S. government to get DNA samples from suspected terrorists. DNA information from crimes is collected and deposited into the CODIS database, which is maintained by the FBI. CODIS enables law enforcement officials to test DNA samples from crimes for matches within the database, providing a means of finding specific biological profiles associated with collected DNA evidence.

When a match is made from a national DNA databank to link a crime scene to an offender having provided a DNA sample to a database, that link is often referred to as a cold hit. A cold hit is of value in referring the police agency to a specific suspect but is of less evidential value than a DNA match made from outside the DNA Databank.

FBI agents cannot legally store DNA of a person not convicted of a crime. DNA collected from a suspect not later convicted must be disposed of and not entered into the database. In 1998, a man residing in the UK was arrested on accusation of burglary. His DNA was taken and tested, and he was later released. Nine months later, this man's DNA was accidentally and illegally entered in the DNA database. New DNA is automatically compared to the DNA found at cold cases and, in this case, this man was found to be a match to DNA found at a rape and assault case one year earlier. The government then prosecuted him for these crimes. During the trial the DNA match was requested to be removed from the evidence because it had been illegally entered into the database. The request was carried out. The DNA of the perpetrator, collected from victims of rape, can be stored for years until a match is found. In 2014, to address this problem, Congress extended a bill that helps states deal with "a backlog" of evidence.

DNA profiling databases in Plants:

PIDS:

PIDS(Plant international DNA-fingerprinting system) is an open source web server and free software based plant international DNA fingerprinting system.

It manages huge amount of microsatellite DNA fingerprint data, performs genetic studies, and automates collection, storage and maintenance while decreasing human error and increasing efficiency.

The system may be tailored to specific laboratory needs, making it a valuable tool for plant breeders, forensic science, and human fingerprint recognition.

It keeps track of experiments, standardizes data and promotes inter-database communication.

It also helps with the regulation of variety quality, the preservation of variety rights and the use of molecular markers in breeding by providing location statistics, merging, comparison and genetic analysis function.

== Considerations in evaluating DNA evidence ==
When using RFLP, the theoretical risk of a coincidental match is 1 in 100 billion (100,000,000,000) although the practical risk is actually 1 in 1,000 because monozygotic twins are 0.2% of the human population. Moreover, the rate of laboratory error is almost certainly higher than that and actual laboratory procedures often do not reflect the theory under which the coincidence probabilities were computed. For example, coincidence probabilities may be calculated based on the probabilities that markers in two samples have bands in precisely the same location, but a laboratory worker may conclude that similar but not precisely-identical band patterns result from identical genetic samples with some imperfection in the agarose gel. However, in that case, the laboratory worker increases the coincidence risk by expanding the criteria for declaring a match. Studies conducted in the 2000s quoted relatively-high error rates, which may be cause for concern. In the early days of genetic fingerprinting, the necessary population data to compute a match probability accurately was sometimes unavailable. Between 1992 and 1996, arbitrary-low ceilings were controversially put on match probabilities used in RFLP analysis, rather than the higher theoretically computed ones.

=== Evidence of genetic relationship ===
It is possible to use DNA profiling as evidence of genetic relationship although such evidence varies in strength from weak to positive. Testing that shows no relationship is absolutely certain. Further, while almost all individuals have a single and distinct set of genes, ultra-rare individuals, known as "chimeras", have at least two different sets of genes. There have been two cases of DNA profiling that falsely suggested that a mother was unrelated to her children.

== Fake DNA evidence ==
The functional analysis of genes and their coding sequences (open reading frames [ORFs]) typically requires that each ORF be expressed, the encoded protein purified, antibodies produced, phenotypes examined, intracellular localization determined, and interactions with other proteins sought. In a study conducted by the life science company Nucleix and published in the journal Forensic Science International, scientists found that an in vitro synthesized sample of DNA matching any desired genetic profile can be constructed using standard molecular biology techniques without obtaining any actual tissue from that person.

== DNA evidence in criminal trials ==
=== Familial DNA searching ===
Familial DNA searching (sometimes referred to as "familial DNA" or "familial DNA database searching") is the practice of creating new investigative leads in cases where DNA evidence found at the scene of a crime (forensic profile) strongly resembles that of an existing DNA profile (offender profile) in a state DNA database but there is not an exact match. After all other leads have been exhausted, investigators may use specially developed software to compare the forensic profile to all profiles taken from a state's DNA database to generate a list of those offenders already in the database who are most likely to be a very close relative of the individual whose DNA is in the forensic profile.

Familial DNA database searching was first used in an investigation leading to a conviction in the case of Jeffrey Gafoor of the murder of Lynette White in the United Kingdom on 4 July 2003: a year previously, familial DNA matching had been used by South Wales police to identify the triple killer Joseph William Kappen, who had died 11 years earlier. DNA evidence was matched to Gafoor's nephew, who at 14 years old had not been born at the time of the murder in 1988. It was used again in 2004 to find a man who threw a brick from a motorway bridge and hit a lorry driver, killing him. DNA found on the brick matched that found at the scene of a car theft earlier in the day, but there were no good matches on the national DNA database. A wider search found a partial match to an individual; on being questioned, this man revealed he had a brother, Craig Harman, who lived very close to the original crime scene. Harman voluntarily submitted a DNA sample, and confessed when it matched the sample from the brick. As of 2011, familial DNA database searching is not conducted on a national level in the United States, where states determine how and when to conduct familial searches. The first familial DNA search with a subsequent conviction in the United States was conducted in Denver, Colorado, in 2008, using software developed under the leadership of Denver District Attorney Mitch Morrissey and Denver Police Department Crime Lab Director Gregg LaBerge. California was the first state to implement a policy for familial searching under then-Attorney General Jerry Brown, who later became Governor. In his role as consultant to the Familial Search Working Group of the California Department of Justice, former Alameda County Prosecutor Rock Harmon is widely considered to have been the catalyst in the adoption of familial search technology in California. The technique was used to catch the Los Angeles serial killer known as the "Grim Sleeper" in 2010. It was not a witness or informant that tipped off law enforcement to the identity of the "Grim Sleeper" serial killer, who had eluded police for more than two decades, but DNA from the suspect's own son. The suspect's son had been arrested and convicted in a felony weapons charge and swabbed for DNA the year before. When his DNA was entered into the database of convicted felons, detectives were alerted to a partial match to evidence found at the "Grim Sleeper" crime scenes. David Franklin Jr., also known as the Grim Sleeper, was charged with ten counts of murder and one count of attempted murder. More recently, familial DNA led to the arrest of 21-year-old Elvis Garcia on charges of sexual assault and false imprisonment of a woman in Santa Cruz in 2008. In March 2011 Virginia Governor Bob McDonnell announced that Virginia would begin using familial DNA searches.

At a press conference in Virginia on 7 March 2011, regarding the East Coast Rapist, Prince William County prosecutor Paul Ebert and Fairfax County Police Detective John Kelly said the case would have been solved years ago if Virginia had used familial DNA searching. Aaron Thomas, the suspected East Coast Rapist, was arrested in connection with the rape of 17 women from Virginia to Rhode Island, but familial DNA was not used in the case.

Critics of familial DNA database searches argue that the technique is an invasion of an individual's 4th Amendment rights. Privacy advocates are petitioning for DNA database restrictions, arguing that the only fair way to search for possible DNA matches to relatives of offenders or arrestees would be to have a population-wide DNA database. Some scholars have pointed out that the privacy concerns surrounding familial searching are similar in some respects to other police search techniques, and most have concluded that the practice is constitutional. The Ninth Circuit Court of Appeals in United States v. Pool (vacated as moot) suggested that this practice is somewhat analogous to a witness looking at a photograph of one person and stating that it looked like the perpetrator, which leads law enforcement to show the witness photos of similar looking individuals, one of whom is identified as the perpetrator.

Critics also state that racial profiling could occur on account of familial DNA testing. In the United States, the conviction rates of racial minorities are much higher than that of the overall population. It is unclear whether this is due to discrimination from police officers and the courts, as opposed to a simple higher rate of offence among minorities. Arrest-based databases, which are found in the majority of the United States, lead to an even greater level of racial discrimination. An arrest, as opposed to conviction, relies much more heavily on police discretion.

For instance, investigators with Denver District Attorney's Office successfully identified a suspect in a property theft case using a familial DNA search. In this example, the suspect's blood left at the scene of the crime strongly resembled that of a current Colorado Department of Corrections prisoner.

=== Partial matches ===
Partial DNA matches are the result of moderate stringency CODIS searches that produce a potential match that shares at least one allele at every locus. Partial matching does not involve the use of familial search software, such as those used in the United Kingdom and the United States, or additional Y-STR analysis and therefore often misses sibling relationships. Partial matching has been used to identify suspects in several cases in both countries and has also been used as a tool to exonerate the falsely accused. Darryl Hunt was wrongly convicted in connection with the rape and the murder of a young woman in 1984 in North Carolina.

=== Surreptitious DNA collecting ===
Police forces may collect DNA samples without a suspect's knowledge, and use it as evidence. The legality of the practice has been questioned in Australia.

In the United States, where it has been accepted, courts often rule that there is no expectation of privacy and cite California v. Greenwood (1988), in which the Supreme Court held that the Fourth Amendment does not prohibit the warrantless search and seizure of garbage left for collection outside the curtilage of a home. Critics of this practice underline that this analogy ignores that "most people have no idea that they risk surrendering their genetic identity to the police by, for instance, failing to destroy a used coffee cup. Moreover, even if they do realize it, there is no way to avoid abandoning one's DNA in public."

The United States Supreme Court ruled in Maryland v. King (2013) that DNA sampling of prisoners arrested for serious crimes is constitutional.

In the United Kingdom, the Human Tissue Act 2004 prohibits private individuals from covertly collecting biological samples (hair, fingernails, etc.) for DNA analysis but exempts medical and criminal investigations from the prohibition.

=== England and Wales ===
Evidence from an expert who has compared DNA samples must be accompanied by evidence as to the sources of the samples and the procedures for obtaining the DNA profiles. The judge must ensure that the jury understand the significance of DNA matches and mismatches in the profiles. The judge must also ensure that the jury does not confuse the match probability (the probability that a person that is chosen at random has a matching DNA profile to the sample from the scene) with the probability that a person with matching DNA committed the crime. In 1996 R v. Doheny

Juries should weigh up conflicting and corroborative evidence, using their own common sense and not by using mathematical formulae, such as Bayes' theorem, so as to avoid "confusion, misunderstanding and misjudgment".

==== Presentation and evaluation of evidence of partial or incomplete DNA profiles ====
In R v Bates, Moore-Bick LJ said:

We can see no reason why partial profile DNA evidence should not be admissible provided that the jury are made aware of its inherent limitations and are given a sufficient explanation to enable them to evaluate it. There may be cases where the match probability in relation to all the samples tested is so great that the judge would consider its probative value to be minimal and decide to exclude the evidence in the exercise of his discretion, but this gives rise to no new question of principle and can be left for decision on a case by case basis. However, the fact that there exists in the case of all partial profile evidence the possibility that a "missing" allele might exculpate the accused altogether does not provide sufficient grounds for rejecting such evidence. In many there is a possibility (at least in theory) that evidence that would assist the accused and perhaps even exculpate him altogether exists, but that does not provide grounds for excluding relevant evidence that is available and otherwise admissible, though it does make it important to ensure that the jury are given sufficient information to enable them to evaluate that evidence properly.

=== DNA testing in the United States ===
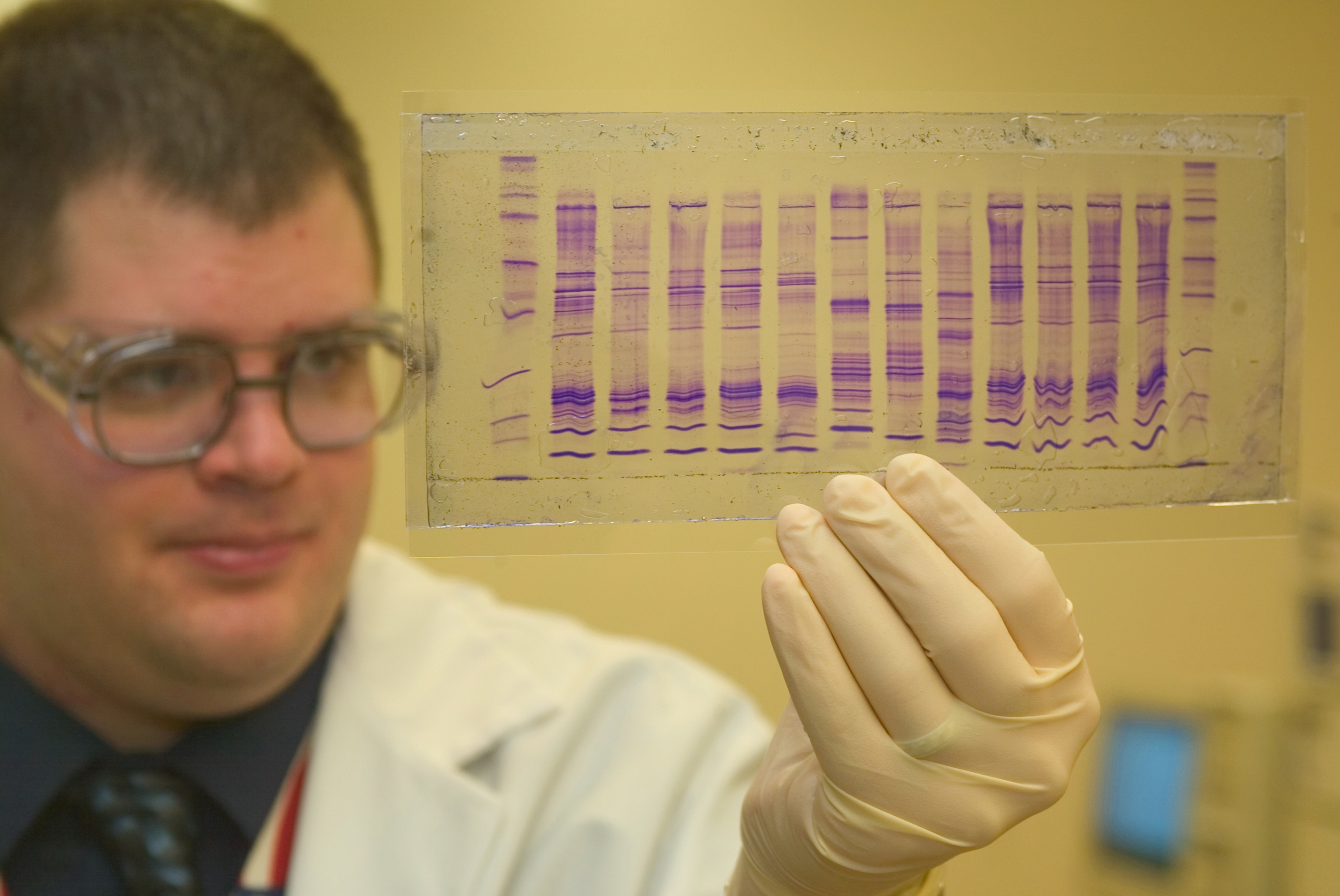
CBP chemist reads a DNA profile to determine the origin of a commodity.

There are state laws on DNA profiling in all 50 states of the United States. Detailed information on database laws in each state can be found at the National Conference of State Legislatures website.

=== Development of artificial DNA ===
In August 2009, scientists in Israel raised serious doubts concerning the use of DNA by law enforcement as the ultimate method of identification. In a paper published in the journal Forensic Science International: Genetics, the Israeli researchers demonstrated that it is possible to manufacture DNA in a laboratory, thus falsifying DNA evidence. The scientists fabricated saliva and blood samples, which originally contained DNA from a person other than the supposed donor of the blood and saliva.

The researchers also showed that, using a DNA database, it is possible to take information from a profile and manufacture DNA to match it, and that this can be done without access to any actual DNA from the person whose DNA they are duplicating. The synthetic DNA oligos required for the procedure are common in molecular laboratories.

The New York Times quoted the lead author, Daniel Frumkin, saying, "You can just engineer a crime scene ... any biology undergraduate could perform this". Frumkin perfected a test that can differentiate real DNA samples from fake ones. His test detects epigenetic modifications, in particular, DNA methylation. Seventy percent of the DNA in any human genome is methylated, meaning it contains methyl group modifications within a CpG dinucleotide context. Methylation at the promoter region is associated with gene silencing. The synthetic DNA lacks this epigenetic modification, which allows the test to distinguish manufactured DNA from genuine DNA.

It is unknown how many police departments, if any, currently use the test. No police lab has publicly announced that it is using the new test to verify DNA results.

Researchers at the University of Tokyo integrated an artificial DNA replication scheme with a rebuilt gene expression system and micro-compartmentalization utilizing cell-free materials alone for the first time. Multiple cycles of serial dilution were performed on a system contained in microscale water-in-oil droplets.

Chances of making DNA change on purpose

This study's artificial genomic DNA, which replicated using self-encoded proteins and evolved its sequence autonomously, provides a basis for developing complex artificial cells. Integrating genes required for transcription and translation into artificial genomic DNA could allow artificial cells to grow when supplied with small molecules such as amino acids and nucleotides. Such artificial cells could offer controlled conditions for producing substances like pharmaceuticals and food.

On 7 July 2008, the American chemical society reported that Japanese chemists have created the world's first DNA molecule comprised nearly completely of synthetic components.

A nano-particle based artificial transcription factor for gene regulation:

Nano Script is a nanoparticle-based artificial transcription factor that is supposed to replicate the structure and function of TFs. On gold nanoparticles, functional peptides and tiny molecules referred to as synthetic transcription factors, which imitate the various TF domains, were attached to create Nano Script. We show that Nano Script localizes to the nucleus and begins transcription of a reporter plasmid by an amount more than 15-fold. Moreover, Nano Script can successfully transcribe targeted genes onto endogenous DNA in a nonviral manner.

Three different fluorophores—red, green, and blue—were carefully fixed on the DNA rod surface to provide spatial information and create a nanoscale barcode. Epifluorescence and total internal reflection fluorescence microscopy reliably deciphered spatial information between fluorophores. By moving the three fluorophores on the DNA rod, this nanoscale barcode created 216 fluorescence patterns.

=== Cases ===
- In 1986, Richard Buckland was exonerated, despite having admitted to the rape and murder of a teenager near Leicester, the city where DNA profiling was first developed. This was the first use of DNA fingerprinting in a criminal investigation, and the first to prove a suspect's innocence. The following year Colin Pitchfork was identified as the perpetrator of the same murder, in addition to another, using the same techniques that had cleared Buckland.
- In 1987, genetic fingerprinting was used in a US criminal court for the first time in the trial of a man accused of unlawful intercourse with a mentally disabled 14-year-old female who gave birth to a baby.
- In 1987, Florida rapist Tommie Lee Andrews was the first person in the United States to be convicted as a result of DNA evidence, for raping a woman during a burglary; he was convicted on 6 November 1987, and sentenced to 22 years in prison.
- In 1990, a violent murder of a young student in Brno was the first criminal case in Czechoslovakia solved by DNA evidence, with the murderer sentenced to 23 years in prison.
- In 1992, DNA from a palo verde tree was used to convict Mark Alan Bogan of murder. DNA from seed pods of a tree at the crime scene was found to match that of seed pods found in Bogan's truck. This is the first instance of plant DNA admitted in a criminal case.
- In 1994, the claim that Anna Anderson was Grand Duchess Anastasia Nikolaevna of Russia was tested after her death using samples of her tissue that had been stored at a Charlottesville hospital following a medical procedure. The tissue was tested using DNA fingerprinting, and showed that she bore no relation to the Romanovs.
- In 1994, Earl Washington, Jr., of Virginia had his death sentence commuted to life imprisonment a week before his scheduled execution date based on DNA evidence. He received a full pardon in 2000 based on more advanced testing.
- In 1999, Raymond Easton, a disabled man from Swindon, England, was arrested and detained for seven hours in connection with a burglary, because the on-site DNA seemed to match his. He was released when a more accurate test showed clear differences. His DNA had been retained on file after an unrelated domestic incident some time previously.
- In 2000 Frank Lee Smith was proved innocent by DNA profiling of the murder of an eight-year-old girl after spending 14 years on death row in Florida, USA. However he had died of cancer just before his innocence was proven. In view of this the Florida state governor ordered that in future any death row inmate claiming innocence should have DNA testing.
- In May 2000 Gordon Graham murdered Paul Gault at his home in Lisburn, Northern Ireland. Graham was convicted of the murder when his DNA was found on a sports bag left in the house as part of an elaborate ploy to suggest the murder occurred after a burglary had gone wrong. Graham was having an affair with the victim's wife at the time of the murder. It was the first time Low Copy Number DNA was used in Northern Ireland.
- In 2001, Wayne Butler was convicted for the murder of Celia Douty. It was the first murder in Australia to be solved using DNA profiling.
- In 2002, the body of James Hanratty, hanged in 1962 for the "A6 murder", was exhumed and DNA samples from the body and members of his family were analysed. The results convinced Court of Appeal judges that Hanratty's guilt, which had been strenuously disputed by campaigners, was proved "beyond doubt". Paul Foot and some other campaigners continued to believe in Hanratty's innocence and argued that the DNA evidence could have been contaminated, noting that the small DNA samples from items of clothing, kept in a police laboratory for over 40 years "in conditions that do not satisfy modern evidential standards", had had to be subjected to very new amplification techniques in order to yield any genetic profile. However, no DNA other than Hanratty's was found on the evidence tested, contrary to what would have been expected had the evidence indeed been contaminated.
- In August 2002, Annalisa Vicentini was shot dead in Tuscany. Bartender Peter Hamkin, 23, was arrested, in Merseyside in March 2003 on an extradition warrant heard at Bow Street Magistrates' Court in London to establish whether he should be taken to Italy to face a murder charge. DNA "proved" he shot her, but he was cleared on other evidence.
- In 2003, Welshman Jeffrey Gafoor was convicted of the 1988 murder of Lynette White, when crime scene evidence collected 12 years earlier was re-examined using STR techniques, resulting in a match with his nephew.
- In June 2003, because of new DNA evidence, Dennis Halstead, John Kogut and John Restivo won a re-trial on their 1986 murder conviction, their convictions were struck down and they were released.
- In 2004, DNA testing shed new light into the mysterious 1912 disappearance of Bobby Dunbar, a four-year-old boy who vanished during a fishing trip. He was allegedly found alive eight months later in the custody of William Cantwell Walters, but another woman claimed that the boy was her son, Bruce Anderson, whom she had entrusted in Walters' custody. The courts disbelieved her claim and convicted Walters for the kidnapping. The boy was raised and known as Bobby Dunbar throughout the rest of his life. However, DNA tests on Dunbar's son and nephew revealed the two were not related, thus establishing that the boy found in 1912 was not Bobby Dunbar, whose real fate remains unknown.
- In 2005, Gary Leiterman was convicted of the 1969 murder of Jane Mixer, a law student at the University of Michigan, after DNA found on Mixer's pantyhose was matched to Leiterman. DNA in a drop of blood on Mixer's hand was matched to John Ruelas, who was only four years old in 1969 and was never successfully connected to the case in any other way. Leiterman's defense unsuccessfully argued that the unexplained match of the blood spot to Ruelas pointed to cross-contamination and raised doubts about the reliability of the lab's identification of Leiterman.
- In November 2008, Anthony Curcio was arrested for masterminding one of the most elaborately planned armored car heists in history. DNA evidence linked Curcio to the crime.
- In March 2009, Sean Hodgson—convicted of 1979 killing of Teresa De Simone, 22, in her car in Southampton—was released after tests proved DNA from the scene was not his. It was later matched to DNA retrieved from the exhumed body of David Lace. Lace had previously confessed to the crime but was not believed by the detectives. He served time in prison for other crimes committed at the same time as the murder and then committed suicide in 1988.
- In 2012, a case of babies being switched, many decades earlier, was discovered by accident. After undertaking DNA testing for other purposes, Alice Collins Plebuch was advised that her ancestry appeared to include a significant Ashkenazi Jewish component, despite a belief in her family that they were of predominantly Irish descent. Profiling of Plebuch's genome suggested that it included distinct and unexpected components associated with Ashkenazi, Middle Eastern, and Eastern European populations. This led Plebuch to conduct an extensive investigation, after which she concluded that her father had been switched (possibly accidentally) with another baby soon after birth. Plebuch was also able to identify the biological ancestors of her father.
- In 2015, in X and Anor v Z (Children) and Anor the Court of Appeal for England and Wales decided that it is not lawful for a DNA profile made by the police in the course of a criminal investigation to be used for a paternity test.
- In 2016 Anthea Ring, abandoned as a baby, was able to use a DNA sample and DNA matching database to discover her deceased mother's identity and roots in County Mayo, Ireland. A recently developed forensic test was subsequently used to capture DNA from saliva left on old stamps and envelopes by her suspected father, uncovered through painstaking genealogy research. The DNA in the first three samples was too degraded to use. However, on the fourth, more than enough DNA was found. The test, which has a degree of accuracy acceptable in UK courts, proved that a man named Patrick Coyne was her biological father.
- In 2018 the Buckskin girl (a body found in 1981 in Ohio) was identified as Marcia King from Arkansas using DNA genealogical techniques
- In 2018 Joseph James DeAngelo was arrested as the main suspect for the Golden State Killer using DNA and genealogy techniques.
- In 2018, William Earl Talbott II was arrested as a suspect for the 1987 murders of Jay Cook and Tanya Van Cuylenborg with the assistance of genealogical DNA testing. The same genetic genealogist that helped in this case also helped police with 18 other arrests in 2018.
- In 2018, with the use of Next Generation Identification System's enhanced biometric capabilities, the FBI matched the fingerprint of a suspect named Timothy David Nelson and arrested him 20 years after the alleged sexual assault.

== DNA evidence as evidence to prove rights of succession to British titles ==
DNA testing has been used to establish the right of succession to British titles.

Cases:

- Baron Moynihan
- Pringle baronets

== See also ==
- Forensic identification
- Full genome sequencing
- Gene mapping
- Harvey v. Horan
- Identification (biology)
- Project Innocence
- Ribotyping
- International Society for Forensic Genetics
- International Society of Genetic Genealogy
- Satellite DNA
