= List of MeSH codes (F02) =

The following is a partial list of the "F" codes for Medical Subject Headings (MeSH), as defined by the United States National Library of Medicine (NLM).

This list continues the information at List of MeSH codes (F01). Codes following these are found at List of MeSH codes (F03). For other MeSH codes, see List of MeSH codes.

The source for this content is the set of 2006 MeSH Trees from the NLM.

== MeSH F02 – psychological phenomena and processes ==
=== MeSH F02.463 – mental processes ===
- MeSH F02.463.188 – cognition
- MeSH F02.463.188.150 – awareness
- MeSH F02.463.188.305 – cognitive dissonance
- MeSH F02.463.188.357 – comprehension (understanding)
- MeSH F02.463.188.409 – consciousness
- MeSH F02.463.188.634 – imagination
- MeSH F02.463.188.634.309 – dreams
- MeSH F02.463.188.634.507 – fantasy
- MeSH F02.463.188.675 – intuition
- MeSH F02.463.306 – intention
- MeSH F02.463.425 – learning
- MeSH F02.463.425.069 – association
- MeSH F02.463.425.069.296 – association learning
- MeSH F02.463.425.097 – avoidance learning
- MeSH F02.463.425.179 – conditioning (psychology): classical conditioning; operant conditioning; eyeblink conditioning
- MeSH F02.463.425.179.149 – automatic behavior
- MeSH F02.463.425.179.308 – conditioning, classical
- MeSH F02.463.425.179.408 – conditioning, eyelid
- MeSH F02.463.425.179.509 – conditioning, operant
- MeSH F02.463.425.209 – critical period (psychology)
- MeSH F02.463.425.234 – cues
- MeSH F02.463.425.280 – discrimination learning
- MeSH F02.463.425.357 – generalization (psychology)
- MeSH F02.463.425.357.359 – generalization, response
- MeSH F02.463.425.357.526 – generalization, stimulus
- MeSH F02.463.425.393 – habituation (psychophysiology)
- MeSH F02.463.425.420 – helplessness, learned
- MeSH F02.463.425.448 – imprinting (psychology)
- MeSH F02.463.425.475 – inhibition (psychology)
- MeSH F02.463.425.475.538 – proactive inhibition
- MeSH F02.463.425.475.724 – reactive inhibition
- MeSH F02.463.425.507 – maze learning
- MeSH F02.463.425.540 – memory
- MeSH F02.463.425.540.203 – deja vu
- MeSH F02.463.425.540.407 – memory, short-term
- MeSH F02.463.425.540.641 – mental recall
- MeSH F02.463.425.540.706 – recognition (psychology)
- MeSH F02.463.425.540.772 – retention (psychology)
- MeSH F02.463.425.575 – neurolinguistic programming
- MeSH F02.463.425.612 – overlearning
- MeSH F02.463.425.674 – practice (psychology)
- MeSH F02.463.425.701 – probability learning
- MeSH F02.463.425.720 – problem-based learning
- MeSH F02.463.425.725 – problem solving
- MeSH F02.463.425.770 – reinforcement (psychology)
- MeSH F02.463.425.770.232 – extinction (psychology)
- MeSH F02.463.425.770.379 – knowledge of results (psychology)
- MeSH F02.463.425.770.571 – punishment
- MeSH F02.463.425.770.644 – reinforcement schedule
- MeSH F02.463.425.770.706 – reinforcement, social
- MeSH F02.463.425.770.769 – reinforcement, verbal
- MeSH F02.463.425.770.836 – reward
- MeSH F02.463.425.770.836.500 – token economy
- MeSH F02.463.425.798 – reversal learning
- MeSH F02.463.425.838 – set (psychology)
- MeSH F02.463.425.910 – transfer (psychology)
- MeSH F02.463.425.952 – verbal learning
- MeSH F02.463.425.952.500 – paired-associate learning
- MeSH F02.463.425.952.747 – serial learning
- MeSH F02.463.467 – mental fatigue
- MeSH F02.463.509 – mind-body relations (metaphysics)
- MeSH F02.463.593 – perception
- MeSH F02.463.593.071 – auditory perception
- MeSH F02.463.593.071.173 – auditory threshold
- MeSH F02.463.593.071.173.095 – auditory fatigue
- MeSH F02.463.593.071.576 – loudness perception
- MeSH F02.463.593.071.594 – perceptual masking
- MeSH F02.463.593.071.700 – pitch perception
- MeSH F02.463.593.071.700.408 – pitch discrimination
- MeSH F02.463.593.071.869 – sound localization
- MeSH F02.463.593.071.875 – speech perception
- MeSH F02.463.593.112 – body image
- MeSH F02.463.593.200 – depth perception
- MeSH F02.463.593.200.390 – distance perception
- MeSH F02.463.593.230 – differential threshold
- MeSH F02.463.593.257 – discrimination (psychology)
- MeSH F02.463.593.257.800 – signal detection (psychology)
- MeSH F02.463.593.292 – eidetic imagery
- MeSH F02.463.593.343 – field dependence-independence
- MeSH F02.463.593.373 – form perception
- MeSH F02.463.593.373.765 – stereognosis
- MeSH F02.463.593.409 – gravity perception
- MeSH F02.463.593.446 – illusions
- MeSH F02.463.593.446.659 – optical illusions
- MeSH F02.463.593.524 – pattern recognition, physiological
- MeSH F02.463.593.524.500 – pattern recognition, visual
- MeSH F02.463.593.603 – perceptual distortion
- MeSH F02.463.593.696 – sensory deprivation
- MeSH F02.463.593.710 – sensory thresholds
- MeSH F02.463.593.710.190 – auditory threshold
- MeSH F02.463.593.710.370 – differential threshold
- MeSH F02.463.593.710.560 – pain threshold
- MeSH F02.463.593.710.725 – signal detection (psychology)
- MeSH F02.463.593.710.750 – subliminal stimulation
- MeSH F02.463.593.710.790 – taste threshold
- MeSH F02.463.593.725 – size perception
- MeSH F02.463.593.752 – social perception
- MeSH F02.463.593.778 – space perception
- MeSH F02.463.593.857 – time perception
- MeSH F02.463.593.885 – touch
- MeSH F02.463.593.885.682 – stereognosis
- MeSH F02.463.593.932 – visual perception
- MeSH F02.463.593.932.073 – afterimage
- MeSH F02.463.593.932.217 – color perception
- MeSH F02.463.593.932.345 – field dependence-independence
- MeSH F02.463.593.932.401 – figural aftereffect
- MeSH F02.463.593.932.458 – flicker fusion
- MeSH F02.463.593.932.567 – motion perception
- MeSH F02.463.593.932.622 – pattern recognition, visual
- MeSH F02.463.593.932.677 – perceptual closure
- MeSH F02.463.593.932.733 – perceptual masking
- MeSH F02.463.593.932.869 – space perception
- MeSH F02.463.593.932.869.255 – depth perception
- MeSH F02.463.593.932.869.255.390 – distance perception
- MeSH F02.463.593.932.869.255.780 – vision disparity
- MeSH F02.463.593.932.869.435 – form perception
- MeSH F02.463.593.932.869.435.110 – contrast sensitivity
- MeSH F02.463.593.932.869.435.673 – pattern recognition, visual
- MeSH F02.463.593.932.869.794 – size perception
- MeSH F02.463.593.959 – weight perception
- MeSH F02.463.785 – thinking
- MeSH F02.463.785.233 – concept formation
- MeSH F02.463.785.302 – creativeness
- MeSH F02.463.785.373 – decision making
- MeSH F02.463.785.373.346 – choice behavior
- MeSH F02.463.785.373.346.400 – career choice
- MeSH F02.463.785.373.433 – consensus
- MeSH F02.463.785.373.476 – dissent and disputes
- MeSH F02.463.785.373.476.850 – refusal to participate
- MeSH F02.463.785.373.520 – negotiating
- MeSH F02.463.785.373.820 – uncertainty
- MeSH F02.463.785.477 – esthetics
- MeSH F02.463.785.477.304 – beauty
- MeSH F02.463.785.626 – judgment
- MeSH F02.463.785.810 – problem solving
- MeSH F02.463.902 – volition

=== MeSH F02.607 – parapsychology ===
- MeSH F02.607.847 – telepathy

=== MeSH F02.694 – psycholinguistics ===
- MeSH F02.694.550 – neurolinguistic programming
- MeSH F02.694.663 – semantic differential

=== MeSH F02.739 – psychological theory ===
- MeSH F02.739.138 – behaviorism
- MeSH F02.739.418 – existentialism
- MeSH F02.739.527 – gestalt theory
- MeSH F02.739.660 – personal construct theory
- MeSH F02.739.794 – psychoanalytic theory
- MeSH F02.739.794.206 – ego
- MeSH F02.739.794.206.508 – reality testing
- MeSH F02.739.794.253 – extraversion (psychology)
- MeSH F02.739.794.297 – freudian theory
- MeSH F02.739.794.371 – id
- MeSH F02.739.794.405 – inhibition (psychology)
- MeSH F02.739.794.438 – introversion (psychology)
- MeSH F02.739.794.471 – jungian theory
- MeSH F02.739.794.511 – libido
- MeSH F02.739.794.582 – narcissism
- MeSH F02.739.794.624 – object attachment
- MeSH F02.739.794.624.120 – bonding, human-pet
- MeSH F02.739.794.653 – oedipus complex
- MeSH F02.739.794.746 – pleasure-pain principle
- MeSH F02.739.794.793 – psychosexual development
- MeSH F02.739.794.793.200 – gender identity
- MeSH F02.739.794.793.458 – latency period (psychology)
- MeSH F02.739.794.793.626 – oral stage
- MeSH F02.739.794.837 – self psychology
- MeSH F02.739.794.881 – superego
- MeSH F02.739.794.942 – unconscious (psychology)

=== MeSH F02.784 – psychology, applied ===
- MeSH F02.784.176 – counseling
- MeSH F02.784.176.279 – directive counseling
- MeSH F02.784.176.560 – pastoral care
- MeSH F02.784.176.700 – sex counseling
- MeSH F02.784.240 – criminal psychology
- MeSH F02.784.240.514 – lie detection
- MeSH F02.784.412 – human engineering
- MeSH F02.784.412.221 – data display
- MeSH F02.784.412.575 – man-machine systems
- MeSH F02.784.412.846 – task performance and analysis
- MeSH F02.784.412.846.707 – time and motion studies
- MeSH F02.784.412.846.853 – work simplification
- MeSH F02.784.412.923 – time management
- MeSH F02.784.629 – psychology, educational
- MeSH F02.784.629.054 – achievement
- MeSH F02.784.629.131 – aptitude
- MeSH F02.784.629.155 – aspirations (psychology)
- MeSH F02.784.629.228 – child, exceptional
- MeSH F02.784.629.228.350 – child, gifted
- MeSH F02.784.629.272 – child guidance
- MeSH F02.784.629.375 – education of mentally retarded
- MeSH F02.784.629.529 – learning
- MeSH F02.784.629.529.550 – neurolinguistic programming
- MeSH F02.784.629.709 – remedial teaching
- MeSH F02.784.629.796 – student dropouts
- MeSH F02.784.629.880 – underachievement
- MeSH F02.784.629.937 – vocational guidance
- MeSH F02.784.692 – psychology, industrial
- MeSH F02.784.692.107 – absenteeism
- MeSH F02.784.692.351 – efficiency
- MeSH F02.784.692.425 – job satisfaction
- MeSH F02.784.692.746 – task performance and analysis
- MeSH F02.784.692.746.707 – time and motion studies
- MeSH F02.784.692.746.853 – work simplification
- MeSH F02.784.692.816 – time management
- MeSH F02.784.692.887 – vocational guidance
- MeSH F02.784.754 – psychology, military

=== MeSH F02.808 – psychomotor performance ===
- MeSH F02.808.260 – motor skills
- MeSH F02.808.600 – task performance and analysis

=== MeSH F02.830 – psychophysiology ===
- MeSH F02.830.071 – appetite
- MeSH F02.830.104 – arousal
- MeSH F02.830.104.214 – attention
- MeSH F02.830.104.821 – wakefulness
- MeSH F02.830.120 – biofeedback (psychology)
- MeSH F02.830.158 – blushing
- MeSH F02.830.233 – consciousness
- MeSH F02.830.297 – dominance, cerebral
- MeSH F02.830.297.425 – laterality
- MeSH F02.830.422 – habituation (psychophysiology)
- MeSH F02.830.512 – lie detection
- MeSH F02.830.606 – orientation
- MeSH F02.830.606.587 – kinesis
- MeSH F02.830.650 – reaction time
- MeSH F02.830.650.400 – refractory period, psychological
- MeSH F02.830.702 – reflex
- MeSH F02.830.702.315 – galvanic skin response
- MeSH F02.830.702.607 – piloerection
- MeSH F02.830.702.807 – startle reaction
- MeSH F02.830.749 – satiation
- MeSH F02.830.749.658 – satiety response
- MeSH F02.830.784 – self stimulation
- MeSH F02.830.816 – sensation
- MeSH F02.830.816.263 – hearing
- MeSH F02.830.816.444 – pain
- MeSH F02.830.816.444.350 – arthralgia
- MeSH F02.830.816.444.700 – pain threshold
- MeSH F02.830.816.541 – proprioception
- MeSH F02.830.816.541.504 – kinesthesis
- MeSH F02.830.816.643 – smell
- MeSH F02.830.816.724 – taste
- MeSH F02.830.816.781 – temperature sense
- MeSH F02.830.816.850 – touch
- MeSH F02.830.816.929 – vision
- MeSH F02.830.816.929.300 – phosphenes
- MeSH F02.830.816.929.800 – vision, entoptic
- MeSH F02.830.855 – sleep
- MeSH F02.830.855.268 – dreams
- MeSH F02.830.855.671 – sleep deprivation
- MeSH F02.830.855.796 – sleep stages
- MeSH F02.830.855.796.671 – sleep, rem
- MeSH F02.830.900 – stress, psychological
- MeSH F02.830.900.110 – burnout, professional

=== MeSH F02.880 – religion and psychology ===
- MeSH F02.880.410 – pastoral care
- MeSH F02.880.705 – spirituality

The list continues at List of MeSH codes (F03).
