= List of MeSH codes (G04) =

The following is a partial list of the "G" codes for Medical Subject Headings (MeSH), as defined by the United States National Library of Medicine (NLM).

This list continues the information at List of MeSH codes (G03). Codes following these are found at List of MeSH codes (G05). For other MeSH codes, see List of MeSH codes.

The source for this content is the set of 2006 MeSH Trees from the NLM.

== MeSH G04 – biological phenomena, cell phenomena, and immunity ==
=== MeSH G04.185 – biological phenomena ===
==== MeSH G04.185.057 – adaptation, biological ====
- MeSH G04.185.057.500 – adaptation, physiological
- MeSH G04.185.057.500.133 – acclimatization
- MeSH G04.185.057.500.415 – estivation
- MeSH G04.185.057.500.592 – hibernation

==== MeSH G04.185.349 – evolution ====
- MeSH G04.185.349.250 – evolution, molecular
- MeSH G04.185.349.350 – genetic speciation
- MeSH G04.185.349.605 – phylogeny

==== MeSH G04.185.515 – microbiologic phenomena ====
- MeSH G04.185.515.070 – antibiosis
- MeSH G04.185.515.120 – bacterial physiology
- MeSH G04.185.515.120.100 – bacterial adhesion
- MeSH G04.185.515.120.105 – bacterial translocation
- MeSH G04.185.515.120.120 – bacteriolysis
- MeSH G04.185.515.120.600 – nitrogen fixation
- MeSH G04.185.515.286 – drug resistance, microbial
- MeSH G04.185.515.286.347 – drug resistance, bacterial
- MeSH G04.185.515.286.347.500 – beta-lactam resistance
- MeSH G04.185.515.286.347.500.175 – cephalosporin resistance
- MeSH G04.185.515.286.347.500.600 – penicillin resistance
- MeSH G04.185.515.286.347.500.600.050 – ampicillin resistance
- MeSH G04.185.515.286.347.500.600.525 – methicillin resistance
- MeSH G04.185.515.286.347.750 – chloramphenicol resistance
- MeSH G04.185.515.286.347.812 – drug resistance, multiple, bacterial
- MeSH G04.185.515.286.347.875 – kanamycin resistance
- MeSH G04.185.515.286.347.937 – tetracycline resistance
- MeSH G04.185.515.286.347.968 – trimethoprim resistance
- MeSH G04.185.515.286.347.984 – vancomycin resistance
- MeSH G04.185.515.286.383 – drug resistance, fungal
- MeSH G04.185.515.286.383.500 – drug resistance, multiple, fungal
- MeSH G04.185.515.286.420 – drug resistance, viral
- MeSH G04.185.515.286.420.500 – drug resistance, multiple, viral
- MeSH G04.185.515.329 – drug resistance, multiple
- MeSH G04.185.515.329.500 – drug resistance, multiple, bacterial
- MeSH G04.185.515.329.625 – drug resistance, multiple, fungal
- MeSH G04.185.515.329.750 – drug resistance, multiple, viral
- MeSH G04.185.515.372 – germ-free life
- MeSH G04.185.515.372.676 – specific pathogen-free organisms
- MeSH G04.185.515.423 – hemadsorption
- MeSH G04.185.515.620 – microbial viability
- MeSH G04.185.515.671 – nitrogen fixation
- MeSH G04.185.515.870 – transformation, bacterial
- MeSH G04.185.515.880 – viral physiology
- MeSH G04.185.515.880.040 – antibody-dependent enhancement
- MeSH G04.185.515.880.210 – cell transformation, viral
- MeSH G04.185.515.880.225 – cytopathogenic effect, viral
- MeSH G04.185.515.880.420 – hemagglutination, viral
- MeSH G04.185.515.880.450 – inclusion bodies, viral
- MeSH G04.185.515.880.910 – viral interference
- MeSH G04.185.515.880.926 – virus inactivation
- MeSH G04.185.515.880.930 – virus integration
- MeSH G04.185.515.880.930.500 – lysogeny
- MeSH G04.185.515.880.935 – virus latency
- MeSH G04.185.515.880.941 – virus replication
- MeSH G04.185.515.880.941.940 – virus activation
- MeSH G04.185.515.880.941.950 – virus assembly
- MeSH G04.185.515.880.960 – virus shedding
- MeSH G04.185.515.910 – virulence

==== MeSH G04.185.672 – pigmentation ====
- MeSH G04.185.672.360 – eye color
- MeSH G04.185.672.490 – hair color
- MeSH G04.185.672.890 – skin pigmentation

==== MeSH G04.185.753 – regeneration ====
- MeSH G04.185.753.150 – bone remodeling
- MeSH G04.185.753.150.150 – bone regeneration
- MeSH G04.185.753.150.150.570 – osseointegration
- MeSH G04.185.753.468 – liver regeneration
- MeSH G04.185.753.611 – nerve regeneration
- MeSH G04.185.753.891 – wound healing
- MeSH G04.185.753.891.500 – fracture healing

==== MeSH G04.185.800 – remission, spontaneous ====
- MeSH G04.185.800.500 – neoplasm regression, spontaneous

=== MeSH G04.335 – cell physiology ===
==== MeSH G04.335.119 – cell aging ====
- MeSH G04.335.119.260 – erythrocyte aging

==== MeSH G04.335.122 – cell communication ====
- MeSH G04.335.122.100 – autocrine communication
- MeSH G04.335.122.155 – bystander effect
- MeSH G04.335.122.300 – embryonic induction
- MeSH G04.335.122.600 – paracrine communication
- MeSH G04.335.122.850 – signal transduction
- MeSH G04.335.122.850.580 – mechanotransduction, cellular

==== MeSH G04.335.125 – cell compartmentation ====
- MeSH G04.335.125.180 – chromosome positioning

==== MeSH G04.335.130 – cell count ====
- MeSH G04.335.130.107 – blood cell count
- MeSH G04.335.130.107.330 – erythrocyte count
- MeSH G04.335.130.107.330.725 – reticulocyte count
- MeSH G04.335.130.107.595 – leukocyte count
- MeSH G04.335.130.107.595.500 – lymphocyte count
- MeSH G04.335.130.107.595.500.150 – cd4 lymphocyte count
- MeSH G04.335.130.107.595.500.150.160 – cd4-cd8 ratio
- MeSH G04.335.130.107.740 – platelet count
- MeSH G04.335.130.870 – sperm count

==== MeSH G04.335.134 – cell cycle ====
- MeSH G04.335.134.220 – cell division
- MeSH G04.335.134.220.220 – cell nucleus division
- MeSH G04.335.134.220.220.500 – anaphase
- MeSH G04.335.134.220.220.625 – chromosome segregation
- MeSH G04.335.134.220.220.687 – meiosis
- MeSH G04.335.134.220.220.687.444 – meiotic prophase i
- MeSH G04.335.134.220.220.687.444.299 – chromosome pairing
- MeSH G04.335.134.220.220.687.444.299.500 – synaptonemal complex
- MeSH G04.335.134.220.220.687.444.600 – pachytene stage
- MeSH G04.335.134.220.220.750 – metaphase
- MeSH G04.335.134.220.220.781 – mitosis
- MeSH G04.335.134.220.220.781.050 – anaphase
- MeSH G04.335.134.220.220.781.625 – metaphase
- MeSH G04.335.134.220.220.781.812 – prometaphase
- MeSH G04.335.134.220.220.781.906 – prophase
- MeSH G04.335.134.220.220.781.953 – telophase
- MeSH G04.335.134.220.220.812 – prometaphase
- MeSH G04.335.134.220.220.875 – prophase
- MeSH G04.335.134.220.220.875.500 – meiotic prophase i
- MeSH G04.335.134.220.220.875.500.299 – chromosome pairing
- MeSH G04.335.134.220.220.875.500.299.500 – synaptonemal complex
- MeSH G04.335.134.220.220.875.500.600 – pachytene stage
- MeSH G04.335.134.220.220.937 – telophase
- MeSH G04.335.134.220.250 – cytokinesis
- MeSH G04.335.134.500 – interphase
- MeSH G04.335.134.500.300 – g0 phase
- MeSH G04.335.134.500.320 – g1 phase
- MeSH G04.335.134.500.340 – g2 phase
- MeSH G04.335.134.500.800 – s phase

==== MeSH G04.335.139 – cell death ====
- MeSH G04.335.139.160 – apoptosis
- MeSH G04.335.139.160.060 – anoikis
- MeSH G04.335.139.160.200 – dna fragmentation
- MeSH G04.335.139.399 – autophagy
- MeSH G04.335.139.638 – necrosis

==== MeSH G04.335.151 – cell differentiation ====
- MeSH G04.335.151.149 – adipogenesis
- MeSH G04.335.151.300 – embryonic induction
- MeSH G04.335.151.650 – gametogenesis
- MeSH G04.335.151.650.249 – oogenesis
- MeSH G04.335.151.650.249.880 – vitellogenesis
- MeSH G04.335.151.650.624 – spermatogenesis
- MeSH G04.335.151.650.624.700 – sperm maturation
- MeSH G04.335.151.825 – hematopoiesis
- MeSH G04.335.151.825.414 – erythropoiesis
- MeSH G04.335.151.825.463 – hematopoiesis, extramedullary
- MeSH G04.335.151.825.597 – leukopoiesis
- MeSH G04.335.151.825.597.500 – lymphopoiesis
- MeSH G04.335.151.825.597.750 – myelopoiesis
- MeSH G04.335.151.825.798 – thrombopoiesis

==== MeSH G04.335.233 – cell growth processes ====
- MeSH G04.335.233.500 – cell enlargement
- MeSH G04.335.233.750 – cell proliferation
- MeSH G04.335.233.750.500 – cell division
- MeSH G04.335.233.750.500.220 – cell nucleus division
- MeSH G04.335.233.750.500.220.500 – anaphase
- MeSH G04.335.233.750.500.220.625 – chromosome segregation
- MeSH G04.335.233.750.500.220.718 – meiosis
- MeSH G04.335.233.750.500.220.718.500 – meiotic prophase i
- MeSH G04.335.233.750.500.220.718.500.299 – chromosome pairing
- MeSH G04.335.233.750.500.220.718.500.299.500 – synaptonemal complex
- MeSH G04.335.233.750.500.220.718.500.600 – pachytene stage
- MeSH G04.335.233.750.500.220.750 – metaphase
- MeSH G04.335.233.750.500.220.781 – mitosis
- MeSH G04.335.233.750.500.220.781.050 – anaphase
- MeSH G04.335.233.750.500.220.781.625 – metaphase
- MeSH G04.335.233.750.500.220.781.812 – prometaphase
- MeSH G04.335.233.750.500.220.781.906 – prophase
- MeSH G04.335.233.750.500.220.781.953 – telophase
- MeSH G04.335.233.750.500.220.812 – prometaphase
- MeSH G04.335.233.750.500.220.875 – prophase
- MeSH G04.335.233.750.500.220.875.500 – meiotic prophase i
- MeSH G04.335.233.750.500.220.875.500.299 – chromosome pairing
- MeSH G04.335.233.750.500.220.875.500.299.500 – synaptonemal complex
- MeSH G04.335.233.750.500.220.875.500.600 – pachytene stage
- MeSH G04.335.233.750.500.220.937 – telophase
- MeSH G04.335.233.750.500.250 – cytokinesis

==== MeSH G04.335.283 – cell movement ====
- MeSH G04.335.283.251 – cell aggregation
- MeSH G04.335.283.424 – chemotaxis
- MeSH G04.335.283.424.233 – chemotaxis, leukocyte
- MeSH G04.335.283.424.233.500 – leukocyte rolling
- MeSH G04.335.283.700 – ovum transport
- MeSH G04.335.283.750 – sperm motility
- MeSH G04.335.283.800 – sperm transport

==== MeSH G04.335.305 – cell respiration ====
- MeSH G04.335.305.300 – cell hypoxia
- MeSH G04.335.305.620 – respiratory burst

==== MeSH G04.335.418 – cytoplasmic streaming ====
- MeSH G04.335.418.040 – axonal transport

==== MeSH G04.335.452 – dna packaging ====
- MeSH G04.335.452.095 – chromatin assembly and disassembly

==== MeSH G04.335.487 – endocytosis ====
- MeSH G04.335.487.350 – phagocytosis
- MeSH G04.335.487.350.091 – autophagy
- MeSH G04.335.487.370 – pinocytosis

==== MeSH G04.335.532 – exocytosis ====
- MeSH G04.335.532.160 – cell degranulation

==== MeSH G04.335.857 – receptor aggregation ====
- MeSH G04.335.857.612 – immunologic capping

==== MeSH G04.335.880 – signal transduction ====
- MeSH G04.335.880.400 – ion channel gating
- MeSH G04.335.880.560 – map kinase signaling system
- MeSH G04.335.880.580 – mechanotransduction, cellular
- MeSH G04.335.880.700 – phototransduction
- MeSH G04.335.880.800 – second messenger systems
- MeSH G04.335.880.800.100 – calcium signaling
- MeSH G04.335.880.850 – synaptic transmission

=== MeSH G04.610 – immunity ===
==== MeSH G04.610.106 – antibody specificity ====
- MeSH G04.610.106.493 – organ specificity
- MeSH G04.610.106.759 – species specificity

==== MeSH G04.610.143 – antigen-antibody reactions ====
- MeSH G04.610.143.100 – agglutination
- MeSH G04.610.143.100.200 – hemagglutination
- MeSH G04.610.143.100.700 – sperm agglutination
- MeSH G04.610.143.125 – antibody affinity
- MeSH G04.610.143.140 – antigenic modulation
- MeSH G04.610.143.232 – binding sites, antibody
- MeSH G04.610.143.281 – cross reactions
- MeSH G04.610.143.545 – hemolysis
- MeSH G04.610.143.612 – immunologic capping
- MeSH G04.610.143.754 – passive cutaneous anaphylaxis
- MeSH G04.610.143.780 – rh isoimmunization

==== MeSH G04.610.255 – complement activation ====
- MeSH G04.610.255.695 – complement pathway, alternative
- MeSH G04.610.255.698 – complement pathway, classical
- MeSH G04.610.255.849 – complement pathway, mannose-binding lectin

==== MeSH G04.610.270 – cytotoxicity, immunologic ====
- MeSH G04.610.270.070 – antibody-dependent cell cytotoxicity
- MeSH G04.610.270.500 – macrophage activation

==== MeSH G04.610.484 – immune tolerance ====
- MeSH G04.610.484.100 – clonal anergy
- MeSH G04.610.484.120 – clonal deletion
- MeSH G04.610.484.800 – self tolerance
- MeSH G04.610.484.910 – tachyphylaxis
- MeSH G04.610.484.955 – transplantation tolerance

==== MeSH G04.610.555 – immunity, cellular ====
- MeSH G04.610.555.070 – antigen presentation
- MeSH G04.610.555.412 – immunologic surveillance
- MeSH G04.610.555.545 – lymphocyte activation
- MeSH G04.610.555.545.150 – cross-priming
- MeSH G04.610.555.714 – transplantation immunology
- MeSH G04.610.555.714.402 – graft vs host reaction
- MeSH G04.610.555.714.402.320 – graft vs tumor effect
- MeSH G04.610.555.714.402.320.320 – graft vs leukemia effect
- MeSH G04.610.555.714.519 – histocompatibility
- MeSH G04.610.555.714.545 – host vs graft reaction
- MeSH G04.610.555.714.545.328 – graft rejection
- MeSH G04.610.555.714.545.340 – graft survival

==== MeSH G04.610.575 – immunity, natural ====
- MeSH G04.610.575.204 – blood bactericidal activity
- MeSH G04.610.575.809 – phagocytosis

==== MeSH G04.610.619 – immunocompromised host ====
- MeSH G04.610.619.500 – radiation chimera

==== MeSH G04.610.626 – immunogenetics ====
- MeSH G04.610.626.051 – antibody diversity
- MeSH G04.610.626.073 – antigenic variation
- MeSH G04.610.626.320 – gene rearrangement, b-lymphocyte
- MeSH G04.610.626.320.501 – gene rearrangement, b-lymphocyte, heavy chain
- MeSH G04.610.626.320.501.450 – immunoglobulin class switching
- MeSH G04.610.626.320.601 – gene rearrangement, b-lymphocyte, light chain
- MeSH G04.610.626.325 – gene rearrangement, t-lymphocyte
- MeSH G04.610.626.325.111 – gene rearrangement, alpha-chain t-cell antigen receptor
- MeSH G04.610.626.325.211 – gene rearrangement, beta-chain t-cell antigen receptor
- MeSH G04.610.626.325.261 – gene rearrangement, delta-chain t-cell antigen receptor
- MeSH G04.610.626.325.311 – gene rearrangement, gamma-chain t-cell antigen receptor
- MeSH G04.610.626.398 – genes, immunoglobulin
- MeSH G04.610.626.454 – immunoglobulin allotypes
- MeSH G04.610.626.454.586 – immunoglobulin gm allotypes
- MeSH G04.610.626.454.587 – immunoglobulin km allotypes
- MeSH G04.610.626.510 – immunoglobulin idiotypes
- MeSH G04.610.626.580 – major histocompatibility complex
- MeSH G04.610.626.580.595 – genes, mhc class i
- MeSH G04.610.626.580.600 – genes, mhc class ii
- MeSH G04.610.626.590 – minor histocompatibility loci
- MeSH G04.610.626.600 – minor lymphocyte stimulatory loci
- MeSH G04.610.626.820 – somatic hypermutation, immunoglobulin

=== MeSH G04.742 – plant physiology ===
==== MeSH G04.742.675 – plant diseases ====
- MeSH G04.742.675.700 – plant tumors

==== MeSH G04.742.800 – tropism ====
- MeSH G04.742.800.400 – gravitropism
- MeSH G04.742.800.700 – phototropism

=== MeSH G04.875 – species specificity ===
The list continues at List of MeSH codes (G05).
