= List of MeSH codes (G03) =

The following is a partial list of the "G" codes for Medical Subject Headings (MeSH), as defined by the United States National Library of Medicine (NLM).

This list continues the information at List of MeSH codes (G02). Codes following these are found at List of MeSH codes (G04). For other MeSH codes, see List of MeSH codes.

The source for this content is the set of 2006 MeSH Trees from the NLM.

== MeSH G03 – environment and public health ==
=== MeSH G03.230 – environment ===
MeSH code	Topic
MeSH G03.230.058	altitude
MeSH G03.230.069	cities
MeSH G03.230.074	confined spaces
MeSH G03.230.080 – conservation of natural resources
MeSH G03.230.080.078	conservation of energy resources
MeSH G03.230.100 – disasters
MeSH G03.230.100.035	disaster planning
MeSH G03.230.100.090	explosions
MeSH G03.230.100.120	fires
MeSH G03.230.100.120.110	fire extinguishing systems
MeSH G03.230.100.120.555	spontaneous combustion
MeSH G03.230.100.200	natural disasters
MeSH G03.230.100.200.900	volcanic eruption
MeSH G03.230.100.300	relief work
MeSH G03.230.100.350	rescue work
MeSH G03.230.124 – ecosystem
MeSH G03.230.124.049	biodiversity
MeSH G03.230.124.100	biomass
MeSH G03.230.124.240	ecological systems, closed
MeSH G03.230.124.250	food chain
MeSH G03.230.132 – energy-generating resources
MeSH G03.230.132.258	fossil fuels
MeSH G03.230.132.258.108	coal
MeSH G03.230.132.258.108.110	coke
MeSH G03.230.132.258.630	petroleum
MeSH G03.230.132.258.630.500	fuel oils
MeSH G03.230.132.258.630.540	gasoline
MeSH G03.230.132.258.630.600	kerosene
MeSH G03.230.132.580	nuclear energy
MeSH G03.230.132.580.500	nuclear fission
MeSH G03.230.132.580.520	nuclear fusion
MeSH G03.230.132.708	solar energy
MeSH G03.230.150 – environment, controlled
MeSH G03.230.150.050	air conditioning
MeSH G03.230.150.150	diving
MeSH G03.230.150.225	ecological systems, closed
MeSH G03.230.150.300	heating
MeSH G03.230.150.360	housing
MeSH G03.230.150.360.250	housing, animal
MeSH G03.230.150.360.250.200	hospitals, animal
MeSH G03.230.150.360.260	housing for the elderly
MeSH G03.230.150.360.650	public housing
MeSH G03.230.150.372	humidity
MeSH G03.230.150.391	life support systems
MeSH G03.230.150.410	lighting
MeSH G03.230.150.440	space simulation
MeSH G03.230.150.440.950	weightlessness simulation
MeSH G03.230.150.440.950.400	hindlimb suspension
MeSH G03.230.150.450	temperature
MeSH G03.230.150.520	ventilation
MeSH G03.230.200	environment design
MeSH G03.230.230 – extraterrestrial environment
MeSH G03.230.230.200	cosmic dust
MeSH G03.230.265	greenhouse effect
MeSH G03.230.300 – meteorological factors
MeSH G03.230.300.100	atmosphere
MeSH G03.230.300.100.150	air
MeSH G03.230.300.100.150.100	air ionization
MeSH G03.230.300.100.150.185	air movements
MeSH G03.230.300.100.150.185.200	wind
MeSH G03.230.300.100.185	atmospheric pressure
MeSH G03.230.300.100.185.100	air pressure
MeSH G03.230.300.100.185.902	vacuum
MeSH G03.230.300.100.250	climate
MeSH G03.230.300.100.250.275	cold climate
MeSH G03.230.300.100.250.325	desert climate
MeSH G03.230.300.100.250.387	greenhouse effect
MeSH G03.230.300.100.250.450	microclimate
MeSH G03.230.300.100.250.600	tropical climate
MeSH G03.230.300.100.300	cosmic radiation
MeSH G03.230.300.100.725	weather
MeSH G03.230.300.100.725.310	humidity
MeSH G03.230.300.100.725.375	lightning
MeSH G03.230.300.100.725.450	rain
MeSH G03.230.300.100.725.450.050	acid rain
MeSH G03.230.300.100.725.480	snow
MeSH G03.230.300.100.725.525	sunlight
MeSH G03.230.300.100.725.525.400	infrared rays
MeSH G03.230.300.100.725.525.600	ultraviolet rays
MeSH G03.230.300.100.725.710	temperature
MeSH G03.230.300.100.725.710.300	cold
MeSH G03.230.300.100.725.710.380	heat
MeSH G03.230.300.100.725.780	wind
MeSH G03.230.400	noise
MeSH G03.230.480	odors
MeSH G03.230.560	seasons
MeSH G03.230.600	soil
MeSH G03.230.700 – water
MeSH G03.230.700.250	fresh water
MeSH G03.230.700.250.500	rivers
MeSH G03.230.700.275	hot springs
MeSH G03.230.700.300	ice
MeSH G03.230.700.300.500	ice cover
MeSH G03.230.700.380	rain
MeSH G03.230.700.380.050	acid rain
MeSH G03.230.700.400	seawater
MeSH G03.230.700.417	snow
MeSH G03.230.700.435	steam
MeSH G03.230.700.485	water movements

=== MeSH G03.850 – public health ===
MeSH code	Topic
MeSH G03.850.110 – accidents
MeSH G03.850.110.060	accident prevention
MeSH G03.850.110.060.075	safety
MeSH G03.850.110.060.075.800	safety management
MeSH G03.850.110.085	accidental falls
MeSH G03.850.110.185	accidents, aviation
MeSH G03.850.110.205	accidents, home
MeSH G03.850.110.250	accidents, occupational
MeSH G03.850.110.250.250	accidents, radiation
MeSH G03.850.110.285	accidents, radiation
MeSH G03.850.110.320	accidents, traffic
MeSH G03.850.110.500	drowning
MeSH G03.850.110.500.500	near drowning
MeSH G03.850.160	carrier state
MeSH G03.850.210 – consumer product safety
MeSH G03.850.210.275	device approval
MeSH G03.850.290	disease outbreaks
MeSH G03.850.295 – disease reservoirs
MeSH G03.850.295.300	fomites
MeSH G03.850.310 – disease transmission
MeSH G03.850.310.300	disease transmission, horizontal
MeSH G03.850.310.300.080	basic reproduction number
MeSH G03.850.310.300.320	disease transmission, patient-to-professional
MeSH G03.850.310.300.330	disease transmission, professional-to-patient
MeSH G03.850.310.330	disease transmission, vertical
MeSH G03.850.310.800	disease vectors
MeSH G03.850.310.800.100	arthropod vectors
MeSH G03.850.310.800.100.100	arachnid vectors
MeSH G03.850.310.800.100.500	insect vectors
MeSH G03.850.360	drug contamination
MeSH G03.850.392	endemic diseases
MeSH G03.850.420	environmental medicine
MeSH G03.850.425 – environmental microbiology
MeSH G03.850.425.110	air microbiology
MeSH G03.850.425.200	food microbiology
MeSH G03.850.425.300	soil microbiology
MeSH G03.850.425.450	water microbiology
MeSH G03.850.460 – environmental pollution
MeSH G03.850.460.100	air pollution
MeSH G03.850.460.100.080	air pollution, indoor
MeSH G03.850.460.100.110	air pollution, radioactive
MeSH G03.850.460.100.210	dust
MeSH G03.850.460.100.210.200	cosmic dust
MeSH G03.850.460.100.310	smog
MeSH G03.850.460.100.340	smoke
MeSH G03.850.460.100.340.680	tobacco smoke pollution
MeSH G03.850.460.100.900	vehicle emissions
MeSH G03.850.460.200	body burden
MeSH G03.850.460.200.250	drug residues
MeSH G03.850.460.200.700	pesticide residues
MeSH G03.850.460.350	environmental exposure
MeSH G03.850.460.350.080	environmental monitoring
MeSH G03.850.460.350.112	inhalation exposure
MeSH G03.850.460.350.145	maternal exposure
MeSH G03.850.460.350.210	maximum allowable concentration
MeSH G03.850.460.350.600	occupational exposure
MeSH G03.850.460.350.600.615	maximum allowable concentration
MeSH G03.850.460.350.600.807	threshold limit values
MeSH G03.850.460.350.700	paternal exposure
MeSH G03.850.460.400	food contamination
MeSH G03.850.460.400.250	food contamination, radioactive
MeSH G03.850.460.400.300	food microbiology
MeSH G03.850.460.400.650	food parasitology
MeSH G03.850.460.610	noise
MeSH G03.850.460.610.526	noise, occupational
MeSH G03.850.460.610.680	noise, transportation
MeSH G03.850.460.710	waste products
MeSH G03.850.460.710.380	hazardous waste
MeSH G03.850.460.710.380.638	radioactive waste
MeSH G03.850.460.710.420	industrial waste
MeSH G03.850.460.710.460	medical waste
MeSH G03.850.460.710.460.150	dental waste
MeSH G03.850.460.710.460.300	medical waste disposal
MeSH G03.850.460.710.600	sewage
MeSH G03.850.460.790	water pollution
MeSH G03.850.460.790.410	water pollution, chemical
MeSH G03.850.460.790.410.050	acid rain
MeSH G03.850.460.790.460	water pollution, radioactive
MeSH G03.850.490 – epidemiologic factors
MeSH G03.850.490.250	age factors
MeSH G03.850.490.250.100	age of onset
MeSH G03.850.490.250.550	maternal age
MeSH G03.850.490.500	bias (epidemiology)
MeSH G03.850.490.500.250	observer variation
MeSH G03.850.490.500.500	selection bias
MeSH G03.850.490.625	causality
MeSH G03.850.490.625.500	precipitating factors
MeSH G03.850.490.625.750	risk factors
MeSH G03.850.490.687	comorbidity
MeSH G03.850.490.718	confounding factors (epidemiology)
MeSH G03.850.490.734	effect modifiers (epidemiology)
MeSH G03.850.490.734.500	cohort effect
MeSH G03.850.490.734.750	healthy worker effect
MeSH G03.850.490.734.875	placebo effect
MeSH G03.850.490.750	observer variation
MeSH G03.850.490.812	reproductive history
MeSH G03.850.490.812.250	gravidity
MeSH G03.850.490.812.600	parity
MeSH G03.850.490.875	sex factors
MeSH G03.850.505 – epidemiologic measurements
MeSH G03.850.505.200	biometry
MeSH G03.850.505.200.100	anthropometry
MeSH G03.850.505.200.100.175	body mass index
MeSH G03.850.505.200.100.300	cephalometry
MeSH G03.850.505.200.100.400	crown-rump length
MeSH G03.850.505.400	demography
MeSH G03.850.505.400.050	age distribution
MeSH G03.850.505.400.225	censuses
MeSH G03.850.505.400.400	family characteristics
MeSH G03.850.505.400.400.160	birth order
MeSH G03.850.505.400.425	health status
MeSH G03.850.505.400.425.350	geriatric assessment
MeSH G03.850.505.400.600	population density
MeSH G03.850.505.400.700	population dynamics
MeSH G03.850.505.400.700.350	emigration and immigration
MeSH G03.850.505.400.700.400	health transition
MeSH G03.850.505.400.700.650	population control
MeSH G03.850.505.400.700.660	population growth
MeSH G03.850.505.400.800	residence characteristics
MeSH G03.850.505.400.800.200	catchment area (health)
MeSH G03.850.505.400.800.400	housing
MeSH G03.850.505.400.800.700	residential mobility
MeSH G03.850.505.400.850	sex distribution
MeSH G03.850.505.400.850.815	sex ratio
MeSH G03.850.505.400.975	vital statistics
MeSH G03.850.505.400.975.450	life expectancy
MeSH G03.850.505.400.975.475	life tables
MeSH G03.850.505.400.975.525	morbidity
MeSH G03.850.505.400.975.525.080	basic reproduction number
MeSH G03.850.505.400.975.525.375	incidence
MeSH G03.850.505.400.975.525.750	prevalence
MeSH G03.850.505.400.975.550	mortality
MeSH G03.850.505.400.975.550.250	cause of death
MeSH G03.850.505.400.975.550.287	child mortality
MeSH G03.850.505.400.975.550.325	fatal outcome
MeSH G03.850.505.400.975.550.362	fetal mortality
MeSH G03.850.505.400.975.550.400	hospital mortality
MeSH G03.850.505.400.975.550.475	infant mortality
MeSH G03.850.505.400.975.550.500	maternal mortality
MeSH G03.850.505.400.975.550.900	survival rate
MeSH G03.850.505.400.975.775	pregnancy rate
MeSH G03.850.505.400.975.775.500	birth rate
MeSH G03.850.505.715	risk assessment
MeSH G03.850.520 – epidemiologic methods
MeSH G03.850.520.270	contact tracing
MeSH G03.850.520.308	data collection
MeSH G03.850.520.308.225	geriatric assessment
MeSH G03.850.520.308.250	health surveys
MeSH G03.850.520.308.250.149	behavioral risk factor surveillance system
MeSH G03.850.520.308.250.300	dental health surveys
MeSH G03.850.520.308.250.300.300	dental plaque index
MeSH G03.850.520.308.250.300.350	dmf index
MeSH G03.850.520.308.250.300.675	oral hygiene index
MeSH G03.850.520.308.250.300.725	periodontal index
MeSH G03.850.520.308.250.475	health status indicators
MeSH G03.850.520.308.250.475.730	sickness impact profile
MeSH G03.850.520.308.250.580	mass screening
MeSH G03.850.520.308.250.580.174	anonymous testing
MeSH G03.850.520.308.250.580.350	genetic screening
MeSH G03.850.520.308.250.580.510	mass chest x-ray
MeSH G03.850.520.308.250.580.560	multiphasic screening
MeSH G03.850.520.308.250.580.580	neonatal screening
MeSH G03.850.520.308.250.580.925	vision screening
MeSH G03.850.520.308.250.600	nutrition surveys
MeSH G03.850.520.308.250.600.350	diet surveys
MeSH G03.850.520.308.250.700	population surveillance
MeSH G03.850.520.308.250.700.650	sentinel surveillance
MeSH G03.850.520.308.335	health care surveys
MeSH G03.850.520.308.420	interviews
MeSH G03.850.520.308.420.200	focus groups
MeSH G03.850.520.308.502	narration
MeSH G03.850.520.308.585	nutrition assessment
MeSH G03.850.520.308.585.550	nutrition surveys
MeSH G03.850.520.308.585.550.350	diet surveys
MeSH G03.850.520.308.750	questionnaires
MeSH G03.850.520.308.940	records
MeSH G03.850.520.308.940.250	birth certificates
MeSH G03.850.520.308.940.350	death certificates
MeSH G03.850.520.308.940.375	dental records
MeSH G03.850.520.308.940.425	hospital records
MeSH G03.850.520.308.940.968	medical records
MeSH G03.850.520.308.940.968.500	medical record linkage
MeSH G03.850.520.308.940.968.625	medical records systems, computerized
MeSH G03.850.520.308.940.968.750	medical records, problem-oriented
MeSH G03.850.520.308.940.968.875	trauma severity indices
MeSH G03.850.520.308.940.984	nursing records
MeSH G03.850.520.308.970	registries
MeSH G03.850.520.308.970.725	seer program
MeSH G03.850.520.308.985	vital statistics
MeSH G03.850.520.308.985.450	life expectancy
MeSH G03.850.520.308.985.475	life tables
MeSH G03.850.520.308.985.525	morbidity
MeSH G03.850.520.308.985.525.080	basic reproduction number
MeSH G03.850.520.308.985.525.375	incidence
MeSH G03.850.520.308.985.525.750	prevalence
MeSH G03.850.520.308.985.550	mortality
MeSH G03.850.520.308.985.550.250	cause of death
MeSH G03.850.520.308.985.550.287	child mortality
MeSH G03.850.520.308.985.550.325	fatal outcome
MeSH G03.850.520.308.985.550.362	fetal mortality
MeSH G03.850.520.308.985.550.400	hospital mortality
MeSH G03.850.520.308.985.550.475	infant mortality
MeSH G03.850.520.308.985.550.500	maternal mortality
MeSH G03.850.520.308.985.550.900	survival rate
MeSH G03.850.520.308.985.775	pregnancy rate
MeSH G03.850.520.308.985.775.500	birth rate
MeSH G03.850.520.373	disease notification
MeSH G03.850.520.438	epidemiology, molecular
MeSH G03.850.520.445	epidemiologic research design
MeSH G03.850.520.445.150	cross-over studies
MeSH G03.850.520.445.300	double-blind method
MeSH G03.850.520.445.485	matched-pair analysis
MeSH G03.850.520.445.500	meta-analysis
MeSH G03.850.520.445.700	random allocation
MeSH G03.850.520.445.725	reproducibility of results
MeSH G03.850.520.445.762	sample size
MeSH G03.850.520.445.800	sensitivity and specificity
MeSH G03.850.520.445.800.650	predictive value of tests
MeSH G03.850.520.445.800.750	roc curve
MeSH G03.850.520.445.850	single-blind method
MeSH G03.850.520.450	epidemiologic study characteristics
MeSH G03.850.520.450.500	epidemiologic studies
MeSH G03.850.520.450.500.500	case-control studies
MeSH G03.850.520.450.500.500.500	retrospective studies
MeSH G03.850.520.450.500.750	cohort studies
MeSH G03.850.520.450.500.750.350	follow-up studies
MeSH G03.850.520.450.500.750.500	longitudinal studies
MeSH G03.850.520.450.500.750.650	prospective studies
MeSH G03.850.520.450.500.875	cross-sectional studies
MeSH G03.850.520.450.500.950	seroepidemiologic studies
MeSH G03.850.520.450.500.950.375	hiv seroprevalence
MeSH G03.850.520.450.535	clinical trials
MeSH G03.850.520.450.535.200	clinical trials, phase i
MeSH G03.850.520.450.535.210	clinical trials, phase ii
MeSH G03.850.520.450.535.220	clinical trials, phase iii
MeSH G03.850.520.450.535.230	clinical trials, phase iv
MeSH G03.850.520.450.535.365	controlled clinical trials
MeSH G03.850.520.450.535.365.500	randomized controlled trials
MeSH G03.850.520.450.535.500	multicenter studies
MeSH G03.850.520.450.550	feasibility studies
MeSH G03.850.520.450.565	intervention studies
MeSH G03.850.520.450.720	pilot projects
MeSH G03.850.520.450.875	sampling studies
MeSH G03.850.520.450.900	twin studies
MeSH G03.850.520.699	sentinel surveillance
MeSH G03.850.520.830	statistics
MeSH G03.850.520.830.100	actuarial analysis
MeSH G03.850.520.830.150	analysis of variance
MeSH G03.850.520.830.150.500	multivariate analysis
MeSH G03.850.520.830.200	area under curve
MeSH G03.850.520.830.250	cluster analysis
MeSH G03.850.520.830.250.675	small-area analysis
MeSH G03.850.520.830.250.700	space-time clustering
MeSH G03.850.520.830.275	confidence intervals
MeSH G03.850.520.830.300	data interpretation, statistical
MeSH G03.850.520.830.350	discriminant analysis
MeSH G03.850.520.830.400	factor analysis, statistical
MeSH G03.850.520.830.475	matched-pair analysis
MeSH G03.850.520.830.500	models, statistical
MeSH G03.850.520.830.500.475	likelihood functions
MeSH G03.850.520.830.500.500	linear models
MeSH G03.850.520.830.500.525	logistic models
MeSH G03.850.520.830.500.600	models, economic
MeSH G03.850.520.830.500.600.500	models, econometric
MeSH G03.850.520.830.500.625	nomograms
MeSH G03.850.520.830.500.700	proportional hazards models
MeSH G03.850.520.830.525	monte carlo method
MeSH G03.850.520.830.600	probability
MeSH G03.850.520.830.600.200	Bayes' theorem
MeSH G03.850.520.830.600.400	likelihood functions
MeSH G03.850.520.830.600.500	markov chains
MeSH G03.850.520.830.600.600	odds ratio
MeSH G03.850.520.830.600.700	proportional hazards models
MeSH G03.850.520.830.600.800	risk
MeSH G03.850.520.830.600.800.450	logistic models
MeSH G03.850.520.830.600.800.715	risk assessment
MeSH G03.850.520.830.600.800.725	risk factors
MeSH G03.850.520.830.600.900	uncertainty
MeSH G03.850.520.830.750	regression analysis
MeSH G03.850.520.830.750.400	least-squares analysis
MeSH G03.850.520.830.750.425	linear models
MeSH G03.850.520.830.750.450	logistic models
MeSH G03.850.520.830.750.725	proportional hazards models
MeSH G03.850.520.830.872	sensitivity and specificity
MeSH G03.850.520.830.994	statistical distributions
MeSH G03.850.520.830.994.250	binomial distribution
MeSH G03.850.520.830.994.300	chi-square distribution
MeSH G03.850.520.830.994.500	normal distribution
MeSH G03.850.520.830.994.750	poisson distribution
MeSH G03.850.520.830.995	statistics, nonparametric
MeSH G03.850.520.830.996	stochastic processes
MeSH G03.850.520.830.996.500	markov chains
MeSH G03.850.520.830.998	survival analysis
MeSH G03.850.520.830.998.300	disease-free survival
MeSH G03.850.540	equipment contamination
MeSH G03.850.585	equipment reuse
MeSH G03.850.630	health education
MeSH G03.850.650	health transition
MeSH G03.850.670 – hygiene
MeSH G03.850.670.300	military hygiene
MeSH G03.850.780 – public health practice
MeSH G03.850.780.200	communicable disease control
MeSH G03.850.780.200.225	contact tracing
MeSH G03.850.780.200.262	disease notification
MeSH G03.850.780.200.300	fumigation
MeSH G03.850.780.200.400	handwashing
MeSH G03.850.780.200.425	immunization
MeSH G03.850.780.200.425.449	mass immunization
MeSH G03.850.780.200.425.900	vaccination
MeSH G03.850.780.200.450	infection control
MeSH G03.850.780.200.450.150	antisepsis
MeSH G03.850.780.200.450.150.160	asepsis
MeSH G03.850.780.200.450.500	infection control, dental
MeSH G03.850.780.200.450.650	patient isolation
MeSH G03.850.780.200.450.700	quarantine
MeSH G03.850.780.200.450.850	sterilization
MeSH G03.850.780.200.450.850.375	disinfection
MeSH G03.850.780.200.550	mandatory testing
MeSH G03.850.780.200.650	pest control
MeSH G03.850.780.200.650.425	insect control
MeSH G03.850.780.200.650.425.500	mosquito control
MeSH G03.850.780.200.650.650	pest control, biological
MeSH G03.850.780.200.650.700	rodent control
MeSH G03.850.780.200.650.850	tick control
MeSH G03.850.780.200.800	sanitation
MeSH G03.850.780.200.800.325	food inspection
MeSH G03.850.780.200.800.800	sanitary engineering
MeSH G03.850.780.200.800.800.350	drainage, sanitary
MeSH G03.850.780.200.800.800.700	refuse disposal
MeSH G03.850.780.200.800.800.890	waste disposal, fluid
MeSH G03.850.780.200.800.800.900	waste management
MeSH G03.850.780.200.800.800.900.900	water purification
MeSH G03.850.780.200.925	universal precautions
MeSH G03.850.780.325	decontamination
MeSH G03.850.780.375	environmental monitoring
MeSH G03.850.780.375.700	radiation monitoring
MeSH G03.850.780.500	mass screening
MeSH G03.850.780.500.162	anonymous testing
MeSH G03.850.780.500.325	genetic screening
MeSH G03.850.780.500.412	mandatory testing
MeSH G03.850.780.500.500	mass chest x-ray
MeSH G03.850.780.500.560	multiphasic screening
MeSH G03.850.780.500.580	neonatal screening
MeSH G03.850.780.500.765	substance abuse detection
MeSH G03.850.780.500.950	vision screening
MeSH G03.850.780.675	population surveillance
MeSH G03.850.780.675.650	sentinel surveillance
MeSH G03.850.780.680	primary prevention
MeSH G03.850.780.680.310	immunization
MeSH G03.850.780.680.310.444	mass immunization
MeSH G03.850.780.680.310.890	vaccination
MeSH G03.850.810 – radiologic health
MeSH G03.850.810.080	air pollution, radioactive
MeSH G03.850.810.125	food contamination, radioactive
MeSH G03.850.810.250	radiation dosage
MeSH G03.850.810.250.180	dose-response relationship, radiation
MeSH G03.850.810.250.275	relative biological effectiveness
MeSH G03.850.810.300	radiation effects
MeSH G03.850.810.300.360	radiation injuries
MeSH G03.850.810.300.360.031	abnormalities, radiation-induced
MeSH G03.850.810.300.360.285	radiation injuries, experimental
MeSH G03.850.810.335	radiation genetics
MeSH G03.850.810.370	radiation monitoring
MeSH G03.850.810.370.310	film dosimetry
MeSH G03.850.810.370.420	thermoluminescent dosimetry
MeSH G03.850.810.425	radiation protection
MeSH G03.850.810.460	radioactive fallout
MeSH G03.850.810.485	radioactive waste
MeSH G03.850.810.530	water pollution, radioactive
MeSH G03.850.860 – sanitation
MeSH G03.850.860.410	public facilities
MeSH G03.850.860.410.110	bathing beaches
MeSH G03.850.860.410.250	health resorts
MeSH G03.850.860.410.500	swimming pools
MeSH G03.850.860.410.560	toilet facilities
MeSH G03.850.860.510	sanitary engineering
MeSH G03.850.860.510.090	biodegradation
MeSH G03.850.860.510.490	toilet facilities
MeSH G03.850.860.510.900	waste management
MeSH G03.850.860.510.900.600	refuse disposal
MeSH G03.850.860.510.900.600.400	garbage
MeSH G03.850.860.510.900.600.500	incineration
MeSH G03.850.860.510.900.600.600	medical waste disposal
MeSH G03.850.860.510.900.600.900	waste disposal, fluid
MeSH G03.850.860.510.900.700	sewage
MeSH G03.850.860.510.900.700.900	waste disposal, fluid
MeSH G03.850.860.510.900.900	water purification
MeSH G03.850.860.510.910	water softening
MeSH G03.850.860.510.915	water supply
MeSH G03.850.860.510.915.300	fluoridation
MeSH G03.850.860.510.915.900	water purification

=== MeSH G03.890 – public health dentistry ===
MeSH code	Topic
MeSH G03.890.160 – dental health surveys
MeSH G03.890.160.090	dental plaque index
MeSH G03.890.160.100	dmf index
MeSH G03.890.160.168	oral hygiene index
MeSH G03.890.160.215	periodontal index
MeSH G03.890.235	fluoridation
MeSH G03.890.410	health education, dental

The list continues at List of MeSH codes (G04).
