= European Risk Observatory =

European risk analysis observation post

The European Risk Observatory is based at the European Agency for Safety and Health at Work (EU-OSHA). It aims to provide:

- An overview of health at work in Europe
- A description of the trends and underlying factors
- A description of the risk factors
- Anticipation of changes in work and their likely consequences on health

By doing so, the Observatory intends (in particular) to draw attention to new and emerging risks and enable preventive action. These monitoring and forecasting activities are based (as much as possible) on the collection, analysis and consolidation of existing data from national and international sources such as:

- Labour Force Surveys
- Workers' surveys
- Accident registers
- Occupational-disease registers
- Death registers
- Exposure registers

Beyond the collation of data, the Observatory also provides more qualitative information to support the identification of new and emerging risks. This information is mainly based on expert forecast and research reviews but may extend to other sources, such as information collected by control bodies. EU-OSHA is responsible for the management of the Observatory and consolidation of data. External contractors and an EU-wide network of national institutes contributing to the collection and analysis of the data support the Agency in its mission.

== Methodology ==
=== Data sources ===
Data collection is based on existing, available sources. All data have been collected from published and online statistical sources. Existing tables and graphics are used. Not all sources present the data in a similar way or use the same breakdown criteria, so some data are difficult to compare. Where available, efforts have been made to use raw data sources, which are treated according to the expected output. This is, for example, the case for data from the European Working Conditions Survey (with regard to European and Belgian data), the occupational diseases statistics in Belgium and the Danish Work Environment Cohort Study.

Sources are both statistical and analytical background documents. The statistical sources are a combination of administrative registers and statistics (occupational disease registers, exposure registers), surveys, voluntary reporting systems and inspection reports. A global-risk picture can thus be presented by combining different data sources.

== Administrative data sources ==
=== Work accidents ===
The European Statistics on Accidents at Work (ESAW) have been used to collect statistical data on accidents at work. These statistics are available from 1994 onwards. They allow a uniform presentation for European and member-state statistics and a comparison between member-state statistics. A harmonized methodology for data collection has been created. Information is collected on the following variables: economic activity of the employer, occupation, age and sex of the victim, type of injury, body part injured, time of the accident, size of the business, employment status of the victim and work days lost. Phase three of the ESAW methodology has been gradually implemented from the reference year 2001 onwards. In addition to the variables above, it includes information concerning the circumstances and events leading to the accidents.

The details of the ESAW methodology are described in European statistics on accidents at work (ESAW) - Methodology - 2001 edition. A resume of the concepts and coverage of the data may also be found in Work and health in the EU: A statistical portrait 1994-2002.

=== Occupational diseases ===
Both the European Statistics on Occupational Diseases (ESOD) and national data sources have been used to collect statistical data on occupational diseases. The project on European Statistics on Occupational Diseases (EODS) started with a pilot data-collection for the reference year 1995. The first data according to Phase One methodology was collected for 2001. The Phase One methodology of EODS includes detailed information on the causative agent of the occupational disease; the collection of information on the uses of these causative agents is planned as well. The main drawback of both of these data-collection systems is that not all workers are covered by the national data-collection systems in all member states. Occupational-disease problems also arise from under-reporting and differences between the national social security systems.

=== Exposure registers ===
An alternative to concentrating on disease occurrence is to monitor exposure. An exposure register records data relevant to occupational health-and-safety outcomes. It is different from a disease register in that it concentrates on workplace exposure, rather than the disorders it causes. The measurement services of the institutions for statutory accident insurance and prevention (BGs) in Germany perform exposure measurements at workplaces. The data are stored in the BG/BIA exposure database.

==== Physician reporting ====
Sentinel surveillance uses a network of health care providers to report cases of occupational disease. This approach is similar to a register of occupational diseases, with some important differences. Sentinel networks may not try to achieve total coverage, and may operate in a restricted geographical area or involve a sample of physicians. In the UK, the THOR network is responsible for the collection of specialist-based work-related disease data. The program relies on the systematic, voluntary and confidential reporting of new cases by consulting thoracic physicians throughout the country. Regular reports are required from physicians detailing the number of new cases in each of 10 diagnostic categories and data for each case based on age, sex, place of residence, type of work and suspected agent. The Occupational Surveillance Scheme for Audiologists (OSSA) operates within the THOR network.

=== Inspections ===
In some countries, medical inspections carried out by the labour inspectorate play an essential role in ensuring that laws and regulations governing workers’ health surveillance are properly applied. The Arbomonitor in the Netherlands provides representative information on the state of working conditions in Dutch companies: risks, policies and prevention. The information is gathered through the Labour Inspection on company visits.
