= List of MeSH codes =

Medical Subject Headings

Medical subject headings

Content
- Description: Medical subject headings.
- Data types captured: controlled vocabulary

Contact
- Research center: United States National Library of Medicine; National Center for Biotechnology Information
- Laboratory: United States National Library of Medicine
- Authors: F B ROGERS
- Primary citation: PMID 13982385

The following is a list of the codes for MeSH (Medical Subject Headings), a comprehensive controlled vocabulary for the purpose of indexing journal articles and books in the life sciences. It is a product of the United States National Library of Medicine (NLM).

The prefixes (A01, etc.) are linked to more extensive sub-lists of codes; the medical terms are linked to articles on those topics.

The source for this content is the set of 2024 MeSH Trees from NLM.

- A – Anatomy
  - A01 – body regions (74 articles)
  - A02 – musculoskeletal system (213 articles)
  - A03 – digestive system (98 articles)
  - A04 – respiratory system (46 articles)
  - A05 – urogenital system (87 articles)
  - A06 – endocrine system
  - A07 – cardiovascular system
  - A08 – nervous system
  - A09 – sense organs
  - A10 – tissues
  - A11 – cells
  - A12 – fluids and secretions
  - A13 – animal structures
  - A14 – stomatognathic system
  - A15 – hemic and immune systems
  - A16 – embryonic structures
  - A17 – integumentary system
  - A18 – plant structures
  - A19 – fungal structures
  - A20 – bacterial structures
  - A21 – viral structures
- B – Organisms
  - B01 – eukaryota (animals, plants, fungi)
  - B02 – archaea
  - B03 – bacteria
  - B04 – viruses
  - B05 – organism forms
- C – Diseases
  - C01 – bacterial infections and mycoses
  - C02 – virus diseases
  - C03 – parasitic diseases
  - C04 – neoplasms
  - C05 – musculoskeletal diseases
  - C06 – digestive system diseases
  - C07 – stomatognathic diseases
  - C08 – respiratory tract diseases
  - C09 – otorhinolaryngologic diseases
  - C10 – nervous system diseases
  - C11 – eye diseases
  - C12 – urologic and male genital diseases
  - C13 – female genital diseases and pregnancy complications
  - C14 – cardiovascular diseases
  - C15 – hemic and lymphatic diseases
  - C16 – congenital, hereditary, and neonatal diseases and abnormalities
  - C17 – skin and connective tissue diseases
  - C18 – nutritional and metabolic diseases
  - C19 – endocrine system diseases
  - C20 – immune system diseases
  - C21 – disorders of environmental origin
  - C22 – animal diseases
  - C23 – pathological conditions, signs and symptoms
  - C24 – occupational diseases
  - C25 – chemically induced disorders
  - C26 – wounds and injuries
- D – Chemicals and Drugs
  - D01 – inorganic chemicals
  - D02 – organic chemicals
  - D03 – heterocyclic compounds
  - D04 – polycyclic compounds
  - D05 – macromolecular substances
  - D06 – hormones, hormone substitutes, and hormone antagonists
  - D07 – none (enzymes and coenzymes)
  - D08 – enzymes and coenzymes (carbohydrates)
  - D09 – carbohydrates (lipids)
  - D10 – lipids (amino acids, peptides, and proteins)
  - D11 – none (nucleic acids, nucleotides, and nucleosides)
  - D12 – amino acids, peptides, and proteins
  - D13 – nucleic acids, nucleotides, and nucleosides
  - D20 – complex mixtures
  - D23 – biological factors
  - D25 – biomedical and dental materials
  - D26 – pharmaceutical preparations
  - D27 – chemical actions and uses
- E – Analytical, Diagnostic and Therapeutic Techniques and Equipment
  - E01 – diagnosis
  - E02 – therapeutics
  - E03 – anesthesia and analgesia
  - E04 – surgical procedures, operative
  - E05 – investigative techniques
  - E06 – dentistry
  - E07 – equipment and supplies
- F – Psychiatry and Psychology
  - F01 – behavior and behavior mechanisms
  - F02 – psychological phenomena and processes
  - F03 – mental disorders
  - F04 – behavioral disciplines and activities
- G – Phenomena and Processes
  - G01 – physical phenomena
  - G02 – chemical phenomena
  - G03 – metabolism
  - G04 – cell phenomena and immunity
  - G05 – genetic phenomena
  - G06 – microbiological phenomena
  - G07 – physiological processes
  - G08 – reproductive and urinary physiological phenomena
  - G09 – circulatory and respiratory physiological phenomena
  - G10 – digestive and oral physiological phenomena
  - G11 – musculoskeletal and neural physiological phenomena
  - G12 – immune system phenomena
  - G13 – integumentary system physiological phenomena
  - G14 – ocular physiological phenomena
  - G15 – plant physiological phenomena
  - G16 – biological phenomena
  - G17 – mathematical concepts
- H – Disciplines and Occupations
  - H01 – natural science disciplines
  - H02 – health occupations
- I – Anthropology, Education, Sociology and Social Phenomena
  - I01 – social sciences
  - I02 – education
  - I03 – human activities
- J – Technology and Food and Beverages
  - J01 – technology, industry, and agriculture
  - J02 – food and beverages
  - J03 – non-medical public and private facilities
- K – Humanities
  - K01 – humanities
- L – Information Science
  - L01 – information science
- M – Persons
  - M01 – persons
- N – Health Care
  - N01 – population characteristics
  - N02 – health care facilities, manpower, and services
  - N03 – health care economics and organizations
  - N04 – health services administration
  - N05 – health care quality, access, and evaluation
  - N06 – environment and public health
- V – Publication Characteristics
  - V01 – publication components (publication type)
  - V02 – publication formats (publication type)
  - V03 – study characteristics (publication type)
  - V04 – support of research
- Z – Geographic Locations
  - Z01 – geographic locations
