= List of MeSH codes (G02) =

The following is a partial list of the "G" codes for Medical Subject Headings (MeSH), as defined by the United States National Library of Medicine (NLM).

This list continues the information at List of MeSH codes (G01). Codes following these are found at List of MeSH codes (G03). For other MeSH codes, see List of MeSH codes.

The source for this content is the set of 2006 MeSH Trees from the NLM.

== MeSH G02 – health occupations ==
=== MeSH G02.010 – allied health occupations ===
- MeSH G02.010.150 – audiology
- MeSH G02.010.500 – occupational therapy
- MeSH G02.010.625 – physical therapy (specialty)
- MeSH G02.010.750 – speech-language pathology
- MeSH G02.010.800 – technology, dental
- MeSH G02.010.825 – technology, medical
- MeSH G02.010.850 – technology, radiologic
- MeSH G02.010.850.700 – teleradiology

=== MeSH G02.163 – dentistry ===
- MeSH G02.163.090 – dental research
- MeSH G02.163.180 – dentistry, operative
- MeSH G02.163.285 – forensic dentistry
- MeSH G02.163.342 – general practice, dental
- MeSH G02.163.394 – geriatric dentistry
- MeSH G02.163.592 – military dentistry
- MeSH G02.163.640 – occupational dentistry
- MeSH G02.163.670 – oral medicine
- MeSH G02.163.700 – pediatric dentistry
- MeSH G02.163.721 – preventive dentistry
- MeSH G02.163.809 – school dentistry
- MeSH G02.163.876 – specialties, dental
- MeSH G02.163.876.213 – endodontics
- MeSH G02.163.876.439 – orthodontics
- MeSH G02.163.876.506 – pathology, oral
- MeSH G02.163.876.600 – pediatric dentistry
- MeSH G02.163.876.623 – periodontics
- MeSH G02.163.876.708 – prosthodontics
- MeSH G02.163.876.770 – public health dentistry
- MeSH G02.163.876.770.357 – community dentistry
- MeSH G02.163.876.886 – surgery, oral

=== MeSH G02.229 – environmental health ===
- MeSH G02.229.333 – health physics
- MeSH G02.229.656 – sanitary engineering
- MeSH G02.229.782 – sanitation

=== MeSH G02.403 – medicine ===
- MeSH G02.403.028 – adolescent medicine
- MeSH G02.403.059 – andrology
- MeSH G02.403.074 – bariatrics
- MeSH G02.403.090 – behavioral medicine
- MeSH G02.403.200 – clinical medicine
- MeSH G02.403.200.400 – evidence-based medicine
- MeSH G02.403.220 – community medicine
- MeSH G02.403.290 – epidemiology
- MeSH G02.403.290.300 – epidemiology, molecular
- MeSH G02.403.290.650 – pharmacoepidemiology
- MeSH G02.403.388 – genetics, medical
- MeSH G02.403.398 – geriatrics
- MeSH G02.403.428 – medicine, herbal
- MeSH G02.403.458 – military medicine
- MeSH G02.403.478 – naval medicine
- MeSH G02.403.478.508 – submarine medicine
- MeSH G02.403.500 – osteopathic medicine
- MeSH G02.403.642 – psychiatry
- MeSH G02.403.642.080 – adolescent psychiatry
- MeSH G02.403.642.100 – biological psychiatry
- MeSH G02.403.642.130 – child psychiatry
- MeSH G02.403.642.150 – community psychiatry
- MeSH G02.403.642.150.580 – preventive psychiatry
- MeSH G02.403.642.208 – forensic psychiatry
- MeSH G02.403.642.260 – geriatric psychiatry
- MeSH G02.403.642.508 – military psychiatry
- MeSH G02.403.720 – social medicine
- MeSH G02.403.776 – specialties, medical
- MeSH G02.403.776.014 – aerospace medicine
- MeSH G02.403.776.030 – allergy and immunology
- MeSH G02.403.776.050 – anesthesiology
- MeSH G02.403.776.185 – dermatology
- MeSH G02.403.776.200 – emergency medicine
- MeSH G02.403.776.230 – family practice
- MeSH G02.403.776.240 – forensic medicine
- MeSH G02.403.776.240.300 – forensic pathology
- MeSH G02.403.776.324 – hospitalists
- MeSH G02.403.776.409 – internal medicine
- MeSH G02.403.776.409.163 – cardiology
- MeSH G02.403.776.409.323 – endocrinology
- MeSH G02.403.776.409.405 – gastroenterology
- MeSH G02.403.776.409.445 – hematology
- MeSH G02.403.776.409.515 – medical oncology
- MeSH G02.403.776.409.515.500 – radiation oncology
- MeSH G02.403.776.409.580 – nephrology
- MeSH G02.403.776.409.675 – pulmonary disease (specialty)
- MeSH G02.403.776.409.730 – rheumatology
- MeSH G02.403.776.550 – neurology
- MeSH G02.403.776.600 – pathology
- MeSH G02.403.776.600.249 – forensic pathology
- MeSH G02.403.776.600.500 – pathology, clinical
- MeSH G02.403.776.600.510 – pathology, surgical
- MeSH G02.403.776.600.600 – telepathology
- MeSH G02.403.776.610 – pediatrics
- MeSH G02.403.776.610.400 – neonatology
- MeSH G02.403.776.610.500 – perinatology
- MeSH G02.403.776.620 – physical medicine
- MeSH G02.403.776.620.600 – physical rehabilitation
- MeSH G02.403.776.630 – preventive medicine
- MeSH G02.403.776.630.250 – environmental medicine
- MeSH G02.403.776.630.510 – occupational medicine
- MeSH G02.403.776.630.550 – preventive psychiatry
- MeSH G02.403.776.640 – psychiatry
- MeSH G02.403.776.640.200 – child psychiatry
- MeSH G02.403.776.670 – public health
- MeSH G02.403.776.700 – radiology
- MeSH G02.403.776.700.500 – nuclear medicine
- MeSH G02.403.776.700.650 – radiation oncology
- MeSH G02.403.776.700.675 – radiology, interventional
- MeSH G02.403.776.710 – reproductive medicine
- MeSH G02.403.776.880 – venereology
- MeSH G02.403.810 – specialties, surgical
- MeSH G02.403.810.208 – colorectal surgery
- MeSH G02.403.810.310 – gynecology
- MeSH G02.403.810.425 – neurosurgery
- MeSH G02.403.810.450 – obstetrics
- MeSH G02.403.810.468 – ophthalmology
- MeSH G02.403.810.494 – orthopedics
- MeSH G02.403.810.526 – otolaryngology
- MeSH G02.403.810.720 – regenerative medicine
- MeSH G02.403.810.762 – surgery
- MeSH G02.403.810.788 – surgery, plastic
- MeSH G02.403.810.803 – thoracic surgery
- MeSH G02.403.810.860 – urology
- MeSH G02.403.830 – sports medicine
- MeSH G02.403.840 – telemedicine
- MeSH G02.403.840.550 – remote consultation
- MeSH G02.403.840.600 – telepathology
- MeSH G02.403.840.700 – teleradiology
- MeSH G02.403.850 – traumatology
- MeSH G02.403.919 – tropical medicine

=== MeSH G02.438 – mortuary practice ===
- MeSH G02.438.173 – burial
- MeSH G02.438.554 – embalming

=== MeSH G02.478 – nursing ===
- MeSH G02.478.395 – nursing research
- MeSH G02.478.395.234 – clinical nursing research
- MeSH G02.478.395.385 – nursing administration research
- MeSH G02.478.395.413 – nursing education research
- MeSH G02.478.395.432 – nursing evaluation research
- MeSH G02.478.395.634 – nursing methodology research
- MeSH G02.478.408 – nursing theory
- MeSH G02.478.676 – specialties, nursing
- MeSH G02.478.676.150 – community health nursing
- MeSH G02.478.676.200 – emergency nursing
- MeSH G02.478.676.218 – family nursing
- MeSH G02.478.676.236 – geriatric nursing
- MeSH G02.478.676.313 – holistic nursing
- MeSH G02.478.676.390 – maternal-child nursing
- MeSH G02.478.676.390.600 – neonatal nursing
- MeSH G02.478.676.416 – midwifery
- MeSH G02.478.676.458 – military nursing
- MeSH G02.478.676.570 – obstetrical nursing
- MeSH G02.478.676.590 – occupational health nursing
- MeSH G02.478.676.605 – oncologic nursing
- MeSH G02.478.676.615 – orthopedic nursing
- MeSH G02.478.676.631 – pediatric nursing
- MeSH G02.478.676.631.600 – neonatal nursing
- MeSH G02.478.676.650 – perioperative nursing
- MeSH G02.478.676.650.625 – operating room nursing
- MeSH G02.478.676.650.650 – postanesthesia nursing
- MeSH G02.478.676.710 – psychiatric nursing
- MeSH G02.478.676.755 – public health nursing
- MeSH G02.478.676.789 – rehabilitation nursing
- MeSH G02.478.676.824 – school nursing
- MeSH G02.478.676.920 – transcultural nursing

=== MeSH G02.628 – pharmacology ===
- MeSH G02.628.100 – ethnopharmacology
- MeSH G02.628.190 – medicine, herbal
- MeSH G02.628.280 – neuropharmacology
- MeSH G02.628.413 – pharmacoepidemiology
- MeSH G02.628.479 – pharmacogenetics
- MeSH G02.628.479.850 – toxicogenetics
- MeSH G02.628.546 – psychopharmacology
- MeSH G02.628.795 – toxicology
- MeSH G02.628.795.850 – toxicogenetics

=== MeSH G02.956 – veterinary medicine ===
- MeSH G02.956.465 – pathology, veterinary
- MeSH G02.956.692 – surgery, veterinary
- MeSH G02.956.858 – veterinary service, military

The list continues at List of MeSH codes (G03).
