= List of MeSH codes (G05) =

The following is a partial list of the "G" codes for Medical Subject Headings (MeSH), as defined by the United States National Library of Medicine (NLM).

This list continues the information at List of MeSH codes (G04). Codes following these are found at List of MeSH codes (G06). For other MeSH codes, see List of MeSH codes.

The source for this content is the set of 2006 MeSH Trees from the NLM.

== MeSH G05 – genetic processes ==
=== MeSH G05.090 – breeding ===
- MeSH G05.090.390 – hybridization, genetic
- MeSH G05.090.403 – inbreeding
- MeSH G05.090.403.180 – consanguinity

=== MeSH G05.105 – cell division ===
- MeSH G05.105.220 – cell nucleus division
- MeSH G05.105.220.500 – anaphase
- MeSH G05.105.220.625 – chromosome segregation
- MeSH G05.105.220.625.620 – nondisjunction, genetic
- MeSH G05.105.220.687 – meiosis
- MeSH G05.105.220.687.500 – meiotic prophase i
- MeSH G05.105.220.687.500.299 – chromosome pairing
- MeSH G05.105.220.687.500.299.500 – synaptonemal complex
- MeSH G05.105.220.687.500.600 – pachytene stage
- MeSH G05.105.220.750 – metaphase
- MeSH G05.105.220.781 – mitosis
- MeSH G05.105.220.781.050 – anaphase
- MeSH G05.105.220.781.625 – metaphase
- MeSH G05.105.220.781.812 – prometaphase
- MeSH G05.105.220.781.906 – prophase
- MeSH G05.105.220.781.953 – telophase
- MeSH G05.105.220.812 – prometaphase
- MeSH G05.105.220.875 – prophase
- MeSH G05.105.220.875.500 – meiotic prophase i
- MeSH G05.105.220.875.500.299 – chromosome pairing
- MeSH G05.105.220.875.500.299.500 – synaptonemal complex
- MeSH G05.105.220.875.500.600 – pachytene stage
- MeSH G05.105.220.937 – telophase

=== MeSH G05.180 – dna damage ===
- MeSH G05.180.099 – chromosome breakage
- MeSH G05.180.185 – dna fragmentation

=== MeSH G05.192 – dna packaging ===
- MeSH G05.192.095 – chromatin assembly and disassembly

=== MeSH G05.195 – dna repair ===
- MeSH G05.195.830 – sos response (genetics)

=== MeSH G05.200 – dna replication ===
- MeSH G05.200.760 – dna replication timing
- MeSH G05.200.880 – s phase

=== MeSH G05.265 – evolution ===
- MeSH G05.265.250 – evolution, molecular
- MeSH G05.265.350 – genetic speciation

=== MeSH G05.310 – gene expression ===
- MeSH G05.310.670 – protein biosynthesis
- MeSH G05.310.700 – transcription, genetic
- MeSH G05.310.700.500 – reverse transcription

=== MeSH G05.315 – gene expression regulation ===
- MeSH G05.315.095 – chromatin assembly and disassembly
- MeSH G05.315.125 – dosage compensation, genetic
- MeSH G05.315.125.970 – x chromosome inactivation
- MeSH G05.315.200 – down-regulation
- MeSH G05.315.203 – epigenesis, genetic
- MeSH G05.315.207 – epistasis, genetic
- MeSH G05.315.215 – frameshifting, ribosomal
- MeSH G05.315.250 – gene amplification
- MeSH G05.315.290 – gene expression regulation, archaeal
- MeSH G05.315.300 – gene expression regulation, bacterial
- MeSH G05.315.310 – gene expression regulation, developmental
- MeSH G05.315.320 – gene expression regulation, enzymologic
- MeSH G05.315.320.200 – enzyme induction
- MeSH G05.315.320.300 – enzyme repression
- MeSH G05.315.330 – gene expression regulation, fungal
- MeSH G05.315.370 – gene expression regulation, neoplastic
- MeSH G05.315.370.500 – gene expression regulation, leukemic
- MeSH G05.315.375 – gene expression regulation, plant
- MeSH G05.315.385 – gene expression regulation, viral
- MeSH G05.315.410 – gene silencing
- MeSH G05.315.410.790 – rna interference
- MeSH G05.315.425 – genomic imprinting
- MeSH G05.315.670 – protein modification, translational
- MeSH G05.315.670.600 – protein processing, post-translational
- MeSH G05.315.670.600.400 – protein isoprenylation
- MeSH G05.315.670.600.700 – protein splicing
- MeSH G05.315.700 – rna processing, post-transcriptional
- MeSH G05.315.700.225 – rna 3' end processing
- MeSH G05.315.700.225.710 – polyadenylation
- MeSH G05.315.700.250 – rna editing
- MeSH G05.315.700.700 – rna splicing
- MeSH G05.315.700.700.100 – alternative splicing
- MeSH G05.315.700.700.750 – trans-splicing
- MeSH G05.315.800 – trans-activation (genetics)
- MeSH G05.315.850 – up-regulation

=== MeSH G05.330 – gene rearrangement ===
- MeSH G05.330.401 – gene rearrangement, b-lymphocyte
- MeSH G05.330.401.501 – gene rearrangement, b-lymphocyte, heavy chain
- MeSH G05.330.401.501.450 – immunoglobulin class switching
- MeSH G05.330.401.601 – gene rearrangement, b-lymphocyte, light chain
- MeSH G05.330.801 – gene rearrangement, t-lymphocyte
- MeSH G05.330.801.111 – gene rearrangement, alpha-chain t-cell antigen receptor
- MeSH G05.330.801.211 – gene rearrangement, beta-chain t-cell antigen receptor
- MeSH G05.330.801.261 – gene rearrangement, delta-chain t-cell antigen receptor
- MeSH G05.330.801.311 – gene rearrangement, gamma-chain t-cell antigen receptor

=== MeSH G05.600 – mutagenesis ===
- MeSH G05.600.220 – dna repeat expansion
- MeSH G05.600.220.865 – trinucleotide repeat expansion
- MeSH G05.600.315 – gene amplification
- MeSH G05.600.320 – gene duplication
- MeSH G05.600.420 – inversion, chromosome
- MeSH G05.600.550 – mutagenesis, insertional
- MeSH G05.600.620 – nondisjunction, genetic
- MeSH G05.600.800 – sequence deletion
- MeSH G05.600.800.180 – chromosome deletion
- MeSH G05.600.800.320 – gene deletion
- MeSH G05.600.810 – somatic hypermutation, immunoglobulin
- MeSH G05.600.835 – suppression, genetic
- MeSH G05.600.860 – translocation, genetic

=== MeSH G05.760 – recombination, genetic ===
- MeSH G05.760.200 – conjugation, genetic
- MeSH G05.760.210 – crossing over, genetic
- MeSH G05.760.380 – gene conversion
- MeSH G05.760.385 – gene fusion
- MeSH G05.760.385.500 – oncogene fusion
- MeSH G05.760.390 – gene transfer, horizontal
- MeSH G05.760.840 – sister chromatid exchange
- MeSH G05.760.850 – transduction, genetic
- MeSH G05.760.860 – transfection
- MeSH G05.760.860.500 – transformation, bacterial
- MeSH G05.760.865 – transformation, genetic
- MeSH G05.760.865.820 – transformation, bacterial

=== MeSH G05.930 – virus integration ===
- MeSH G05.930.500 – lysogeny

The list continues at List of MeSH codes (G06).
