= DMFT =

DMFT may refer to:

- Dynamical mean-field theory, a method to determine the electronic structure of strongly correlated materials
- Decayed, missing, and filled teeth index, a quantification of dental caries burden
- Doctor of Marriage and Family Therapy, a professional doctorate degree in psychology/counseling
