= List of MeSH codes (F04) =

The following is a partial list of the "F" codes for Medical Subject Headings (MeSH), as defined by the United States National Library of Medicine (NLM).

This list continues the information at List of MeSH codes (F03). Codes following these are found at List of MeSH codes (G01). For other MeSH codes, see List of MeSH codes.

The source for this content is the set of 2006 MeSH Trees from the NLM.

== MeSH F04 – behavioral disciplines and activities ==
=== MeSH F04.096 – behavioral sciences ===
- MeSH F04.096.080 – behavioral medicine
- MeSH F04.096.144 – behavioral research
- MeSH F04.096.208 – ethology
- MeSH F04.096.276 – genetics, behavioral
- MeSH F04.096.276.400 – genetic determinism
- MeSH F04.096.462 – parapsychology
- MeSH F04.096.544 – psychiatry
- MeSH F04.096.544.065 – adolescent psychiatry
- MeSH F04.096.544.090 – biological psychiatry
- MeSH F04.096.544.193 – child psychiatry
- MeSH F04.096.544.215 – community psychiatry
- MeSH F04.096.544.215.508 – preventive psychiatry
- MeSH F04.096.544.335 – forensic psychiatry
- MeSH F04.096.544.335.200 – commitment of mentally ill
- MeSH F04.096.544.335.240 – confidentiality
- MeSH F04.096.544.335.240.270 – duty to warn
- MeSH F04.096.544.335.528 – insanity defense
- MeSH F04.096.544.380 – geriatric psychiatry
- MeSH F04.096.544.480 – military psychiatry
- MeSH F04.096.544.528 – orthopsychiatry
- MeSH F04.096.544.779 – psychoanalysis
- MeSH F04.096.544.830 – psychosomatic medicine
- MeSH F04.096.586 – psycholinguistics
- MeSH F04.096.586.550 – neurolinguistic programming
- MeSH F04.096.628 – psychology
- MeSH F04.096.628.065 – adolescent psychology
- MeSH F04.096.628.193 – child psychology
- MeSH F04.096.628.255 – cognitive science
- MeSH F04.096.628.317 – ethnopsychology
- MeSH F04.096.628.579 – psychology, clinical
- MeSH F04.096.628.629 – psychology, comparative
- MeSH F04.096.628.679 – psychology, educational
- MeSH F04.096.628.729 – psychology, experimental
- MeSH F04.096.628.779 – psychology, industrial
- MeSH F04.096.628.779.900 – time management
- MeSH F04.096.628.808 – psychology, medical
- MeSH F04.096.628.829 – psychology, social
- MeSH F04.096.670 – psychopathology
- MeSH F04.096.712 – psychopharmacology
- MeSH F04.096.753 – psychophysics
- MeSH F04.096.753.628 – psychoacoustics
- MeSH F04.096.753.814 – signal detection (psychology)
- MeSH F04.096.795 – psychophysiology
- MeSH F04.096.795.600 – neuropsychology
- MeSH F04.096.795.650 – psychoneuroimmunology
- MeSH F04.096.837 – sexology
- MeSH F04.096.837.249 – sex counseling
- MeSH F04.096.837.500 – sex education
- MeSH F04.096.879 – social sciences
- MeSH F04.096.879.201 – anthropology
- MeSH F04.096.879.757 – sociology
- MeSH F04.096.879.757.400 – sociology, medical
- MeSH F04.096.939 – sociobiology

=== MeSH F04.408 – mental health services ===
- MeSH F04.408.192 – child guidance
- MeSH F04.408.307 – community mental health services
- MeSH F04.408.413 – counseling
- MeSH F04.408.413.349 – directive counseling
- MeSH F04.408.413.700 – sex counseling
- MeSH F04.408.525 – emergency services, psychiatric
- MeSH F04.408.823 – social work, psychiatric

=== MeSH F04.513 – personality assessment ===
- MeSH F04.513.636 – q-sort

=== MeSH F04.570 – psychiatric somatic therapies ===
- MeSH F04.570.200 – convulsive therapy
- MeSH F04.570.200.583 – electroconvulsive therapy
- MeSH F04.570.400 – orthomolecular therapy
- MeSH F04.570.505 – psychopharmacology
- MeSH F04.570.505.557 – narcotherapy
- MeSH F04.570.630 – psychosurgery

=== MeSH F04.586 – psychiatric status rating scales ===
- MeSH F04.586.083 – Brief Psychiatric Rating Scale
- MeSH F04.586.574 – mental status schedule

=== MeSH F04.669 – psychological techniques ===
- MeSH F04.669.224 – electroshock
- MeSH F04.669.332 – galvanic skin response
- MeSH F04.669.599 – interview, psychological
- MeSH F04.669.817 – reaction time
- MeSH F04.669.817.559 – refractory period, psychological

=== MeSH F04.711 – psychological tests ===
- MeSH F04.711.141 – aptitude tests
- MeSH F04.711.141.493 – intelligence tests
- MeSH F04.711.141.493.225 – stanford-binet test
- MeSH F04.711.141.493.822 – wechsler scales
- MeSH F04.711.400 – language tests
- MeSH F04.711.513 – neuropsychological tests
- MeSH F04.711.513.180 – bender-gestalt test
- MeSH F04.711.513.300 – luria-nebraska neuropsychological battery
- MeSH F04.711.513.838 – trail making test
- MeSH F04.711.647 – personality tests
- MeSH F04.711.647.138 – bender-gestalt test
- MeSH F04.711.647.513 – personality inventory
- MeSH F04.711.647.513.146 – cattell personality factor questionnaire
- MeSH F04.711.647.513.463 – manifest anxiety scale
- MeSH F04.711.647.513.607 – mmpi
- MeSH F04.711.647.513.886 – test anxiety scale
- MeSH F04.711.647.622 – projective techniques
- MeSH F04.711.647.622.341 – ink blot tests
- MeSH F04.711.647.622.341.387 – holtzman inkblot test
- MeSH F04.711.647.622.341.736 – rorschach test
- MeSH F04.711.647.622.851 – thematic apperception test
- MeSH F04.711.647.745 – semantic differential
- MeSH F04.711.647.905 – word association tests
- MeSH F04.711.780 – psychometrics

=== MeSH F04.754 – psychotherapy ===
- MeSH F04.754.035 – aromatherapy
- MeSH F04.754.070 – art therapy
- MeSH F04.754.103 – autogenic training
- MeSH F04.754.137 – behavior therapy
- MeSH F04.754.137.174 – aversive therapy
- MeSH F04.754.137.350 – biofeedback (psychology)
- MeSH F04.754.137.428 – cognitive therapy
- MeSH F04.754.137.506 – desensitization, psychologic
- MeSH F04.754.137.506.325 – implosive therapy
- MeSH F04.754.137.750 – relaxation techniques
- MeSH F04.754.137.750.500 – meditation
- MeSH F04.754.168 – bibliotherapy
- MeSH F04.754.180 – biofeedback (psychology)
- MeSH F04.754.215 – color therapy
- MeSH F04.754.252 – crisis intervention
- MeSH F04.754.278 – dance therapy
- MeSH F04.754.360 – gestalt therapy
- MeSH F04.754.424 – hypnosis
- MeSH F04.754.424.771 – suggestion
- MeSH F04.754.424.771.299 – autosuggestion
- MeSH F04.754.462 – imagery (psychotherapy)
- MeSH F04.754.549 – music therapy
- MeSH F04.754.592 – nondirective therapy
- MeSH F04.754.664 – play therapy
- MeSH F04.754.709 – psychoanalytic therapy
- MeSH F04.754.709.437 – free association
- MeSH F04.754.709.838 – transactional analysis
- MeSH F04.754.720 – psychotherapeutic processes
- MeSH F04.754.720.107 – abreaction
- MeSH F04.754.720.107.333 – catharsis
- MeSH F04.754.720.346 – association
- MeSH F04.754.720.864 – transference (psychology)
- MeSH F04.754.720.864.363 – countertransference (psychology)
- MeSH F04.754.738 – psychotherapy, brief
- MeSH F04.754.766 – psychotherapy, multiple
- MeSH F04.754.785 – psychotherapy, rational-emotive
- MeSH F04.754.804 – reality therapy
- MeSH F04.754.864 – socioenvironmental therapy
- MeSH F04.754.864.392 – milieu therapy
- MeSH F04.754.864.392.701 – therapeutic community
- MeSH F04.754.864.581 – psychotherapy, group
- MeSH F04.754.864.581.136 – couples therapy
- MeSH F04.754.864.581.273 – family therapy
- MeSH F04.754.864.581.550 – marital therapy
- MeSH F04.754.864.581.679 – psychodrama
- MeSH F04.754.864.581.679.653 – role playing
- MeSH F04.754.864.581.813 – sensitivity training groups
- MeSH F04.754.864.696 – residential treatment

=== MeSH F04.824 – schizophrenic psychology ===
The list continues at List of MeSH codes (G01).
