= List of MeSH codes (F03) =

The following is a partial list of the "F" codes for Medical Subject Headings (MeSH), as defined by the United States National Library of Medicine (NLM).

This list continues the information at List of MeSH codes (F02). Codes following these are found at List of MeSH codes (F04). For other MeSH codes, see List of MeSH codes.

The source for this content is the set of 2006 MeSH Trees from the NLM.

== MeSH F03 – mental disorders ==
=== MeSH F03.080 – anxiety disorders ===
- MeSH F03.080.100 – agoraphobia
- MeSH F03.080.500 – neurocirculatory asthenia
- MeSH F03.080.600 – obsessive-compulsive disorder
- MeSH F03.080.700 – panic disorder
- MeSH F03.080.725 – phobic disorders
- MeSH F03.080.931 – stress disorders, traumatic
- MeSH F03.080.931.249 – combat disorders
- MeSH F03.080.931.374 – stress disorders, traumatic, acute
- MeSH F03.080.931.500 – stress disorders, post-traumatic

=== MeSH F03.087 – delirium, dementia, amnestic, cognitive disorders ===
- MeSH F03.087.200 – amnesia
- MeSH F03.087.200.125 – alcohol amnestic disorder
- MeSH F03.087.200.125.500 – korsakoff syndrome
- MeSH F03.087.200.137 – amnesia, anterograde
- MeSH F03.087.200.150 – amnesia, retrograde
- MeSH F03.087.200.800 – amnesia, transient global
- MeSH F03.087.250 – cognitive disorder
- MeSH F03.087.250.100 – auditory processing disorder
- MeSH F03.087.250.400 – huntington disease
- MeSH F03.087.300 – Disorders of consciousness
- MeSH F03.087.350 – delirium
- MeSH F03.087.400 – dementia
- MeSH F03.087.400.050 – aids dementia complex
- MeSH F03.087.400.100 – alzheimer disease
- MeSH F03.087.400.125 – primary progressive aphasia
- MeSH F03.087.400.300 – creutzfeldt-jakob syndrome
- MeSH F03.087.400.350 – dementia, vascular
- MeSH F03.087.400.350.400 – dementia, multi-infarct
- MeSH F03.087.400.390 – huntington disease
- MeSH F03.087.400.431 – Klüver-Bucy syndrome
- MeSH F03.087.400.512 – lewy body disease
- MeSH F03.087.400.675 – pick disease of the brain
- MeSH F03.087.700 – Alexia (condition)
- MeSH F03.087.700.500 – alexia, pure

=== MeSH F03.300 – dissociative disorders ===
- MeSH F03.300.500 – multiple personality disorder

=== MeSH F03.375 – eating disorders ===
- MeSH F03.375.100 – anorexia nervosa
- MeSH F03.375.250 – bulimia nervosa
- MeSH F03.375.300 – coprophagia
- MeSH F03.375.600 – pica

=== MeSH F03.400 – factitious disorders ===
- MeSH F03.400.600 – munchausen syndrome

=== MeSH F03.500 – impulse control disorders ===
- MeSH F03.500.300 – firesetting behavior
- MeSH F03.500.400 – gambling
- MeSH F03.500.800 – trichotillomania

=== MeSH F03.550 – mental disorders diagnosed in childhood ===
- MeSH F03.550.075 – anxiety, separation
- MeSH F03.550.150 – attention deficit and disruptive behavior disorders
- MeSH F03.550.150.150 – attention deficit disorder with hyperactivity
- MeSH F03.550.150.300 – conduct disorder
- MeSH F03.550.300 – child behavior disorders
- MeSH F03.550.325 – child development disorders, pervasive
- MeSH F03.550.325.100 – asperger syndrome
- MeSH F03.550.325.125 – autistic disorder
- MeSH F03.550.325.412 – rett syndrome
- MeSH F03.550.325.700 – schizophrenia, childhood
- MeSH F03.550.350 – communication disorders
- MeSH F03.550.350.500 – learning disorders
- MeSH F03.550.350.500.200 – dyslexia
- MeSH F03.550.350.500.200.500 – dyslexia, acquired
- MeSH F03.550.362 – developmental disabilities
- MeSH F03.550.375 – elimination disorders
- MeSH F03.550.375.300 – encopresis
- MeSH F03.550.375.400 – enuresis
- MeSH F03.550.400 – feeding and eating disorders of childhood
- MeSH F03.550.400.600 – pica
- MeSH F03.550.450 – learning disorders
- MeSH F03.550.450.400 – dyslexia
- MeSH F03.550.450.400.500 – dyslexia, acquired
- MeSH F03.550.600 – mental retardation
- MeSH F03.550.650 – motor skills disorders
- MeSH F03.550.700 – mutism
- MeSH F03.550.750 – reactive attachment disorder
- MeSH F03.550.787 – stereotypic movement disorder
- MeSH F03.550.825 – tic disorders
- MeSH F03.550.825.850 – tourette syndrome

=== MeSH F03.600 – mood disorders ===
- MeSH F03.600.150 – affective disorders, psychotic
- MeSH F03.600.150.150 – bipolar disorder
- MeSH F03.600.150.150.300 – cyclothymic disorder
- MeSH F03.600.300 – depressive disorder
- MeSH F03.600.300.350 – depression, postpartum
- MeSH F03.600.300.375 – depressive disorder, major
- MeSH F03.600.300.400 – dysthymic disorder
- MeSH F03.600.300.700 – seasonal affective disorder

=== MeSH F03.675 – personality disorders ===
- MeSH F03.675.050 – antisocial personality disorder
- MeSH F03.675.100 – borderline personality disorder
- MeSH F03.675.150 – compulsive personality disorder
- MeSH F03.675.200 – dependent personality disorder
- MeSH F03.675.400 – histrionic personality disorder
- MeSH F03.675.400.500 – hysteria
- MeSH F03.675.600 – paranoid personality disorder
- MeSH F03.675.625 – passive-aggressive personality disorder
- MeSH F03.675.700 – schizoid personality disorder
- MeSH F03.675.725 – schizotypal personality disorder

=== MeSH F03.700 – schizophrenia and disorders with psychotic features ===
- MeSH F03.700.300 – capgras syndrome
- MeSH F03.700.450 – paranoid disorders
- MeSH F03.700.675 – psychotic disorders
- MeSH F03.700.675.600 – psychoses, substance-induced
- MeSH F03.700.675.600.750 – psychoses, alcoholic
- MeSH F03.700.750 – schizophrenia
- MeSH F03.700.750.300 – schizophrenia, catatonic
- MeSH F03.700.750.350 – schizophrenia, disorganized
- MeSH F03.700.750.600 – schizophrenia, paranoid
- MeSH F03.700.750.700 – shared paranoid disorder

=== MeSH F03.800 – sexual and gender disorders ===
- MeSH F03.800.800 – sexual dysfunctions, psychological
- MeSH F03.800.800.199 – dyspareunia
- MeSH F03.800.800.400 – impotence
- MeSH F03.800.800.600 – paraphilias
- MeSH F03.800.800.600.300 – exhibitionism
- MeSH F03.800.800.600.350 – fetishism (psychiatric)
- MeSH F03.800.800.600.500 – masochism
- MeSH F03.800.800.600.600 – pedophilia
- MeSH F03.800.800.600.700 – sadism
- MeSH F03.800.800.600.800 – transvestism
- MeSH F03.800.800.600.900 – voyeurism
- MeSH F03.800.800.800 – transsexualism
- MeSH F03.800.800.900 – vaginismus

=== MeSH F03.870 – sleep disorders ===
- MeSH F03.870.400 – dyssomnias
- MeSH F03.870.400.099 – sleep deprivation
- MeSH F03.870.400.200 – sleep disorders, circadian rhythm
- MeSH F03.870.400.200.500 – jet lag syndrome
- MeSH F03.870.400.800 – sleep disorders, intrinsic
- MeSH F03.870.400.800.200 – disorders of excessive somnolence
- MeSH F03.870.400.800.200.400 – hypersomnolence, idiopathic
- MeSH F03.870.400.800.200.500 – kleine-levin syndrome
- MeSH F03.870.400.800.200.750 – narcolepsy
- MeSH F03.870.400.800.200.750.500 – cataplexy
- MeSH F03.870.400.800.700 – restless legs syndrome
- MeSH F03.870.400.800.800 – sleep initiation and maintenance disorders
- MeSH F03.870.664 – parasomnias
- MeSH F03.870.664.627 – nocturnal paroxysmal dystonia
- MeSH F03.870.664.633 – rem sleep parasomnias
- MeSH F03.870.664.633.700 – rem sleep behavior disorder
- MeSH F03.870.664.633.800 – sleep paralysis
- MeSH F03.870.664.634 – restless legs syndrome
- MeSH F03.870.664.635 – sleep arousal disorders
- MeSH F03.870.664.635.600 – night terrors
- MeSH F03.870.664.635.700 – somnambulism
- MeSH F03.870.664.637 – sleep bruxism
- MeSH F03.870.664.700 – sleep-wake transition disorders

=== MeSH F03.875 – somatoform disorders ===
- MeSH F03.875.300 – conversion disorder
- MeSH F03.875.450 – hypochondriasis
- MeSH F03.875.600 – neurasthenia

=== MeSH F03.900 – substance-related disorders ===
- MeSH F03.900.100 – alcohol-related disorders
- MeSH F03.900.100.050 – alcohol amnestic disorder
- MeSH F03.900.100.050.500 – korsakoff syndrome
- MeSH F03.900.100.100 – alcohol withdrawal delirium
- MeSH F03.900.100.300 – alcoholic intoxication
- MeSH F03.900.100.350 – alcoholism
- MeSH F03.900.100.750 – psychoses, alcoholic
- MeSH F03.900.100.875 – wernicke encephalopathy
- MeSH F03.900.225 – amphetamine-related disorders
- MeSH F03.900.300 – cocaine-related disorders
- MeSH F03.900.635 – marijuana abuse
- MeSH F03.900.650 – neonatal abstinence syndrome
- MeSH F03.900.675 – opioid-related disorders
- MeSH F03.900.675.400 – heroin dependence
- MeSH F03.900.675.600 – morphine dependence
- MeSH F03.900.700 – phencyclidine abuse
- MeSH F03.900.746 – psychoses, substance-induced
- MeSH F03.900.793 – substance abuse, intravenous
- MeSH F03.900.825 – substance withdrawal syndrome
- MeSH F03.900.825.500 – alcohol withdrawal delirium
- MeSH F03.900.912 – tobacco use disorder

The list continues at List of MeSH codes (F04).
