= Zygotene =

Second stage of prophase I in Meiosis

Zygotene (from Greek for "paired threads") is the second stage of prophase I during meiosis, the specialized cell division that reduces the chromosome number by half to produce haploid gametes. It follows the Leptotene stage and is followed by Pachytene stage.

== Synapsis completion ==
The key event during zygotene is the completion of synapsis between homologous chromosomes. Synapsis began during the previous leptotene stage, with the homologous chromosomes starting to pair together and associate lengthwise, facilitated by the synaptonemal complex protein structure.

In zygotene, the synaptonemal complex forms more extensively between the paired chromosomes. It zips the homologs together along their entire length, with the lateral elements of the complex associated with each chromosome and the central region holding them together. This allows intimate pairing and genetic recombination events.

== Chromosome condensation ==
The chromosomes continue condensing during zygotene into distinct threadlike structures. Each chromosome now appears thicker as the sister chromatids are closely aligned.

== Recombination nodules ==
As synapsis completes, proteinaceous recombination nodules begin to appear along the synaptonemal complex between the homologous chromosomes. These represent sites of genetic crossover events, where exchange of chromosomal segments occurs between the non-sister chromatids.

Key recombination proteins like MLH1/3 and MSH4/5 mark the sites of crossover formation. The number and positioning of these crossovers is regulated to ensure at least one crossover per chromosome arm for proper segregation in later meiotic stages.

== Transition to pachytene ==
Once synapsis and crossing over are complete, the cell transitions to the pachytene stage of prophase I. Pachytene features fully condensed and paired chromosomes along their length, with distinctly visible recombination nodules.

== Importance ==
The zygotene stage is crucial for genetic recombination and proper chromosome segregation in meiosis. Defects in synapsis, recombination, or crossover regulation can lead to aneuploidy and chromosomal abnormalities in gametes.
