= List of MeSH codes (A01) =

The following is a partial list of the "A" codes for Medical Subject Headings (MeSH), as defined by the United States National Library of Medicine (NLM). Codes following these are found at List of MeSH codes (A02). For other MeSH codes, see List of MeSH codes.

Authoritative sources for this content are the MeSH Browser and MeSH SPARQL Explorer.

== MeSH A01 – body regions ==
=== MeSH A01.236 – breast ===
- MeSH A01.236.249 – mammary glands, human
- MeSH A01.236.500 – nipples

=== MeSH A01.378 – extremities ===
- MeSH A01.378.100 – amputation stumps
- MeSH A01.378.610 – lower extremity
  - MeSH A01.378.610.050 – ankle
  - MeSH A01.378.610.100 – buttocks
  - MeSH A01.378.610.250 – foot
    - MeSH A01.378.610.250.300 – forefoot, human
      - MeSH A01.378.610.250.300.480 – metatarsus
      - MeSH A01.378.610.250.300.792 – toes
        - MeSH A01.378.610.250.300.792.380 – hallux
    - MeSH A01.378.610.250.510 – heel
  - MeSH A01.378.610.400 – hip
  - MeSH A01.378.610.450 – knee
  - MeSH A01.378.610.500 – leg
  - MeSH A01.378.610.750 – thigh
- MeSH A01.378.800 – upper extremity
  - MeSH A01.378.800.075 – arm
  - MeSH A01.378.800.090 – axilla
  - MeSH A01.378.800.420 – elbow
  - MeSH A01.378.800.585 – forearm
  - MeSH A01.378.800.667 – hand
    - MeSH A01.378.800.667.430 – fingers
      - MeSH A01.378.800.667.430.705 – thumb
    - MeSH A01.378.800.667.572 – metacarpus
  - MeSH A01.378.800.750 – shoulder
  - MeSH A01.378.800.875 – wrist

=== MeSH A01.456 – head ===
- MeSH A01.456.313 – ear
- MeSH A01.456.505 – face
  - MeSH A01.456.505.173 – cheek
  - MeSH A01.456.505.259 – chin
  - MeSH A01.456.505.420 – eye
    - MeSH A01.456.505.420.338 – eyebrows
    - MeSH A01.456.505.420.504 – eyelids
      - MeSH A01.456.505.420.504.421 – eyelashes
  - MeSH A01.456.505.580 – forehead
  - MeSH A01.456.505.631 – mouth
    - MeSH A01.456.505.631.515 – lip
  - MeSH A01.456.505.733 – nose
  - MeSH A01.456.505.682 - nasolabial fold
  - MeSH A01.456.505.750 – parotid region
  - MeSH A01.456.505.875 - Superficial muscular aponeurotic system
- MeSH A01.456.810 – scalp
- MeSH A01.456.830 – skull base
  - MeSH A01.456.830.150 – cranial fossa, anterior
  - MeSH A01.456.830.165 – cranial fossa, middle
  - MeSH A01.456.830.200 – cranial fossa, posterior
    - MeSH A01.456.830.200.500 – Jugular foramina
  - MeSH A01.456.830.600 – Infratemporal fossa
  - MeSH A01.456.830.800 – Parapharyngeal space

=== MeSH A01.598 – neck ===
- MeSH A01.598.250 – Parapharyngeal space
- MeSH A01.598.500 – Superficial muscular aponeurotic system

=== MeSH A01.923 – Torso ===
- MeSH A01.923.047 – abdomen
  - MeSH A01.923.047.025 – abdominal cavity
    - MeSH A01.923.047.025.600 – peritoneum
      - MeSH A01.923.047.025.600.225 – Douglas' Pouch
      - MeSH A01.923.047.025.600.451 – Mesentery
        - MeSH A01.923.047.025.600.451.535 – Mesocolon
      - MeSH A01.923.047.025.600.573 – Omentum
      - MeSH A01.923.047.025.600.678 – peritoneal cavity
      - MeSH A01.923.047.025.600.700 – peritoneal stomata
    - MeSH A01.923.047.025.750 – retroperitoneal space
  - MeSH A01.923.047.050 – abdominal wall
  - MeSH A01.923.047.365 – groin
  - MeSH A01.923.047.412 – inguinal canal
  - MeSH A01.923.047.849 – umbilicus
- MeSH A01.923.112 – abdominal core
  - MeSH A01.923.112.125 – abdominal wall
  - MeSH A01.923.112.250 – diaphragm
  - MeSH A01.923.112.500 – pelvic floor
- MeSH A01.923.176 – back
  - MeSH A01.923.176.519 – lumbosacral region
  - MeSH A01.923.176.780 – sacrococcygeal region
- MeSH A01.923.600 – pelvis
  - MeSH A01.923.600.500 – lesser pelvis
  - MeSH A01.923.600.600 – pelvic floor
- MeSH A01.923.761 – thorax
  - MeSH A01.923.800 – thoracic cavity
    - MeSH A01.923.800.500 – Mediastinum
    - MeSH A01.923.800.650 – pleural cavity
  - MeSH A01.911.850 – thoracic wall

=== MeSH A01.941 – Transplants ===
- MeSH A01.941.500 – Allografts
  - MeSH A01.941.500.500 – Allogeneic cells
- MeSH A01.941.750 – Autografts
- MeSH A01.941.812 – Bone-patellar tendon-bone grafts
- MeSH A01.941.843 – Composite tissue allografts
- MeSH A01.941.875 – Heterografts
- MeSH A01.941.937 – Isografts
