= List of MeSH codes (G01) =

The following is a partial list of the "G" codes for Medical Subject Headings (MeSH), as defined by the United States National Library of Medicine (NLM).

This list continues the information at List of MeSH codes (F04). Codes following these are found at List of MeSH codes (G02). For other MeSH codes, see List of MeSH codes.

The source for this content is the set of 2006 MeSH Trees from the NLM.

== MeSH G01 – biological sciences ==
=== MeSH G01.100 – anatomy ===
- MeSH G01.100.091 – anatomy, artistic
- MeSH G01.100.154 – anatomy, comparative
- MeSH G01.100.185 – anatomy, cross-sectional
- MeSH G01.100.185.900 – visible human project
- MeSH G01.100.216 – anatomy, regional
- MeSH G01.100.279 – anatomy, veterinary
- MeSH G01.100.433 – cytology
- MeSH G01.100.529 – embryology
- MeSH G01.100.529.500 – teratology
- MeSH G01.100.656 – histology
- MeSH G01.100.656.469 – histology, comparative
- MeSH G01.100.700 – neuroanatomy

=== MeSH G01.201 – biochemistry ===
- MeSH G01.201.344 – histocytochemistry
- MeSH G01.201.344.512 – immunohistochemistry
- MeSH G01.201.486 – immunochemistry
- MeSH G01.201.486.512 – immunohistochemistry
- MeSH G01.201.687 – neurochemistry
- MeSH G01.201.700 – proteomics

=== MeSH G01.273 – biology ===
- MeSH G01.273.118 – botany
- MeSH G01.273.118.299 – ethnobotany
- MeSH G01.273.118.598 – pharmacognosy
- MeSH G01.273.180 – computational biology
- MeSH G01.273.180.800 – systems biology
- MeSH G01.273.200 – developmental biology
- MeSH G01.273.200.350 – embryology
- MeSH G01.273.200.350.500 – teratology
- MeSH G01.273.248 – ecology
- MeSH G01.273.295 – exobiology
- MeSH G01.273.343 – genetics
- MeSH G01.273.343.180 – cytogenetics
- MeSH G01.273.343.249 – genetic research
- MeSH G01.273.343.249.400 – Human Genome Project
- MeSH G01.273.343.290 – genetics, behavioral
- MeSH G01.273.343.290.400 – genetic determinism
- MeSH G01.273.343.315 – genetics, medical
- MeSH G01.273.343.315.368 – eugenics
- MeSH G01.273.343.315.400 – genetic services
- MeSH G01.273.343.315.400.400 – genetic counseling
- MeSH G01.273.343.315.400.430 – genetic screening
- MeSH G01.273.343.330 – genetics, microbial
- MeSH G01.273.343.335 – genetics, population
- MeSH G01.273.343.350 – genomics
- MeSH G01.273.343.350.700 – proteomics
- MeSH G01.273.343.420 – immunogenetics
- MeSH G01.273.343.595 – molecular biology
- MeSH G01.273.343.595.300 – epidemiology, molecular
- MeSH G01.273.343.750 – pharmacogenetics
- MeSH G01.273.343.750.850 – toxicogenetics
- MeSH G01.273.343.800 – radiation genetics
- MeSH G01.273.368 – laboratory animal science
- MeSH G01.273.476 – marine biology
- MeSH G01.273.540 – microbiology
- MeSH G01.273.540.177 – bacteriology
- MeSH G01.273.540.274 – environmental microbiology
- MeSH G01.273.540.274.110 – air microbiology
- MeSH G01.273.540.274.332 – food microbiology
- MeSH G01.273.540.274.555 – soil microbiology
- MeSH G01.273.540.274.777 – water microbiology
- MeSH G01.273.540.330 – genetics, microbial
- MeSH G01.273.540.460 – industrial microbiology
- MeSH G01.273.540.553 – mycology
- MeSH G01.273.540.859 – virology
- MeSH G01.273.595 – molecular biology
- MeSH G01.273.595.300 – epidemiology, molecular
- MeSH G01.273.602 – natural history
- MeSH G01.273.610 – neurobiology
- MeSH G01.273.688 – parasitology
- MeSH G01.273.688.500 – food parasitology
- MeSH G01.273.688.750 – parasitic sensitivity tests
- MeSH G01.273.738 – photobiology
- MeSH G01.273.789 – radiobiology
- MeSH G01.273.866 – sociobiology
- MeSH G01.273.943 – zoology
- MeSH G01.273.943.409 – entomology

=== MeSH G01.344 – biophysics ===
- MeSH G01.344.310 – bionics
- MeSH G01.344.528 – electrophysiology
- MeSH G01.344.552 – hemorheology

=== MeSH G01.550 – biotechnology ===
- MeSH G01.550.100 – biomimetics

=== MeSH G01.610 – neurosciences ===
- MeSH G01.610.060 – neuroanatomy
- MeSH G01.610.080 – neurobiology
- MeSH G01.610.110 – neurochemistry
- MeSH G01.610.160 – neuroendocrinology
- MeSH G01.610.208 – neuropharmacology
- MeSH G01.610.268 – neurophysiology

=== MeSH G01.703 – pharmacology ===
- MeSH G01.703.015 – ethnopharmacology
- MeSH G01.703.030 – neuropharmacology
- MeSH G01.703.045 – pharmacoepidemiology
- MeSH G01.703.052 – pharmacogenetics
- MeSH G01.703.052.850 – toxicogenetics
- MeSH G01.703.060 – pharmacognosy
- MeSH G01.703.152 – pharmacology, clinical
- MeSH G01.703.546 – psychopharmacology
- MeSH G01.703.795 – toxicology
- MeSH G01.703.795.850 – toxicogenetics

=== MeSH G01.782 – physiology ===
- MeSH G01.782.236 – electrophysiology
- MeSH G01.782.323 – endocrinology
- MeSH G01.782.323.200 – neuroendocrinology
- MeSH G01.782.562 – neurophysiology
- MeSH G01.782.688 – physiology, comparative
- MeSH G01.782.795 – psychophysiology
- MeSH G01.782.795.110 – neuropsychology
- MeSH G01.782.795.180 – psychoneuroimmunology

The list continues at List of MeSH codes (G02).
