= Leptotene stage =

Cell cycle phase in meiosis I

The leptotene stage, also known as leptonema, is the first of five substages of prophase I during meiosis, the specialized cell division that reduces the chromosome number by half to produce haploid gametes in sexually reproducing organisms.

== Terminology ==
The term "leptonema" derives from Greek words meaning "thin threads". A cell destined to become a gamete enters the leptotene stage after its chromosomes are duplicated during interphase.

== Chromosome condensation ==
During the leptotene stage, the duplicated chromosomes - each consisting of two sister chromatids - condense from diffuse chromatin into long, thin strands that are more visible within the nucleoplasm (nucleus contents). The chromosomes become visible as thin threadlike structures known as leptonema under a light microscope.

Each chromosome consists of two identical sister chromatids held together by cohesin proteins along the entire length, connected at the centromere region. As the chromosomes condense, the nuclear envelope starts to fragment, and the nucleolus disperses as the cell prepares for division.

== Chromosome attachment and bouquet formation ==
During this stage, the chromosomes attach themselves by their ends (telomeres) to the inner membrane of the nuclear envelope. At the transition to the zygotene stage, the telomeres usually aggregate at a sector of the nuclear envelope, thereby forming a "meiotic bouquet" arrangement.

== Synapsis initiation ==
A key event is the initiation of synapsis between homologous chromosomes, which carry the same genetic information but may have different allelic variations. The homologous chromosomes begin pairing and association along their lengths, facilitated by lateral (axial) elements of the synaptonemal complex protein structure that forms between the homologs.

The synaptonemal complex consists of two lateral elements associated with each homolog, and a central region where they are held together. As synapsis begins, the chromosomes adopt a more extended configuration to expose the DNA for pairing.

== Genetic recombination ==
The leptotene stage also sees the initiation of genetic recombination between homologs. This involves programmed DNA double-strand breaks and their repair to generate crossovers between non-sister chromatids of homologous pairs.

Proteins like SPO11 generate the breaks, while strand exchange proteins like RAD51 and DMC1 facilitate repair and exchange of genetic material. Recombination continues through zygotene as synapsis completes, generating new genetic diversity.

== DNA damage response ==
Studies in male mouse meiosis have shown that after DNA damaging treatments like gamma irradiation, two types of repair responses occur depending on the meiotic stage:

- From leptotene to early pachytene, exogenous DNA damage triggers widespread presence of the repair protein gammaH2AX in the nucleus, associated with homologous recombination repair mediated by DMC1 and RAD51.
- From mid-pachytene to diplotene, the predominant repair pathway shifts to non-homologous end joining.

== Transition ==
Leptotene is followed by the zygotene stage, where synapsis between homologous chromosomes progresses further and the chromosomes continue condensing.

== See also ==
Synizesis (biology)
