= Synizesis (biology) =

Synizesis refers to a phenomenon sometimes observed in one of the subphases of meiosis. This phenomenon, sometimes referred to as a "synizetic knot", and contrasted with the chromosome "bouquet" more typically observed, is characterized by the localization of the meiotic chromosomes in a tight clump on one side of the nucleus. The term synizesis seems to have been coined by Clarence Erwin McClung in 1905.

The synizetic knot (Synizesis) was later found to be a technical artifact induced by the feature of strong acidic fixatives used during that time (e.g., Flemming's strong fixative) to precipitate the thread-like delicate chromosomes of the Leptotene stage of first meiotic prophase into a dark staining knot.
