= Stomatognathic system =

Anatomical system including the teeth, jaw and its muscles

The stomatognathic system is an anatomical system comprising the teeth, jaws, and associated soft tissues. It was formerly called the stomognathic system.

Stomatognathic diseases are treated by dentists, maxillofacial surgeons, ear, nose, and throat specialists, speech therapists, occupational therapists, myofunctional therapists, and physical therapists.
