= Form perception =

Visual recognition of a pattern or shape

Form perception is the recognition of visual elements of objects, specifically those to do with shapes, patterns and previously identified important characteristics. An object is perceived by the retina as a two-dimensional image, but the image can vary for the same object in terms of the context with which it is viewed, the apparent size of the object, the angle from which it is viewed, how illuminated it is, as well as where it resides in the field of vision. Despite the fact that each instance of observing an object leads to a unique retinal response pattern, the visual processing in the brain is capable of recognizing these experiences as analogous, allowing invariant object recognition. Visual processing occurs in a hierarchy with the lowest levels recognizing lines and contours, and slightly higher levels performing tasks such as completing boundaries and recognizing contour combinations. The highest levels integrate the perceived information to recognize an entire object. Essentially object recognition is the ability to assign labels to objects in order to categorize and identify them, thus distinguishing one object from another. During visual processing information is not created, but rather reformatted in a way that draws out the most detailed information of the stimulus.

== Physiology ==
Form perception is a demanding task for the brain because a retina has a significant blind spot and retinal veins that obstruct light from reaching cells that detect light, or photoreceptor cells. The brain handles the blind spots through boundary processes, includes perceptual grouping, boundary completion, and figure-ground separation, and through surface processing, including compensation for variable illumination (“discounting the illuminant”), and filling blank areas with the surviving illuminant-discounted signals.

In addition to photoreceptors, the eye requires a properly functioning lens, retina, and an undamaged optic nerve to recognize form. Light travels through the lens, hits the retina, activates the appropriate photoreceptors, depending on available light, which convert the light into an electrical signal that travels along the optic nerve to the lateral geniculate nucleus of the thalamus and then to the primary visual cortex. In the cortex, the adult brain processes information such as lines, orientation, and color. These inputs are integrated in the occipito-temporal cortex where a representation of the object as a whole is created. Visual information continues to be processed in the posterior parietal cortex, also known as the dorsal stream, where the representation of an object’s shape is formed using motion-based cues. It is believed that simultaneously information is processed in the anterior temporal cortex, also known as the ventral stream, where object recognition, identification and naming occur. In the process of recognizing an object, both the dorsal and ventral streams are active, but the ventral stream is more important in discriminating between and recognizing objects. The dorsal stream contributes to object recognition only when two objects have similar shapes and the images are degraded. Observed latency in activation of different parts of the brain supports the idea of hierarchal processing of visual stimuli, with object representations progressing from simple to complex.

== Development ==
By five months of age infants are capable of using line junction information to perceive three-D images, including depth and shape, like adults are able. However, there are differences between younger infants and adults in the ability to use motion and color cues to discriminate between two objects. Visual information then continues to be processed in the posterior parietal cortex, also known as the dorsal stream, where the representation of an objects shape is formed using motion-based cues. The identification of differences between the infant and adult brain make it clear that there is either functional reorganization of the infant’s cortex or simply age related differences in which the breed impulses have been observed in infants. Although the infant brain is not identical to the adult brain, it is similar with areas of specialization and a hierarchy of processing. However, adult abilities to perceive form from stationary viewing are not fully understood.

== Dysfunction ==
Dysfunctions in distinguishing differences in sizes and shapes of objects can have many causes, including brain injury, stroke, epilepsy, and oxygen deprivation. Lesions on the brain that develop as a result of injury or illness impair object recognition. Regions that specifically lead to deficits in object recognition when a lesion is present include the right lateral fusiform gyrus and the ventrolateral occipito-temporal cortex. These areas are crucial to the processing of shape and contour information, which is the basis for object recognition. Although there is evidence to support that damage to the areas mentioned leads to deficits in object recognition, brain damage, regardless of the cause, typically is extensive and present on both halves of the brain, complicating the identification of key structures.[12] Although most damage cannot be undone, there is evidence of reorganization in the unaffected areas of the affected hemisphere, making it possible for patients to regain some abilities.

Dysfunctions in form perception occur in several areas that involve visual processing, which is how visual information is interpreted. These dysfunctions have nothing to do with actual vision but rather affect how the brain understands what the eye sees. Problems can occur in the areas of visual closure, visual-spatial relationships, visual memory, and visual tracking. After identifying the specific visual problem that exists, intervention can include eye exercises, work with computer programs, neurotherapy, physical activities, and academic adjustments.

=== Injury and illness ===
Potential injuries to the brain include but are not limited to stroke, oxygen deprivation, blunt force trauma, and surgical injuries. When patients have lesions on their brain that develop as a result of injury or illness, such as multiple sclerosis or epilepsy, it is possible that they may have impaired object recognition which can manifest in the form of many different agnosias. Similar deficits have also been observed adults that have suffered blunt force trauma, strokes, severe carbon monoxide poisoning as well as in adults that have surgical damage following removal of tumors. Deficits have also been observed in children with types of epilepsy that do not lead to the formation of lesions. It is believed that in these cases the seizures cause a functional disruption that is capable of interfering with the processing of objects. Regions that specifically lead to deficits in object recognition when a lesion is present include the right lateral fusiform gyrus and the ventrolateral or ventromedial occipito-temporal cortex. These structures have all been identified as being crucial to the processing of shape and contour information, which is the basis for object recognition. Although people with damage to these structures are not able to properly recognize objects, they are still capable of discerning the movement of objects. Only lesions in the parietal lobe have been associated with deficits in identifying the location of an object. Although there is strong evidence to support that damage to the above-mentioned areas leads to deficits in object recognition, brain damage, regardless of the cause, is typically extensive and present on both halves of the brain, complicating the identification of key structures. Although most damage cannot be undone, there is evidence of reorganization in the unaffected areas of the affected hemisphere, making it possible for patients to regain some function.

=== Aging ===
Whether or not visual form learning is retained in older humans is unknown. Studies prove that training causes improvement in form perception in both young and old adults. Learning to integrate local elements is negatively affected by age, however. Advancing age hinders the ability to process stimuli efficiently to identify objects. More specifically, recognizing the most basic visual components of an object takes a lot longer. Since the time it takes to recognize the object-parts is expanded, the recognition of the object itself is also delayed. Recognition of partially blocked objects also slows down as we age In order to recognize an object that is partially obscured we need to make perceptual inferences based on the contours and borders that we can see. This is something that most young adults are able to do, but it slows down with age. In general, aging causes a decrease in the processing capabilities of the central nervous system, which delays the very complex process of form perception.

== See also ==
- Gestalt psychology
- Neurology
- Visual appearance
