= Narcotherapy =

- MeSH: D009291

Narcotherapy is a form of therapy originating in China that disables the body or one part temporarily by drugs or acupuncture, which is usually used in surgical operations.

== History ==
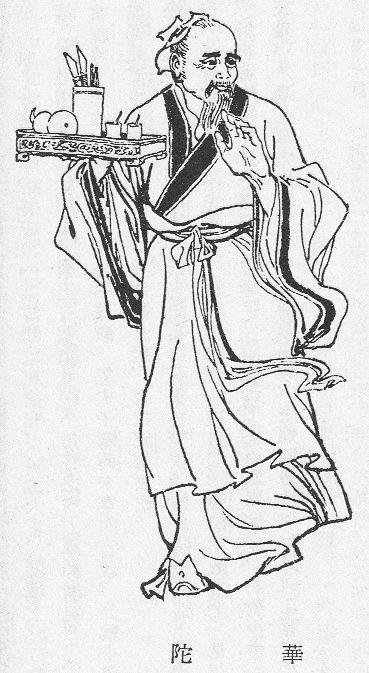
Hua Tuo

As early as the Spring and Autumn and the Warring States periods (770–221 BC), some Chinese doctors had known and recorded the anesthesia functions of some drugs. The doctor Hua Tuo of the Eastern Han Dynasty, on the basis of carefully studying ancient books, went to the mountains and plains to collect herbs with anesthesia function, such as Jimsonweed, which were made into narcotic drugs after being roasted and processed.

One day, people, carried a seriously ill patient to Hua Tuo. He let the patient drink the drug then opened his abdominal cavity and cleared away his rotten intestines, completing the operation while the patient felt no pain. This operation was the earliest recorded large-scale laparotomy both in China and in the world.
