= Clinical Nursing Research =

- Discipline: Nursing
- Language: English
- Edited by: Melissa D. Pinto

Publication details
- History: 1992-present
- Publisher: SAGE Publications
- Frequency: 8/year
- Impact factor: 1.7 (2023)

Standard abbreviations
- ISO 4: Clin. Nurs. Res.

Indexing
- ISSN: 1054-7738
- OCLC no.: 645295681

Links
- Journal homepage; Online access; Online archive

Clinical Nursing Research is a peer-reviewed nursing journal covering the field of clinical nursing. The editor-in-chief is Melissa D. Pinto (Mayo Clinic). It was established in 1992 and is published by SAGE Publications eight times a year.

== Abstracting and indexing ==
The journal is abstracted and indexed in:

- Academic Premier
- Current Contents/Social & Behavioral Sciences
- Science Citation Index
- Social Sciences Citation Index
- Scopus

According to the Journal Citation Reports, the journal has a 2023 impact factor of 1.7.
