= Pachytene =

Third stage of Prophase I of Meiosis

The pachytene stage (/ˈpækɪtiːn/ PAK-i-teen; from Greek words meaning "thick threads".), also known as pachynema, is the third stage of prophase I during meiosis, the specialized cell division that reduces chromosome number by half to produce haploid gametes. It follows the zygotene stage and is followed by the stage diplotene.

== Synapsed chromosomes ==
During pachytene, the homologous chromosomes are fully synapsed along their lengths by the completed synaptonemal complex protein structure formed in the previous stages. This holds the homologous closely paired, allowing intimate DNA interactions.

== Chromosome condensation ==
The chromosomes reach their highest level of condensation during pachytene. Each chromosome consists of two closely associated sister chromatids along their entire length. The chromosomes appear as distinct, well-defined threadlike structures under the microscope. Sex chromosomes, however, are not wholly identical, and only exchange information over a small region of homology called the pseudoautosomal region.

== Recombination nodules ==
Multiple recombination nodules are distinctly visible along the paired homologous chromosomes. These proteinaceous structures mark the sites of genetic crossover events between the non-sister chromatids that were initiated during zygotene.

Proteins like MLH1 and MLH3 stabilize the crossover events, ensuring at least one obligatory crossover per chromosome arm. This gives each chromosome a minimum of two crossover sites. Additional crossovers are also possible but regulated.

== DNA repair ==
During pachytene, any unresolved DNA double-strand breaks from previous recombination events are repaired. Mismatch repair proteins help correct any errors in base pairing between the homologs.

Treatment of male mice during meiosis with gamma radiation causes DNA damage. Homologous recombination is the principal mechanism of DNA repair acting during meiosis. From the leptotene to early pachytene stages of meiosis exogenous damage triggered the massive presence of gamma H2AX (which forms when DNA double-strand breaks appear), H2AX was present throughout the nucleus, and this was associated with DNA repair mediated by homologous recombination components DMC1 and RAD51 proteins.

== The meiotic sex checkpoint ==
Pachytene is also a stage where a critical checkpoint operates to monitor proper chromosome synapsis and recombination. Errors detected at this stage can arrest the meiotic cell cycle and trigger apoptosis (programmed cell death) of the defective cell.

== Transition to diplotene ==
Once crossover events are stabilized, the synaptonemal complex disassembles and chromosomes begin to gradually desynapse as the cell transitions into the diplotene stage.

== Importance ==
The pachytene stage is essential for the extensive genetic recombination and accurate chromosome segregation in meiosis. Defects at this stage can lead to aneuploidy and nondisjunction.
