= Gravitational biology =

Effect of gravity on living organisms

Gravitational biology is the study of the effects gravity has on living organisms. Throughout the history of the Earth, life has evolved to survive changing conditions, such as changes in the climate and habitat. However, one constant factor in evolution since life first began on Earth is the force of gravity. As a result, many biological processes have adapted to the constant force of gravity and even small variations in this force can have significant impact on the health and function of organisms. These processes include the gravity sensing ability of organisms known as graviperception and the ability of unicellular organisms and cells to move in relation to gravity known as gravitaxis. These processes also include more complex processes which exist at the multicellular level such as the directed growth of plants relative to gravity known as gravitropism. Additionally, changes to the force of gravity, like those in microgravity, have been known to cause adverse health effects like bone and muscle atrophy making the understanding of the effects that microgravity has on organisms an important focus in the field of gravitational biology.

== Gravity and life on Earth ==
Gravity has acted as a constant force influencing the development of organisms throughout the history of life on Earth. As a result, organisms, both plants and animals, have evolved various adaptations to it. Some organisms use gravity as a method of orientation and stability while others have evolved skeletal structures to overcome gravity-imposed size restrictions and to keep shape.

== Graviperception ==
Across evolution, organisms have developed specialized structures designed to sense the gravity vector. This type of perception is known as graviperception. These gravity sensing structures share similar designs among plants and animals often involving a dense mass or statolith falling under gravity and interacting with a mechanosensory structure that then sends a signal about the orientation of gravity.

== Gravity at the unicellular level ==
Protists, unicellular organisms that live predominantly in fluid environments, have evolved adaptations to the effects of gravity in order to remain in their preferred environment. As protists are heavier than water, they naturally sink in most of their environments. This poses the risk of sedimentation in fluid environments. To counteract this, protists developed organelles like cilia and flagella that facilitate active orientated movement. This oriented movement is facilitated by the gravity vector being constant in magnitude and direction allowing it to be a reliable point of orientation.

=== Unicellular movement under gravity ===
While single-celled organisms have the ability of independent movement, they also move depending on their relation to the gravity vector. This type of movement is called gravitaxis, which describes the response microorganisms have to Earth's gravitational field. Organisms showing positive or negative gravitaxis move differently relative to the gravity vector. Paramecium shows a negative gravitaxis and moves against the gravity vector as its main food source lives nearer to the surface. Loxodes show a positive gravitaxis moving further from the surface in search of low oxygen environments.

== Effects of gravity on plants ==
Plant tropisms are directional movements of a plant with respect to a directional stimulus. One such tropism is gravitropism, or the growth or movement of a plant with respect to gravity. In flowering plants, both roots and shoots exhibit gravitropism. Roots display positive gravitropism, growing in the direction of gravity, while shoots exhibit negative gravitropism, growing away from the direction of gravity and out of the soil. This directional growth is due to the statoliths in the plant's statocytes settling in response to gravity.

A graphic showing the direction roots and shoots grow due to gravitropism in conjunction with phototropism on different surfaces.

Root growth is regulated by plant hormones of which the hormone auxin plays a central role. When amyloplastic statoliths settle within the root cap statocytes, this sedimentation triggers a redistribution of auxin toward the lower side of the root. In roots, higher concentrations of auxin inhibit cell elongation on the lower side while allowing greater elongation on the upper side. This differential growth causes the root to curve downward, directing root growth in the direction of gravity.

In the shoot, gravitropism works to keep the plant positioned upwards. When in an inclined position the statoliths settle inside the statocyte in the direction of the gravity vector causing a redistribution of auxin. Similar to the roots, auxin accumulates on the lower side however in the shoot, it increases the cell expansion on the lower side causing the shoot to point upwards.

== Effects of gravity on animals ==
Animals, like plants, have evolved methods for perceiving and responding to gravity. These methods differ depending on the structure of the animal, as differences exist in the graviperception organs between invertebrates and vertebrates. In vertebrates that are bilaterally symmetrical, like humans, the graviperception organs are located in the vestibular system of the inner ear. These structures take the form of three perpendicular semicircular canals with pouches containing three otolith organs in lower vertebrates or two otolith organs and a lagena in higher vertebrates. Invertebrates have similar graviperception organ structure to plants involving a statolith's movement due to gravity causing a stimulus inside the statocyst.

=== Biological restrictions due to gravity ===
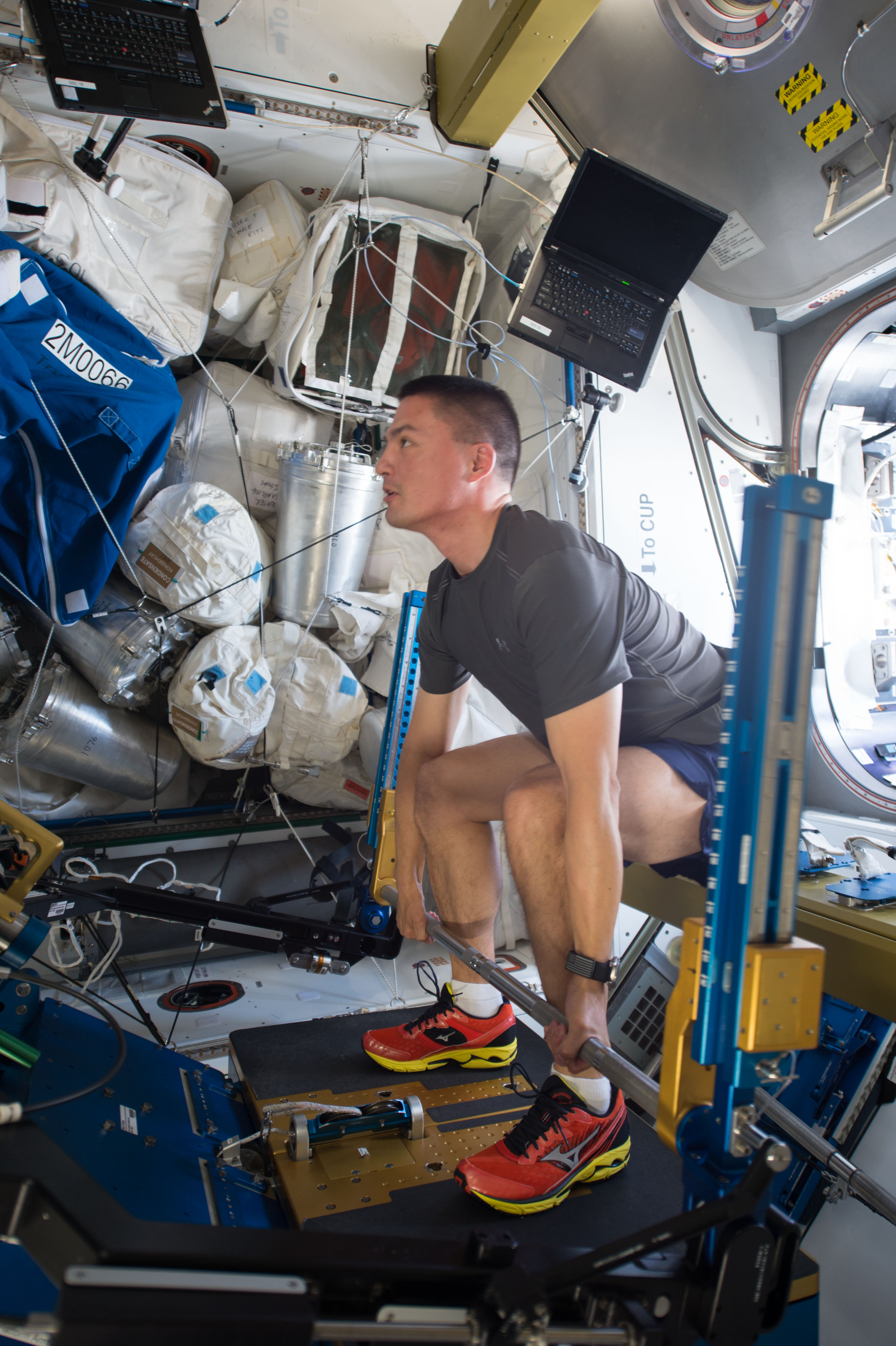
Crews aboard the ISS exercise on average two hours a day to minimize the effects of microgravity induced atrophy

Gravity has been a constant obstacle that organisms have had to live with and adapt to. Changes in the force of gravity have been associated with changes in the size of cells with higher gravitational forces decreasing the cell size and reduced gravitational forces increasing it. The effects of gravity on multicellular organisms are considerably more drastic. During the period when animals first evolved to survive on land, some method of directed locomotion and thus a form of inner skeleton or outer skeleton would have been required. This would help them adapt to the increases in the apparent force of gravity due to the weakened upward force of buoyancy. Prior to this point, most lifeforms were small and had a worm- or jellyfish-like appearance, and without this evolutionary step, would not have been able to maintain their form or move on land. These adaptations needed to be made for organisms to survive terrestrial gravity as the musculoskeletal and circulation systems along with fluid distributions would all be affected as approximately 60% of muscle mass is dedicated to opposing gravity.

=== Effects of microgravity ===
Reduced gravity environments, such as those found in space and on the surfaces of the Moon and Mars, are considered to be one of the fundamental challenges in interplanetary travel. The reduced load of gravity causes the cells that break down old and damaged bone to outpace the rate at which cells are able to produce new bone resulting in weaker and less dense bone mass. Muscles that would normally be used by moving around Earth would also weaken as less stress is put on them.

== See also ==
- Astrobiology
- Cell biology
- Space exploration
