= Decay-missing-filled index =

Measurement of dental health

The decay-missing-filled (DMF) index or decayed, missing, and filled teeth (DMFT) index is one of the most common methods in oral epidemiology for assessing dental caries prevalence as well as dental treatment needs among populations and has been used for about 75 years. This index is based on in-field clinical examination of individuals by using a probe, mirror and cotton rolls, and simply counts the number of decayed, missing (due to caries only) and restored teeth. Another version proposed in 1931 counts each affected surface, yielding a decayed, missing, and filled surfaces (DMFS) index. Statistics are available per populations according to age (e.g., "DMF of 12-year old children"). Because the DMF index is done without X-ray imaging, it underestimates real caries prevalence and treatment needs.

== See also ==
- Dentistry
- Epidemiology
