= Sentinel surveillance =

Voluntary network to monitor disease

Sentinel surveillance is monitoring of rate of occurrence of specific diseases and conditions through a voluntary network of doctors, laboratories and public health departments with a view to assess the stability or change in health levels of a population. It also describes the study of disease rates in a specific cohort such as a geographic area or subgroup to estimate trends in a larger population. In zoonotic diseases, sentinel surveillance may be in a host species.

== Purpose ==
A sentinel surveillance system is used to obtain data about a particular disease that cannot be obtained through a passive system such as summarizing standard public health reports. Data collected in a well-designed sentinel system can be used to signal trends, identify outbreaks and monitor disease burden, providing a rapid, economical alternative to other surveillance methods.

== Method ==
Sentinel systems involve a network of reporting sites, typically doctors, laboratories and public health departments. Surveillance sites must offer:

- commitment to resource the program
- a high probability of observing the target disease,
- a laboratory capable of systematically testing subjects for the disease,
- experienced, qualified staff.
- relatively large population with easy site access

== Passive surveillance ==
Passive surveillance systems receive data from "all" (or as many as possible) health workers/facilities and is the most common method of tracking communicable diseases. Passive surveillance does not require health authorities to stimulate reporting by reminding health care workers. Workers may receive the surveillance training in how to complete surveillance forms. Passive surveillance is often incomplete because of the limited reporting incentives.

== Systems ==
Sentinel systems collect data on Haemophilus influenzae type b, meningococcus and pneumococcus.

Because sentinel surveillance is conducted only at selected locations, it is not as appropriate for use on rare diseases or outbreaks distant from sentinel sites.

=== COVID-19 ===
The state of Hawaii conducts a sentinel surveillance program for COVID-19. From March 1 to April 11, 2020, Hawaii's system detected 23 cases of COVID-19 among 1,084 specimens tested (2.1%). Samples were selected to match the state's geographic and age distribution. In Santa Clara, California, researchers analyzed sentinel surveillance data from March 5 to 14, 2020. From this sample, 19 out of 226 participants (8%) had COVID-19.

== See also ==
- Epidemiology
