= Philadelphia Game Lab =

Non-profit organization

The Philadelphia Game Lab (PGL) was a non-profit organization (501c3) to facilitate the growth and visibility of small-team development of creative technologies in the Philadelphia region. PGL created game development tools, including a toolset for the creation of audio-only games and a platform for the creation of collaborative games. Both tools were developed under a permissive MIT License. As of 2022, PGL is no longer in operation.

== Location ==
PGL was formerly located on the 5th floor of 30 South 15th Street (the Graham Building). Prior to this it was located at the Benjamin's Desk building.

== Funding ==
PGL was backed by a D2PA Grant from the Commonwealth of Pennsylvania.

== History ==
Nathan Solomon founded PGL in late 2011. Philadelphia Game Lab compared itself to diverse initiatives, including Boston's MassDiGi, Toronto's Hand Eye Society, New York University's Game Center, and creative facilitators/organizations such as The Wild Rumpus, Babycastles, and Juegosrancheros. Solomon said of the Philadelphia business environment: "We should emphasize bootstrapped entities, and reject the model of massive scalability (required by the conventional tech venture capital model), as the primary requirement of a tech startup. I'm not saying that if someone has offered funding and takes it, that's a bad thing; however, this city should brand itself as so good for bootstrapping that it has a unique value that cannot be found in NYC or San Francisco or even Boston."

Regarding PGL's location in Philadelphia, Solomon said, "From a hard numbers perspective, Philadelphia probably has the lowest per-capita number of professional game developers for a city its size in North America. At the same time, though, Philadelphia is a great place for creative and technical initiatives, and I think there's a valid argument that we're uniquely strong in grassroots initiatives here, especially those for social or creative good."

== Grassroots Game Conference ==
The Grassroots Game Conference was an annual event hosted by PGL that targeted game developers, as well as those involved in arts, non-profits, and education. The conference was first held in coordination with Philly Tech Week 2012 from April 23 to April 28.

The Grassroots Game Conference was dedicated to facilitating small-team game development, with tracks in Games and Art, Games and Music, and Games and Gamification for Non-profits. The conference differed from user-focused events (such as Penny Arcade Expo and ComicCon), events focused on professional developers (such as the Game Developers Conference), and retail events (such as the Electronic Entertainment Expo). Events similar to the Grassroots Game Conference included Indiecade and the Games for Change Festival.

Nationally recognized game developers and educators spoke at the 2012 event, including representatives from the Smithsonian, the National Endowment for the Arts, and Glitch Labs. Gabe Zichermann, a gamification expert, gave the keynote speech.

The 2013 Grassroots Game Conference was significantly larger than 2012, including more events and additional interest tracks, as well as international presenters.
