= Active Student Response Techniques =

Active student response (ASR) techniques are strategies to elicit observable responses from students in a classroom. They are grounded in the field of behavioralism and operate by increasing opportunities reinforcement during class time, typically in the form of instructor praise. Active student response techniques are designed so that student behavior, such as responding aloud to a question, is quickly followed by reinforcement if correct. Common form of active student response techniques are choral responding, response cards, guided notes, and clickers. While they are commonly used for disabled populations, these strategies can be applied at many different levels of education. Implementing active student response techniques has been shown to increase learning, but may require extra supplies or preparation by the instructor.

== History ==
Active student response techniques are grounded in the field of behaviorism, a movement in psychology that believes behaviors are responses to stimuli and motivated by past reinforcement. The field has its origins in experiments of Edward Thorndike, who pioneered the Law of effect, which is now known as reinforcement and punishment. Thorndike explained that behaviors that produce a positive effect become more likely to reoccur, given the same scenario. Conversely, behaviors that produce a negative effect become less likely to reoccur.

Psychologist B.F. Skinner applied the principles of behaviorism to influence education. Skinner believed that students must be active in the classroom and that effective instruction is based on positive reinforcement. According to Skinner, teachers should avoid punishment, as it only teaches students to avoid punishment. Instead, lessons should be broken into small tasks with clear instruction and positive reinforcement. His beliefs led him to invent the teaching machine. Active student response techniques use Skinner's model to provide rapid reinforcement for desired responses. This increases the likelihood the responses will occur again. Also, these techniques may give instructors an opportunity to embrace technology in the classroom.

The foundation of active student response techniques is behaviorism's stimulus-response-reinforcement paradigm. A stimulus is any environmental change that may produce a response. In an academic setting, a stimulus is often a verbal cue. The response may be any change by the subject, such as an emotion or a behavior. Reinforcers are either positive or negative. In an academic setting, confirmation of a correct answer may be a positive reinforcer. So, active student response techniques aim to arrange the paradigm so the response is most correct. This includes separating instruction into small, achievable steps, providing clear and quick feedback, and including many repetitions. As a result, the correct response will have a strong relationship to the stimulus, creating more learning.

== Methods ==
=== Choral responding ===
Choral responding is a low-tech, high-ASR strategy that paces instruction throughout a class. In this strategy, students are prompted to respond orally in unison to questions posed by an instructor. For choral responding to work, questions must be presented clearly, be able to answered briefly, and have one correct answer. Choral responding is useful for reviewing subject matter, solving problems, or spelling words. It may be used to review previously covered content or provide feedback throughout a class period. Choral responding is effective in both small- and whole-group instruction, for students from preschool through secondary grades, in both general education and special education, as measured by learning outcomes.

The instructional format for choral responding is the following:

1. Instructor poses a question (e.g. "What is 9x9?")
2. Appropriate wait-time pause
3. Instructor uses a clear signal (e.g. "Tell me.")
4. Instructor provides feedback for the majority answer (e.g. Correct! 9x9 is 81.")

=== Response cards ===
Response cards are cards, signs, or other objects held up by students in unison in response to a question posed by an instructor. Write-on response cards, such as whiteboards, allow students to write their answers on the spot and erase between learning trials. Pre-printed response cards are pre-made and are often true/false or colors to indicate answers. Both types of response cards promote high-ASR by allowing all students to respond to all questions, instead of one student responding to each. Instructors can easily gauge learning using response cards.

The instructional format of response cards is similar to choral responding, as follows:

1. Instructor poses a question with a clear, quick response (e.g. "What is the atomic number of carbon?")
2. Appropriate wait-time pause for students to write answers
3. Instructor uses a clear signal (e.g. "Show me your boards!")
4. Instructor provides feedback (e.g. "That's right! The atomic number of carbon is 6.) Occasionally, the instructor may want to address some of the incorrect responses that were given.

Implementing response cards in a classroom may increase questions posed by the instructor, increase academic performance, and be favored by students. The technique is effective in both general education and special education. Response cards may also increase on-task behavior in the classroom and decrease disruptive behavior. Response cards are most effective when paired with brisk instructional pacing. Instructors have been easily able to implement response cards and achieve a response rate of approximately one response per minute. The brisk instructional pace maximized responses in a class period without sacrificing accuracy and while minimizing problem behavior.

=== Guided notes ===
Notetaking serves both a process and product function. But, traditional notetaking is dependent on attendance, criterion knowledge, and attention. Often, students may be inefficient note takers by recording incomplete, verbatim notes. Distributing instructor's notes increases academic performance. Guided notes aims to improve notetaking behavior by ensuring complete and accurate notes.

Guided notes are prepared handouts containing standard cues to guide a student through a lecture. The handouts are often based on the instructor's notes with blank spaces throughout for the student to fill in. In the blank spaces, the student is to complete the information or concept, creating a high-ASR strategy with many response opportunities throughout the lecture. The blank spaces should be varied and may allow for many different types of responses, such as drawing pictures or graphs. While mostly low-tech, guided notes has the option to use many high-tech applications, such as software that makes guided notes from completed notes. Guided notes are used in both K-12 level and college levels. The active student response technique improves assessment scores, accuracy of notes, and student responses during lecture. Most students prefer guided notes over traditional notetaking.

The instructional format of guided notes is as follows:

1. Instructor makes an outline of the lecture, and should contain clear typographical cues, such as bullet points
2. Instructor replaces some sections with blank spaces where the student will write in the information
3. Guided notes are distributed to students for the lecture

Example of guided notes:

The space between two neurons is the _________. Neurons most often exhibit _______ signaling within cells and _______ signaling between cells.                                                                                                                                             The generation of the _______ potential produces an ______-or-none response. So, greater intensity stimulation produces higher ________.

=== High-tech strategies ===
Response strategies can be implemented using commercially available technologies, such as clickers or mobile phone apps. Similar to response cards, the instructor would pose a question and ask for a response from the class. Some of the process may be automated with a software that uses a clear signal for response and collects student responses. Though, high-tech strategies are not as well researched.

== Applications ==
Active student response techniques can be applied to nearly all levels of education. Also, the techniques can be used with multiple populations. The Individuals with Disabilities Education Act (IDEA) prioritizes accessible general education that includes individuals with disabilities, including those with autism spectrum disorder, intellectual disabilities, learning disabilities, and behavior disorders. Active student response benefits the inclusion of students with disabilities in classrooms by facilitating all students' participation in the classroom.

Higher education may also benefit from active student response techniques.. Undergraduate classrooms would often benefit from implementing the techniques. While traditional lectures serve a function in higher education, such as setting context and synthesizing information, the reliance on passive learning is not as effective as active student learning.

Active student response strategies can be either low- or high-tech. High-tech strategies, which use electrical devices, may utilize mobile phones, clickers, or other devices. Low-tech strategies do not require any electrical devices and may not require anything more than pencil and paper. Examples include guided notes and response cards. The range of technology that can be used broadens the applications of active student response.

== Compared to traditional teaching styles ==
Traditional lecturing, in which an instructor speaks uninterrupted for the majority of the class, is often less effective than active student response techniques. Without active participation from students and contingent positive reinforcement for correct responses, traditional lecturing does not reinforce desired behaviors. Traditional lecturing may allow disorganized delivery of information. Implementing active student response techniques into lectures ensures the lectures function to assess, instruct, plan, and evaluate.

Active student response techniques have been shown to increase learning, compared to traditional lecture. During lectures with active student response, students exhibited more on-task behavior, and instructors received more feedback. Frequency of active student responses is correlated with performance on evaluations. Instructors also remarked that active student participation provides instructors with clear feedback and promotes a more inclusive nature of the classroom.

However, active student response also demands a higher cost. Instructors must supply or prepare any necessary materials. For example, to implement guided notes, instructors must write and print the notes to distribute to students. Similarly, the techniques demand more time from instructors. It may take added preparation to plan all of the questions throughout class. If an instructor chooses to use response cards, the instructor must prepare questions to which the class can respond.
