= Lumsdaine =

Lumsdaine is a surname. Notable people with the surname include:

- Arthur A. Lumsdaine (1913–1989), American applied psychologist
- David Lumsdaine (1931–2024), Australian composer
- Leon Lumsdaine (1923–1966), British modern pentathlete
- Jack Lumsdaine (1895–1948), Australian singer and songwriter
