= Kris Duggan =

Australian-born entrepreneur

- Born: Sydney, Australia
- Education: University of California, Irvine
- Occupations: Investor, entrepreneur
- Years active: 1999-present
- Known for: BetterWorks and Badgeville
- Website: krisduggan.com

Kris Duggan is an Australian-born entrepreneur, advisor, investor, who co-founded and was the founding CEO of Badgeville and BetterWorks.

== Life and education ==
Kris Duggan was born in Sydney, Australia, and grew up in Houston, Texas, and later Southern California. He graduated with an MBA in Information Technology from University of California, Irvine. He moved to Silicon Valley in 1999 and now lives in Palo Alto with his wife and two sons.

== Career ==
From 2003 to 2006, Duggan held senior sales management positions with WebEx prior to its acquisition by Cisco for $3.2 billion. The company, now known as Cisco WebEx, provides virtual, on-demand collaboration software including web conferencing and videoconferencing.

Between 2009 and 2013, Duggan was an advisor to Palantir Technologies, contributing to the company's go-to-market strategy and its expansion into the federal government.

Kris Duggan co-founded Badgeville in 2010. Badgeville designs game-based programs for companies to encourage social interaction and track analytics. Badgeville for Salesforce, its CRM gamification application, was launched in September 2012. During his three-year tenure as CEO, the company raised $40 million in capital, including $25 million in a third round of funding from InterWest Partners.

In 2013, Duggan co-founded BetterWorks, a Silicon Valley–based company offering a cloud-based continuous performance management platform for enterprise companies. BetterWorks integrates with existing management software to track goals and progress. BetterWorks is funded by Kleiner Perkins (board member John Doerr) and Emergence Capital (board member Jason Green) and has raised $40 million in capital. During Duggan's leadership, BetterWorks raised $15.5 million from a group of investors in 2014 and another $20 million in Series B funding in 2016.

In 2015, Duggan developed the BetterWorks performance tracker smartphone app for the Apple Watch. Duggan and the company made national news in 2015 for switching from typical annual reviews and pay raises to other incentives. Duggan resigned as CEO of BetterWorks in July 2017 following allegations of sexual misconduct and battery by an ex-employee. As of February 2018, Duggan was an active board member.

Prior to Badgeville and BetterWorks, Duggan co-founded Medsphere, a government open-source medical platform, and OzNetwork, an Internet media company.

Kris Duggan is an advisory chair to the Alchemist Accelerator, an organization that facilitates enterprise startups and advises new entrepreneurs. He was also an adjunct faculty member for Singularity University.

On July 11, 2017, Beatrice Kim, a former employee of BetterWorks, filed a civil lawsuit in San Francisco Superior Court against the company, Duggan, and two other employees accusing them of sexual harassment and discrimination. Kim's accusations against Duggan included battery and assault. Duggan denied the allegations. He resigned as CEO of BetterWorks on July 26, 2017. The lawsuit was settled for around $1 million. The claims of sexual misconduct and the controversy surrounding these allegations led to the delayed publication of a book co-written by Duggan, which was eventually published without his name.

== Publications ==
- Duggan, Kris; Shoup, Kate (23 January 2013). Business Gamification For Dummies. John Wiley & Sons. ISBN 978-1-118-46694-0.
