= Health Score =

Mobile health features

Health Score is a scoring system used by several mobile health companies in various ways to track an individual's health via Quantified Self and the help of mobile applications, social networking and elements of gamification. According to them when tracked over time, it offers a good directional indicator of how the users health and well-being is evolving over time. The scoring engine varies considerably from one company to another, and in some cases, the scoring engine is trademarked and/or patented, such as in the case of dacadoo. Health is invisible and therefore, all health scores in use have one thing in common: they want to capture and measure health and wellness and make it visible.

== Overview ==
Health is invisible and intangible. The basic premise of a health scoring concept is that what you can measure, you can manage. If you can measure health and wellness good enough as an indicator, then you can start working with it. None of the available health scores is in medical diagnosis, they're all lifestyle-products where the health score in use is to be understood as an indicator, a number that helps you to work with it. The score typically moves up or down indicating improvement, when it moves up, and vice versa. The simpler health scores available are more static in nature and provide a number based on some inputs provided. The more sophisticated health scores are dynamic and function in real-time, moving (such as exercise, nutrition, stress and sleep) change. Most health scores claim they are based on scientific data. The simpler models use one or a few models, the more sophisticated health scores claim to include a vast amount of models and person-years of clinical data.

Some health scores use in addition to static questionnaires also dynamic and ongoing data, such as captured and tracked by fitness or activity trackers or applications for smartphones, For instance, exercise can be tracked automatically by using a mobile app for smartphones to track the activity, or by using fitness tracking apps or devices from the supplier of the health score solution, or by connecting popular fitness tracking apps such as RunKeeper and activity tracking devices such as Fitbit or UP Jawbone step counters, etc. In the past, available information was limited and lifestyle adjustments were largely made only once a health problem was detected, and then under the guidance of healthcare professionals. Today due partly to the availability of electronic mass media there is a trend among the population to maintain their health on their own terms. This seems to be precipitating a shift away from the reactive model of health to a more proactive approach where the individual works towards the maintenance of their wellness before problems arise. This shift in attitudes is said to have broad implications for both public health and individual companies. Improved health would logically lead to reduced healthcare costs and increase workplace productivity.

A wide array of technologies are now available that allow data to be collected on various components of wellness many of them using a variant of the Health Scoring system. Devices for measuring physical attributes, such as blood pressure, blood glucose, and total cholesterol are also commonly used by patients with chronic diseases such as diabetes or hypertension. Furthermore, devices that can be used by healthy individuals to monitor exercise and energy expenditure are increasingly popular, and range from simple heart rate monitors or step counters to more elaborate computerized exercise machines. These tools provide data on the user’s performance and many can upload the data to further systems to be processed. Undoubtedly, the largest growth area has been in apps, facilitated by the widespread use of tablets and smartphones. Although some of these apps may be gimmicks, many are said to be validated genuine tools to assist in improving health and wellness.

Some of the Health Score using companies such as Fitocracy have grown to over one million users or more by focusing progress based on what's known as gamification as well as by celebrity exposure with the likes of Arnold Schwarzenegger promoting their products.

== Criticism ==
The large majority of offerings with health scores is in the lifestyle segment and not in medical diagnosis, therefore prospective clinical trials to scientifically prove whether a score is accurate or not, are often missing.

A single integer measuring wellness and health outcomes is subject to many unknown variables and incomplete data.

== Products using Health Score ==
- Consumable Science's MyBodyScore
- Cooey Health Score -Health Diary App
- Customer Health Scoring
- dacadoo Health Score
- Digital Health Score Card - app, Johnson & Johnson
- HealthyEnviron (uses CDC/EPA data to assign a health score based on how the environment affects human health)
- Higi Score
- Humantiv Health Score- App, Citizen Health
- Life Time Fitness myHealthScore
- NikeFuel Score
- Nudge score - App
- One Healthscore
- Remedy Social Health Score
- TicTrac Wellness Score
- USAF Health Score
- Unity Health Score
- Vivametrica Health Score
