= Kent Mathematics Project =

Mathematics education system

Front cover of K.M.P. Test Book level 1.

The Kent Mathematics Project (K.M.P.) was an educational system for teaching mathematics to 9-16 year olds. The system comprised task worksheets, booklets, audio compact cassettes and tests. Through the 1970s and 1980s, it was widely adopted in Kent schools, as well as being exported internationally.

The system was based on the idea that:

mathematical learning should be in terms of levels of concept development and that chronological age should not be the basis of course design.

K.M.P. providing materials and structure for non-specialist teachers to teach math classes while sharing the effort required in producing suitable teaching material.

== History ==
Started in 1966, the project originated at Ridgewaye School, Southborough, Tunbridge Wells which closed its doors in 1991. K.M.P went through several titles including "An Auto-Instructional Course in Mathematics" and "The Ridgewaye Individualized Course". The system was inspired by the self-directed learning of the Dalton Plan while attempting to avoid its pitfalls. K.M.P was gradually extended over time, involving trials at a number of schools before being more widely distributed. K.M.P. was adopted by the education authority in 1970 and used in over seventy schools around Kent.

In 1988, the project's director objected to the National Curriculum which emphasised goals to be achieved by particular ages.

== Usage ==
To teach a specific concept, the teacher selected a set of twelve tasks called a "matrix" from a material bank for the pupil to complete. The teacher was expected to be available to mentor pupils if they encountered difficulty. The tasks were completed in any order, then self-corrected by the pupil and checked by the teacher. When the entire task matrix is completed, the pupil performed a test to check their understanding. The tests results were then used by the teacher to construct the next task matrix. This allowed children to progress at their own rate, either ahead or behind the rest of the class, while allowing the teacher to customize the course to the pupil's needs. Tasks were assigned a level of 1 to 9, depending on their difficulty. The difficulty of tasks assigned was based on the child's ability, rather than their age.

KMP materials were published by Ward Lock & Co.

== Impact ==
Ideas from K.M.P. were adopted in later teaching tools, including Graded Assessment in Mathematics (GAIM) and Secondary Mathematics Individualised Learning Experiment (SMILE).

== See also ==
- Programmed learning
- Mastery learning
- Educational technology
