= Kenneth Stroud =

Kenneth Stroud may refer to:

- Ken Stroud, author of mathematics textbooks
- Kenny Stroud, English footballer
