= List of MeSH codes (V02) =

The following is a partial list of the "V" codes for Medical Subject Headings (MeSH), as defined by the United States National Library of Medicine (NLM).

This list continues the information at List of MeSH codes (V01). Codes following these are found at List of MeSH codes (V03). For other MeSH codes, see List of MeSH codes.

The source for this content is the set of 2006 MeSH Trees from the NLM.

== MeSH V02 – publication formats (publication type) ==
=== MeSH V02.070 – addresses (publication type) ===
- MeSH V02.070.500 – lectures (publication type)
- MeSH V02.070.750 – sermons (publication type)

=== MeSH V02.165 – bibliography (publication type) ===
- MeSH V02.165.500 – biobibliography (publication type)

=== MeSH V02.170 – biography (publication type) ===
- MeSH V02.170.500 – interview (publication type)
- MeSH V02.170.750 – personal narratives (publication type)

=== MeSH V02.240 – catalogs (publication type) ===
- MeSH V02.240.500 – price lists (publication type)

=== MeSH V02.260 – collected works (publication type) ===
- MeSH V02.260.260 – collected correspondence (publication type)
- MeSH V02.260.400 – festschrift (publication type)

=== MeSH V02.270 – congresses (publication type) ===
- MeSH V02.270.500 – overall (publication type)

=== MeSH V02.310 – dictionary (publication type) ===
- MeSH V02.310.500 – phrases (publication type)
- MeSH V02.310.750 – terminology (publication type)

=== MeSH V02.355 – ephemera (publication type) ===
- MeSH V02.355.249 – advertisements (publication type)
- MeSH V02.355.374 – letter (publication type)
- MeSH V02.355.500 – posters (publication type)
- MeSH V02.355.750 – programs (publication type)
- MeSH V02.355.775 – prospectuses (publication type)

=== MeSH V02.375 – eulogies (publication type) ===
- MeSH V02.375.400 – funeral sermons (publication type)

=== MeSH V02.515 – guideline (publication type) ===
- MeSH V02.515.500 – practice guideline (publication type)

=== MeSH V02.530 – historical article (publication type) ===
- MeSH V02.530.150 – biography (publication type)
- MeSH V02.530.250 – classical article (publication type)
- MeSH V02.530.400 – festschrift (publication type)

=== MeSH V02.540 – humor (publication type) ===
- MeSH V02.540.200 – cartoons (publication type)

=== MeSH V02.575 – instruction (publication type) ===
- MeSH V02.575.249 – examination questions (publication type)
- MeSH V02.575.500 – lecture notes (publication type)
- MeSH V02.575.600 – nurses' instruction (publication type)
- MeSH V02.575.700 – problems and exercises (publication type)
- MeSH V02.575.720 – programmed instruction (publication type)

=== MeSH V02.600 – journal article (publication type) ===
- MeSH V02.600.500 – review (publication type)

=== MeSH V02.660 – monograph (publication type) ===
- MeSH V02.660.500 – textbooks (publication type)

=== MeSH V02.672 – overall (publication type) ===
- MeSH V02.672.500 – festschrift (publication type)

=== MeSH V02.695 – pharmacopoeias (publication type) ===
- MeSH V02.695.500 – herbals (publication type)

=== MeSH V02.700 – pictorial works (publication type) ===
- MeSH V02.700.300 – drawings (publication type)
- MeSH V02.700.450 – maps (publication type)
- MeSH V02.700.600 – portraits (publication type)

=== MeSH V02.725 – popular works (publication type) ===
- MeSH V02.725.500 – juvenile literature (publication type)
- MeSH V02.725.750 – patient education handout (publication type)

=== MeSH V02.912 – review (publication type) ===
- MeSH V02.912.500 – consensus development conference (publication type)
- MeSH V02.912.500.500 – consensus development conference, NIH (publication type)

=== MeSH V02.998 – unpublished works (publication type) ===
The list continues at List of MeSH codes (V03).
