= Sidney L. Pressey =

American psychologist (1888–1979)

Sidney Leavitt Pressey (Brooklyn, New York, December 28, 1888 – July 21, 1979) was professor of psychology at Ohio State University for many years. He is famous for having invented a teaching machine many years before the idea became popular.

"The first.. [teaching machine] was developed by Sidney L. Pressey... While originally developed as a self-scoring machine... [it] demonstrated its ability to actually teach".

Pressey joined Ohio State in 1921, and stayed there until he retired in 1959. He continued publishing after retirement, with 18 papers between 1959 and 1967. He was a cognitive psychologist who "rejected a view of learning as an accumulation of responses governed by environmental stimuli in favor of one governed by meaning, intention, and purpose". In fact, he had been a cognitive psychologist his entire life, well before the "mythical birthday of the cognitive revolution in psychology". He helped create the American Association of Applied Psychology and later helped merge this group with the APA, after World War Two. In 1964 he was given the first E. L. Thorndike Award. The next year he became a charter member for National Academy of Education. After his retirement he created a scholarship program for honor students at Ohio State. In 1976, Ohio State named a learning resource building Sidney L. Pressey Hall.

== The 'teaching machine' ==
Pressey's idea started as a machine for administering multiple-choice questions (MCQs) to students. MCQs were (and are still) a basic method for testing students in the United States. Pressey's machine had a window with a question and four answers. The student pressed the key to the chosen answer. The machine recorded the answer on a counter to the back of the machine, and showed the next question.

The great idea was to fix the machine so that it would not move on until the student chose the right answer. Then it was easy to show that this second arrangement taught the students which were the right answers. This was the first demonstration that a machine could teach, and also a demonstration that knowledge of results was the cause of the learning. This kind of feedback to the learner is basic: it just tells the learner whether they are right or not. Later work on other kinds of learning material showed that even better results were got when the feedback contained more explanatory material.

Pressey continued to improve his devices after World War II, and the papers of Pressey and his colleagues are reprinted in a leading sourcebook.

A number of reviews credit Pressey with being the originator of teaching machines, and of important aspects of programmed learning. This was long before the better known efforts of B.F. Skinner. The review by Klaus gave a special appreciation of Pressey and his work. Skinner, who was responsible for bringing the whole subject into popular view, acknowledged Pressey's work in his 1958 paper on teaching machines.

Sidney was displeased by the “crass commercialization” of teaching machines. He objected to this use of teaching machines feeling they had a lack of questioning about basic theory. He also felt that their full potential was not being fully utilized. He felt that programmed texts were “no more learning than simple silent reading”.

Pressey's own term was "adjunct autoinstruction". He thought it important to follow learning by questions "to enhance the clarity and stability of cognitive structure by correcting misapprehensions, and deferring the instruction of new matter until there had been such clarification and elucidation". The topic itself might be programmed, or it might not.

== Introduction to the Use of Standard Tests ==
One of Pressey's most underrated contributions was the creation of Introduction to the Use of Standard Tests: A Brief Manual in the Use of Tests of Both Ability and Achievement in the School Subjects. Pressey created this in 1922. The purpose of this book was to address the need for a manual covering tests of ability and achievement, clarifying of the fundamental facts regarding tests, the handling of tests results, and the significance of test results. Pressey felt the need for this manual as he witnessed tests being used more and more in everyday life. Tests were not only being used more by teachers; they were also being used more by those not especially trained in their use. The manual was to act as an introductory handbook for tests.

== Pressey's major textbook ==
Pressey's major textbook Psychology and the new education, 1937 and 1944, is a prototypical cognitive text for student teachers. He writes (p369) of a diagnostic attack on teaching problems:

"For example, analysis of error, and remedial work based on the analysis, was found to improve greatly the mastery of algebra. In another experiment, individualization and diagnosis caused great improvement, as shown by actual performance, in the mastery of vocational agriculture".

Pressey goes on to quote more published examples, and gives the data from some of these studies. The whole of chapter 10, The nature and control of the learning process, is directly relevant to the ideas of programmed learning which developed after World War II in the United States.

Pressey's whole approach to educational psychology ran in opposition to the influence of B.F. Skinner and the behaviorists, as this quotation illustrates:

"The archvillain, leading so many people astray, is declared to be learning theory! No less a charge is made than that the whole trend of American research and theory as regards learning has been based on a false premise—that the important features of human learning are to be found in animals. Instead, the all-important fact is that humans have transcended animal learning. Language, number, such skills as silent reading, make possible facilitations of learning, and kinds of learning, impossible even for the apes, Autoinstruction should enhance such potentials. Instead, current animal derived procedures in autoinstruction destroy meaningful structure to present material serially in programs, and replace processes of cognitive clarification and largely rote reinforcements of bit learnings".

== Books by Pressey ==
- Pressey S.L. & Pressey L.C. 1923. Introduction to the use of standard tests. Harrap.
- Pressey S.L. & Pressey L.C. 1927. Mental abnormality and deficiency. Macmillan.
- Pressey S.L. 1933. Psychology and the new education. Harper.
  - Pressey S.L. & Robinson F.P. 1944. Psychology and the new education. Revised edition, Harper.
- Pressey S.L. & Janney J.E. 1937. Casebook of research in education. Harper.
- Pressey S.L; Janney J.E. & Kuhlen R.G. 1939. Life: a psychological survey. Harper.
- Pressey S.L. & Kuhlen R.G. 1957. Psychological development through the life span. Harper & Row.
- Pressey S.L; Robinson F.P & Horrocks J.E. 1959. Psychology in education. Harper.

=== Autobiographies ===
- Pressey, Sidney L. 1967. Autobiography. In A history of psychology in autobiography, vol 5. eds Edward G. Boring and Gardner Lindzey. New York: Appleton-Century-Croft.
- Pressey, Sidney L. 1971. Sidney Leavitt Pressey, Part I: An autobiography. In Leaders in American education, ed. Robert J. Havighurst. Chicago: University of Chicago Press.
