= List of MeSH codes (V03) =

The following is a partial list of the "V" codes for Medical Subject Headings (MeSH), as defined by the United States National Library of Medicine (NLM).

This list continues the information at List of MeSH codes (V02). Codes following these are found at List of MeSH codes (V04). For other MeSH codes, see List of MeSH codes.

The source for this content is the set of 2006 MeSH Trees from the NLM.

== MeSH V03 – study characteristics (publication type) ==
=== MeSH V03.200 – clinical trial (publication type) ===
- MeSH V03.200.100 – clinical trial, phase I (publication type)
- MeSH V03.200.200 – clinical trial, phase II (publication type)
- MeSH V03.200.300 – clinical trial, phase III (publication type)
- MeSH V03.200.400 – clinical trial, phase IV (publication type)
- MeSH V03.200.500 – controlled clinical trial (publication type)
- MeSH V03.200.600 – multicenter study (publication type)
- MeSH V03.200.700 – randomized controlled trial (publication type)

=== MeSH V03.300 – consensus development conference (publication type) ===
- MeSH V03.300.300 – consensus development conference, NIH (publication type)

=== MeSH V03.950 – validation studies (publication type) ===
The list continues at List of MeSH codes (V04).
