= Waldo Earle Sweet =

American classicist and reformer in Latin education 1912-1992

Waldo Earle Sweet (April 26, 1912 – September 15, 1992) was an American classicist and educator associated with the mid-20th-century reform of Latin-language teaching in the United States. He taught at the University of Michigan from 1953 until his retirement in 1982 and held the title Professor of Latin and the Teaching of Latin. Sweet applied structural linguistics, programmed instruction, and instructional technology to Latin pedagogy.

Sweet' major instructional works included Latin: A Structural Approach (1957) and the programmed course Artes Latinae. His work became associated with the expression "Sweet Latin", and his approach contributed to the later pedagogical tradition known as "Michigan Latin".

== Early life and education ==
Sweet was born on April 26, 1912, in Hartford, Connecticut. He received his A.B. from Amherst College in 1934 and an M.A. from Columbia University in 1935. He subsequently studied at Princeton University, receiving an A.M. and Ph.D. in 1943. His dissertation was titled Demetrius Poliorcetes: A Study in Literary Sources.

Before joining the University of Michigan, Sweet taught at several secondary schools in the eastern United States, including Eaglebrook School, Millbrook School, Phillips Academy Andover, and William Penn Charter School.

== Military service ==
During World War II, Sweet served in the United States Army. A wartime service record published by Phillips Academy states that he entered the Army as a private in February 1943 and was assigned to the 86th Regiment, U.S. Mountain Troops, at Camp Hale, Colorado. He subsequently served as an instructor with the 10th Reconnaissance Troop at Camp Hale.

According to the Phillips Academy record, Sweet served overseas with the 436th Field Artillery Group in England, France, and Germany from October 1944 through August 1945. From September through December 1945 he performed special service with military occupation troops. He was promoted to private first class in August 1943, corporal in January 1944, sergeant in June 1944, and staff sergeant in April 1945. He was released from service in January 1946.

A Princeton University alumni memorial also notes Sweet's wartime involvement in training U.S. mountain troops.

== University of Michigan ==
Sweet joined the University of Michigan in 1953 as an Associate Professor of Latin and the Teaching of Latin. He later became Professor of Latin and the Teaching of Latin and remained at Michigan until his retirement in 1982.

According to fellow University of Michigan teacher and classicist Ludwig Koenen's biographical account in the Rutgers University Database of Classical Scholars, Sweet was the only person at Michigan to hold the title Professor of the Teaching of Latin, a distinction Koenen attributes to Sweet's leadership in Latin pedagogy.

Sweet's work at Michigan coincided with an active program in linguistics. He had become interested in applying structural linguistics to Latin teaching and was particularly influenced by linguist Charles C. Fries. With support from the Carnegie Corporation, Latin Workshops were held at the University of Michigan in the summers of 1952 and 1953. Participants collected and analyzed linguistic data and developed new materials for Latin instruction.

== Reform of Latin teaching ==
Sweet became associated with the reform movement in Latin teaching that developed during the 1950s. Koenen attributes Sweet's association with the movement to his work in applying linguistic analysis to the description and teaching of Latin.

Sweet's approach grew out of structural linguistics, which emphasized systematic descriptions of the phonological, morphological, and syntactic structures of languages and the contrasts between the language being learned and the learner's native language. Deborah Pennell Ross, in a University of Michigan history of the approach, traces the development of what became known as "Michigan Latin" to Sweet and his colleagues Gerda M. Seligson and Glenn M. Knudsvig.

The experimental work of the Michigan Latin Workshops produced Latin Workshop Experimental Materials. Sweet continued developing the approach, resulting in Latin: A Structural Approach, published by the University of Michigan Press in 1957.

Sweet later described the progression of his work from the experimental materials through Latin: A Structural Approach and ultimately to Artes Latinae.

Sweet's experimental materials were used outside Michigan during the development of the structural approach. A 1958 account in the Jesuit Educational Quarterly reported that the Experimental Materials developed through the Latin workshops had been used in a number of schools around the United States.

One participant in the Sweet's 1952 workshop, Latin teacher Fritz Kempner, described the workshop as crucial to the development of his own teaching. In his retrospective memoir Looking Back, Kempner recalled that working with Sweet and participating in the development of the experimental materials changed his understanding of how Latin could be taught. He would later referred to his early work as that of Sweet's "disciple". After Sweet left William Penn Charter School for the University of Michigan in 1953, Sweet recommended Kempner as his replacement at Penn Charter.

His methods also attracted the attention of other Latin teachers. In a 1961 account, classicist Frederick E. Brenk described traveling to the University of Michigan in 1960 specifically to study the structural approach being developed by Sweet.

== Latin: A Structural Approach ==
Sweet's Latin: A Structural Approach was published by the University of Michigan Press in 1957. The book presented beginning Latin using principles derived from structural linguistics and pattern practice and grew out of the experimental teaching materials developed in connection with the Michigan Latin Workshops.

A distinctive feature of Sweet's treatment of Latin morphology was his reorganization of the traditional noun paradigm. Sweet had addressed this method as early as 1950 in an article titled "The Horizontal Approach" in The Classical Weekly, indicating that the horizontal organization of Latin morphology preceded his later textbooks and formed part of the early development of his pedagogical method. Ross later described "Sweet Latin" as using a horizontal paradigm that presented the forms of a single grammatical case across the declensions, rather than the traditional practice of introducing all the case forms of one declension together.

Traditional and "Sweet Latin" case order
Traditional approach	"Sweet Latin" approach
1. Nominative; 2. Genitive; 3. Dative; 4. Accusative; 5. Ablative	1. Nominative; 2. Accusative; 3. Ablative; 4. Dative; 5. Genitive

Sweet's reorganization was unconventional and did not initially win broad acceptance. Ross reports that a 1950 presentation of his structural approach was received by the audience with skepticism; decades later, she described teachers using the Michigan method in both pure and modified forms.

The horizontal paradigm was part of a broader reorganization of Latin grammar based on structural-linguistic analysis. According to Ross, Sweet replaced older notional grammatical categories with categories based upon the observed formal distribution of Latin forms. Other distinctive features included pattern-practice exercises adapted from modern-language instruction and the use of both authentic and constructed Latin from the beginning of instruction.

This approach, therefore, represented more than a different arrangement of declension tables. Sweet attempted to organize the presentation of Latin morphology and syntax around observable structural relationships within the language and contrasts between Latin and English.

The textbook received attention in the professional literature, including a review in The Classical Outlook in 1959.

A revised edition appeared in 1966 with Ruth S. Craig and Gerda M. Seligson as coauthors. Ross states that the book continued to be used at Michigan until 1981, when it was replaced by an early version of Latin for Reading.

== Artes Latinae and programmed instruction ==
Sweet subsequently developed Artes Latinae, a programmed Latin course that extended his experimentation with Latin pedagogy and incorporated programmed-learning techniques.

The original print curriculum was organized into two levels. A 1978 Georgia Department of Education textbook list records four books by Sweet: Level I, Book One (1966); Level I, Book Two (1967); Level II, Book One (1968); and Level II, Book Two (1969). The state textbook list described the materials as a programmed reader intended for individualized instruction.

Earlier state education records also document the distribution of Sweet's instructional materials. Georgia's 1974 state textbook list included all four Artes Latinae books for grades 8–12 and described the series as a "programmed reader for individualized instruction". A 1965 Georgia catalog of classroom teaching tapes also listed Sweet's The Sounds of Latin, a series of pattern-practice recordings produced by Sweet and supplied courtesy of the University of Michigan.

Artes Latinae used programmed instruction in which material was divided into a sequence of small instructional units or frames, with students responding repeatedly and receiving feedback. The method allowed students to proceed substantially at their own pace. Later electronic versions retained this programmed, self-paced structure.

The course was field-tested during its development. An account published in the Bryn Mawr Classical Review states that Sweet personally taught developmental versions at junior-high and college levels and that versions of the program were tested in thirteen junior-high classes. The published version was subsequently tested by thirteen pilot teachers at eleven institutions around the United States.

Artes Latinae received sustained attention in professional classical journals. Marian F. McNamara and Robert Bell reviewed the course in The Classical World in 1968; the same journal published "Artes Latinae: An Appraisal after Four Years" in 1970, and Thomas G. McCarty reviewed the course in The Classical Outlook in 1974.

Sweet also produced graded readers and related instructional materials, including Lectiones Primae: A Graded Reader (1968) and Lectiones Secundae: A Graded Reader (1970).

== Computer-assisted instruction ==
Sweet continued experimenting with instructional technology during his career at Michigan. Koenen credits him with developing an entire Latin curriculum based on programmed instructional materials and with pioneering work in computer-based Latin instruction.

His work in programmed learning and computer-assisted instruction formed part of a broader effort to apply contemporary linguistic theory, educational psychology, and instructional technology to classical-language education.

Later versions of Artes Latinae appeared in electronic form. A 1998 CD-ROM edition retained the self-paced programmed structure of Sweet's original materials. A 1999 review in the Bryn Mawr Classical Review described the electronic course as based closely on the original Artes Latinae content, organized into instructional "frames" with frequent student responses and immediate feedback. The CD-ROM also included recordings of Latin passages in Sweet's pronunciation alongside other pronunciation options.

== Influence and legacy ==
Sweet's methods became sufficiently distinctive that the expression "Sweet Latin" became associated with his approach. Koenen identifies Sweet with the Latin-teaching reform movement that began in the mid-1950s and characterizes his work in computer-based Latin instruction as pioneering.

Sweet's approach was also recognized in broader professional discussions of classical-language instruction. A discussion in PMLA identified experimentation with applied linguistics in Latin teaching as proceeding along lines set forth in Sweet's Latin: A Structural Approach.

Contemporary educational literature also identified Sweet as a leading figure in the structural reform of Latin teaching and discussed his horizontal treatment of noun declensions, in which students encountered the same grammatical case across the declensions rather than learning every case of one declension before proceeding to the next. Another contemporary report on language teaching characterized Sweet's Latin materials as pioneering developments in foreign-language instructional materials.

An editorial introduction accompanying Sweet's discussion of the continued development of the structural approach described his work in applying linguistics and programmed learning to Latin instruction as pioneering.

Ross traces the subsequent Michigan Latin tradition to Sweet and his colleagues. Although the approach continued to develop after Sweet's original work, later Michigan Latin retained his underlying principle of using linguistic analysis to inform Latin instruction and of teaching students to read Latin as Latin rather than treating the language primarily as an exercise in translation.

Elements of the Michigan approach subsequently appeared beyond the University of Michigan. Ross reports that concepts developed in the tradition entered articles and instructional materials elsewhere and that teachers from elementary-school through university level were using the Michigan method in either pure or modified form.

Koenen likewise states that many of Sweet's ideas and models were subsequently adopted in schools and colleges around the United States and identifies "Sweet Latin" as part of the history of Latin teaching in America.

Sweet's programmed-learning materials also continued beyond their original print editions. A 1999 review in the Bryn Mawr Classical Review discussed the CD-ROM adaptation of Artes Latinae and noted the continued use of the printed course among homeschoolers and independent learners.

Sweet's influence was therefore expressed both through specific instructional works such as Latin: A Structural Approach and Artes Latinae and through the broader pedagogical tradition that developed from his application of linguistic analysis to Latin teaching.

Sweet's structuralist approach also continued to serve as a point of comparison in later scholarship on computer-assisted Latin instruction. A study of software design for learning Latin contrasted a later cognitive approach with "behavioristic structuralism as applied to Latin language learning by, for instance, Waldo Sweet", illustrating the continuing recognition of his method in discussions of Latin-language pedagogy.

His Princeton memorial states that he wrote or edited thirteen books and more than forty articles on Latin teaching and classical studies and notes that innovations he proposed in the early 1950s continued to gain acceptance decades later.

== Other interests ==
Sweet was active in running, skiing, and outdoor recreation. He coached track and skiing, competed in running events into later life, and helped organize the first Sierra Club chapter in Michigan.

He also wrote about athletics and recreation in antiquity, including Sport and Recreation in Ancient Greece: A Sourcebook with Translations (1987).

Sweet died on September 15, 1992, in Ann Arbor, Michigan.

== Selected works ==
The following works are among those listed in the Database of Classical Scholars bibliography for Sweet:

- Latin Workshop Experimental Materials, Book One (1953)
- Latin Workshop Experimental Materials, Book Two (1954; revised 1956)
- Latin: A Structural Approach (1957; revised edition with Ruth S. Craig and Gerda M. Seligson, 1966)
- Vergil: A Structural Approach (1960)
- Clozes and Vocabulary Exercises for Books I and II of the Aeneid (1961)
- Artes Latinae, Level I (beginning 1966)
- Artes Latinae, Level II (beginning 1968)
- Lectiones Primae: A Graded Reader (1968)
- Lectiones Secundae: A Graded Reader (1970)
- A Course on Words, with Glenn Knudsvig (1982; revised 1989)
- Vergil's Aeneid: Books I and II (1983)
- Sport and Recreation in Ancient Greece: A Sourcebook with Translations (1987)
