= Dacadoo =

Swiss technology company

dacadoo ag
- Company type: Private company
- Website type: Health promotion, mhealth, Social Networking, digital health engagement, health risk quantification
- Available in: Over 18 languages including: American English, UK English, German, Dutch, European Portuguese, Brazilian Portuguese French, Canadian French Russian, Japanese, Korean, Spanish, Italian, Polish, Danish, Central Thai, Traditional Chinese and Chinese simplified
- Founded: Zurich, Switzerland
- Area served: Worldwide
- Owner: Peter Ohnemus
- Website: www.dacadoo.com
- Registration: Required
- Launched: December 2011
- Current status: Active

dacadoo is a Zurich-based technology company that combines mobile technologies, social networking, gamification, Artificial Intelligence (AI) and big data analytics with the aim of helping users improve their health and wellbeing.

== History and background ==
dacadoo is based in Zurich, Switzerland and was founded as QUENTIQ AG in 2010 by Peter Ohnemus, a serial Swiss entrepreneur. It was later renamed to dacadoo ag in January 2012. Ohnemus worked since the early days of dacadoo together with Prof. Laurence Jacobs and Andre Naef on the core research and development of the dacadoo Health Score.

dacadoo has client service offices in Boston (USA), Odense (Denmark), Sydney (Australia), Shanghai (China) and Tokyo (Japan). The company is privately funded.

dacadoo's first product, the Digital Health Engagement platform, went live in December 2011. Since then, they have released several updates and major improvements and currently runs on version 4.4.0, titled Wheel of Life™, in over 18 languages across the world.

The company focuses exclusively on a B2B2C go-to-market approach and has signed agreements with customers (insurers, corporate wellness vendors, etc.) who launched the dacadoo platform in an own branded version to their end users in various countries.

The company presupposes its health platform execution on the premise that sedentary lifestyles have increased the proportion of people who are overweight, have diabetes or suffer heart failure in our society thus pressuring further the already stressed healthcare budgets of most developed countries. One such study is the clinical data published in the Edward R. Laskowski, M.D., Mayo Clinic, 2018 publication: «An analysis of 13 studies of sitting time and activity levels found that those who sat for more than eight hours a day with no physical activity had a risk of dying similar to the risks of dying posed by obesity and smoking.» With these types of studies as their reference dacadoo has been, according to their website and press releases, developing the Wheel of Life™ lifestyle navigation platform that calculates a person's Health Score.

The score, a number from 0 to 1,000, is calculated based on over 300 million person-years of clinical data and represents a person's health status from poor to excellent. It aims to represent a directional relative indicator of a user's current health and wellbeing status in real-time. The dacadoo Health Score is based on three main pillars:

- Your Physical Health (who you are): the platform captures hard data such as age, sex, weight, height, body dimensions, blood values and blood pressure
- Your Mental Wellbeing (how you feel): the platform uses a quality of life questionnaire to obtain the necessary information for this pillar
- Your Lifestyle (what you do): the platform captures data from physical activity, nutrition, sleep, self-control and mindfulness

According to their statement, many of the company's initiatives aim to focus on active health promotion (prevention) and healthier lifestyle to tackle the problems before they become chronic – in this instance referencing a report on global life sciences published by Greg Reh in 2020 which recognizes that changing behavioral patterns represented the single biggest opportunity to improve an individual's health outcome.

The company's business model is based on the premise that the combination of smartphone technology, social networking, motivation techniques from the gaming industry (gamification), Artificial Intelligence (AI), big data analytics and a reward system, have the power to facilitate lifestyle behavior change in individuals. As a result, the company trademarked the dacadoo Health Score Platform based on these principles. The company has since launch issued a disclaimer that the so-called dacadoo Health Score is not a medical diagnostic tool but a lifestyle product and therefore does not substitute the diagnosis of a medical professional.
