= List of MeSH codes (Z01) =

The following is a list of "Z" codes for Medical Subject Headings (MeSH), as defined by the United States National Library of Medicine (NLM).

This list continues the information at List of MeSH codes (V04). For other MeSH codes, see List of MeSH codes.

The source for this content is the set of 2006 MeSH Trees from the NLM.

== MeSH Z01 – Geographic Locations ==
=== MeSH Z01.058 – Africa ===
- MeSH Z01.058.266 – Africa, Northern
- MeSH Z01.058.266.104 – Algeria
- MeSH Z01.058.266.317 – Egypt
- MeSH Z01.058.266.513 – Libya
- MeSH Z01.058.266.629 – Morocco
- MeSH Z01.058.266.887 – Tunisia
- MeSH Z01.058.290 – Africa South of the Sahara
- MeSH Z01.058.290.100 – Africa, Central
- MeSH Z01.058.290.100.110 – Cameroon
- MeSH Z01.058.290.100.120 – Central African Republic
- MeSH Z01.058.290.100.130 – Chad
- MeSH Z01.058.290.100.140 – Congo
- MeSH Z01.058.290.100.220 – Democratic Republic of the Congo
- MeSH Z01.058.290.100.300 – Equatorial Guinea
- MeSH Z01.058.290.100.380 – Gabon
- MeSH Z01.058.290.120 – Africa, Eastern
- MeSH Z01.058.290.120.180 – Burundi
- MeSH Z01.058.290.120.275 – Djibouti
- MeSH Z01.058.290.120.292 – Eritrea
- MeSH Z01.058.290.120.310 – Ethiopia
- MeSH Z01.058.290.120.400 – Kenya
- MeSH Z01.058.290.120.680 – Rwanda
- MeSH Z01.058.290.120.730 – Somalia
- MeSH Z01.058.290.120.760 – Sudan
- MeSH Z01.058.290.120.840 – Tanzania
- MeSH Z01.058.290.120.880 – Uganda
- MeSH Z01.058.290.175 – Africa, Southern
- MeSH Z01.058.290.175.095 – Angola
- MeSH Z01.058.290.175.230 – Botswana
- MeSH Z01.058.290.175.400 – Lesotho
- MeSH Z01.058.290.175.500 – Malawi
- MeSH Z01.058.290.175.545 – Mozambique
- MeSH Z01.058.290.175.580 – Namibia
- MeSH Z01.058.290.175.735 – South Africa
- MeSH Z01.058.290.175.795 – Swaziland
- MeSH Z01.058.290.175.920 – Zambia
- MeSH Z01.058.290.175.960 – Zimbabwe
- MeSH Z01.058.290.190 – Africa, Western
- MeSH Z01.058.290.190.200 – Benin
- MeSH Z01.058.290.190.245 – Burkina Faso
- MeSH Z01.058.290.190.272 – Côte d'Ivoire
- MeSH Z01.058.290.190.300 – Gambia
- MeSH Z01.058.290.190.320 – Ghana
- MeSH Z01.058.290.190.375 – Guinea
- MeSH Z01.058.290.190.380 – Guinea-Bissau
- MeSH Z01.058.290.190.425 – Liberia
- MeSH Z01.058.290.190.500 – Mail
- MeSH Z01.058.290.190.520 – Mauritania
- MeSH Z01.058.290.190.560 – Niger
- MeSH Z01.058.290.190.565 – Nigeria
- MeSH Z01.058.290.190.710 – Senegal
- MeSH Z01.058.290.190.725 – Sierra Leone
- MeSH Z01.058.290.190.800 – Togo

=== MeSH Z01.107 – Americas ===
- MeSH Z01.107.084 – Caribbean region
- MeSH Z01.107.084.900 – West Indies
- MeSH Z01.107.084.900.050 – Antigua
- MeSH Z01.107.084.900.100 – Bahamas
- MeSH Z01.107.084.900.140 – Barbados
- MeSH Z01.107.084.900.225 – Cuba
- MeSH Z01.107.084.900.262 – Dominica
- MeSH Z01.107.084.900.300 – Dominican Republic
- MeSH Z01.107.084.900.362 – Grenada
- MeSH Z01.107.084.900.393 – Guadeloupe
- MeSH Z01.107.084.900.425 – Haiti
- MeSH Z01.107.084.900.525 – Jamaica
- MeSH Z01.107.084.900.600 – Martinique
- MeSH Z01.107.084.900.645 – Netherlands Antilles
- MeSH Z01.107.084.900.750 – Puerto Rico
- MeSH Z01.107.084.900.787 – Saint Kitts and Nevis
- MeSH Z01.107.084.900.825 – Saint Lucia
- MeSH Z01.107.084.900.862 – Saint Vincent and the Grenadines
- MeSH Z01.107.084.900.900 – Trinidad and Tobago
- MeSH Z01.107.084.900.970 – Virgin Islands of the United States
- MeSH Z01.107.169 – Central America
- MeSH Z01.107.169.133 – Belize
- MeSH Z01.107.169.238 – Costa Rica
- MeSH Z01.107.169.339 – El Salvador
- MeSH Z01.107.169.454 – Guatemala
- MeSH Z01.107.169.534 – Honduras
- MeSH Z01.107.169.690 – Nicaragua
- MeSH Z01.107.169.772 – Panama
- MeSH Z01.107.169.772.584 – Panama Canal Zone
- MeSH Z01.107.424 – Latin America
- MeSH Z01.107.567 – North America
- MeSH Z01.107.567.176 – Canada
- MeSH Z01.107.567.176.064 – Alberta
- MeSH Z01.107.567.176.160 – British Columbia
- MeSH Z01.107.567.176.410 – Manitoba
- MeSH Z01.107.567.176.494 – New Brunswick
- MeSH Z01.107.567.176.540 – Newfoundland
- MeSH Z01.107.567.176.564 – Northwest Territories
- MeSH Z01.107.567.176.589 – Nova Scotia
- MeSH Z01.107.567.176.614 – Nunavut
- MeSH Z01.107.567.176.639 – Ontario
- MeSH Z01.107.567.176.732 – Prince Edward Island
- MeSH Z01.107.567.176.791 – Quebec
- MeSH Z01.107.567.176.858 – Saskatchewan
- MeSH Z01.107.567.176.929 – Yukon Territory
- MeSH Z01.107.567.403 – Greenland
- MeSH Z01.107.567.589 – Mexico
- MeSH Z01.107.567.875 – United States
- MeSH Z01.107.567.875.075 – Appalachian region
- MeSH Z01.107.567.875.075.100 – Alabama
- MeSH Z01.107.567.875.075.250 – Georgia
- MeSH Z01.107.567.875.075.400 – Kentucky
- MeSH Z01.107.567.875.075.418 – Maryland
- MeSH Z01.107.567.875.075.437 – New York
- MeSH Z01.107.567.875.075.475 – North Carolina
- MeSH Z01.107.567.875.075.512 – Ohio
- MeSH Z01.107.567.875.075.550 – Pennsylvania
- MeSH Z01.107.567.875.075.662 – South Carolina
- MeSH Z01.107.567.875.075.775 – Tennessee
- MeSH Z01.107.567.875.075.837 – Virginia
- MeSH Z01.107.567.875.075.900 – West Virginia
- MeSH Z01.107.567.875.350 – Great Lakes region
- MeSH Z01.107.567.875.350.350 – Illinois
- MeSH Z01.107.567.875.350.350.200 – Chicago
- MeSH Z01.107.567.875.350.360 – Indiana
- MeSH Z01.107.567.875.350.500 – Michigan
- MeSH Z01.107.567.875.350.510 – Minnesota
- MeSH Z01.107.567.875.350.530 – New York
- MeSH Z01.107.567.875.350.530.530 – New York City
- MeSH Z01.107.567.875.350.540 – Ohio
- MeSH Z01.107.567.875.350.550 – Pennsylvania
- MeSH Z01.107.567.875.350.900 – Wisconsin
- MeSH Z01.107.567.875.500 – Mid-Atlantic region
- MeSH Z01.107.567.875.500.200 – Delaware
- MeSH Z01.107.567.875.500.210 – District of Columbia
- MeSH Z01.107.567.875.500.500 – Maryland
- MeSH Z01.107.567.875.500.500.100 – Baltimore
- MeSH Z01.107.567.875.500.525 – New Jersey
- MeSH Z01.107.567.875.500.530 – New York
- MeSH Z01.107.567.875.500.530.530 – New York City
- MeSH Z01.107.567.875.500.550 – Pennsylvania
- MeSH Z01.107.567.875.500.550.525 – Philadelphia
- MeSH Z01.107.567.875.510 – Midwestern United States
- MeSH Z01.107.567.875.510.350 – Illinois
- MeSH Z01.107.567.875.510.350.200 – Chicago
- MeSH Z01.107.567.875.510.360 – Indiana
- MeSH Z01.107.567.875.510.370 – Iowa
- MeSH Z01.107.567.875.510.390 – Kansas
- MeSH Z01.107.567.875.510.400 – Kentucky
- MeSH Z01.107.567.875.510.500 – Michigan
- MeSH Z01.107.567.875.510.510 – Minnesota
- MeSH Z01.107.567.875.510.515 – Missouri
- MeSH Z01.107.567.875.510.520 – Nebraska
- MeSH Z01.107.567.875.510.525 – North Dakota
- MeSH Z01.107.567.875.510.540 – Ohio
- MeSH Z01.107.567.875.510.550 – Oklahoma
- MeSH Z01.107.567.875.510.700 – South Dakota
- MeSH Z01.107.567.875.510.900 – Wisconsin
- MeSH Z01.107.567.875.550 – New England
- MeSH Z01.107.567.875.550.200 – Connecticut
- MeSH Z01.107.567.875.550.500 – Maine
- MeSH Z01.107.567.875.550.510 – Massachusetts
- MeSH Z01.107.567.875.550.510.210 – Boston
- MeSH Z01.107.567.875.550.580 – New Hampshire
- MeSH Z01.107.567.875.550.680 – Rhode Island
- MeSH Z01.107.567.875.550.880 – Vermont
- MeSH Z01.107.567.875.560 – Northwestern United States
- MeSH Z01.107.567.875.560.380 – Idaho
- MeSH Z01.107.567.875.560.500 – Montana
- MeSH Z01.107.567.875.560.550 – Oregon
- MeSH Z01.107.567.875.560.900 – Washington
- MeSH Z01.107.567.875.560.925 – Wyoming
- MeSH Z01.107.567.875.580 – Pacific states
- MeSH Z01.107.567.875.580.100 – Alaska
- MeSH Z01.107.567.875.580.200 – California
- MeSH Z01.107.567.875.580.200.450 – Los Angeles
- MeSH Z01.107.567.875.580.200.700 – San Francisco
- MeSH Z01.107.567.875.580.375 – Hawaii
- MeSH Z01.107.567.875.580.550 – Oregon
- MeSH Z01.107.567.875.580.900 – Washington
- MeSH Z01.107.567.875.750 – Southeastern United States
- MeSH Z01.107.567.875.750.100 – Alabama
- MeSH Z01.107.567.875.750.110 – Arkansas
- MeSH Z01.107.567.875.750.350 – Florida
- MeSH Z01.107.567.875.750.370 – Georgia
- MeSH Z01.107.567.875.750.480 – Louisiana
- MeSH Z01.107.567.875.750.500 – Mississippi
- MeSH Z01.107.567.875.750.530 – North Carolina
- MeSH Z01.107.567.875.750.700 – South Carolina
- MeSH Z01.107.567.875.750.870 – Virginia
- MeSH Z01.107.567.875.750.900 – West Virginia
- MeSH Z01.107.567.875.760 – Southwestern United States
- MeSH Z01.107.567.875.760.100 – Arizona
- MeSH Z01.107.567.875.760.200 – California
- MeSH Z01.107.567.875.760.200.450 – Los Angeles
- MeSH Z01.107.567.875.760.200.700 – San Francisco
- MeSH Z01.107.567.875.760.210 – Colorado
- MeSH Z01.107.567.875.760.550 – Nevada
- MeSH Z01.107.567.875.760.560 – New Mexico
- MeSH Z01.107.567.875.760.750 – Texas
- MeSH Z01.107.567.875.760.800 – Utah
- MeSH Z01.107.757 – South America
- MeSH Z01.107.757.077 – Argentina
- MeSH Z01.107.757.136 – Bolivia
- MeSH Z01.107.757.176 – Brazil
- MeSH Z01.107.757.235 – Chile
- MeSH Z01.107.757.284 – Colombia
- MeSH Z01.107.757.362 – Ecuador
- MeSH Z01.107.757.435 – French Guiana
- MeSH Z01.107.757.488 – Guyana
- MeSH Z01.107.757.656 – Paraguay
- MeSH Z01.107.757.702 – Peru
- MeSH Z01.107.757.833 – Suriname
- MeSH Z01.107.757.904 – Uruguay
- MeSH Z01.107.757.943 – Venezuela

=== MeSH Z01.252 – Asia ===
- MeSH Z01.252.100 – Asia, Central
- MeSH Z01.252.100.420 – Kazakhstan
- MeSH Z01.252.100.450 – Kyrgyzstan
- MeSH Z01.252.100.900 – Tajikistan
- MeSH Z01.252.100.940 – Turkmenistan
- MeSH Z01.252.100.975 – Uzbekistan
- MeSH Z01.252.145 – Asia, Southeastern
- MeSH Z01.252.145.103 – Borneo
- MeSH Z01.252.145.130 – Brunei
- MeSH Z01.252.145.182 – Cambodia
- MeSH Z01.252.145.281 – East Timor
- MeSH Z01.252.145.380 – Indonesia
- MeSH Z01.252.145.435 – Laos
- MeSH Z01.252.145.487 – Malaysia
- MeSH Z01.252.145.530 – Mekong Valley
- MeSH Z01.252.145.570 – Myanmar
- MeSH Z01.252.145.671 – Philippines
- MeSH Z01.252.145.774 – Singapore
- MeSH Z01.252.145.841 – Thailand
- MeSH Z01.252.145.945 – Vietnam
- MeSH Z01.252.245 – Asia, Western
- MeSH Z01.252.245.131 – Bangladesh
- MeSH Z01.252.245.162 – Bhutan
- MeSH Z01.252.245.393 – India
- MeSH Z01.252.245.393.750 – Sikkim
- MeSH Z01.252.245.500 – Middle East
- MeSH Z01.252.245.500.125 – Afghanistan
- MeSH Z01.252.245.500.175 – Bahrain
- MeSH Z01.252.245.500.350 – Iran
- MeSH Z01.252.245.500.360 – Iraq
- MeSH Z01.252.245.500.375 – Israel
- MeSH Z01.252.245.500.400 – Jordan
- MeSH Z01.252.245.500.425 – Kuwait
- MeSH Z01.252.245.500.450 – Lebanon
- MeSH Z01.252.245.500.600 – Oman
- MeSH Z01.252.245.500.690 – Qatar
- MeSH Z01.252.245.500.750 – Saudi Arabia
- MeSH Z01.252.245.500.795 – Syria
- MeSH Z01.252.245.500.850 – Turkey
- MeSH Z01.252.245.500.900 – United Arab Emirates
- MeSH Z01.252.245.500.950 – Yemen
- MeSH Z01.252.245.674 – Nepal
- MeSH Z01.252.245.723 – Pakistan
- MeSH Z01.252.245.840 – Sri Lanka
- MeSH Z01.252.474 – Far East
- MeSH Z01.252.474.164 – China
- MeSH Z01.252.474.164.450 – Hong Kong
- MeSH Z01.252.474.164.900 – Tibet
- MeSH Z01.252.474.463 – Japan
- MeSH Z01.252.474.463.709 – Tokyo
- MeSH Z01.252.474.538 – Korea
- MeSH Z01.252.474.580 – Macao
- MeSH Z01.252.474.651 – Mongolia
- MeSH Z01.252.474.872 – Taiwan

=== MeSH Z01.295 – Atlantic islands ===
- MeSH Z01.295.218 – Azores
- MeSH Z01.295.390 – Bermuda
- MeSH Z01.295.695 – Falkland Islands

=== MeSH Z01.338 – Australia ===
- MeSH Z01.338.240 – Australian Capital Territory
- MeSH Z01.338.480 – New South Wales
- MeSH Z01.338.500 – Northern Territory
- MeSH Z01.338.520 – Queensland
- MeSH Z01.338.600 – South Australia
- MeSH Z01.338.680 – Tasmania
- MeSH Z01.338.740 – Victoria
- MeSH Z01.338.800 – Western Australia

=== MeSH Z01.433 – Cities ===
- MeSH Z01.433.100 – Baltimore
- MeSH Z01.433.128 – Berlin
- MeSH Z01.433.210 – Boston
- MeSH Z01.433.305 – Chicago
- MeSH Z01.433.429 – District of Columbia
- MeSH Z01.433.553 – London
- MeSH Z01.433.565 – Los Angeles
- MeSH Z01.433.653 – Moscow
- MeSH Z01.433.741 – New York City
- MeSH Z01.433.800 – Paris
- MeSH Z01.433.820 – Philadelphia
- MeSH Z01.433.850 – Rome
- MeSH Z01.433.875 – San Francisco
- MeSH Z01.433.900 – Tokyo

=== MeSH Z01.542 – Europe ===
- MeSH Z01.542.049 – Andorra
- MeSH Z01.542.088 – Austria
- MeSH Z01.542.115 – Belgium
- MeSH Z01.542.248 – Europe, Eastern
- MeSH Z01.542.248.020 – Albania
- MeSH Z01.542.248.136 – Baltic states
- MeSH Z01.542.248.136.360 – Estonia
- MeSH Z01.542.248.136.560 – Latvia
- MeSH Z01.542.248.136.580 – Lithuania
- MeSH Z01.542.248.160 – Bosnia-Herzegovina
- MeSH Z01.542.248.180 – Bulgaria
- MeSH Z01.542.248.190 – Byelarus
- MeSH Z01.542.248.295 – Croatia
- MeSH Z01.542.248.395 – Czech Republic
- MeSH Z01.542.248.495 – Hungary
- MeSH Z01.542.248.517 – Macedonia (republic)
- MeSH Z01.542.248.540 – Moldova
- MeSH Z01.542.248.679 – Poland
- MeSH Z01.542.248.764 – Romania
- MeSH Z01.542.248.775 – Russia
- MeSH Z01.542.248.775.150 – Bashkiria
- MeSH Z01.542.248.775.310 – Dagestan
- MeSH Z01.542.248.775.510 – Moscow
- MeSH Z01.542.248.775.800 – Siberia
- MeSH Z01.542.248.797 – Slovakia
- MeSH Z01.542.248.820 – Slovenia
- MeSH Z01.542.248.960 – Ukraine
- MeSH Z01.542.248.980 – Yugoslavia
- MeSH Z01.542.267 – Finland
- MeSH Z01.542.286 – France
- MeSH Z01.542.286.588 – Paris
- MeSH Z01.542.315 – Germany
- MeSH Z01.542.315.182 – Berlin
- MeSH Z01.542.315.315 – Germany, East
- MeSH Z01.542.315.440 – Germany, West
- MeSH Z01.542.335 – Gibraltar
- MeSH Z01.542.363 – Great Britain
- MeSH Z01.542.363.161 – Channel Islands
- MeSH Z01.542.363.161.500 – Guernsey
- MeSH Z01.542.363.300 – England
- MeSH Z01.542.363.300.553 – London
- MeSH Z01.542.363.423 – Hebrides
- MeSH Z01.542.363.602 – Northern Ireland
- MeSH Z01.542.363.766 – Scotland
- MeSH Z01.542.363.914 – Wales
- MeSH Z01.542.383 – Greece
- MeSH Z01.542.433 – Iceland
- MeSH Z01.542.467 – Ireland
- MeSH Z01.542.489 – Italy
- MeSH Z01.542.489.569 – Rome
- MeSH Z01.542.489.751 – Sicily
- MeSH Z01.542.524 – Liechtenstein
- MeSH Z01.542.550 – Luxembourg
- MeSH Z01.542.580 – Mediterranean region
- MeSH Z01.542.580.500 – Mediterranean islands
- MeSH Z01.542.580.500.300 – Cyprus
- MeSH Z01.542.580.500.650 – Malta
- MeSH Z01.542.580.500.751 – Sicily
- MeSH Z01.542.616 – Monaco
- MeSH Z01.542.651 – Netherlands
- MeSH Z01.542.727 – Portugal
- MeSH Z01.542.786 – San Marino
- MeSH Z01.542.808 – Scandinavia
- MeSH Z01.542.808.224 – Denmark
- MeSH Z01.542.808.618 – Norway
- MeSH Z01.542.808.618.650 – Svalbard
- MeSH Z01.542.808.843 – Sweden
- MeSH Z01.542.846 – Spain
- MeSH Z01.542.883 – Switzerland
- MeSH Z01.542.900 – Transcaucasia
- MeSH Z01.542.900.099 – Armenia
- MeSH Z01.542.900.120 – Azerbaijan
- MeSH Z01.542.900.420 – Georgia
- MeSH Z01.542.961 – Vatican City

=== MeSH Z01.586 – Historical Geographic Locations ===
- MeSH Z01.586.035 – Ancient Lands
- MeSH Z01.586.035.100 – Arabia
- MeSH Z01.586.035.150 – Armenia
- MeSH Z01.586.035.175 – Byzantium
- MeSH Z01.586.035.200 – Egypt
- MeSH Z01.586.035.450 – Greece
- MeSH Z01.586.035.725 – Persia
- MeSH Z01.586.200 – Commonwealth of Independent States
- MeSH Z01.586.200.099 – Armenia
- MeSH Z01.586.200.120 – Azerbaijan
- MeSH Z01.586.200.190 – Byelarus
- MeSH Z01.586.200.420 – Georgia
- MeSH Z01.586.200.440 – Kazakhstan
- MeSH Z01.586.200.450 – Kyrgyzstan
- MeSH Z01.586.200.540 – Moldova
- MeSH Z01.586.200.775 – Russia
- MeSH Z01.586.200.775.150 – Bashkiria
- MeSH Z01.586.200.775.310 – Dagestan
- MeSH Z01.586.200.775.510 – Moscow
- MeSH Z01.586.200.775.800 – Siberia
- MeSH Z01.586.200.900 – Tajikistan
- MeSH Z01.586.200.940 – Turkmenistan
- MeSH Z01.586.200.960 – Ukraine
- MeSH Z01.586.200.975 – Uzbekistan
- MeSH Z01.586.250 – Czechoslovakia
- MeSH Z01.586.250.395 – Czech Republic
- MeSH Z01.586.250.750 – Slovakia
- MeSH Z01.586.300 – European Union
- MeSH Z01.586.315 – Germany
- MeSH Z01.586.315.315 – Germany, East
- MeSH Z01.586.315.440 – Germany, West
- MeSH Z01.586.500 – Middle East
- MeSH Z01.586.500.125 – Afghanistan
- MeSH Z01.586.500.175 – Bahrain
- MeSH Z01.586.500.300 – Egypt
- MeSH Z01.586.500.350 – Iran
- MeSH Z01.586.500.360 – Iraq
- MeSH Z01.586.500.375 – Israel
- MeSH Z01.586.500.400 – Jordan
- MeSH Z01.586.500.425 – Kuwait
- MeSH Z01.586.500.450 – Lebanon
- MeSH Z01.586.500.460 – Libya
- MeSH Z01.586.500.600 – Oman
- MeSH Z01.586.500.690 – Qatar
- MeSH Z01.586.500.750 – Saudi Arabia
- MeSH Z01.586.500.795 – Syria
- MeSH Z01.586.500.850 – Turkey
- MeSH Z01.586.500.900 – United Arab Emirates
- MeSH Z01.586.500.950 – Yemen
- MeSH Z01.586.650 – New Guinea
- MeSH Z01.586.800 – Russia (pre-1917)
- MeSH Z01.586.950 – USSR
- MeSH Z01.586.950.099 – Armenia
- MeSH Z01.586.950.120 – Azerbaijan
- MeSH Z01.586.950.140 – Baltic states
- MeSH Z01.586.950.140.360 – Estonia
- MeSH Z01.586.950.140.560 – Latvia
- MeSH Z01.586.950.140.580 – Lithuania
- MeSH Z01.586.950.190 – Byelarus
- MeSH Z01.586.950.420 – Georgia
- MeSH Z01.586.950.440 – Kazakhstan
- MeSH Z01.586.950.450 – Kyrgyzstan
- MeSH Z01.586.950.540 – Moldova
- MeSH Z01.586.950.775 – Russia
- MeSH Z01.586.950.775.150 – Bashkiria
- MeSH Z01.586.950.775.310 – Dagestan
- MeSH Z01.586.950.775.510 – Moscow
- MeSH Z01.586.950.775.800 – Siberia
- MeSH Z01.586.950.900 – Tajikistan
- MeSH Z01.586.950.940 – Turkmenistan
- MeSH Z01.586.950.960 – Ukraine
- MeSH Z01.586.950.975 – Uzbekistan
- MeSH Z01.586.980 – Yugoslavia
- MeSH Z01.586.980.160 – Bosnia-Herzegovina
- MeSH Z01.586.980.295 – Croatia
- MeSH Z01.586.980.557 – Macedonia (Republic)
- MeSH Z01.586.980.820 – Slovenia

=== MeSH Z01.600 – Indian Ocean Islands ===
- MeSH Z01.600.200 – Comoros
- MeSH Z01.600.500 – Madagascar
- MeSH Z01.600.520 – Mauritius
- MeSH Z01.600.700 – Réunion
- MeSH Z01.600.750 – Seychelles

=== MeSH Z01.678 – Oceania ===
- MeSH Z01.678.100 – Australasia
- MeSH Z01.678.100.373 – Australia
- MeSH Z01.678.100.747 – New Zealand
- MeSH Z01.678.100.873 – Pacific Islands

=== MeSH Z01.756 – Oceans and Seas ===
- MeSH Z01.756.092 – Atlantic Ocean
- MeSH Z01.756.092.650 – North Sea
- MeSH Z01.756.342 – Indian Ocean
- MeSH Z01.756.592 – Mediterranean Sea
- MeSH Z01.756.700 – Pacific Ocean

=== MeSH Z01.782 – Pacific Islands ===
- MeSH Z01.782.590 – Melanesia
- MeSH Z01.782.590.373 – Fiji
- MeSH Z01.782.590.620 – New Caledonia
- MeSH Z01.782.590.715 – Papua New Guinea
- MeSH Z01.782.590.736 – Vanuatu
- MeSH Z01.782.680 – Micronesia
- MeSH Z01.782.680.435 – Guam
- MeSH Z01.782.680.717 – Palau
- MeSH Z01.782.747 – New Zealand
- MeSH Z01.782.815 – Polynesia
- MeSH Z01.782.815.482 – Hawaii
- MeSH Z01.782.815.700 – Pitcairn Island
- MeSH Z01.782.815.800 – Samoa
- MeSH Z01.782.815.800.100 – American Samoa
- MeSH Z01.782.815.800.400 – Independent State of Samoa
- MeSH Z01.782.815.890 – Tonga
