= Egoboo =

Pleasure received from public recognition of voluntary work

Egoboo /ˈiːɡoʊbuː/ is a colloquial expression for the pleasure received from public recognition of voluntary work.

The term was in use in science fiction fandom as early as 1947, when it was used (spelled "ego boo") in a letter from Rick Sneary published in the letter column of Thrilling Wonder Stories. It was originally simply used to describe the "ego boost" someone feels on seeing their name in print. As a reliable way for someone to get their name in print was to do something worth mentioning, it became caught up with the idea of voluntary community participation. As a result of this, in later years, the term grew to mean something akin to an ephemeral currency, e.g., "I got a lot of egoboo for editing that newsletter."

The term later spread into the open source programming movement, where the concept of non-monetary reward from community response is a key motivator for many of the participants.

As a result of its prevalence in this context, it is often attributed to Eric S. Raymond. However, it has been in use in science fiction fandom since 1947 or earlier, being referenced in the 1959 collection of fandom-related jargon Fancyclopedia II. It did not, however, occur in the 1944 predecessor to that work, Fancyclopedia I, suggesting the term came into common use sometime in the intervening years. The first print citation available electronically is in a 1950 issue of Lee Hoffman's Quandry, where it is spelled "ego-boo"; later usage dropped the hyphen and blended the two words, a common feature of fannish jargon.

The earliest online citation recorded is a reference to it being used in 1982, describing InConJunction, a science fiction convention in Indiana; the high proportion of science fiction fans on Usenet, and the Internet generally, in early years helped spread it into the wider computing community.

== See also ==
- Amateur professionalism
- Datafication
- Gamification
- Gratification
