= Sebastian Deterding =

Prof Sebastian Deterding
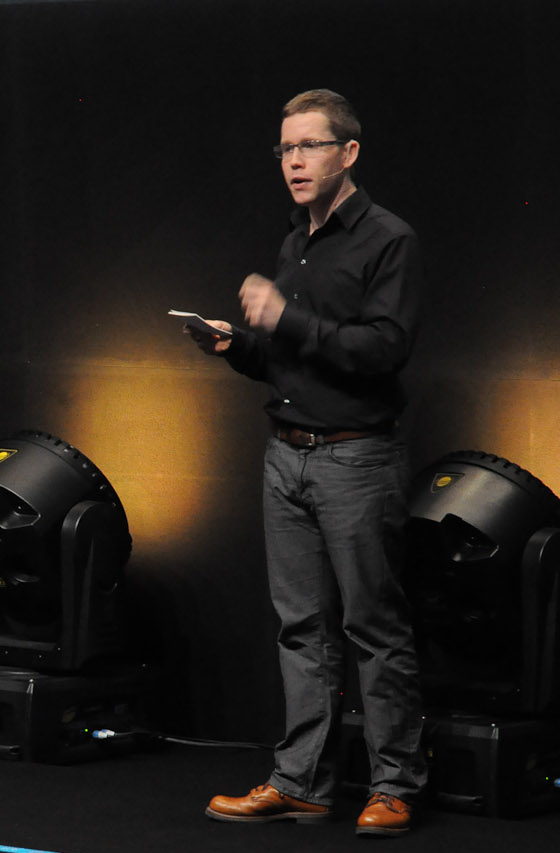
- Known for: Professor of Design Engineering at Imperial College (London), TED talk: What your designs say about you
- Scientific career
- Fields: Human Computer Interface, Gamification, UX research and Innovation
- Institutions: Imperial College London

Sebastian Deterding is a German scientist. He is currently Chair in Design Engineering and Professor of Design Engineering at Imperial College, London. Previously, he held the position of Chair Professor of Digital Creativity at the University of York. He established the gamification research network and co-authored "The Gameful World" (MIT Press, 2015), a book delving into the integration of gaming elements into various aspects of culture.

== Career ==
Deterding is the founder and lead designer of Coding Conduct, a design agency. His collaborations have spanned a range of eminent clients, including the BBC, BMW, Deutsche Telekom, Greenpeace, Novartis, Otto Group, along with numerous startups. He also established the Gamification Research Network and co-authored "The Gameful World" (MIT Press, 2015), a book delving into the integration of gaming elements into various aspects of culture.

Deterding delivered a TED talk on "What your designs say about you"

== Awards and honours ==
- Editor-in-chief: Games: Research and Practice (ACM Digital Library)
- Chair in Design Engineering' at Imperial College London
- Chair Professor of Digital Creativity at the University of York

== Books ==
- The Gameful World: Approaches, Issues, Applications (MIT Press, 16 Jan 2015)
