= Teaching machine =

Educational mechanical device

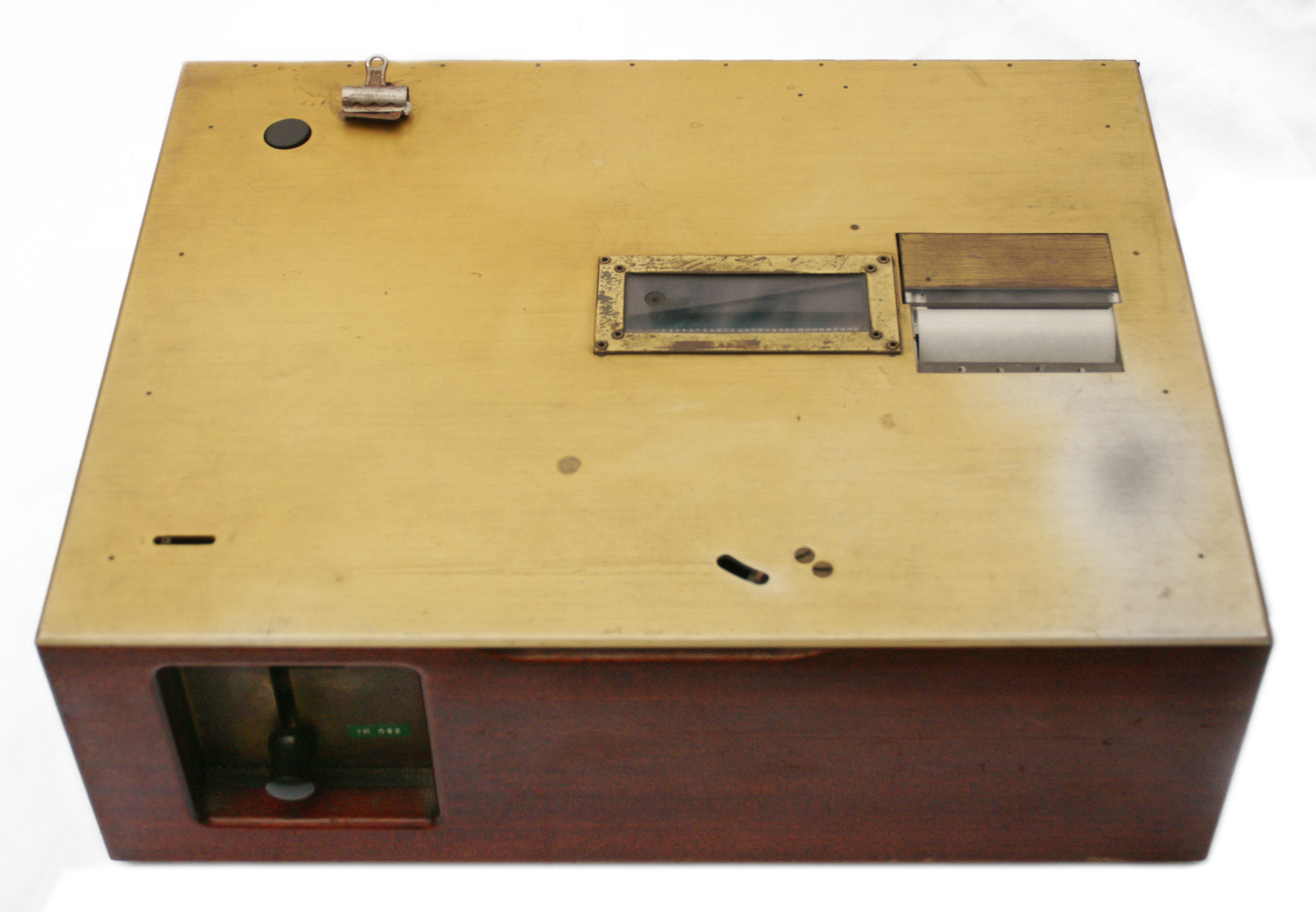
Skinner's teaching machine, a mechanical device to control student progress in programmed instruction

Teaching machines were originally mechanical devices that presented educational materials and taught students. They were first invented by Sidney L. Pressey in the mid-1920s. His machine originally administered multiple-choice questions. The machine could be set so it moved on only when the student got the right answer. Tests showed that learning had taken place. This was an example of how knowledge of results causes learning. Much later, Norman Crowder developed the Pressey idea further.

B. F. Skinner was responsible for a different type of machine which used his ideas on how learning should be directed with positive reinforcement. Skinner advocated the use of teaching machines for a broad range of students (e.g., preschool aged to adult) and instructional purposes (e.g., reading and music). The instructional potential of the teaching machine stemmed from several factors: it provided automatic, immediate and regular reinforcement without the use of aversive control; the material presented was coherent, yet varied and novel; the pace of learning could be adjusted to suit the individual. As a result, students were interested, attentive, and learned efficiently by producing the desired behavior, "learning by doing".

There is extensive experience that both methods worked well, and so did programmed learning in other forms, such as books. The ideas of teaching machines and programmed learning provided the basis for later ideas such as open learning and computer-assisted instruction.

Illustrations of early teaching machines can be found in the 1960 sourcebook, Teaching Machines and Programmed Learning. An "Autotutor" was demonstrated at the 1964 World's Fair.

== Quotes ==
- Edward L. Thorndike in 1912: "If, by a miracle of mechanical ingenuity, a book could be so arranged that only to him who had done what was directed on page one would page two become visible, and so on, much that now requires personal instruction could be managed by print".
- Sidney L. Pressey in 1932: "Education was the one major activity in this country which has thus far not systematically applied ingenuity to the solution of its problems" (p. 668). He thought the machine he developed would lead to an "Industrial Revolution in Education" (p. 672).

== See also ==
- Educational technology
- Programmed learning
- B. F. Skinner § Teaching machine
