= Arthur A. Lumsdaine =

American psychologist

Arthur Allen Lumsdaine (1913–1989) was an American applied psychologist who researched the use of media and programmed learning. Lumsdaine served in the U.S. Army in World War II. He was recruited by Carl Hovland, who was then Chief Psychologist and Director of Experimental Studies for the Research Branch of the Information and Education Division of the U.S. War Department. Lumsdaine later took a PhD in psychology at Stanford University (awarded 1949).

Service in the Army showed him the crucial role played by training in any large army conscripted from the general population. Lumsdaine’s main work was on the effectiveness of media for training and education. He also worked on the experimental investigation of attitude change. He played a leading part in the post-World War II wave of experimental psychologists who worked on the principles of education and training.

Lumsdaine saw the potential of teaching machines and programmed instruction and helped their development. Art was a Fellow of the American Association for the Advancement of Science, as well as of the American Psychological Association (APA). He served as a member of the APA's Board of Scientific Affairs (1967–1970), was President of the Division of Educational Psychology (1968–1969), and was an Associate Editor of Contemporary Psychology for eight years.

== Main works ==
- Lumsdaine A.A. 1947. Experimental research and the improvement of teaching films. Educational Screen 26, 254/5.
- Lumsdaine A.A. 1949. Ease of learning with pictorial and verbal symbols. Unpublished doctoral dissertation, Stanford University.
- Hovland C.I; Lumsdaine A.A. & Sheffield F.D. 1949. Experiments on mass communication. Princeton University Press.
- Lumsdaine A.A. 1953. Audio-visual research in the U.S. Air Force. AV Communication Review 1, 76–90.
- May M.A. & Lumsdaine A.A. 1958. Learning from films. Yale University Press.
- Lumsdaine A.A. 1959. Partial and more complete automation of teaching in group and individual learning situations. In E.H. Galanter (ed) Automated teaching: the state of the art. New York: Wiley, 147–166.
- Lumsdaine A.A. 1959. Teaching machines and self-instructional materials. AV Communication Review 7, 163–181.
- Lumsdaine A.A. & Glaser R. (eds) 1960. Teaching machines and programmed learning: a source book. Washington DC: National Education Association. Teaching machines and programmed learning video https://www.youtube.com/watch?v=1M6YTRCuR6s
- Lumsdaine A.A. 1961. Some differences in approach to the programming of instruction. In Lysaught J.P. (ed) Programmed learning: evolving principles and industrial applications. Ann Arbor: Foundation for Research on Human Behavior, 37–52.
- Lumsdaine A.A. (ed) 1961. Student response in programmed instruction: a symposium. Washington DC: National Academy of Sciences-National Research Council, publication #943.
- Lumsdaine A.A. & Roshal S.M. 1962. Experimental research on educational media. University of California Press.
- Lumsdaine A.A. 1962, published 1965. Experimental research on instructional devices and materials. In Glaser R. (ed) Training research and education. New York: Wiley, 247–294.
- Lumsdaine A.A. 1963. Instruments and media of instruction. In Gage N.L. (ed) Handbook of research on teaching. A project of the American Educational Research Association. Chicago: Rand McNally, 583–682.
- Lumsdaine A.A. 1964. Educational technology, programmed instruction, and instructional sciences. In Hilgard E.R. (ed) Theories of learning and instruction. 63rd yearbook of the National Society for the Study of Education, Part 1. Chicago University Press, 371–401.
- Lumsdaine A.A. 1965. Assessing the effectiveness of instructional programs. In Glaser R. (ed) Teaching machines and programmed learning II: data and directions. Washington DC: National Education Association, 267–320.
- Lindsley, Donald B. & Lumsdaine, Arthur A. 1967. Brain function and learning: Brain function Volume IV: Proceedings of the fourth conference, November 1964. University of California Press.
- Bennett, Carl A. & Lumsdaine, Arthur A. (eds) 1974. Evaluation and experiment: some critical issues in assessing social problems. Academic Press.
- Wittrock M.C. & Lumsdaine A.A. 1977. Instructional psychology. In Rosenzweig M.R. & Porter L.W. (eds) Annual Review of Psychology, 28. Palo Alto: Annual Reviews.
