= Gamification =

Using game design elements in non-games

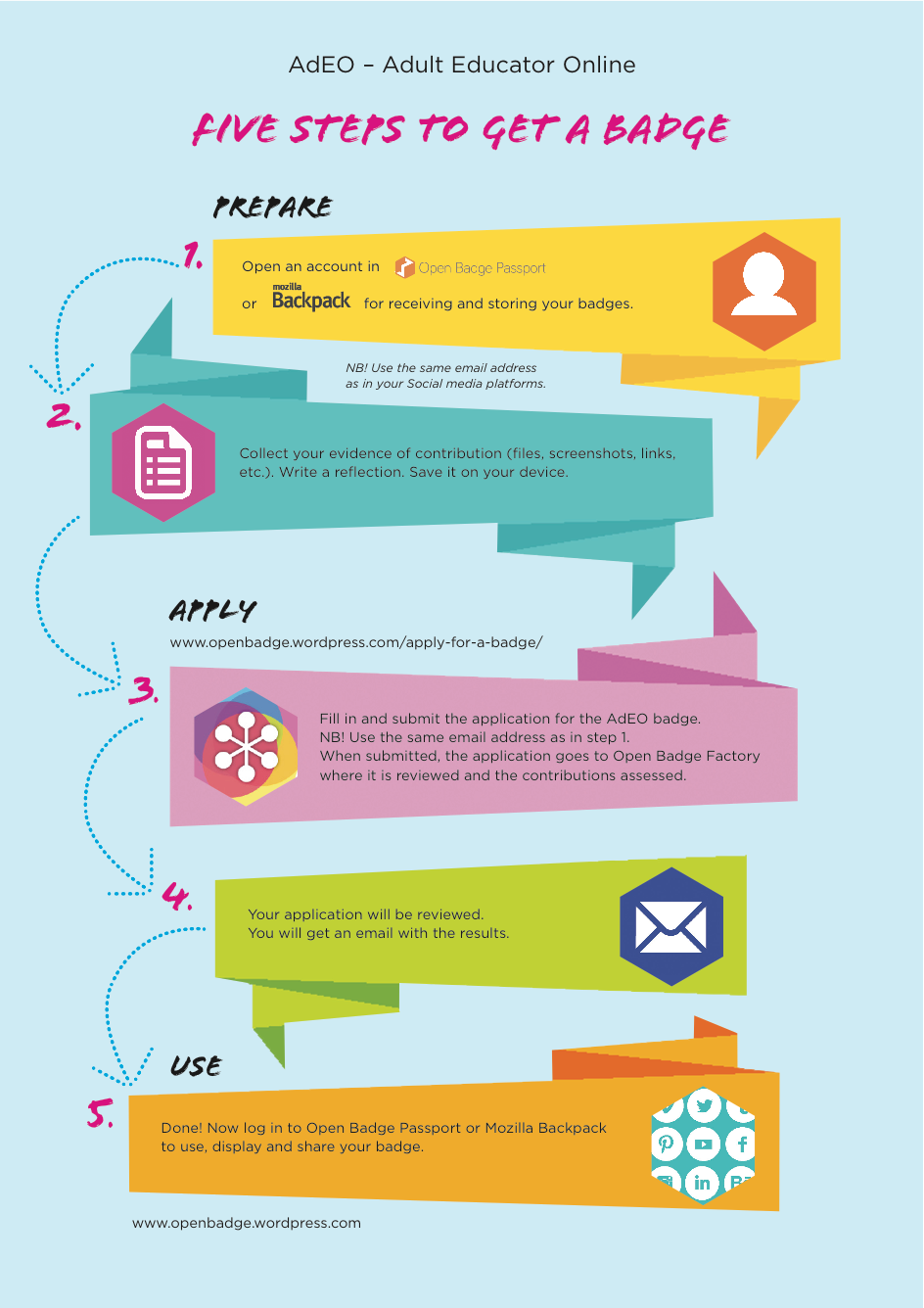
Infographic explaining how to apply for and receive an Open Badge, a product of the Nordplus Adult project Open Badges for Adult Educators 2014-2016

Gamification is the process of integrating game design elements and principles (such as points, badges, and leaderboards) into non-game contexts in order to increase user engagement and motivation. It is a component of system design. Gamification has been used to improve organizational productivity, flow, learning, crowdsourcing, knowledge retention, employee recruitment and evaluation, usability, usefulness of systems, physical exercise, tailored interactions and icebreaker activities in dating apps, traffic violations, voter apathy, public attitudes about alternative energy, and more.

== Techniques ==
Gamification techniques leverage people's desires for socializing, learning, mastery, competition, achievement, status, self-expression, altruism, and closure, or simply their response to framing a situation as a game. Players are engaged using competition and rewards for completing tasks. Rewards can include points, badges, levels, progress bar, and virtual currency. Making the rewards for accomplishing tasks visible to other players (e.g., leaderboards) encourages players to compete. Meaningful choice, onboarding tutorials, increasing challenge, and adding narrative are other ways to make tasks feel more like games.

== Game elements ==
Game elements are the building blocks of gamification applications. They commonly include points, badges, leaderboards, performance graphs, meaningful stories, avatars, and teammates.

=== Points ===
Points are basic elements of a multitude of games and gamified applications. They are typically rewarded for the successful accomplishment of specified activities within the gamified environment and they serve to numerically represent a player's progress. Various kinds of points can be differentiated between, e.g. experience points, redeemable points, or reputation points, as can the different purposes that points serve. One of the most important purposes of points is to provide feedback. Points allow the players' in-game behavior to be measured, and they serve as continuous and immediate feedback and as a reward.

=== Badges ===
Badges are defined as visual representations of achievements and can be earned and collected within the gamification environment. They confirm the players' achievements, symbolize their merits, and visibly show their accomplishment of levels or goals. Earning a badge can be dependent on a specific number of points or on particular activities within the game. Badges have many functions, serving as goals, if the prerequisites for winning them are known to the player, or as virtual status symbols. In the same way as points, badges also provide feedback, in that they indicate how the players have performed. Badges can influence players' behavior, leading them to select certain routes and challenges in order to earn badges that are associated with them. Additionally, as badges symbolize one's membership in a group of those who own this particular badge, they also can exert social influences on players and co-players.

=== Leaderboards ===
Leaderboards rank players according to their relative success, measuring them against a certain success criterion. As such, leaderboards can help determine who performs best in a certain activity and are thus competitive indicators of progress that relate the player's own performance to the performance of others. However, the motivational potential of leaderboards is mixed. Werbach and Hunter regard them as effective motivators if there are only a few points left to the next level or position, but as demotivators, if players find themselves at the bottom end of the leaderboard. Competition caused by leaderboards can create social pressure to increase the player's level of engagement and can consequently have a constructive effect on participation and learning. However, these positive effects of competition are more likely if the respective competitors are approximately at the same performance level.

=== Performance graphs ===
Performance graphs provide information about the players' performance compared to their preceding performance during a game. Thus, in contrast to leaderboards, performance graphs do not compare the player's performance to other players, but instead, evaluate the player's own performance over time. Unlike the social reference standard of leaderboards, performance graphs are based on an individual reference standard. By graphically displaying the player's performance over a fixed period, they focus on improvements. Motivation theory postulates that this fosters mastery orientation, which is particularly beneficial to learning.

=== Meaningful stories ===
Meaningful stories are game design elements unrelated to player performance. The narrative context in which a gamified application can be embedded contextualizes activities and characters in the game and gives them meaning beyond the mere quest for points and achievements. A story can be communicated by a game's title (e.g., Space Invaders) or by complex storylines typical of contemporary role-playing video games (e.g., The Elder Scrolls Series). Narrative contexts can be oriented towards real, non-game contexts or act as analogies of real-world settings. The latter can enrich otherwise unstimulating contexts, and, consequently, inspire and motivate players particularly if the story is in line with their personal interests.

=== Avatars ===
Avatars are visual representations of players within the game or gamification environment. Usually, they are chosen or even created by the player. Avatars can be designed quite simply as a mere pictogram, or they can be complexly animated, three-dimensional representations. Their primary requirement is that they unmistakably identify the players and set them apart from other human or computer-controlled avatars. Avatars allow the players to adopt or create another identity and, in cooperative games, to become part of a community.

=== Teammates ===
Teammates, whether they are other real players or virtual non-player characters, can induce conflict, competition or cooperation. The latter can be fostered particularly by introducing teams, i.e. by creating defined groups of players that work together towards a shared objective. Meta-analytic evidence supports that the combination of competition and collaboration in games is likely to be effective for learning.

== Game element hierarchy ==
The described game elements fit within a broader framework, which involves three types of elements: dynamics, mechanics, and components. These elements constitute the hierarchy of game elements.

Dynamics are the highest in the hierarchy. They represent the broader aspects of the gamified system that should be considered and managed; however, they never directly enter into the game. Dynamics elements provide motivation through features such as narrative or social interaction.

Mechanics are the basic processes that drive the action forward and generate player engagement and involvement. Examples are chance, turns, and rewards.

Components are the specific instantiations of mechanics and dynamics; elements like points, quests, and virtual goods.

== Applications ==
=== Marketing ===
In November 2011, Australian broadcast and online media partnership Yahoo!7 launched its Fango mobile app/SAP, which TV viewers use to interact with shows via techniques like check-ins and badges. Gamification has also been used in customer loyalty programs. In 2010, Starbucks gave custom Foursquare badges to people who checked in at multiple locations, and offered discounts to people who checked in most frequently at an individual store.

Gamification also has been used as a tool for customer engagement, and for encouraging desirable website usage behaviour. Additionally, gamification is applicable to increasing engagement on sites built on social network services. For example, in August 2010, the website builder DevHub announced an increase in the number of users who completed their online tasks from 10% to 80% after adding gamification elements. On the programming question-and-answer site Stack Overflow users receive points and/or badges for performing a variety of actions, including spreading links to questions and answers via Facebook and Twitter. A large number of different badges are available, and when a user's reputation points exceed various thresholds, the user gains additional privileges, eventually including moderator privileges.

Gamification can be used for ideation (structured brainstorming to produce new ideas). A study at MIT Sloan found that ideation games helped participants generate more and better ideas, and compared it to gauging the influence of academic papers by the numbers of citations received in subsequent research.

=== Loyalty applications of gamification ===
Gamification has become a widely adopted strategy in customer loyalty programs, with brands integrating interactive mechanics such as points systems, tiered rewards, challenges, and instant win games to drive repeat purchasing and long-term retention. Digital loyalty experiences, including game centre applications, allow companies to reward customers for ongoing engagement beyond the point of sale, leading to more regular interaction with the brand.

=== Health ===
Applications like Fitocracy and QUENTIQ (Dacadoo) use gamification to encourage their users to exercise more effectively and improve their overall health. Users are awarded varying numbers of points for activities they perform in their workouts, and gain levels based on points collected. Users can also complete quests (sets of related activities) and gain achievement badges for fitness milestones. Health Month adds aspects of social gaming by allowing successful users to restore points to users who have failed to meet certain goals. Public health researchers have studied the use of gamification in self-management of chronic diseases and common mental disorders, STD prevention, and infection prevention and control.

In a review of health apps in the 2014 Apple App Store, more than 100 apps showed a positive correlation between gamification elements used and high user ratings. MyFitnessPal was named as the app that used the most gamification elements.

Further, many applications have been proposed to reduce the impact of low air quality on health.

=== Work ===
Gamification has been used in healthcare, financial services, transportation, government, and others. Game elements, such as experience points, badges, and other progress indicators, have been shown to enhance user engagement and productivity in business learning programs. Gamification can enhance employee engagement, motivation, and skill development by incorporating elements such as challenges, progress tracking, and rewards. However, gamification can also build resentment and drive unsafe personal behavior in the workplace, such as workers skipping bathroom breaks.

=== Human resources applications of gamification ===
Within Human Resources, gamification can be leveraged to enhance employee engagement, training, and development. By integrating interactivity into HR processes, companies have been able to foster a more engaged and motivated workforce. Specifically with regards to training, gamification has been proven to improve knowledge retention.

In recent years, gamification platforms have also been incorporated into employee benefits programs to drive participation, improve retention rates, and boost motivation with rewards such as discounts, extra vacation days, and wellness perks.

=== Crowdsourcing ===
Crowdsourcing has been gamified in games like Foldit, a game designed by the University of Washington, in which players compete to manipulate proteins into more efficient structures. A 2010 paper in science journal Nature credited Foldit's 57,000 players with providing useful results that matched or outperformed algorithmically computed solutions. The ESP Game is a game that is used to generate image metadata. Google Image Labeler is a version of the ESP Game that Google has licensed to generate its own image metadata. Research from the University of Bonn used gamification to increase wiki contributions by 62%.

In the context of online crowdsourcing, gamification is also employed to improve the psychological and behavioral consequences of the solvers. According to numerous research, adding gamification components to a crowdsourcing platform can be considered as a design that shifts participants' focus from task completion to involvement motivated by intrinsic factors. Since the success of crowdsourcing competitions depends on a large number of participating solvers, the platforms for crowdsourcing provide motivating factors to increase participation by drawing on the concepts of the game.

=== Education and training ===
Gamification in the context of education and training is of particular interest because it offers a variety of benefits associated with learning outcomes and retention. Using video-game inspired elements like leaderboards and badges has been shown to be effective in engaging large groups and providing objectives for students to achieve outside of traditional norms like grades or verbal feedback. Online learning platforms such as Khan Academy and even physical schools like New York City Department of Education's Quest to Learn use gamification to motivate students to complete mission-based units and master concepts. There is also an increasing interest in the use of gamification in health sciences and education as an engaging information delivery tool and in order to add variety to revision. A 2016 study found that gamification can help students learn more effectively, especially when they are motivated by curiosity or enjoyment of the learning itself. One study found that students who were more intrinsically motivated tended to benefit more from gamified learning, while those focused mainly on external rewards didn't respond as strongly.

With increased access to one-to-one student devices, and accelerated by pressure from the COVID-19 pandemic, many teachers from primary to post-secondary settings have introduced live, online quiz-show style games into their lessons.

Gamification has also been used to promote learning outside of schools. In August 2009, Gbanga launched a game for the Zurich Zoo where participants learned about endangered species by collecting animals in mixed reality. Companies seeking to train their customers to use their product effectively can showcase features of their products with interactive games like Microsoft's Ribbon Hero 2.

A wide range of employers including the United States Armed Forces, Unilever, and SAP currently use gamified training modules to educate their employees and motivate them to apply what they learned in trainings to their job. According to a study conducted by Badgeville, 78% of workers are utilizing games-based motivation at work and nearly 91% say these systems improve their work experience by increasing engagement, awareness and productivity. In the form of occupational safety training, technology can provide realistic and effective simulations of real-life experiences, making safety training less passive and more engaging, more flexible in terms of time management and a cost-effective alternative to practice. Additionally, the combined use of virtual reality and gamification can provide more effective solutions in terms of knowledge acquisition and retention when they are compared with traditional training methods.

=== Technology design ===
Traditionally, researchers thought of motivations to use computer systems to be primarily driven by extrinsic purposes; however, many modern systems have their use driven primarily by intrinsic motivations. Examples of such systems used primarily to fulfill users' intrinsic motivations, include online gaming, virtual worlds, online shopping, learning/education, online dating, digital music repositories, social networking, online pornography, and so on. Such systems are excellent candidates for further 'gamification' in their design. Moreover, even traditional management information systems (e.g., ERP, CRM) are being 'gamified' such that both extrinsic and intrinsic motivations must increasingly be considered.

As an illustration, Microsoft has announced plans to use gamification techniques for its Windows Phone 7 operating system design. While businesses face the challenges of creating motivating gameplay strategies, what makes for effective gamification is a key question.

One important type of technological design in gamification is the player centered design. Based on the design methodology user-centered design, its main goal is to promote greater connectivity and positive behavior change between technological consumers. It has five steps that help computer users connect with other people online to help them accomplish goals and other tasks they need to complete. The 5 steps are: an individual or company has to know their player (their target audience), identify their mission (their goal), understand human motivation (the personality, desires, and triggers of the target audience), apply mechanics (points, badges, leaderboards, etc.), and to manage, monitor, and measure the way they are using their mechanics to ensure it is helping them achieve the desired outcome of their goal and that their goal is specific and realistic.

=== Authentication ===
Gamification has also been applied to authentication. Games have been proposed as a way for users to learn new and more complicated passwords. Gamification has also been proposed as a way to select and manage archives.

=== Online gambling ===
The merging of gambling and gamification referred to as "gamblification" has been used to some extent by online casinos. Some brands use an incremental reward system to extend the typical player lifecycle and to encourage repeat visits and cash deposits at the casino in return for rewards such as free spins and cash match bonuses on subsequent deposits.

== Gamification platforms ==
Platform gamification has become a fast-growing industry. These platforms let companies create for example: brand-customised, interactive experiences for marketing, internal communications and events. Often, platforms will offer a variety of game formats, so that businesses can tailor the length and content of these experiences to fit their objectives, with no coding expertise or in-house fees. Using ready-made templates as opposed to building bespoke experiences accelerates time-to-market for users. This reduces cost when compared to in-house development, and allows a range of businesses to leverage the expertise of developers who specialise in game development.

Among these ready-made templates, certain games are built to serve specific goals. For example: Instant win games (such as scratch cards or spin the wheels) drive short-term engagement and conversions by offering immediate rewards. Quizzes and surveys boost data acquisition, enablement, and training by capturing insights and guiding user behaviour.

== History ==
The term "gamification" first appeared online in the context of computer software in 2008. (Note: In 2011 British-born videogame developer Nick Pelling self-proclaimed to have coined the term in 2002 as part of his startup Conundra Ltd. for the field of consumer electronics, and many books and scholarly articles subsequently cite this as the likely genesis of the term.) Gamification did not gain popularity until 2010. Even prior to the term coming into use, other fields borrowing elements from videogames was common; for example, some work in learning disabilities and scientific visualization adapted elements from videogames.

The term "gamification" first gained widespread usage in 2010, in a more specific sense referring to incorporation of social/reward aspects of games into software. The technique captured the attention of venture capitalists, one of whom said he considered gamification the most promising area in gaming. Another observed that half of all companies seeking funding for consumer software applications mentioned game design in their presentations.

Several researchers consider gamification closely related to earlier work on adapting game-design elements and techniques to non-game contexts. Deterding et al. survey research in human–computer interaction that uses game-derived elements for motivation and interface design, and Nelson argues for a connection to both the Soviet concept of socialist competition, and the American management trend of "fun at work". Fuchs points out that gamification might be driven by new forms of ludic interfaces. Gamification conferences have also retroactively incorporated simulation; e.g. Will Wright, designer of the 1989 video game SimCity, was the keynote speaker at the gamification conference Gsummit 2013.

In October 2007, Bunchball was the first company to provide game mechanics as a service, on Dunder Mifflin Infinity, the community site for the NBC TV show The Office. Badgeville, which offered gamification services, launched in late 2010, and raised $15 million in venture-capital funding in its first year of operation.

Gabe Zichermann coined "funware" as an alternative term for gamification.

Gamification as an educational and behavior modification tool reached the public sector by 2012, when the United States Department of Energy co-funded multiple research trials, including consumer behavior studies, adapting the format of Programmed learning into mobile microlearning to experiment with the impacts of gamification in reducing energy use.

Gamification 2013, an event exploring the future of gamification, was held at the University of Waterloo Stratford Campus in October 2013.

== Regulation and policy ==
A March 2022 consultation paper by the Board of the International Organization of Securities Commissions (IOSCO) questions whether some gamification tactics should be banned.

== Reception ==
The majority of scientific studies on gamification find it has positive effects on individuals. However, individual and contextual differences exist.

=== Criticism ===
University of Hamburg researcher Sebastian Deterding has characterized the initial popular strategies for gamification as not being fun and creating an artificial sense of achievement. He also says that gamification can encourage unintended behaviours.

Poorly designed gamification in the workplace has been compared to Taylorism, and is considered a form of micromanagement.

In a review of 132 of the top health and fitness apps in the Apple app store, in 2014, using gamification as a method to modify behavior, the authors concluded that "Despite the inclusion of at least some components of gamification, the mean scores of integration of gamification components were still below 50 percent. This was also true for the inclusion of game elements and the use of health behavior theory constructs, thus showing a lack of following any clear industry standard of effective gaming, gamification, or behavioral theory in health and fitness apps."

Concern was also expressed in a 2016 study analyzing outcome data from 1,298 users who competed in gamified and incentivized exercise challenges while wearing wearable devices. In that study the authors conjectured that data may be highly skewed by cohorts of already healthy users, rather than the intended audiences of participants requiring behavioral intervention.

Game designers like Jon Radoff and Margaret Robertson have also criticized gamification as excluding elements like storytelling and experiences and using simple reward systems in place of true game mechanics.

Gamification practitioners have pointed out that while the initial popular designs were in fact mostly relying on simplistic reward approach, even those led to significant improvements in short-term engagement. This was supported by the first comprehensive study in 2014, which concluded that an increase in gamification elements correlated with an increase in motivation score, but not with capacity or opportunity/trigger scores.

The same study called for standardization across the app industry on gamification principles to improve the effectiveness of health apps on the health outcomes of users.

MIT Professor Kevin Slavin has described business research into gamification as flawed and misleading for those unfamiliar with gaming. Heather Chaplin, writing in Slate, describes gamification as "an allegedly populist idea that actually benefits corporate interests over those of ordinary people". Jane McGonigal has distanced her work from the label "gamification", listing rewards outside of gameplay as the central idea of gamification and distinguishing game applications where the gameplay itself is the reward under the term "gameful design".

"Gamification" as a term has also been criticized. Ian Bogost has referred to the term as a marketing fad and suggested "exploitation-ware" as a more suitable name for the games used in marketing. Proponents have asserted that the term effectively communicates the fundamental concept.

In an article by the Los Angeles Times, the gamification of worker engagement at Disneyland was described as an "electronic whip". Workers had reported feeling controlled and overworked by the system.

==== Ethical concerns ====
Some extremist websites have used gamification elements, such as points, status levels, and avatars, to encourage participation in their online forums.

The website 8chan has also been criticized for gamifying violence. In 2019, three mass shooters, starting with the Christchurch attacker, posted to 8chan before launching their attacks. The Christchurch shooter livestreamed his attack using a helmet cam and soundtrack, making his livestream reminiscent of a first-person shooter video game. The Poway and El Paso shooters copied elements of this attack, including posting to 8chan prior to their attacks. The Poway shooter also attempted to livestream. Since the Christchurch attack, users on 8chan have discussed mass shootings in gamified terms, referencing bodycounts as high scores to beat.

== See also ==
- Bartle taxonomy of player types
- Dark pattern
- Egoboo, a component of some gamification strategies
- Gamification of learning
- GNS theory
