= Badgeville =

American technology company

Badgeville, Inc.
- Type: Private
- Industry: Software as a service (SaaS), Gamfication, Computer Software
- Founded: 27 September 2010
- Founder: Kris Duggan; Wedge Martin
- Headquarters: 2014; 12 years ago, in Redwood City, California
- Area served: Worldwide
- Key people: Jon Shalowitz (CEO & president)
- Products: Behavior Platform, Badgeville for Communities
- Number of employees: 70 (Q1 2012)
- Website: www.badgeville.com badgeville.com/wiki

Badgeville, Inc. was a privately held technology company founded in 2010 with headquarters in Redwood City, California, and an additional office in New York. The firm provided software as a service (SaaS) for web sites to measure and influence user behaviour using techniques such as gamification.

Badgeville technology was acquired by CallidusCloud in 2016, which was in turn acquired by SAP in 2018.

== History ==
The company was founded by Kris Duggan and Wedge Martin, and launched at TechCrunch Disrupt on September 27, 2010 . At that time, the company had raised less than $300k in angel funding.

In November 2010, the firm raised a $2.5M Series A round led by El Dorado Ventures and Trinity Ventures. Badgeville subsequently raised a $12M Series B Round in July 2011, led by Norwest Venture Partners and El Dorado Ventures.

In November 2011, Badgeville unveiled the Behavior Platform for Enterprise. They expanded their business beyond gamification to include enterprise employee management and community reputation systems.

== Social Fabric ==
Social Fabric was a service launched by Badgeville in September 2011. It was designed to increase user engagement and loyalty. It was offered to clients as a SaaS to allow websites to include social networking elements. Social Fabric offered activity stream based on an algorithm that contextualized it to the user's activities, interests, and friends. Social Fabric also provided notifications and alerts.
