= Bunchball =

Software company

- Available in: English
- Founder: Rajat Paharia
- Website: www.bunchball.com
- Launched: 2005
- Current status: Active

Bunchball provides a cloud-based software as a service gamification product intended to help companies improve customer loyalty and online engagement using game mechanics. Bunchball was founded by Rajat Paharia in 2005 and has raised $17.5 million in funding. In 2018, Bunchball was acquired by BI Worldwide for an undisclosed amount.

== History ==
In 2005, Rajat Paharia founded Bunchball. He approached companies like Facebook, Myspace, and dating websites with the proposition of integrating social games. Bunchball received initial financing from Sunil Singh, the CEO of Informance International, and Payman Pouladdej, an angel investor.

In October 2006, the company closed a $2 million Series A investment round from Granite Ventures and Adobe Ventures. In 2007, NBC hired Bunchball to develop a community website called Dunder Mifflin Infinity for the popular comedy show, The Office. In 2007, Bunchball transitioned from social gaming and launched Nitro, which allows organizations to implement game mechanics in social networks, mobile applications, and websites.

In January 2008, Bunchball received an additional $4 million in a Series B funding round from return investors Granite Ventures and Adobe Ventures. At the time of the announcement, Bunchball had 28 employees. In June 2010, Bunchball closed a $6.5 million Series C funding round from Triangle Peak Partners, Northport Investments, Correlation Ventures and Granite Ventures. Bunchball now has 60 employees and has raised $21 million to date.

== Software ==
Bunchball Nitro is a gamification platform which aims to motivate online user engagement. It contains a set of game mechanics, including badges, team points, and leader boards for websites, social communities, mobile applications, and desktop and enterprise applications. It currently generates 70 million unique users and 2.3 billion actions each month. In March 2012, Bunchball released an updated version of Nitro, code-named Flamethrower.

Bunchball Nitro for Salesforce motivates sales teams by adding gamification to Salesforce.com. The Jive Gamification Module is an add-on module of the Jive social business platform, and is powered by Bunchball Nitro. It gives users a set of missions to complete, each of which exposes them to a critical piece of functionality within the Jive platform. Nitro for IBM Connections helps businesses train new users and keep existing users engaged within the IBM Connections application. Using the Nitro platform, businesses can employ gamification techniques, like completing missions and earning rewards, to engage users with IBM Connections.

== Major projects ==
In 2007, 40,000 people generated more than 1 million page views on Dunder Mifflin Infinity, a separate NBC Universal website which Bunchball developed. Dunder Mifflin Infinity gives users the experience of being an "employee" at Dunder Mifflin, the fictional company featured in the show.

In 2009, the USA Network hired Bunchball to "gamify" the website of Psych, a television show. Page views surged to 16 million last season, up from 9 million the season before. The average visitor came 4 to 5 times per month, compared with just twice a month the previous season, and stayed on the site for 22 minutes a visit, up from 14 minutes.

In December 2010, Bunchball Nitro powered Playboy’s Facebook app, called Miss Social, which was a month-long competition between women who aspired to be in Playboy. Due to the competition, Playboy saw an 85 percent rate of re-engagement and a 60 percent improvement in revenues from one month to the next. Since starting the app in December, Playboy’s active user base has grown to 80,000.

In 2011, Bunchball partnered up with the Los Angeles Kings to gamify their fan website.
