= Ken Stroud =

Author of mathematics textbooks

Kenneth Arthur Stroud (/straʊd/; 28 September 1908 in Richmond, Surrey – 3 February 2000 in Hertfordshire township) was a mathematician and Principal Lecturer in Mathematics at Lanchester Polytechnic in Coventry, England. He is most widely known as the author of several mathematics textbooks, especially the very popular Engineering Mathematics.

== Education ==
Stroud held a B.Sc. and a DipEd.

== Work ==
Stroud was an innovator in programmed learning and the identification of precise learning outcomes, and Nigel Steele calls his textbook Engineering Mathematics, based on the programmed learning approach, "one of the most successful mathematics textbooks ever published."

He died in February 2000, aged 91.

== Bibliography ==
- Laplace Transforms: Programmes and Problems, Stanley Thornes Ltd, 1973, ISBN 0-85950-002-0 and 1978, ISBN 978-0-85950-002-9.
- Fourier Series and Harmonic Analysis, Nelson Thornes Ltd, 1983, ISBN 0-85950-137-X and Stanley Thornes Ltd, 1986, ISBN 978-0-85950-137-8.
- Engineering Mathematics, Macmillan, 1970, ISBN 0-333-10908-2. 6th ed., (with Dexter J. Booth), Industrial Press, 2007, ISBN 978-0-8311-3327-6.
- Advanced Engineering Mathematics (with Dexter J. Booth), 5th ed., Industrial Press, 2011, ISBN 978-0-8311-3449-5, 4th ed., Palgrave Macmillan, 2003, ISBN 978-1-4039-0312-9.
- Differential Equations (with Dexter J. Booth), Industrial Press, 2004, ISBN 978-0-8311-3187-6.
- Vector Analysis (with Dexter J. Booth), Industrial Press, 2005, ISBN 978-0-8311-3208-8.
- Complex Variables (with Dexter J. Booth), Industrial Press, 2007, ISBN 978-0-8311-3266-8.
- Linear Algebra (with Dexter J. Booth), Industrial Press, 2008, ISBN 978-0-8311-3188-3.
- Essential Mathematics for Science and Technology: A Self-Learning Guide (with Dexter J. Booth), Industrial Press, 2009, ISBN 978-0-8311-3391-7.
- Further Engineering Mathematics : Programmes and Problems, Palgrave Macmillan, 3 October 1986, ISBN 0-333-34875-3. 2nd ed., Springer-Verlag, 1 November 1989, ISBN 0-387-91280-0. 2nd ed., Palgrave Macmillan, June 1990, ISBN 0-333-52610-4. 3rd Revised Edition, Palgrave Macmillan, 27 March 1996, ISBN 0-333-65741-1.
- Mathematics for engineering technicians, Stanley Thornes Ltd., 1978, ISBN 0-85950-088-8. Book 2A : Practical applications, Stanley Thornes Ltd., 1981, ISBN 0-85950-469-7.
