= Programmed learning =

Use of programmed texts or teaching machines

Programmed learning (or programmed instruction) is a research-based system which helps learners work successfully. The method is guided by research done by a variety of applied psychologists and educators.

The learning material is in a kind of textbook or teaching machine or computer. The medium presents the material in a logical and tested sequence. The text is in small steps or larger chunks. After each step, learners are given a question to test their comprehension. Then immediately the correct answer is shown. This means the learner at all stages makes responses, and is given immediate knowledge of results.

Anticipating programmed learning, Edward L. Thorndike wrote in 1912:

If, by a miracle of mechanical ingenuity, a book could be so arranged that only to him who had done what was directed on page one would page two become visible, and so on, much that now requires personal instruction could be managed by print.

— Edward L. Thorndike, Education: A First Book

Thorndike, however, did nothing with his idea. The first such system was devised by Sidney L. Pressey in 1926. "The first... [teaching machine] was developed by Sidney L. Pressey... While originally developed as a self-scoring machine... [it] demonstrated its ability to actually teach."

== Later developments of programmed learning ==
In World War II, with largely conscript armies, there was great emphasis on training. What was learnt influenced education and training after the war. One of the main methods was the use of film as a group training method. Research on the effectiveness of training films was done extensively. In one account, Lumsdaine comments that research on films went on "from about 1918 to the present" (meaning 1962).

A few conclusions stood out from the research. First, films were great at giving overviews of a situation or an operation. However, they were less successful at getting over the details. Some general features of film (and, later, television) stand out. One is that a film goes at its own pace. Another is that no specific responses or activities are required from the viewer. A third is that the audience is varied, sometimes hugely varied. This gives clues to ways of improving instructional films.

In a 1946 experiment at Yale University, questions for students were put between segments of a film on the heart and circulation, with correct answers given after students had responded (knowledge of results). This added significantly to the amount learnt from the film. Lumsdaine commented that showing the version with questions and answers was as effective as showing the film twice, and faster.^{612}

The connections between this experiment and those of Pressey were obvious. Active responses by learners and helpful feedback on the activities were now seen as critical elements in any successful system of learning. Pressey's work had been half forgotten, but it was now recognised as significant.

== Programmed learning arrives ==
=== What is programmed learning? ===
If so much research had already been done on learning from films, what exactly did programmed learning add? The short answer is "stimulus control", by which is broadly meant the teaching material itself. Also, in programmed learning, a complete system was proposed which included these stages:

1. The aims of the course are stated in terms which are objective, and can be measured.
2. A pre-test is given, or the initial behaviour is stated.
3. A post-test is provided.
4. The materials have been tried out and revised according to results (developmental testing).
5. The materials are constructed according to a predetermined scheme (stimulus control).
6. The material is arranged in appropriate steps.
7. The learner has to respond actively (not necessarily overtly).
8. Arrangements are made for responses to be confirmed (knowledge of results).
9. The teaching medium is appropriate for the subject-matter and the students.
10. The materials are self-paced or presented in a manner which suits the learner.

A helpful discussion of the different programming techniques was given by Klaus.

=== The two main systems of programmed learning ===
Although there were three or four other systems proposed, we discuss here the two best-known methods.

One was by Norman Crowder, a psychologist with the U.S. Air Force. He had been asked to investigate the training of aircraft maintenance men. Crowder's system was to set multiple choice questions in the text, and provide feedback for each of the alternatives. Examples of this method show that the alternatives offered in questions were chosen to cover mistakes which students were likely to make. Crowder's system, which he called "intrinsic programming", was better known as "branching programming" on account of its multiple-choice alternatives.

Much better known was the other style of programmed learning, as proposed by the behaviourist B.F. Skinner. Skinner made some very effective criticisms of traditional teaching methods. His scheme of programmed instruction was to present the material as part of a "schedule of reinforcement" in typical behaviourist manner. The programmed text of Skinner's theory of behaviorism is the most complete example of his ideas in action. Skinner's system was generally called "linear programming" because its activities were placed in otherwise continuous text. Skinner was a wonderful publicist for his own ideas, as can be seen from this passage:

"There is a simple job to be done. The task can be stated in concrete terms. The necessary techniques are known. The equipment can easily be provided. Nothing stands in the way except cultural inertia... We are on the threshold of an exciting and revolutionary period in which the scientific study of man will be put to work in man's best interests. Education must play its part. It must accept the fact that sweeping revision of educational practice is possible and inevitable...".

Both methods were originally presented in machines, and both were later presented in book form. Both systems were to an extent student centered. They were ways of teaching individual learners who worked at their own pace. Both systems (in different ways) used knowledge of results to promote learning.^{p619} In both systems the content was pre-tested to identify problems and iron them out. Both systems emphasised clear learning objectives. Progress in learning was measured by pre- and post-tests of equivalent difficulty. Many practical tests showed the effectiveness of these methods.

== Later effects ==
Many of these ideas were picked up and used in other educational fields, such as open learning (see the Open University) and computer-assisted learning.

Programmed learning ideas influenced the Children's Television Workshop, which did the R&D for Sesame Street. The use of developmental testing was absolutely characteristic of programmed learning. The division of the individual programs into small chunks is also a feature of programmed learning.

Even more is this true of Blue's Clues. Unlike Sesame Street, which tested a third of its episodes, the Blue's Clues research team field tested every episode three times with children aged between two and six in preschool environments such as Head Start programs, public schools, and private day care centers. There were three phases of testing: content evaluation, video evaluations, and content analysis.^{182} Their tests of the pilot, conducted throughout New York City with over 100 children aged from three to seven,^{21} showed that the attention and comprehension of young viewers increased with each repeat viewing.

== Learning or training? ==
The terms "programmed learning" and "programmed training" were interchangeable, because the principles and methods were almost identical. If the target audience was industrial or military, researchers used the term programmed training, because training budgets supported the work. But in schools and colleges, the work was often described as programmed learning.

Many accounts used either or both terms according to which interest was paying for the work. Sometimes researchers used both terms as explicit alternatives. Some surveys standardised on using just one of the terms.

Perhaps the only distinction was the way the "terminal behaviours" (the final test demonstrating what the learner had learnt) were arrived at. In training, the goals were decided by a process called task analysis, or critical incident technique. This was based on the key activities which a trained person should be able to do. In educational work, deciding on the terminal test was not so securely grounded. One school of thought, probably the majority, decided to turn the rather vague statements of educational aims into full-fledged behavioural statements of the kind "At the end of this program, students should be able to do the following...". A pamphlet by Robert Mager was influential because it showed how to do this. This worked well with some subject matters, but had its limitations. In general, educators have reservations as to how far a list of behaviours captures what they are trying to teach. Subjects differ greatly in their basic aims, but where programmed learning suited a topic, most field trials gave positive results.

== Examples ==
Daily Oral Language and the Saxon method, a math programme, are specific implementations of programmed instruction which have an emphasis on repetition.

Well-known books using programmed learning include the Lisp/Scheme text The Little Schemer, Bobby Fischer Teaches Chess, Engineering Mathematics, by Ken Stroud, and Laplace Transform Solution Of Differential Equations: A Programmed Text, by Robert D. Strum and John R. Ward of the Naval Postgraduate School. Several available foreign language reading textbooks also use programmed learning.

In classical-language education, University of Michigan classicist Waldo Earle Sweet applied programmed instruction to the teaching of Latin in Artes Latinae, a self-paced course developed during the 1960s. The program organized instruction into sequenced frames requiring repeated student responses and immediate reinforcement. During development, Sweet taught successive versions at junior-high and college levels, and versions were field-tested in junior-high classes and by pilot teachers at institutions around the United States. The course was later adapted to computer-based formats.

Recently, the application of programmed instruction principles was applied to training in computer programs.

== See also ==
- Socratic method
