= List of MeSH codes (N04) =

The following is a partial list of the "N" codes for Medical Subject Headings (MeSH), as defined by the United States National Library of Medicine (NLM).

This list continues the information at List of MeSH codes (N03). Codes following these are found at List of MeSH codes (N05). For other MeSH codes, see List of MeSH codes.

The source for this content is the set of 2006 MeSH Trees from the NLM.

== MeSH N04 – health services administration ==
=== MeSH N04.452 – organization and administration ===
- MeSH N04.452.070 – annual reports
- MeSH N04.452.095 – appointments and schedules
- MeSH N04.452.095.738 – waiting lists
- MeSH N04.452.095.758 – shared medical appointments
- MeSH N04.452.115 – Clinical governance
- MeSH N04.452.122 – committee membership
- MeSH N04.452.150 – constitution and bylaws
- MeSH N04.452.190 – organizational decision making
- MeSH N04.452.209 – efficiency
- MeSH N04.452.209.500 – organizational efficiency
- MeSH N04.452.264 – eligibility determination
- MeSH N04.452.289 – facilities and service utilization
- MeSH N04.452.289.500 – emergency room visits
- MeSH N04.452.313 – fee schedules
- MeSH N04.452.313.500 – relative value scales
- MeSH N04.452.394 – governing board
- MeSH N04.452.394.600 – trustees
- MeSH N04.452.442 – hospital facility administration
- MeSH N04.452.442.452 – hospital administration
- MeSH N04.452.442.452.060 – hospital ancillary services
- MeSH N04.452.442.452.110 – centralized hospital services
- MeSH N04.452.442.452.180 – hospital financial management
- MeSH N04.452.442.452.322 – hospital communication systems
- MeSH N04.452.442.452.422 – hospital departments
- MeSH N04.452.442.452.422.040 – hospital admitting department
- MeSH N04.452.442.452.422.070 – hospital anesthesia department
- MeSH N04.452.442.452.422.215 – hospital cardiology service
- MeSH N04.452.442.452.422.260 – hospital central supply
- MeSH N04.452.442.452.422.270 – hospital chaplaincy service
- MeSH N04.452.442.452.422.298 – hospital dental service
- MeSH N04.452.442.452.422.310 – hospital education department
- MeSH N04.452.442.452.422.336 – hospital emergency service
- MeSH N04.452.442.452.422.336.400 – trauma centers
- MeSH N04.452.442.452.422.374 – hospital food service
- MeSH N04.452.442.452.422.412 – hospital housekeeping
- MeSH N04.452.442.452.422.420 – hospital laboratories
- MeSH N04.452.442.452.422.428 – hospital laundry service
- MeSH N04.452.442.452.422.450 – hospital maintenance and engineering
- MeSH N04.452.442.452.422.465 – hospital medical records department
- MeSH N04.452.442.452.422.467 – morgue
- MeSH N04.452.442.452.422.489 – hospital nursing service
- MeSH N04.452.442.452.422.495 – hospital obstetrics and gynecology department
- MeSH N04.452.442.452.422.500 – hospital occupational therapy department
- MeSH N04.452.442.452.422.513 – hospital oncology service
- MeSH N04.452.442.452.422.527 – hospital outpatient clinics
- MeSH N04.452.442.452.422.527.600 – pain clinics
- MeSH N04.452.442.452.422.535 – hospital pathology department
- MeSH N04.452.442.452.422.565 – hospital personnel administration
- MeSH N04.452.442.452.422.603 – hospital pharmacy service
- MeSH N04.452.442.452.422.615 – hospital physical therapy department
- MeSH N04.452.442.452.422.641 – hospital psychiatric department
- MeSH N04.452.442.452.422.679 – hospital purchasing
- MeSH N04.452.442.452.422.679.375 – group purchasing
- MeSH N04.452.442.452.422.695 – hospital radiology department
- MeSH N04.452.442.452.422.712 – hospital respiratory therapy department
- MeSH N04.452.442.452.422.730 – hospital social work department
- MeSH N04.452.442.452.422.750 – hospital surgery department
- MeSH N04.452.442.452.422.790 – hospital urology department
- MeSH N04.452.442.452.450 – hospital distribution systems
- MeSH N04.452.442.452.510 – hospital-patient relations
- MeSH N04.452.442.452.530 – hospital-physician relations
- MeSH N04.452.442.452.530.500 – medical staff privileges
- MeSH N04.452.442.452.550 – hospital restructuring
- MeSH N04.452.442.452.550.380 – hospital-physician joint ventures
- MeSH N04.452.442.452.550.380.500 – physician self-referral
- MeSH N04.452.442.452.565 – hospital shared services
- MeSH N04.452.442.452.585 – hospital shops
- MeSH N04.452.442.452.600 – hospital libraries
- MeSH N04.452.442.452.650 – hospital materials management
- MeSH N04.452.442.452.650.300 – hospital inventories
- MeSH N04.452.442.452.675 – hospital medication systems
- MeSH N04.452.442.452.688 – hospital nuclear medicine department
- MeSH N04.452.442.452.700 – product line management
- MeSH N04.452.460 – institutional management teams
- MeSH N04.452.500 – management audit
- MeSH N04.452.500.150 – benchmarking
- MeSH N04.452.515 – management information systems
- MeSH N04.452.515.080 – clinical laboratory information systems
- MeSH N04.452.515.095 – clinical pharmacy information systems
- MeSH N04.452.515.110 – database management systems
- MeSH N04.452.515.110.500 – dashboard systems
- MeSH N04.452.515.135 – management decision support systems
- MeSH N04.452.515.350 – healthcare common procedure coding system
- MeSH N04.452.515.360 – hospital information systems
- MeSH N04.452.515.360.050 – ambulatory care information systems
- MeSH N04.452.515.360.500 – medical order entry systems
- MeSH N04.452.515.360.555 – operating room information systems
- MeSH N04.452.515.360.652 – point-of-care systems
- MeSH N04.452.515.708 – office automation
- MeSH N04.452.515.708.950 – word processing
- MeSH N04.452.515.800 – personnel staffing and scheduling information systems
- MeSH N04.452.515.825 – radiology information systems
- MeSH N04.452.515.825.500 – teleradiology
- MeSH N04.452.521 – mandatory programs
- MeSH N04.452.525 – workforce
- MeSH N04.452.525.500 – health workforce
- MeSH N04.452.528 – medication systems
- MeSH N04.452.528.460 – medication reconciliation
- MeSH N04.452.528.467 – medication review
- MeSH N04.452.528.473 – hospital medication systems
- MeSH N04.452.523 – military health services
- MeSH N04.452.534 – organizational models
- MeSH N04.452.540 – multi-institutional systems
- MeSH N04.452.540.308 – hospital shared services
- MeSH N04.452.602 – organizational affiliation
- MeSH N04.452.602.713 – transfer agreement
- MeSH N04.452.606 – organizational culture
- MeSH N04.452.610 – organizational innovation
- MeSH N04.452.610.125 – change management
- MeSH N04.452.610.250 – entrepreneurship
- MeSH N04.452.615 – organizational objectives
- MeSH N04.452.633 – ownership
- MeSH N04.452.633.390 – private sector
- MeSH N04.452.633.780 – privatization
- MeSH N04.452.633.890 – public sector
- MeSH N04.452.653 – patient identification systems
- MeSH N04.452.653.250 – health smart cards
- MeSH N04.452.653.500 – radio frequency identification device
- MeSH N04.452.677 – personnel management
- MeSH N04.452.677.356 – collective bargaining
- MeSH N04.452.677.358 – employee discipline
- MeSH N04.452.677.362 – employee grievances
- MeSH N04.452.677.368 – employee incentive plans
- MeSH N04.452.677.370 – employee performance appraisal
- MeSH N04.452.677.400 – job application
- MeSH N04.452.677.410 – job description
- MeSH N04.452.677.415 – leadership
- MeSH N04.452.677.420 – management quality circles
- MeSH N04.452.677.430 – negotiating
- MeSH N04.452.677.440 – hospital personnel administration
- MeSH N04.452.677.445 – personnel delegation
- MeSH N04.452.677.450 – personnel downsizing
- MeSH N04.452.677.460 – personnel loyalty
- MeSH N04.452.677.500 – personnel selection
- MeSH N04.452.677.650 – personnel staffing and scheduling
- MeSH N04.452.677.650.250 – shift work schedule
- MeSH N04.452.677.650.313 – teleworking
- MeSH N04.452.677.650.438 – work-life balance
- MeSH N04.452.677.650.375 – work schedule tolerance
- MeSH N04.452.677.650.500 – workload
- MeSH N04.452.677.680 – personnel turnover
- MeSH N04.452.677.740 – physician incentive plans
- MeSH N04.452.677.800 – salaries and fringe benefits
- MeSH N04.452.677.800.162 – family leave
- MeSH N04.452.677.800.162.500 – parental leave
- MeSH N04.452.677.800.325 – employee health benefit plans
- MeSH N04.452.677.800.325.300 – employee retirement income security act
- MeSH N04.452.677.800.662 – sick leave
- MeSH N04.452.677.822 – staff development
- MeSH N04.452.677.842 – employee strikes
- MeSH N04.452.677.896 – work engagement
- MeSH N04.452.677.896.500 – physician engagement
- MeSH N04.452.677.975 – workplace
- MeSH N04.452.677.975.500 – working conditions
- MeSH N04.452.677.975.500.500 – workforce diversity
- MeSH N04.452.706 – pharmacy administration
- MeSH N04.452.706.310 – drug and narcotic control
- MeSH N04.452.706.310.500 – drug recalls
- MeSH N04.452.706.310.750 – safety based drug withdrawals
- MeSH N04.452.706.477 – drug utilization
- MeSH N04.452.706.477.400 – drug utilization review
- MeSH N04.452.706.477.400.500 – antimicrobial stewardship
- MeSH N04.452.718 – planning techniques
- MeSH N04.452.718.500 – strategic planning
- MeSH N04.452.758 – professional practice
- MeSH N04.452.758.244 – group practice
- MeSH N04.452.758.244.369 – dental group practice
- MeSH N04.452.758.244.400 – prepaid group practice
- MeSH N04.452.758.244.425 – health maintenance organizations
- MeSH N04.452.758.244.450 – independent practice associations
- MeSH N04.452.758.275 – hospital-physician relations
- MeSH N04.452.758.275.500 – medical staff privileges
- MeSH N04.452.758.307 – house calls
- MeSH N04.452.758.367 – institutional practice
- MeSH N04.452.758.372 – management service organizations
- MeSH N04.452.758.377 – nursing
- MeSH N04.452.758.377.500 – private duty nursing
- MeSH N04.452.758.377.750 – supervisory nursing
- MeSH N04.452.758.377.875 – office nursing
- MeSH N04.452.758.377.937 – telenursing
- MeSH N04.452.758.377.968 – travel nursing
- MeSH N04.452.758.388 – nursing faculty practice
- MeSH N04.452.758.635 – office visits
- MeSH N04.452.758.635.500 – no-show patients
- MeSH N04.452.758.671 – partnership practice
- MeSH N04.452.758.671.589 – dental partnership practice
- MeSH N04.452.758.708 – practice management
- MeSH N04.452.758.708.200 – office management
- MeSH N04.452.758.708.200.400 – forms and records control
- MeSH N04.452.758.708.300 – dental practice management
- MeSH N04.452.758.708.450 – medical practice management
- MeSH N04.452.758.708.450.500 – concierge medicine
- MeSH N04.452.758.708.525 – veterinary practice management
- MeSH N04.452.758.708.600 – practice valuation and purchase
- MeSH N04.452.758.745 – private practice
- MeSH N04.452.758.745.225 – fee-for-service plans
- MeSH N04.452.758.745.450 – independent practice associations
- MeSH N04.452.758.752 – professional autonomy
- MeSH N04.452.758.760 – professional corporations
- MeSH N04.452.758.772 – professional practice location
- MeSH N04.452.758.788 – professional staff committees
- MeSH N04.452.758.788.300 – ethics committees
- MeSH N04.452.758.788.300.500 – clinical ethics committees
- MeSH N04.452.758.788.300.750 – research ethics committees
- MeSH N04.452.758.788.682 – pharmacy and therapeutics committee
- MeSH N04.452.758.849 – referral and consultation
- MeSH N04.452.758.849.174 – ethics consultation
- MeSH N04.452.758.849.350 – gatekeeping
- MeSH N04.452.758.849.500 – physician self-referral
- MeSH N04.452.758.849.550 – remote consultation
- MeSH N04.452.758.849.550.500 – distance counseling
- MeSH N04.452.758.849.775 – secondary care
- MeSH N04.452.758.849.887 – tertiary healthcare
- MeSH N04.452.760 – program development
- MeSH N04.452.794 – public health administration
- MeSH N04.452.822 – public relations
- MeSH N04.452.822.070 – anniversaries and special events
- MeSH N04.452.822.210 – community-institutional relations
- MeSH N04.452.822.370 – hospital-patient relations
- MeSH N04.452.822.379 – hospital-physician relations
- MeSH N04.452.822.388 – interdepartmental relations
- MeSH N04.452.822.400 – interinstitutional relations
- MeSH N04.452.822.700 – patient satisfaction
- MeSH N04.452.822.700.500 – patient preference
- MeSH N04.452.859 – records
- MeSH N04.452.859.132 – birth certificates
- MeSH N04.452.859.198 – consent forms
- MeSH N04.452.859.264 – death certificates
- MeSH N04.452.859.341 – dental records
- MeSH N04.452.859.360 – diet records
- MeSH N04.452.859.380 – hospital records
- MeSH N04.452.859.564 – medical records
- MeSH N04.452.859.564.137 – healthcare administrative claims
- MeSH N04.452.859.564.274 – clinical coding
- MeSH N04.452.859.564.550 – medical record linkage
- MeSH N04.452.859.564.600 – problem-oriented medical records
- MeSH N04.452.859.564.650 – computerized medical records systems
- MeSH N04.452.859.564.650.125 – electronic health records
- MeSH N04.452.859.564.650.500 – medical order entry systems
- MeSH N04.452.859.564.725 – patient discharge summaries
- MeSH N04.452.859.564.800 – trauma severity indices
- MeSH N04.452.859.564.800.125 – abbreviated injury scale
- MeSH N04.452.859.564.800.250 – glasgow coma scale
- MeSH N04.452.859.564.800.260 – glasgow outcome scale
- MeSH N04.452.859.564.800.500 – injury severity score
- MeSH N04.452.859.675 – nursing records
- MeSH N04.452.859.819 – registries
- MeSH N04.452.859.819.725 – seer program
- MeSH N04.452.871 – risk management
- MeSH N04.452.871.715 – risk assessment
- MeSH N04.452.871.715.200 – adverse outcome pathways
- MeSH N04.452.871.715.400 – healthcare failure mode and effect analysis
- MeSH N04.452.871.715.800 – risk adjustment
- MeSH N04.452.871.758 – risk evaluation and mitigation
- MeSH N04.452.871.800 – financial risk sharing
- MeSH N04.452.871.900 – safety management
- MeSH N04.452.871.900.500 – material safety data sheet
- MeSH N04.452.910 – security measures
- MeSH N04.452.910.009 – biometric identification
- MeSH N04.452.910.009.250 – automated facial recognition
- MeSH N04.452.910.009.500 – dermatoglypics
- MeSH N04.452.910.009.750 – DNA fingerprinting
- MeSH N04.452.910.150 – biosecurity
- MeSH N04.452.910.200 – computer security
- MeSH N04.452.910.200.250 – blockchain
- MeSH N04.452.910.200.500 – data anonymization
- MeSH N04.452.921 – nursing shared governance
- MeSH N04.452.932 – time management
- MeSH N04.452.955 – total quality management
- MeSH N04.452.524 – veterans health services
- MeSH N04.452.977 – voluntary programs

=== MeSH N04.590 – patient care management ===
- MeSH N04.590.233 – comprehensive health care
- MeSH N04.590.233.250 – comprehensive dental care
- MeSH N04.590.233.508 – nursing process
- MeSH N04.590.233.508.480 – nursing assessment
- MeSH N04.590.233.508.480.110 – nursing diagnosis
- MeSH N04.590.233.508.613 – nursing research
- MeSH N04.590.233.508.613.234 – clinical nursing research
- MeSH N04.590.233.508.613.385 – nursing administration research
- MeSH N04.590.233.508.613.413 – nursing education research
- MeSH N04.590.233.508.613.432 – nursing evaluation research
- MeSH N04.590.233.508.613.634 – nursing methodology research
- MeSH N04.590.233.624 – patient care planning
- MeSH N04.590.233.624.124 – advance care planning
- MeSH N04.590.233.624.124.050 – advance directives
- MeSH N04.590.233.624.124.050.500 – living wills
- MeSH N04.590.233.624.250 – case management
- MeSH N04.590.233.624.625 – critical pathways
- MeSH N04.590.233.727 – primary health care
- MeSH N04.590.233.727.210 – continuity of patient care
- MeSH N04.590.233.727.210.063 – aftercare
- MeSH N04.590.233.727.210.125 – patient discharge
- MeSH N04.590.233.727.210.249 – patient handoff
- MeSH N04.590.233.727.210.624 – patient transfer
- MeSH N04.590.233.727.210.718 – transition to adult care
- MeSH N04.590.233.727.210.812 – transitional care
- MeSH N04.590.233.727.407 – patient-centered care
- MeSH N04.590.233.727.407.250 – narrative medicine
- MeSH N04.590.233.727.407.500 – patient navigation
- MeSH N04.590.233.727.605 – refusal to treat
- MeSH N04.590.233.727.605.500 – conscientious refusal to treat
- MeSH N04.590.233.799 – progressive patient care
- MeSH N04.590.254 – healthcare crew resource management
- MeSH N04.590.374 – delivery of health care
- MeSH N04.590.374.034 – after-hours care
- MeSH N04.590.374.034.500 – answering services
- MeSH N04.590.374.070 – professional delegation
- MeSH N04.590.374.142 – integrated delivery of health care
- MeSH N04.590.374.142.600 – provider-sponsored organizations
- MeSH N04.590.374.285 – health care reform
- MeSH N04.590.374.350 – health services accessibility
- MeSH N04.590.374.410 – managed care programs
- MeSH N04.590.374.410.175 – competitive medical plans
- MeSH N04.590.374.410.400 – health maintenance organizations
- MeSH N04.590.374.410.450 – independent practice associations
- MeSH N04.590.374.410.700 – patient freedom of choice laws
- MeSH N04.590.374.410.750 – preferred provider organizations
- MeSH N04.590.374.410.875 – provider-sponsored organizations
- MeSH N04.590.374.600 – product line management
- MeSH N04.590.374.800 – telemedicine
- MeSH N04.590.374.800.550 – remote consultation
- MeSH N04.590.374.800.600 – telepathology
- MeSH N04.590.374.800.700 – teleradiology
- MeSH N04.590.374.900 – uncompensated care
- MeSH N04.590.607 – disease management
- MeSH N04.590.715 – patient care team
- MeSH N04.590.715.571 – team nursing
- MeSH N04.590.731 – patient selection
- MeSH N04.590.874 – point-of-care systems

=== MeSH N04.761 – quality of health care ===
- MeSH N04.761.316 – advance directive adherence
- MeSH N04.761.210 – clinical competence
- MeSH N04.761.337 – guideline adherence
- MeSH N04.761.559 – outcome and process assessment (health care)
- MeSH N04.761.559.590 – outcome assessment (health care)
- MeSH N04.761.559.590.399 – patient outcome assessment
- MeSH N04.761.559.590.800 – treatment outcome
- MeSH N04.761.559.590.800.760 – treatment failure
- MeSH N04.761.559.590.900 – watchful waiting
- MeSH N04.761.559.650 – process assessment (health care)
- MeSH N04.761.616 – health care peer review
- MeSH N04.761.673 – professional review organizations
- MeSH N04.761.685 – program evaluation
- MeSH N04.761.685.150 – benchmarking
- MeSH N04.761.700 – health care quality assurance
- MeSH N04.761.700.075 – health personnel alert fatigue
- MeSH N04.761.700.150 – benchmarking
- MeSH N04.761.700.250 – clinical audit
- MeSH N04.761.700.250.295 – dental audit
- MeSH N04.761.700.250.500 – medical audit
- MeSH N04.761.700.250.500.100 – commission on professional and hospital activities
- MeSH N04.761.700.250.520 – nursing audit
- MeSH N04.761.700.350 – guidelines
- MeSH N04.761.700.350.324 – codes of ethics
- MeSH N04.761.700.350.650 – practice guidelines
- MeSH N04.761.700.512 – laboratory proficiency testing
- MeSH N04.761.700.594 – healthcare near miss
- MeSH N04.761.700.615 – potentially inappropriate medication list
- MeSH N04.761.700.635 – healthcare timeout
- MeSH N04.761.700.675 – total quality management
- MeSH N04.761.744 – quality improvement
- MeSH N04.761.744.500 – meaningful use
- MeSH N04.761.744.750 – value-based health insurance
- MeSH N04.761.789 – health care quality indicators
- MeSH N04.761.789.800 – risk adjustment
- MeSH N04.761.789.900 – standard of care
- MeSH N04.761.879 – utilization review
- MeSH N04.761.879.200 – concurrent review
- MeSH N04.761.879.300 – drug utilization review

=== MeSH N04.940 – universal healthcare ===
The list continues at List of MeSH codes (N05).
