= List of MeSH codes (N02) =

The following is a partial list of the "N" codes for Medical Subject Headings (MeSH), as defined by the United States National Library of Medicine (NLM).

This list continues the information at List of MeSH codes (N01). Codes following these are found at List of MeSH codes (N03). For other MeSH codes, see List of MeSH codes.

The source for this content is the set of 2006 MeSH Trees from the NLM.

== MeSH N02 – health care facilities, manpower, and services ==
=== MeSH N02.278 – health facilities ===
- MeSH N02.278.020 – academic medical centers
- MeSH N02.278.020.300 – hospitals, teaching
- MeSH N02.278.020.300.310 – hospitals, university
- MeSH N02.278.020.578 – schools, medical
- MeSH N02.278.035 – ambulatory care facilities
- MeSH N02.278.035.128 – community health centers
- MeSH N02.278.035.128.800 – substance abuse treatment centers
- MeSH N02.278.035.158 – community mental health centers
- MeSH N02.278.035.158.300 – child guidance clinics
- MeSH N02.278.035.310 – maternal-child health centers
- MeSH N02.278.035.380 – hospital outpatient clinics
- MeSH N02.278.035.380.600 – pain clinics
- MeSH N02.278.035.516 – pain clinics
- MeSH N02.278.035.652 – surgicenters
- MeSH N02.278.050 – bed occupancy
- MeSH N02.278.065 – biological specimen banks
- MeSH N02.278.065.200 – blood banks
- MeSH N02.278.065.600 – milk banks
- MeSH N02.278.065.700 – sperm banks
- MeSH N02.278.065.900 – tissue banks
- MeSH N02.278.065.900.205 – bone banks
- MeSH N02.278.065.900.400 – eye banks
- MeSH N02.278.080 – birthing centers
- MeSH N02.278.192 – dental facilities
- MeSH N02.278.192.250 – dental clinics
- MeSH N02.278.192.377 – dental offices
- MeSH N02.278.192.631 – dental laboratories
- MeSH N02.278.200 – facility design and construction
- MeSH N02.278.200.100 – building codes
- MeSH N02.278.200.403 – hospital design and construction
- MeSH N02.278.207 – fitness centers
- MeSH N02.278.215 – proprietary health facilities
- MeSH N02.278.215.110 – proprietary hospitals
- MeSH N02.278.218 – health facility closure
- MeSH N02.278.220 – health facility environment
- MeSH N02.278.220.640 – patients' rooms
- MeSH N02.278.235 – health facility merger
- MeSH N02.278.255 – health facility moving
- MeSH N02.278.306 – health facility size
- MeSH N02.278.306.472 – hospital bed capacity
- MeSH N02.278.306.472.080 – under 100 hospital bed capacity
- MeSH N02.278.306.472.120 – 100 to 299 hospital bed capacity
- MeSH N02.278.306.472.180 – 300 to 499 hospital bed capacity
- MeSH N02.278.306.472.300 – 500 and over hospital bed capacity
- MeSH N02.278.354 – hospital administration
- MeSH N02.278.354.060 – hospital ancillary services
- MeSH N02.278.354.110 – centralized hospital services
- MeSH N02.278.354.180 – hospital financial management
- MeSH N02.278.354.322 – hospital communication systems
- MeSH N02.278.354.422 – hospital departments
- MeSH N02.278.354.422.040 – hospital admitting department
- MeSH N02.278.354.422.070 – hospital anesthesia department
- MeSH N02.278.354.422.215 – hospital cardiology service
- MeSH N02.278.354.422.260 – hospital central supply
- MeSH N02.278.354.422.270 – hospital chaplaincy service
- MeSH N02.278.354.422.298 – hospital dental service
- MeSH N02.278.354.422.310 – hospital education department
- MeSH N02.278.354.422.336 – hospital emergency service
- MeSH N02.278.354.422.336.500 – trauma centers
- MeSH N02.278.354.422.374 – hospital food service
- MeSH N02.278.354.422.412 – hospital housekeeping
- MeSH N02.278.354.422.420 – hospital laboratories
- MeSH N02.278.354.422.428 – hospital laundry service
- MeSH N02.278.354.422.450 – hospital maintenance and engineering
- MeSH N02.278.354.422.465 – hospital medical records department
- MeSH N02.278.354.422.472 – hospital nuclear medicine department
- MeSH N02.278.354.422.489 – hospital nursing service
- MeSH N02.278.354.422.495 – hospital obstetrics and gynecology department
- MeSH N02.278.354.422.500 – hospital occupational therapy department
- MeSH N02.278.354.422.513 – hospital oncology service
- MeSH N02.278.354.422.527 – hospital outpatient clinics
- MeSH N02.278.354.422.527.600 – pain clinics
- MeSH N02.278.354.422.535 – hospital pathology department
- MeSH N02.278.354.422.565 – hospital personnel administration
- MeSH N02.278.354.422.603 – hospital pharmacy service
- MeSH N02.278.354.422.615 – hospital physical therapy department
- MeSH N02.278.354.422.641 – hospital psychiatric department
- MeSH N02.278.354.422.679 – hospital purchasing
- MeSH N02.278.354.422.679.375 – group purchasing
- MeSH N02.278.354.422.695 – hospital radiology department
- MeSH N02.278.354.422.712 – hospital respiratory therapy department
- MeSH N02.278.354.422.730 – hospital social work department
- MeSH N02.278.354.422.750 – hospital surgery department
- MeSH N02.278.354.422.790 – hospital urology department
- MeSH N02.278.354.446 – hospital distribution systems
- MeSH N02.278.354.455 – hospital-patient relations
- MeSH N02.278.354.458 – hospital-physician relations
- MeSH N02.278.354.458.500 – medical staff privileges
- MeSH N02.278.354.550 – hospital restructuring
- MeSH N02.278.354.550.380 – hospital-physician joint ventures
- MeSH N02.278.354.550.380.500 – physician self-referral
- MeSH N02.278.354.565 – hospital shared services
- MeSH N02.278.354.580 – hospital shops
- MeSH N02.278.354.600 – hospital libraries
- MeSH N02.278.354.650 – hospital materials management
- MeSH N02.278.354.650.300 – hospital inventories
- MeSH N02.278.354.675 – hospital medication systems
- MeSH N02.278.354.700 – product line management
- MeSH N02.278.388 – hospital units
- MeSH N02.278.388.150 – delivery rooms
- MeSH N02.278.388.200 – hospital hemodialysis units
- MeSH N02.278.388.493 – intensive care units
- MeSH N02.278.388.493.160 – burn units
- MeSH N02.278.388.493.211 – coronary care units
- MeSH N02.278.388.493.390 – pediatric intensive care units
- MeSH N02.278.388.493.390.380 – neonatal intensive care units
- MeSH N02.278.388.493.592 – recovery room
- MeSH N02.278.388.493.696 – respiratory care units
- MeSH N02.278.388.540 – nurseries, hospital
- MeSH N02.278.388.700 – operating rooms
- MeSH N02.278.388.740 – self-care units
- MeSH N02.278.421 – hospitals
- MeSH N02.278.421.306 – community hospitals
- MeSH N02.278.421.389 – general hospitals
- MeSH N02.278.421.395 – group practice hospitals
- MeSH N02.278.421.473 – packaged hospitals
- MeSH N02.278.421.481 – private hospitals
- MeSH N02.278.421.481.500 – proprietary hospitals
- MeSH N02.278.421.481.600 – religious hospitals
- MeSH N02.278.421.481.800 – voluntary hospitals
- MeSH N02.278.421.510 – public hospitals
- MeSH N02.278.421.510.100 – county hospitals
- MeSH N02.278.421.510.140 – district hospitals
- MeSH N02.278.421.510.180 – federal hospitals
- MeSH N02.278.421.510.180.250 – military hospitals
- MeSH N02.278.421.510.180.400 – veterans hospitals
- MeSH N02.278.421.510.210 – municipal hospitals
- MeSH N02.278.421.510.300 – state hospitals
- MeSH N02.278.421.518 – rural hospitals
- MeSH N02.278.421.530 – satellite hospitals
- MeSH N02.278.421.556 – special hospitals
- MeSH N02.278.421.556.070 – cancer care facilities
- MeSH N02.278.421.556.110 – cardiac care facilities
- MeSH N02.278.421.556.185 – hospices
- MeSH N02.278.421.556.200 – chronic disease hospitals
- MeSH N02.278.421.556.294 – convalescent hospitals
- MeSH N02.278.421.556.366 – maternity hospitals
- MeSH N02.278.421.556.386 – hospitals, osteopathic
- MeSH N02.278.421.556.437 – hospitals, pediatric
- MeSH N02.278.421.556.508 – hospitals, psychiatric
- MeSH N02.278.421.556.868 – surgicenters
- MeSH N02.278.421.639 – teaching hospitals
- MeSH N02.278.421.639.725 – university hospitals
- MeSH N02.278.421.660 – urban hospitals
- MeSH N02.278.421.660.400 – municipal hospitals
- MeSH N02.278.487 – laboratories
- MeSH N02.278.487.410 – hospital laboratories
- MeSH N02.278.524 – leper colonies
- MeSH N02.278.562 – medical office buildings
- MeSH N02.278.617 – nurseries
- MeSH N02.278.617.473 – nurseries, hospital
- MeSH N02.278.678 – pharmacies
- MeSH N02.278.692 – physicians' offices
- MeSH N02.278.726 – poison control centers
- MeSH N02.278.808 – rehabilitation centers
- MeSH N02.278.808.860 – sheltered workshops
- MeSH N02.278.808.930 – substance abuse treatment centers
- MeSH N02.278.825 – residential facilities
- MeSH N02.278.825.187 – assisted living facilities
- MeSH N02.278.825.375 – group homes
- MeSH N02.278.825.408 – halfway houses
- MeSH N02.278.825.462 – homes for the aged
- MeSH N02.278.825.610 – nursing homes
- MeSH N02.278.825.610.480 – intermediate care facilities
- MeSH N02.278.825.610.770 – skilled nursing facilities
- MeSH N02.278.825.700 – orphanages

=== MeSH N02.360 – health personnel ===
- MeSH N02.360.067 – allied health personnel
- MeSH N02.360.067.040 – animal technicians
- MeSH N02.360.067.080 – community health aides
- MeSH N02.360.067.105 – dental auxiliaries
- MeSH N02.360.067.105.250 – dental assistants
- MeSH N02.360.067.105.376 – dental hygienists
- MeSH N02.360.067.105.503 – dental technicians
- MeSH N02.360.067.105.503.300 – denturists
- MeSH N02.360.067.150 – emergency medical technicians
- MeSH N02.360.067.350 – home health aides
- MeSH N02.360.067.550 – medical record administrators
- MeSH N02.360.067.600 – medical secretaries
- MeSH N02.360.067.600.630 – medical receptionists
- MeSH N02.360.067.652 – nurses' aides
- MeSH N02.360.067.652.628 – psychiatric aides
- MeSH N02.360.067.700 – operating room technicians
- MeSH N02.360.067.730 – pharmacists' aides
- MeSH N02.360.067.740 – physician assistants
- MeSH N02.360.067.740.690 – ophthalmic assistants
- MeSH N02.360.067.740.750 – pediatric assistants
- MeSH N02.360.200 – caregivers
- MeSH N02.360.230 – coroners and medical examiners
- MeSH N02.360.290 – dental staff
- MeSH N02.360.290.490 – dental staff, hospital
- MeSH N02.360.330 – dentists
- MeSH N02.360.330.310 – women dentists
- MeSH N02.360.360 – faculty, dental
- MeSH N02.360.375 – faculty, medical
- MeSH N02.360.390 – faculty, nursing
- MeSH N02.360.430 – health facility administrators
- MeSH N02.360.430.490 – hospital administrators
- MeSH N02.360.430.490.100 – hospital chief executive officers
- MeSH N02.360.490 – infection control practitioners
- MeSH N02.360.510 – laboratory personnel
- MeSH N02.360.630 – medical staff
- MeSH N02.360.630.490 – hospital medical staff
- MeSH N02.360.630.490.400 – hospitalists
- MeSH N02.360.650 – nurses
- MeSH N02.360.650.580 – nurse administrators
- MeSH N02.360.650.600 – nurse anesthetists
- MeSH N02.360.650.610 – nurse clinicians
- MeSH N02.360.650.620 – nurse midwives
- MeSH N02.360.650.640 – nurse practitioners
- MeSH N02.360.650.670 – nurses, male
- MeSH N02.360.680 – nursing staff
- MeSH N02.360.680.490 – nursing staff, hospital
- MeSH N02.360.740 – personnel, hospital
- MeSH N02.360.740.322 – dental staff, hospital
- MeSH N02.360.740.380 – hospital administrators
- MeSH N02.360.740.380.100 – chief executive officers, hospital
- MeSH N02.360.740.400 – hospital volunteers
- MeSH N02.360.740.400.375 – hospital auxiliaries
- MeSH N02.360.740.400.650 – patient escort service
- MeSH N02.360.740.422 – hospital medical staff
- MeSH N02.360.740.422.400 – hospitalists
- MeSH N02.360.740.523 – hospital nursing staff
- MeSH N02.360.780 – pharmacists
- MeSH N02.360.800 – physician executives
- MeSH N02.360.810 – physicians
- MeSH N02.360.810.390 – foreign medical graduates
- MeSH N02.360.810.580 – hospitalists
- MeSH N02.360.810.770 – physicians, family
- MeSH N02.360.810.820 – women physicians
- MeSH N02.360.905 – veterinarians

=== MeSH N02.370 – health promotion ===
- MeSH N02.370.300 – Healthy People programs

=== MeSH N02.421 – health services ===
- MeSH N02.421.044 – adolescent health services
- MeSH N02.421.088 – child care
- MeSH N02.421.088.120 – infant care
- MeSH N02.421.088.120.120 – neonatal intensive care
- MeSH N02.421.088.120.180 – perinatal care
- MeSH N02.421.088.120.240 – rooming-in care
- MeSH N02.421.143 – community health services
- MeSH N02.421.143.130 – child health services
- MeSH N02.421.143.130.320 – early intervention (education)
- MeSH N02.421.143.150 – community health nursing
- MeSH N02.421.143.183 – community mental health services
- MeSH N02.421.143.202 – community networks
- MeSH N02.421.143.221 – community pharmacy services
- MeSH N02.421.143.262 – consumer participation
- MeSH N02.421.143.262.300 – patient participation
- MeSH N02.421.143.303 – counseling
- MeSH N02.421.143.303.700 – sex counseling
- MeSH N02.421.143.401 – family planning services
- MeSH N02.421.143.452 – foster home care
- MeSH N02.421.143.524 – home care services
- MeSH N02.421.143.524.337 – home hemodialysis
- MeSH N02.421.143.524.403 – hospital-based home care services
- MeSH N02.421.143.524.436 – home infusion therapy
- MeSH N02.421.143.524.470 – home nursing
- MeSH N02.421.143.524.470.610 – respite care
- MeSH N02.421.143.524.595 – homemaker services
- MeSH N02.421.143.524.650 – home parenteral nutrition
- MeSH N02.421.143.524.650.565 – home total parenteral nutrition
- MeSH N02.421.143.550 – hospices
- MeSH N02.421.143.620 – maternal health services
- MeSH N02.421.143.620.534 – postnatal care
- MeSH N02.421.143.620.620 – preconception care
- MeSH N02.421.143.620.704 – prenatal care
- MeSH N02.421.143.740 – occupational health services
- MeSH N02.421.143.827 – preventive health services
- MeSH N02.421.143.827.233 – diagnostic services
- MeSH N02.421.143.827.233.443 – mass screening
- MeSH N02.421.143.827.233.443.062 – anonymous testing
- MeSH N02.421.143.827.233.443.125 – genetic screening
- MeSH N02.421.143.827.233.443.443 – mass chest x-ray
- MeSH N02.421.143.827.233.443.633 – multiphasic screening
- MeSH N02.421.143.827.233.443.816 – neonatal screening
- MeSH N02.421.143.827.233.628 – mobile health units
- MeSH N02.421.143.827.320 – early intervention (education)
- MeSH N02.421.143.827.407 – health education
- MeSH N02.421.143.827.407.457 – dental health education
- MeSH N02.421.143.827.407.478 – health fairs
- MeSH N02.421.143.827.407.680 – patient education
- MeSH N02.421.143.827.608 – immunization programs
- MeSH N02.421.143.827.608.500 – mass immunization
- MeSH N02.421.143.827.708 – needle-exchange programs
- MeSH N02.421.143.827.809 – School Health Services
- MeSH N02.421.143.827.809.576 – school dentistry
- MeSH N02.421.143.827.809.742 – school nursing
- MeSH N02.421.240 – dental health services
- MeSH N02.421.240.190 – dental care
- MeSH N02.421.240.190.210 – dental care for aged
- MeSH N02.421.240.190.215 – dental care for children
- MeSH N02.421.240.190.220 – dental care for chronically ill
- MeSH N02.421.240.190.230 – dental care for disabled
- MeSH N02.421.240.200 – hospital dental service
- MeSH N02.421.242 – dietary services
- MeSH N02.421.242.472 – hospital food service
- MeSH N02.421.242.472.310 – menu planning
- MeSH N02.421.297 – emergency medical services
- MeSH N02.421.297.058 – emergency medical service communication systems
- MeSH N02.421.297.195 – hospital emergency service
- MeSH N02.421.297.195.480 – trauma centers
- MeSH N02.421.297.200 – psychiatric emergency services
- MeSH N02.421.297.695 – poison control centers
- MeSH N02.421.297.879 – transportation of patients
- MeSH N02.421.297.879.100 – ambulances
- MeSH N02.421.297.879.100.100 – air ambulances
- MeSH N02.421.297.900 – triage
- MeSH N02.421.308 – genetic services
- MeSH N02.421.308.400 – genetic counseling
- MeSH N02.421.308.430 – genetic screening
- MeSH N02.421.320 – health services for the aged
- MeSH N02.421.330 – indigenous health services
- MeSH N02.421.380 – health services misuse
- MeSH N02.421.380.900 – unnecessary procedures
- MeSH N02.421.450 – medical errors
- MeSH N02.421.450.280 – diagnostic errors
- MeSH N02.421.450.500 – medication errors
- MeSH N02.421.450.600 – observer variation
- MeSH N02.421.461 – mental health services
- MeSH N02.421.461.232 – community mental health services
- MeSH N02.421.461.363 – counseling
- MeSH N02.421.461.363.349 – directive counseling
- MeSH N02.421.461.363.700 – sex counseling
- MeSH N02.421.461.798 – psychiatric social work
- MeSH N02.421.533 – nursing care
- MeSH N02.421.533.200 – emergency nursing
- MeSH N02.421.533.245 – geriatric nursing
- MeSH N02.421.533.282 – holistic nursing
- MeSH N02.421.533.320 – home nursing
- MeSH N02.421.533.320.610 – respite care
- MeSH N02.421.533.460 – maternal-child nursing
- MeSH N02.421.533.460.600 – neonatal nursing
- MeSH N02.421.533.520 – practical nursing
- MeSH N02.421.533.571 – obstetrical nursing
- MeSH N02.421.533.585 – occupational health nursing
- MeSH N02.421.533.600 – oncologic nursing
- MeSH N02.421.533.635 – orthopedic nursing
- MeSH N02.421.533.691 – pediatric nursing
- MeSH N02.421.533.691.600 – neonatal nursing
- MeSH N02.421.533.710 – perioperative nursing
- MeSH N02.421.533.710.625 – operating room nursing
- MeSH N02.421.533.710.650 – postanesthesia nursing
- MeSH N02.421.533.760 – primary nursing care
- MeSH N02.421.533.778 – psychiatric nursing
- MeSH N02.421.533.889 – rehabilitation nursing
- MeSH N02.421.539 – nursing services
- MeSH N02.421.539.089 – home care services
- MeSH N02.421.539.180 – hospital nursing service
- MeSH N02.421.585 – patient care
- MeSH N02.421.585.058 – aftercare
- MeSH N02.421.585.106 – ambulatory care
- MeSH N02.421.585.106.500 – continuous ambulatory peritoneal dialysis
- MeSH N02.421.585.190 – critical care
- MeSH N02.421.585.190.400 – intensive care
- MeSH N02.421.585.190.400.405 – neonatal intensive care
- MeSH N02.421.585.215 – custodial care
- MeSH N02.421.585.246 – day care
- MeSH N02.421.585.300 – episode of care
- MeSH N02.421.585.352 – foster home care
- MeSH N02.421.585.400 – hospitalization
- MeSH N02.421.585.400.480 – length of stay
- MeSH N02.421.585.400.600 – patient admission
- MeSH N02.421.585.400.610 – patient discharge
- MeSH N02.421.585.400.620 – patient readmission
- MeSH N02.421.585.400.630 – patient transfer
- MeSH N02.421.585.415 – institutionalization
- MeSH N02.421.585.415.280 – deinstitutionalization
- MeSH N02.421.585.440 – life support care
- MeSH N02.421.585.476 – long-term care
- MeSH N02.421.585.564 – night care
- MeSH N02.421.585.611 – nursing care
- MeSH N02.421.585.611.470 – home nursing
- MeSH N02.421.585.611.470.610 – respite care
- MeSH N02.421.585.666 – palliative care
- MeSH N02.421.585.703 – perinatal care
- MeSH N02.421.585.722 – perioperative care
- MeSH N02.421.585.722.400 – intraoperative care
- MeSH N02.421.585.722.500 – perioperative nursing
- MeSH N02.421.585.722.700 – postoperative care
- MeSH N02.421.585.741 – postnatal care
- MeSH N02.421.585.775 – preconception care
- MeSH N02.421.585.786 – prenatal care
- MeSH N02.421.585.795 – preoperative care
- MeSH N02.421.585.850 – subacute care
- MeSH N02.421.585.905 – terminal care
- MeSH N02.421.585.905.199 – euthanasia
- MeSH N02.421.585.905.199.500 – active euthanasia
- MeSH N02.421.585.905.199.500.200 – euthanasia, active, voluntary
- MeSH N02.421.585.905.199.500.750 – animal euthanasia
- MeSH N02.421.585.905.199.625 – passive euthanasia
- MeSH N02.421.585.905.400 – hospice care
- MeSH N02.421.585.905.700 – resuscitation orders
- MeSH N02.421.585.905.850 – assisted suicide
- MeSH N02.421.585.952 – withholding treatment
- MeSH N02.421.585.952.500 – passive euthanasia
- MeSH N02.421.631 – personal health services
- MeSH N02.421.668 – pharmaceutical services
- MeSH N02.421.668.274 – community pharmacy services
- MeSH N02.421.668.320 – drug information services
- MeSH N02.421.668.320.120 – adverse drug reaction reporting systems
- MeSH N02.421.668.320.200 – clinical pharmacy information systems
- MeSH N02.421.668.556 – hospital pharmacy service
- MeSH N02.421.726 – preventive health services
- MeSH N02.421.726.233 – diagnostic services
- MeSH N02.421.726.233.443 – mass screening
- MeSH N02.421.726.233.443.221 – anonymous testing
- MeSH N02.421.726.233.443.443 – mass chest x-ray
- MeSH N02.421.726.233.443.633 – multiphasic screening
- MeSH N02.421.726.233.628 – mobile health units
- MeSH N02.421.726.320 – early intervention (education)
- MeSH N02.421.726.407 – health education
- MeSH N02.421.726.407.457 – dental health education
- MeSH N02.421.726.407.478 – health fairs
- MeSH N02.421.726.407.680 – patient education
- MeSH N02.421.726.507 – health promotion
- MeSH N02.421.726.507.300 – Healthy People programs
- MeSH N02.421.726.608 – immunization programs
- MeSH N02.421.726.608.500 – mass immunization
- MeSH N02.421.726.708 – needle-exchange programs
- MeSH N02.421.726.758 – primary prevention
- MeSH N02.421.726.758.310 – immunization
- MeSH N02.421.726.758.310.444 – mass immunization
- MeSH N02.421.726.758.310.890 – vaccination
- MeSH N02.421.726.809 – school health services
- MeSH N02.421.726.809.576 – school dentistry
- MeSH N02.421.726.809.742 – school nursing
- MeSH N02.421.784 – physical rehabilitation
- MeSH N02.421.784.110 – activities of daily living
- MeSH N02.421.784.644 – vocational rehabilitation
- MeSH N02.421.784.644.350 – supported employment
- MeSH N02.421.784.680 – self care
- MeSH N02.421.800 – reproductive health services
- MeSH N02.421.800.249 – family planning services
- MeSH N02.421.800.500 – maternal health services
- MeSH N02.421.816 – rural health services
- MeSH N02.421.849 – social work
- MeSH N02.421.849.673 – psychiatric social work
- MeSH N02.421.897 – student health services
- MeSH N02.421.908 – suburban health services
- MeSH N02.421.911 – tissue and organ procurement
- MeSH N02.421.911.200 – directed tissue donation
- MeSH N02.421.911.600 – donor selection
- MeSH N02.421.914 – urban health services
- MeSH N02.421.920 – women's health services
- MeSH N02.421.920.660 – preconception care

=== MeSH N02.508 – housekeeping ===
- MeSH N02.508.472 – hospital housekeeping

=== MeSH N02.628 – maintenance ===
- MeSH N02.628.472 – hospital maintenance and engineering

=== MeSH N02.720 – missions and missionaries ===
The list continues at List of MeSH codes (N03).
