= List of MeSH codes (N05) =

The following is a partial list of the "N" codes for Medical Subject Headings (MeSH), as defined by the United States National Library of Medicine (NLM).

This list continues the information at List of MeSH codes (N04). Codes following these are found at List of MeSH codes (V01). For other MeSH codes, see List of MeSH codes.

The source for this content is the set of 2006 MeSH Trees from the NLM.

== MeSH N05 – health care quality, access, and evaluation ==
=== MeSH N05.300 – delivery of health care ===
- MeSH N05.300.049 – after-hours care
- MeSH N05.300.049.500 – answering services
- MeSH N05.300.100 – attitude of health personnel
- MeSH N05.300.100.337 – nurse's role
- MeSH N05.300.100.675 – refusal to treat
- MeSH N05.300.125 – attitude to death
- MeSH N05.300.150 – attitude to health
- MeSH N05.300.150.395 – health services misuse
- MeSH N05.300.150.395.900 – unnecessary procedures
- MeSH N05.300.150.410 – health knowledge, attitudes, practice
- MeSH N05.300.150.600 – patient acceptance of health care
- MeSH N05.300.150.600.600 – patient compliance
- MeSH N05.300.150.600.620 – patient participation
- MeSH N05.300.150.600.630 – patient satisfaction
- MeSH N05.300.150.600.800 – treatment refusal
- MeSH N05.300.262 – integrated delivery of health care
- MeSH N05.300.262.600 – provider-sponsored organizations
- MeSH N05.300.300 – dentist's practice patterns
- MeSH N05.300.375 – health care costs
- MeSH N05.300.375.250 – direct service costs
- MeSH N05.300.375.300 – drug costs
- MeSH N05.300.375.350 – employer health costs
- MeSH N05.300.375.500 – hospital costs
- MeSH N05.300.380 – health care reform
- MeSH N05.300.385 – health expenditures
- MeSH N05.300.400 – health priorities
- MeSH N05.300.420 – health resources
- MeSH N05.300.420.400 – health manpower
- MeSH N05.300.430 – health services accessibility
- MeSH N05.300.430.375 – health care rationing
- MeSH N05.300.430.390 – health facility closure
- MeSH N05.300.430.400 – health facility environment
- MeSH N05.300.430.410 – health facility size
- MeSH N05.300.430.500 – marketing of health services
- MeSH N05.300.430.500.500 – social marketing
- MeSH N05.300.450 – health services needs and demand
- MeSH N05.300.450.520 – medically underserved area
- MeSH N05.300.537 – needs assessment
- MeSH N05.300.625 – physician's practice patterns
- MeSH N05.300.660 – professional-patient relations
- MeSH N05.300.660.325 – dentist-patient relations
- MeSH N05.300.660.560 – nurse-patient relations
- MeSH N05.300.660.625 – physician-patient relations
- MeSH N05.300.830 – uncompensated care

=== MeSH N05.350 – ethics ===
- MeSH N05.350.200 – bioethics
- MeSH N05.350.200.500 – clinical ethics
- MeSH N05.350.225 – conflict of interest
- MeSH N05.350.225.500 – physician self-referral
- MeSH N05.350.250 – ethical review
- MeSH N05.350.250.200 – ethics consultation
- MeSH N05.350.262 – ethicists
- MeSH N05.350.268 – ethics committees
- MeSH N05.350.268.500 – clinical ethics committees
- MeSH N05.350.268.750 – ethics committees, research
- MeSH N05.350.325 – institutional ethics
- MeSH N05.350.340 – professional ethics
- MeSH N05.350.340.080 – codes of ethics
- MeSH N05.350.340.080.249 – helsinki declaration
- MeSH N05.350.340.080.400 – hippocratic oath
- MeSH N05.350.340.162 – clinical ethics
- MeSH N05.350.340.325 – dental ethics
- MeSH N05.350.340.500 – medical ethics
- MeSH N05.350.340.500.425 – hippocratic oath
- MeSH N05.350.340.550 – nursing ethics
- MeSH N05.350.340.625 – pharmacy ethics
- MeSH N05.350.670 – research ethics

=== MeSH N05.425 – health services research ===
- MeSH N05.425.210 – health care surveys

=== MeSH N05.700 – quality assurance, health care ===
- MeSH N05.700.150 – benchmarking
- MeSH N05.700.200 – credentialing
- MeSH N05.700.200.100 – accreditation
- MeSH N05.700.200.100.420 – Joint Commission on Accreditation of Healthcare Organizations
- MeSH N05.700.200.190 – certification
- MeSH N05.700.200.190.750 – specialty boards
- MeSH N05.700.200.450 – licensure
- MeSH N05.700.200.450.300 – dental licensure
- MeSH N05.700.200.450.380 – hospital licensure
- MeSH N05.700.200.450.500 – medical licensure
- MeSH N05.700.200.450.550 – nursing licensure
- MeSH N05.700.200.450.625 – pharmacy licensure
- MeSH N05.700.250 – dental audit
- MeSH N05.700.300 – facility regulation and control
- MeSH N05.700.350 – guidelines
- MeSH N05.700.350.324 – codes of ethics
- MeSH N05.700.350.650 – practice guidelines
- MeSH N05.700.500 – medical audit
- MeSH N05.700.500.200 – Commission on Professional and Hospital Activities
- MeSH N05.700.520 – nursing audit
- MeSH N05.700.675 – professional review organizations
- MeSH N05.700.685 – professional staff committees
- MeSH N05.700.685.149 – clinical trials data monitoring committees
- MeSH N05.700.685.300 – ethics committees
- MeSH N05.700.685.300.500 – clinical ethics committees
- MeSH N05.700.685.300.750 – research ethics committees
- MeSH N05.700.685.625 – pharmacy and therapeutics committee
- MeSH N05.700.792 – total quality management
- MeSH N05.700.900 – utilization review
- MeSH N05.700.900.200 – concurrent review
- MeSH N05.700.900.300 – drug utilization review

=== MeSH N05.715 – quality of health care ===
- MeSH N05.715.350 – epidemiologic factors
- MeSH N05.715.350.075 – age factors
- MeSH N05.715.350.075.100 – age of onset
- MeSH N05.715.350.075.550 – maternal age
- MeSH N05.715.350.150 – bias (epidemiology)
- MeSH N05.715.350.150.675 – observer variation
- MeSH N05.715.350.150.775 – selection bias
- MeSH N05.715.350.200 – causality
- MeSH N05.715.350.200.650 – precipitating factors
- MeSH N05.715.350.200.700 – risk factors
- MeSH N05.715.350.225 – comorbidity
- MeSH N05.715.350.240 – confounding factors (epidemiology)
- MeSH N05.715.350.350 – effect modifiers (epidemiology)
- MeSH N05.715.350.350.225 – cohort effect
- MeSH N05.715.350.350.375 – healthy worker effect
- MeSH N05.715.350.350.625 – placebo effect
- MeSH N05.715.350.575 – reproductive history
- MeSH N05.715.350.675 – sex factors
- MeSH N05.715.360 – health care evaluation mechanisms
- MeSH N05.715.360.300 – data collection
- MeSH N05.715.360.300.360 – geriatric assessment
- MeSH N05.715.360.300.375 – health surveys
- MeSH N05.715.360.300.375.149 – behavioral risk factor surveillance system
- MeSH N05.715.360.300.375.300 – dental health surveys
- MeSH N05.715.360.300.375.300.325 – dental plaque index
- MeSH N05.715.360.300.375.300.340 – dmf index
- MeSH N05.715.360.300.375.300.670 – oral hygiene index
- MeSH N05.715.360.300.375.300.690 – periodontal index
- MeSH N05.715.360.300.375.375 – health status indicators
- MeSH N05.715.360.300.375.375.730 – sickness impact profile
- MeSH N05.715.360.300.375.500 – mass screening
- MeSH N05.715.360.300.375.500.174 – anonymous testing
- MeSH N05.715.360.300.375.500.350 – genetic screening
- MeSH N05.715.360.300.375.500.500 – mass chest x-ray
- MeSH N05.715.360.300.375.500.540 – multiphasic screening
- MeSH N05.715.360.300.375.500.575 – neonatal screening
- MeSH N05.715.360.300.375.500.825 – vision screening
- MeSH N05.715.360.300.375.560 – nutrition surveys
- MeSH N05.715.360.300.375.560.300 – diet surveys
- MeSH N05.715.360.300.375.625 – population surveillance
- MeSH N05.715.360.300.375.625.650 – sentinel surveillance
- MeSH N05.715.360.300.387 – health care surveys
- MeSH N05.715.360.300.400 – interviews
- MeSH N05.715.360.300.400.350 – focus groups
- MeSH N05.715.360.300.480 – narration
- MeSH N05.715.360.300.560 – nutrition assessment
- MeSH N05.715.360.300.560.565 – nutrition surveys
- MeSH N05.715.360.300.560.565.300 – diet surveys
- MeSH N05.715.360.300.695 – questionnaires
- MeSH N05.715.360.300.715 – records
- MeSH N05.715.360.300.715.175 – birth certificates
- MeSH N05.715.360.300.715.245 – consent forms
- MeSH N05.715.360.300.715.315 – death certificates
- MeSH N05.715.360.300.715.330 – dental records
- MeSH N05.715.360.300.715.380 – hospital records
- MeSH N05.715.360.300.715.500 – medical records
- MeSH N05.715.360.300.715.500.500 – medical record linkage
- MeSH N05.715.360.300.715.500.520 – problem-oriented medical records
- MeSH N05.715.360.300.715.500.530 – computerized medical records systems
- MeSH N05.715.360.300.715.500.800 – trauma severity indices
- MeSH N05.715.360.300.715.500.800.100 – abbreviated injury scale
- MeSH N05.715.360.300.715.500.800.325 – glasgow coma scale
- MeSH N05.715.360.300.715.500.800.335 – glasgow outcome scale
- MeSH N05.715.360.300.715.500.800.400 – injury severity score
- MeSH N05.715.360.300.715.550 – nursing records
- MeSH N05.715.360.300.715.700 – registries
- MeSH N05.715.360.300.715.700.725 – seer program
- MeSH N05.715.360.317 – advance directive adherence
- MeSH N05.715.360.335 – evaluation studies
- MeSH N05.715.360.395 – guideline adherence
- MeSH N05.715.360.455 – organizational case studies
- MeSH N05.715.360.575 – outcome and process assessment (health care)
- MeSH N05.715.360.575.575 – outcome assessment (health care)
- MeSH N05.715.360.575.575.800 – treatment outcome
- MeSH N05.715.360.575.575.800.760 – treatment failure
- MeSH N05.715.360.575.625 – process assessment (health care)
- MeSH N05.715.360.600 – patient satisfaction
- MeSH N05.715.360.650 – program evaluation
- MeSH N05.715.360.650.150 – benchmarking
- MeSH N05.715.360.750 – statistics
- MeSH N05.715.360.750.100 – actuarial analysis
- MeSH N05.715.360.750.125 – analysis of variance
- MeSH N05.715.360.750.125.500 – multivariate analysis
- MeSH N05.715.360.750.200 – cluster analysis
- MeSH N05.715.360.750.200.750 – small-area analysis
- MeSH N05.715.360.750.200.775 – space-time clustering
- MeSH N05.715.360.750.220 – confidence intervals
- MeSH N05.715.360.750.300 – statistical data interpretation
- MeSH N05.715.360.750.325 – discriminant analysis
- MeSH N05.715.360.750.350 – statistical factor analysis
- MeSH N05.715.360.750.500 – matched-pair analysis
- MeSH N05.715.360.750.530 – statistical models
- MeSH N05.715.360.750.530.450 – likelihood functions
- MeSH N05.715.360.750.530.460 – linear models
- MeSH N05.715.360.750.530.480 – logistic models
- MeSH N05.715.360.750.530.500 – economic models
- MeSH N05.715.360.750.530.500.500 – econometric models
- MeSH N05.715.360.750.530.530 – nomograms
- MeSH N05.715.360.750.530.650 – proportional hazards models
- MeSH N05.715.360.750.540 – monte carlo method
- MeSH N05.715.360.750.625 – probability
- MeSH N05.715.360.750.625.150 – Bayes' theorem
- MeSH N05.715.360.750.625.450 – likelihood functions
- MeSH N05.715.360.750.625.500 – markov chains
- MeSH N05.715.360.750.625.590 – odds ratio
- MeSH N05.715.360.750.625.650 – proportional hazards models
- MeSH N05.715.360.750.625.700 – risk
- MeSH N05.715.360.750.625.700.450 – logistic models
- MeSH N05.715.360.750.625.700.690 – risk assessment
- MeSH N05.715.360.750.625.700.690.800 – risk adjustment
- MeSH N05.715.360.750.625.700.700 – risk factors
- MeSH N05.715.360.750.625.850 – uncertainty
- MeSH N05.715.360.750.695 – regression analysis
- MeSH N05.715.360.750.695.440 – least-squares analysis
- MeSH N05.715.360.750.695.460 – linear models
- MeSH N05.715.360.750.695.470 – logistic models
- MeSH N05.715.360.750.695.650 – proportional hazards models
- MeSH N05.715.360.750.725 – sensitivity and specificity
- MeSH N05.715.360.750.750 – statistical distributions
- MeSH N05.715.360.750.750.150 – binomial distribution
- MeSH N05.715.360.750.750.200 – chi-square distribution
- MeSH N05.715.360.750.750.565 – normal distribution
- MeSH N05.715.360.750.750.620 – poisson distribution
- MeSH N05.715.360.750.760 – nonparametric statistics
- MeSH N05.715.360.750.770 – stochastic processes
- MeSH N05.715.360.750.770.500 – markov chains
- MeSH N05.715.360.750.795 – survival analysis
- MeSH N05.715.360.750.795.300 – disease-free survival
- MeSH N05.715.360.775 – epidemiologic study characteristics
- MeSH N05.715.360.775.175 – epidemiologic studies
- MeSH N05.715.360.775.175.200 – case-control studies
- MeSH N05.715.360.775.175.200.710 – retrospective studies
- MeSH N05.715.360.775.175.250 – cohort studies
- MeSH N05.715.360.775.175.250.350 – follow-up studies
- MeSH N05.715.360.775.175.250.450 – longitudinal studies
- MeSH N05.715.360.775.175.250.630 – prospective studies
- MeSH N05.715.360.775.175.275 – cross-sectional studies
- MeSH N05.715.360.775.175.800 – seroepidemiologic studies
- MeSH N05.715.360.775.175.800.375 – hiv seroprevalence
- MeSH N05.715.360.775.225 – clinical protocols
- MeSH N05.715.360.775.225.500 – antineoplastic protocols
- MeSH N05.715.360.775.235 – clinical trials
- MeSH N05.715.360.775.235.200 – phase i clinical trials
- MeSH N05.715.360.775.235.210 – phase ii clinical trials
- MeSH N05.715.360.775.235.220 – phase iii clinical trials
- MeSH N05.715.360.775.235.230 – phase iv clinical trials
- MeSH N05.715.360.775.235.387 – controlled clinical trials
- MeSH N05.715.360.775.235.387.500 – randomized controlled trials
- MeSH N05.715.360.775.235.545 – multicenter studies
- MeSH N05.715.360.775.350 – feasibility studies
- MeSH N05.715.360.775.390 – intervention studies
- MeSH N05.715.360.775.625 – pilot projects
- MeSH N05.715.360.775.700 – sampling studies
- MeSH N05.715.360.775.750 – twin studies
- MeSH N05.715.360.780 – epidemiologic research design
- MeSH N05.715.360.780.150 – cross-over studies
- MeSH N05.715.360.780.320 – double-blind method
- MeSH N05.715.360.780.500 – matched-pair analysis
- MeSH N05.715.360.780.515 – meta-analysis
- MeSH N05.715.360.780.675 – random allocation
- MeSH N05.715.360.780.685 – reproducibility of results
- MeSH N05.715.360.780.692 – sample size
- MeSH N05.715.360.780.700 – sensitivity and specificity
- MeSH N05.715.360.780.700.640 – predictive value of tests
- MeSH N05.715.360.780.700.680 – roc curve
- MeSH N05.715.360.780.730 – single-blind method
- MeSH N05.715.360.825 – biomedical technology assessment
- MeSH N05.715.680 – health care peer review

The list continues at List of MeSH codes (V01).
