= Health policy and management =

Health policy and management is the field relating to leadership, management, and administration of public health systems, health care systems, hospitals, and hospital networks. Health care administrators are considered health care professionals.

== Terminology ==
Health policy and management or health systems management or health care systems management describes the leadership and general management of hospitals, hospital networks, and/or health care systems. In international use, the term refers to management at all levels. In the United States, management of a single institution (e.g. a hospital) is also referred to as "medical and health services management", "healthcare management" or "health administration".

Health systems management ensures that specific outcomes are attained, that departments within a health facility are running smoothly, that the right people are in the right jobs, that people know what is expected of them, that resources are used efficiently and that all departments are working towards a common goal.

== Applying social determinants of health in health policy and management ==
Social determinants (i.e. location, housing, education, employment, income, crime, social cohesion) have been shown to significantly influence health. However, at present, population health receives only five percent of national health budgets. By comparison, 95 percent is spent on direct medical care services, yet medical care only accounts for only 10-15 percent of preventable mortality in the United States. Genetics, social circumstances, environmental exposures, and behavioral patterns comprise the bulk of health determinants of health outcomes, which is increasingly considered when creating health policy.

At the federal level, policymakers are addressing social determinants through provisions in the Affordable Care Act, in which non-profit hospitals must conduct community health needs assessments and participate in community improvement projects. The creation of public-private partnerships by hospitals has occurred in many states, and has specifically addressed social determinants of health like education and housing.

Federal, state, and local governments can improve population health by evaluating all proposed social and economic policies for potential health impacts. Future efforts within health policy can incorporate appropriate incentives and tactical funding for community-based initiatives that target known gaps in social determinants. Needs assessments may be conducted in order to identify the most potentially effective mechanisms for each given community. Such assessments may identify a demand for increased and reliable forms of transportation, which would allow individuals to have continuous resources to preventative and acute care. As well, funding for job training initiatives within communities with low employment would allow individuals to build their capacity to not only earn income, but also engage in health-seeking behaviors which typically are at an elevated cost.

== Variations in medical practice and quality of care ==
Unwarranted variations in medical practice refer to the differences in care that cannot be explained by the illness/medical need or by patient preferences. The term “unwarranted variations” was first coined by Dr. John Wennberg when he observed small area (geographic) and practice style variations, which were not based on clinical rationale. The existence of unwarranted variations suggests that some individuals do not receive adequate care or that health resources are not being used appropriately.

The main factors driving these variations are not limited to; increasingly complex healthcare technology, exponentially increasing medical knowledge and over reliance on subjective judgement. Unwarranted variations have measurable consequences in terms of over/under utilization, increased mortality, and increased costs. For example, a 2013 study found that in terms of Medicare costs, higher expenditures were not associated with better outcomes or higher quality of care.

Medical practice variations are an important dimension of health policy and management - understanding the causes and effects of variations will guide policymakers to develop and improve upon existing policies. In managing practice variations, it is important to perform assessments of the diseases/procedures with high levels of unwarranted variations; a comparison between the care delivered and the standard care guidelines will highlight discrepancies and provide insight into improvement areas.

Policymakers should take a comprehensive approach to align policies, leadership, and technology in order to effectively reduce unwarranted variations in care. Effective reduction requires active patient involvement and physician engagement though standardization of clinical care with a focus on adherence to care guidelines and an emphasis on quality based outcomes.

== Medical industrial complex ==
The medical–industrial complex is the network of corporations which supply health care services and products for a profit. The term was derived from the language that President Eisenhower had used ("military-industrial complex") when warning the nation, as he was retiring, about the growing influence of arms manufacturers over American political and economic policies. Then the term "medical industrial complex" started to spread from 1980 through the New England Journal of Medicine (Nov. 4, 1971, 285:1095) by Arnold S. Relman who served as an editor of the journal from 1977 to 1991. According to Dr. Relman, American health care system is a profit-driven industry and it has become a widely accepted theory these days. Since the term was introduced 40 years ago, health care industry has developed into even a larger, greater and flourishing industry. Medical industrial complex includes proprietary hospitals and nursing homes, diagnostic laboratories, home care and emergency room services, renal hemodialysis units, and a wide variety of other medical services that had formerly been provided largely by public or private not-for-profit community-based institutions or by private physicians in their offices.

In countries where the medical industrial complex is too influential, there are legal limitations to consumer options for accessing diverse healthcare services due to regulations in international markets such as the General Agreement on Trade in Services. In the U.S., there are loose regulations on healthcare industries, often driving companies to charge high prices and fragment standards of care. For instance, pharmaceutical companies can charge high prices for drugs, as we have recently seen with EpiPen. Furthermore, since manufacturers of medical devices fund medical education programs such as continuing medical education and physicians and hospitals directly to adopt the use of their devices, there is a controversy that such education has a bias to promote the interests of its funders. The recent development of the telehealth industry could be a possible solution to the fragmentation of care, however, there are currently no government regulations for telehealth companies. Clearly, the government must impose stronger regulations that focus on patient well-being.

== Rationing and access to care ==
Access to care and Rationing are important dimensions of Health Policy and Management (HPAM) because they address the market force that impacts how and when people get health care services. Rationing in health care occurs due to scarcity; everyone cannot have access to every service and treatment because it would not be an efficient use of resources. Some argue that price should not be the biggest factor in determining who has access to which services and treatments, but rather that healthcare is a right that we should all have access to.

Preventative care is an important component of HPAM because the levels of preventative care measures taken by individuals can help to determine the health of the population. The ACA opened the door for increased access to preventative care by mandating insurers to offer these services at no additional cost. If all Americans practice the appropriate level of preventative care, “100,000 lives would be saved each year.” Even with the expanded access to preventative care services and other healthcare related services, the insured still experience rationing due to increasing premiums and rising healthcare costs.

From 2005 to 2015, the average annual employer-sponsored health insurance premiums for family coverage increased 61%. During this time, worker contribution increased even higher by 83%. The growth in employer-sponsored premiums as well as deductibles has led individuals and families to ration health care. High premiums and deductibles encourage individuals and families to think twice before they use health services and lessens the ability for individuals to consume other goods and services.

In Canada citizens have a universal healthcare system which grants them access to healthcare but requires them to deal with rationing issues. The system works through level of importance, with urgent care having priority as well as certain disease/disorder treatment as some are life and death situations. Although Great Britain was the first to boast a universal healthcare system it also suffers from rationing issues. Although the no cost sharing system seems generous on the surface, the overall lack of access or options creates serious issues for patients.

Imagine a world without health care rationing is impractical due to a finite amount of resources. Prior to contrary belief, universal healthcare isn’t the answer to solve rationing, in fact, rationing may increase if more people have access to healthcare without an equivalent increase in the number of physicians. Workspaces also contribute to fostering rationing amongst their employees due to high deductibles and premiums. They key in expanding access without having a negative effect on health care is to begin to look at rationing as a way to share these finite resources across the population, and not a way to reallocate care to certain people. When we do this, we can work to improve access to care and effectively treat as many patients as possible.

== Mental health ==
As a field, health policy and management seeks to improve access, reduce costs, and improve outcomes for individuals with mental health conditions.

=== History ===
The history of mental health care services in the U.S. can best be understood as a gradual shift from institutionalized provision of care to interventions focused in a community setting. World War II resulted in heightened awareness of mental illness as thousands of soldiers returned home traumatized from the war. During that time, development of psychotropic medications also offered new treatment options. In 1963, John F. Kennedy implemented the Community Health Act, ending 109 years of federal non-involvement in mental health services, spurring the deinstitutionalization of individuals with mental illness. The effects of deinstitutionalization were mixed; individuals with mental illness were no longer subject to poor conditions in asylums, however, community support was inadequate to provide treatment and services for the severe and chronically ill.

=== Delivery of services and current policy ===
Mental health is treated by an array of providers representing multiple disciplines working in both public and private settings. The psychiatric and behavioral health sector consist of behavioral health professionals, such as psychiatrists. The primary care sector consists of health care professionals such as internists and family practitioners. This sector is often the initial point of contact for patients. The human services sector consists of social service agencies and criminal justice/prison-based services, among others. The final sector is the volunteer support network sector, consisting of services like self-help groups.

Recent legislation continues to improve access to care by requiring cost parity. The 2008 Health Parity and Addiction Equity Act required certain plans to provide mental illness coverage on par with general health coverage, requiring providers to provide care at similar out-of-pocket costs and with similar benefits for both types of care. The Affordable Care Act of 2010 (ACA) expanded this development by requiring parity for additional plans, expanding parity protections to an additional 62 million people. Both acts significantly reduced cost as a barrier to care, but there are still areas for progress.

This legislation has been successful in improving mental health treatment rates across the entire population. However, there are still large disparities in these rates amongst whites and non-whites. This may be because states that opted out of Medicaid expansion under the ACA had much larger populations of adult people of color.

=== Opportunities for improvement ===
An ongoing and future trend in mental health care is care integration. Recently, care integration has been a key policy priority, and numerous federal agencies have adopted initiatives to promote the integration of primary care and mental health services.
