= List of MeSH codes (N03) =

The following is a partial list of the "N" codes for Medical Subject Headings (MeSH), as defined by the United States National Library of Medicine (NLM).

This list continues the information at List of MeSH codes (N02). Codes following these are found at List of MeSH codes (N04). For other MeSH codes, see List of MeSH codes.

The source for this content is the set of 2006 MeSH Trees from the NLM.

== MeSH N03 – health care economics and organizations ==
=== MeSH N03.219 – economics ===
- MeSH N03.219.075 – compensation and redress
- MeSH N03.219.151 – costs and cost analysis
- MeSH N03.219.151.080 – cost allocation
- MeSH N03.219.151.125 – cost-benefit analysis
- MeSH N03.219.151.160 – cost control
- MeSH N03.219.151.160.200 – cost savings
- MeSH N03.219.151.165 – cost of illness
- MeSH N03.219.151.170 – cost sharing
- MeSH N03.219.151.170.300 – deductibles and coinsurance
- MeSH N03.219.151.170.650 – medical savings accounts
- MeSH N03.219.151.400 – health care costs
- MeSH N03.219.151.400.325 – direct service costs
- MeSH N03.219.151.400.350 – drug costs
- MeSH N03.219.151.400.375 – employer health costs
- MeSH N03.219.151.400.687 – hospital costs
- MeSH N03.219.151.450 – health expenditures
- MeSH N03.219.151.450.200 – capital expenditures
- MeSH N03.219.188 – economic competition
- MeSH N03.219.224 – dental economics
- MeSH N03.219.224.426 – dental fees
- MeSH N03.219.262 – hospital economics
- MeSH N03.219.262.300 – hospital charges
- MeSH N03.219.262.500 – hospital costs
- MeSH N03.219.300 – medical economics
- MeSH N03.219.300.426 – medical fees
- MeSH N03.219.338 – nursing economics
- MeSH N03.219.390 – pharmaceutical economics
- MeSH N03.219.442 – fees and charges
- MeSH N03.219.442.090 – capitation fee
- MeSH N03.219.442.195 – fee-for-service plans
- MeSH N03.219.442.301 – dental fees
- MeSH N03.219.442.426 – medical fees
- MeSH N03.219.442.551 – pharmaceutical fees
- MeSH N03.219.442.551.621 – prescription fees
- MeSH N03.219.442.613 – hospital charges
- MeSH N03.219.442.675 – prescription fees
- MeSH N03.219.442.800 – rate setting and review
- MeSH N03.219.463 – financial management
- MeSH N03.219.463.030 – accounting
- MeSH N03.219.463.030.080 – accounts payable and receivable
- MeSH N03.219.463.030.120 – depreciation
- MeSH N03.219.463.030.160 – financial audit
- MeSH N03.219.463.030.320 – patient credit and collection
- MeSH N03.219.463.045 – bankruptcy
- MeSH N03.219.463.060 – budgets
- MeSH N03.219.463.060.800 – rate setting and review
- MeSH N03.219.463.085 – capital financing
- MeSH N03.219.463.100 – contract services
- MeSH N03.219.463.100.110 – competitive bidding
- MeSH N03.219.463.100.600 – outsourced services
- MeSH N03.219.463.280 – hospital financial management
- MeSH N03.219.463.300 – construction financing
- MeSH N03.219.463.360 – fund raising
- MeSH N03.219.463.430 – group purchasing
- MeSH N03.219.463.500 – property leasing
- MeSH N03.219.463.548 – marketing of health services
- MeSH N03.219.463.800 – risk management
- MeSH N03.219.463.800.800 – financial risk sharing
- MeSH N03.219.483 – financial support
- MeSH N03.219.483.311 – foundations
- MeSH N03.219.483.408 – health planning support
- MeSH N03.219.483.645 – research support
- MeSH N03.219.483.838 – training support
- MeSH N03.219.483.838.276 – fellowships and scholarships
- MeSH N03.219.521 – organized financing
- MeSH N03.219.521.346 – government financing
- MeSH N03.219.521.346.506 – public assistance
- MeSH N03.219.521.346.506.564 – medical assistance
- MeSH N03.219.521.346.506.564.655 – medicaid
- MeSH N03.219.521.346.506.564.663 – Medicare
- MeSH N03.219.521.346.506.564.663.500 – medicare part a
- MeSH N03.219.521.346.506.564.663.515 – medicare part b
- MeSH N03.219.521.346.506.564.663.757 – medicare part c
- MeSH N03.219.521.346.506.678 – old age assistance
- MeSH N03.219.521.346.506.849 – social security
- MeSH N03.219.521.346.506.849.095 – aid to families with dependent children
- MeSH N03.219.521.346.733 – veterans disability claims
- MeSH N03.219.521.346.866 – workers' compensation
- MeSH N03.219.521.576 – insurance
- MeSH N03.219.521.576.090 – cost sharing
- MeSH N03.219.521.576.090.300 – deductibles and coinsurance
- MeSH N03.219.521.576.090.650 – medical savings accounts
- MeSH N03.219.521.576.130 – insurance benefits
- MeSH N03.219.521.576.160 – insurance carriers
- MeSH N03.219.521.576.210 – insurance claim reporting
- MeSH N03.219.521.576.215 – insurance claim review
- MeSH N03.219.521.576.265 – insurance coverage
- MeSH N03.219.521.576.265.500 – universal coverage
- MeSH N03.219.521.576.300 – disability insurance
- MeSH N03.219.521.576.300.900 – workers' compensation
- MeSH N03.219.521.576.343 – Health Insurance
- MeSH N03.219.521.576.343.290 – employee health benefit plans
- MeSH N03.219.521.576.343.290.300 – employee retirement income security act
- MeSH N03.219.521.576.343.349 – Health Insurance Portability and Accountability Act
- MeSH N03.219.521.576.343.409 – accident insurance
- MeSH N03.219.521.576.343.450 – dental insurance
- MeSH N03.219.521.576.343.480 – insurance, health, reimbursement
- MeSH N03.219.521.576.343.492 – hospitalization insurance
- MeSH N03.219.521.576.343.492.231 – Blue Cross
- MeSH N03.219.521.576.343.508 – long-term care insurance
- MeSH N03.219.521.576.343.533 – major medical insurance
- MeSH N03.219.521.576.343.539 – medigap insurance
- MeSH N03.219.521.576.343.545 – nursing services insurance
- MeSH N03.219.521.576.343.575 – pharmaceutical services insurance
- MeSH N03.219.521.576.343.616 – physician services insurance
- MeSH N03.219.521.576.343.616.315 – blue shield
- MeSH N03.219.521.576.343.616.508 – medicare assignment
- MeSH N03.219.521.576.343.658 – psychiatric insurance
- MeSH N03.219.521.576.343.700 – surgical insurance
- MeSH N03.219.521.576.343.800 – managed care programs
- MeSH N03.219.521.576.343.800.175 – competitive medical plans
- MeSH N03.219.521.576.343.800.400 – health maintenance organizations
- MeSH N03.219.521.576.343.800.450 – independent practice associations
- MeSH N03.219.521.576.343.800.700 – patient freedom of choice laws
- MeSH N03.219.521.576.343.800.750 – preferred provider organizations
- MeSH N03.219.521.576.343.800.875 – provider-sponsored organizations
- MeSH N03.219.521.576.343.820 – managed competition
- MeSH N03.219.521.576.343.830 – medical savings accounts
- MeSH N03.219.521.576.343.840 – Medicare
- MeSH N03.219.521.576.343.840.508 – medicare assignment
- MeSH N03.219.521.576.343.840.725 – medicare part a
- MeSH N03.219.521.576.343.840.754 – medicare part b
- MeSH N03.219.521.576.343.840.877 – medicare part c
- MeSH N03.219.521.576.343.900 – united states national health insurance
- MeSH N03.219.521.576.343.925 – prepaid health plans
- MeSH N03.219.521.576.343.925.400 – health maintenance organizations
- MeSH N03.219.521.576.343.962 – single-payer system
- MeSH N03.219.521.576.443 – liability insurance
- MeSH N03.219.521.576.543 – life insurance
- MeSH N03.219.521.576.570 – insurance pools
- MeSH N03.219.521.576.585 – insurance selection bias
- MeSH N03.219.521.576.823 – social security
- MeSH N03.219.521.710 – insurance, health, reimbursement
- MeSH N03.219.521.710.305 – reimbursement mechanisms
- MeSH N03.219.521.710.305.090 – fee-for-service plans
- MeSH N03.219.521.710.305.090.100 – Blue Cross
- MeSH N03.219.521.710.305.090.150 – blue shield
- MeSH N03.219.521.710.305.180 – physician payment review commission
- MeSH N03.219.521.710.305.200 – prospective payment system
- MeSH N03.219.521.710.305.200.080 – diagnosis-related groups
- MeSH N03.219.521.710.305.200.080.550 – drg outliers
- MeSH N03.219.521.710.305.200.500 – Medicare Payment Advisory Commission
- MeSH N03.219.521.710.305.200.605 – prospective payment assessment commission
- MeSH N03.219.521.710.305.290 – disproportionate share reimbursement
- MeSH N03.219.521.710.305.380 – incentive reimbursement
- MeSH N03.219.521.710.305.500 – relative value scales
- MeSH N03.219.521.855 – single-payer system
- MeSH N03.219.559 – personal financing
- MeSH N03.219.559.500 – medical savings accounts
- MeSH N03.219.650 – health care sector
- MeSH N03.219.680 – economic inflation
- MeSH N03.219.702 – investments
- MeSH N03.219.780 – medical indigency
- MeSH N03.219.900 – taxes
- MeSH N03.219.900.250 – income tax
- MeSH N03.219.900.880 – Tax Equity and Fiscal Responsibility Act
- MeSH N03.219.900.940 – tax exemption

=== MeSH N03.349 – health planning ===
- MeSH N03.349.270 – health care rationing
- MeSH N03.349.285 – health care reform
- MeSH N03.349.300 – health plan implementation
- MeSH N03.349.315 – health planning guidelines
- MeSH N03.349.325 – health planning technical assistance
- MeSH N03.349.330 – health priorities
- MeSH N03.349.340 – health resources
- MeSH N03.349.380 – health services research
- MeSH N03.349.380.210 – health care surveys
- MeSH N03.349.380.420 – health services needs and demand
- MeSH N03.349.380.565 – needs assessment
- MeSH N03.349.380.710 – organizational case studies
- MeSH N03.349.550 – national health programs
- MeSH N03.349.550.610 – united states national health insurance
- MeSH N03.349.550.805 – single-payer system
- MeSH N03.349.650 – regional health planning
- MeSH N03.349.650.095 – catchment area (health)
- MeSH N03.349.650.120 – certificate of need
- MeSH N03.349.650.185 – community health planning
- MeSH N03.349.650.250 – health facility planning
- MeSH N03.349.650.250.080 – bed conversion
- MeSH N03.349.650.250.200 – hospital planning
- MeSH N03.349.650.270 – health systems plans
- MeSH N03.349.650.340 – medically underserved area
- MeSH N03.349.650.400 – regional medical programs
- MeSH N03.349.650.480 – state health plans

=== MeSH N03.540 – organizations ===
- MeSH N03.540.052 – academies and institutes
- MeSH N03.540.199 – congresses
- MeSH N03.540.199.205 – consensus development conferences
- MeSH N03.540.199.205.500 – nih consensus development conferences
- MeSH N03.540.245 – consumer organizations
- MeSH N03.540.245.360 – consumer participation
- MeSH N03.540.245.360.300 – patient participation
- MeSH N03.540.427 – government agencies
- MeSH N03.540.427.125 – united states department of agriculture
- MeSH N03.540.427.250 – united states department of veterans affairs
- MeSH N03.540.427.300 – United States Department of Health and Human Services
- MeSH N03.540.427.300.310 – united states Centers for Medicare and Medicaid Services
- MeSH N03.540.427.300.650 – United States Public Health Service
- MeSH N03.540.427.300.650.225 – Centers for Disease Control and Prevention
- MeSH N03.540.427.300.650.225.520 – national institute for occupational safety and health
- MeSH N03.540.427.300.650.400 – national center for health care technology
- MeSH N03.540.427.300.650.425 – national center for health statistics (u.s.)
- MeSH N03.540.427.300.650.450 – National Institutes of Health
- MeSH N03.540.427.300.650.450.450 – national institute of mental health (u.s.)
- MeSH N03.540.427.300.650.450.475 – national library of medicine (u.s.)
- MeSH N03.540.427.300.650.700 – united states Agency for Healthcare Research and Quality
- MeSH N03.540.427.300.650.760 – united states Food and Drug Administration
- MeSH N03.540.427.300.650.790 – united states Health Resources and Services Administration
- MeSH N03.540.427.300.650.790.525 – national health planning information center
- MeSH N03.540.427.300.650.825 – United States Indian health service
- MeSH N03.540.427.300.650.912 – united states office of research integrity
- MeSH N03.540.427.300.650.920 – united states substance abuse and mental health services administration
- MeSH N03.540.427.340 – united states environmental protection agency
- MeSH N03.540.427.380 – united states federal trade commission
- MeSH N03.540.427.405 – united states government agencies
- MeSH N03.540.427.430 – united states national aeronautics and space administration
- MeSH N03.540.427.480 – united states occupational safety and health administration
- MeSH N03.540.427.500 – united states office of economic opportunity
- MeSH N03.540.427.550 – united states office of technology assessment
- MeSH N03.540.427.775 – united states Social Security Administration
- MeSH N03.540.452 – health planning organizations
- MeSH N03.540.452.188 – health care coalitions
- MeSH N03.540.452.210 – health planning councils
- MeSH N03.540.452.508 – state health planning and development agencies
- MeSH N03.540.452.508.440 – health systems agencies
- MeSH N03.540.483 – home care agencies
- MeSH N03.540.514 – international agencies
- MeSH N03.540.514.642 – red cross
- MeSH N03.540.514.718 – United Nations
- MeSH N03.540.514.718.800 – World Health Organization
- MeSH N03.540.514.718.800.628 – Pan American Health Organization
- MeSH N03.540.571 – labor unions
- MeSH N03.540.571.356 – collective bargaining
- MeSH N03.540.571.608 – employee strikes
- MeSH N03.540.608 – national academy of sciences (u.s.)
- MeSH N03.540.608.500 – institute of medicine (u.s.)
- MeSH N03.540.630 – nonprofit organizations
- MeSH N03.540.630.180 – foundations
- MeSH N03.540.630.780 – voluntary health agencies
- MeSH N03.540.630.780.080 – american cancer society
- MeSH N03.540.630.780.110 – American Heart Association
- MeSH N03.540.630.780.500 – mental health associations
- MeSH N03.540.630.780.608 – red cross
- MeSH N03.540.630.780.850 – tuberculosis societies
- MeSH N03.540.782 – self-help groups
- MeSH N03.540.782.270 – Alcoholics Anonymous
- MeSH N03.540.828 – societies
- MeSH N03.540.828.052 – american public health association
- MeSH N03.540.828.105 – American Speech–Language–Hearing Association
- MeSH N03.540.828.506 – dental societies
- MeSH N03.540.828.506.274 – American Dental Association
- MeSH N03.540.828.540 – hospital societies
- MeSH N03.540.828.540.080 – American Hospital Association
- MeSH N03.540.828.589 – medical societies
- MeSH N03.540.828.589.274 – American Medical Association
- MeSH N03.540.828.672 – nursing societies
- MeSH N03.540.828.672.274 – American Nurses' Association
- MeSH N03.540.828.672.463 – International Council of Nurses
- MeSH N03.540.828.755 – pharmaceutical societies
- MeSH N03.540.828.838 – scientific societies

=== MeSH N03.706 – formal social control ===
- MeSH N03.706.110 – credentialing
- MeSH N03.706.110.070 – accreditation
- MeSH N03.706.110.070.410 – Joint Commission on Accreditation of Healthcare Organizations
- MeSH N03.706.110.120 – certification
- MeSH N03.706.110.120.580 – specialty boards
- MeSH N03.706.110.510 – licensure
- MeSH N03.706.110.510.180 – dental licensure
- MeSH N03.706.110.510.290 – hospital licensure
- MeSH N03.706.110.510.410 – medical licensure
- MeSH N03.706.110.510.490 – nursing licensure
- MeSH N03.706.110.510.560 – pharmacy licensure
- MeSH N03.706.280 – facility regulation and control
- MeSH N03.706.358 – government regulation
- MeSH N03.706.437 – human rights
- MeSH N03.706.437.300 – child advocacy
- MeSH N03.706.437.352 – civil rights
- MeSH N03.706.437.352.500 – privacy
- MeSH N03.706.437.352.500.320 – genetic privacy
- MeSH N03.706.437.368 – consumer advocacy
- MeSH N03.706.437.380 – freedom
- MeSH N03.706.437.380.500 – personal autonomy
- MeSH N03.706.437.650 – patient rights
- MeSH N03.706.437.650.124 – confidentiality
- MeSH N03.706.437.650.124.320 – genetic privacy
- MeSH N03.706.437.650.312 – informed consent
- MeSH N03.706.437.650.406 – patient access to records
- MeSH N03.706.437.650.750 – right to die
- MeSH N03.706.437.650.875 – treatment refusal
- MeSH N03.706.437.675 – reproductive rights
- MeSH N03.706.437.700 – social justice
- MeSH N03.706.437.850 – women's rights
- MeSH N03.706.535 – jurisprudence
- MeSH N03.706.535.020 – advance directives
- MeSH N03.706.535.020.500 – living wills
- MeSH N03.706.535.125 – compensation and redress
- MeSH N03.706.535.230 – confidentiality
- MeSH N03.706.535.230.270 – duty to warn
- MeSH N03.706.535.230.320 – genetic privacy
- MeSH N03.706.535.241 – contracts
- MeSH N03.706.535.247 – duty to recontact
- MeSH N03.706.535.253 – expert testimony
- MeSH N03.706.535.351 – forensic psychiatry
- MeSH N03.706.535.351.200 – commitment of mentally ill
- MeSH N03.706.535.351.528 – insanity defense
- MeSH N03.706.535.489 – informed consent
- MeSH N03.706.535.489.134 – consent forms
- MeSH N03.706.535.489.635 – third-party consent
- MeSH N03.706.535.489.635.500 – parental consent
- MeSH N03.706.535.518 – intellectual property
- MeSH N03.706.535.518.300 – copyright
- MeSH N03.706.535.518.650 – patents
- MeSH N03.706.535.547 – legal liability
- MeSH N03.706.535.606 – malpractice
- MeSH N03.706.535.606.300 – defensive medicine
- MeSH N03.706.535.606.528 – professional impairment
- MeSH N03.706.535.606.528.500 – physician impairment
- MeSH N03.706.535.615 – mandatory reporting
- MeSH N03.706.535.625 – mental competency
- MeSH N03.706.535.664 – presumed consent
- MeSH N03.706.535.704 – resuscitation orders
- MeSH N03.706.535.803 – wrongful life
- MeSH N03.706.615 – legislation
- MeSH N03.706.615.100 – antitrust laws
- MeSH N03.706.615.331 – dental legislation
- MeSH N03.706.615.402 – drug legislation
- MeSH N03.706.615.402.250 – drug and narcotic control
- MeSH N03.706.615.412 – food legislation
- MeSH N03.706.615.420 – hospital legislation
- MeSH N03.706.615.420.500 – Patient Self-Determination Act
- MeSH N03.706.615.473 – medical legislation
- MeSH N03.706.615.544 – nursing legislation
- MeSH N03.706.615.615 – pharmacy legislation
- MeSH N03.706.615.686 – veterinary legislation
- MeSH N03.706.615.700 – patient freedom of choice laws
- MeSH N03.706.615.917 – threshold limit values
- MeSH N03.706.657 – mandatory programs
- MeSH N03.706.657.249 – mandatory reporting
- MeSH N03.706.657.500 – mandatory testing
- MeSH N03.706.678 – patient advocacy
- MeSH N03.706.700 – peer review
- MeSH N03.706.700.690 – health care peer review
- MeSH N03.706.700.700 – research peer review
- MeSH N03.706.742 – policy making
- MeSH N03.706.742.500 – advisory committees
- MeSH N03.706.825 – social control policies
- MeSH N03.706.825.550 – organizational policy
- MeSH N03.706.825.608 – public policy
- MeSH N03.706.825.608.214 – family planning policy
- MeSH N03.706.825.608.428 – health policy
- MeSH N03.706.825.608.428.285 – health care reform
- MeSH N03.706.825.608.428.650 – nutrition policy

=== MeSH N03.880 – biomedical technology assessment ===
- MeSH N03.880.502 – high-cost technology

The list continues at List of MeSH codes (N04).
