= Stark Law =

U.S. law restricting physician self-referrals

Stark Law is a set of United States federal laws that prohibit physician self-referral, specifically a referral by a physician of a Medicare or Medicaid patient to an entity for the provision of designated health services ("DHS") if the physician (or an immediate family member) has a financial relationship with that entity.

The term "referral" means "the request by a physician for the item or service" for Medicare Part B services and "the request or establishment of a plan of care by a physician which includes the provision of the designated health service" for all other services. DHS includes "clinical laboratory services"; "physical therapy services"; "occupational therapy services"; "radiology services, including magnetic resonance imaging, computerized axial tomography scans, and ultrasound services"; "radiation therapy services and supplies"; "durable medical equipment and supplies"; "parenteral and enteral nutrients, equipment, and supplies"; "prosthetics, orthotics, and prosthetic devices and supplies"; "home health services"; "outpatient prescription drugs"; "inpatient and outpatient hospital services"; and "outpatient speech-language pathology services." A "financial relationship" includes ownership, investment interest, and compensation arrangements.

The Stark Law contains several exceptions, including physician services, in-office ancillary services, ownership in publicly traded securities and mutual funds, rental of office space and equipment, and bona fide employment relationship. It is named for United States Congressman Pete Stark (D-CA) who sponsored the initial bill.

== History ==
In 1988, Stark introduced an "Ethics in Patient Referrals" bill concerning physician self-referrals. Some of the ideas in the bill became law as part of the Omnibus Budget Reconciliation Act of 1990. In specific, what is referred to as "Stark I" prohibited a physician referring a Medicare patient to a clinical laboratory if the physician or his/her family member has a financial interest in that laboratory. It was codified in the United States Code, Title 42, Section 1395nn (42 U.S.C. 1395nn, "Limitation on certain physician referrals").

The Omnibus Budget Reconciliation Act of 1993 contained what is known as "Stark II" amendments to the original law. "Stark II" extended the "Stark I" provisions to Medicaid patients and to DHS other than clinical laboratory services.

The Centers for Medicare and Medicaid Services has issued rules in the Federal Register to implement Stark Law, including a 2001 "Phase I" final rule, a 2004 "Phase II" interim final rule, and a 2007 "Phase III" final rule.

== Penalties ==
Penalties for violations of Stark Law include: denial of payment for the DHS provided; refund of monies received by physicians and facilities for amounts collected; payment of civil penalties of up to $15,000 for each service that a person "knows or should know" was provided in violation of the law, and three times the amount of improper payment the entity received from the Medicare program; exclusion from the Medicare program and/or state healthcare programs including Medicaid; and payment of civil penalties for attempting to circumvent the law of up to $100,000 for each circumvention scheme.

== Physician self-referral ==
Physician self-referral is the practice of a physician referring a patient to a medical facility in which the physician has a financial interest, be it ownership, investment, or a structured compensation arrangement. Critics argue that this practice is an inherent conflict of interest, because the physician benefits from the physician's own referral. They suggest that such arrangements may encourage overutilization of services, in turn driving up health care costs. In addition, they believe that it would create a captive referral system, which limits competition by other providers.

Those who defend the practice contend that these problems are not widespread. They argue that physicians who own, invest in, or operate medical facilities are responding to a need for medical services which would otherwise not be met, particularly in medically under-served areas. In addition, it is often the case that physician owned entities present a lower-cost alternative to the facilities that are located at hospitals. This is due mostly to higher overhead costs that hospitals must pass down to their services.

== Enforcement ==
Multiple federal entities oversee enforcement of Stark Law. These include the Department of Justice, CMS, and the Department of Health and Human Services. In recent years, enforcement of Stark Law has become increasingly aggressive, largely as a result of the Patient Protection and Affordable Care Act and its amendments to the False Claims Act.

2014 saw some of the largest Stark Law violation settlements to date. On June 9, 2015, the Office of Inspector General issued a fraud alert targeting physician compensation arrangements with hospitals and health systems.

Fines and settlements total in the billions of dollars.

== Risk abatement ==
A safe harbor exists for contracts between physicians and hospitals if the contract meets these seven conditions:

1. the duration is at least a year;
2. it is in writing and signed by both parties;
3. it specifies aggregate payment which is set in advance;
4. payment is reasonable and fair market value;
5. payment does not relate to volume or value of business;
6. the exact services to be performed are outlined; and
7. the contract is commercially reasonable.

Because current processes for monitoring contract compliance and logging physician work hours are often done on paper, the majority of Stark Law violation settlements are the result of technical violations.

Healthcare experts agree that information technology is necessary to streamline hospital processes, including those relating to compliance and Stark Law. Certain electronic health record companies help healthcare systems collect, organize, and store data. Multiple technology solutions exist that specifically automate physician time logging and eliminates Stark Law violation risk.

== Reform proposal ==
The Stark law may impede certain pay for performance value-based arrangements, which led to discussions around reform as of 2019.
