= Medical practice consultants =

Medical Practice Consultants or Healthcare Management Consultants typically advise licensed healthcare providers and healthcare systems on business and administrative issues.

These topics commonly include governance, operations, human resources, finance, billing, coding, transactions and marketing.

Hospitals are engaging them more as physician practices are acquired and more physicians are employed. There are several trade associations in the US for healthcare business consultants.
