= Health fair =

Temporary exhibition

A health fair in March 2015

A health fair is an educational and interactive event designed for outreach to provide basic preventive medicine and medical screening to people in the community or employees at work in conjunction with workplace wellness. It can also be a public health intervention.

Health fairs are typically offered in the community, on site corporations, work sites, churches or schools. The consist of a variety of vendors and exhibitors that educate on all aspects of health, wellness, fitness and lifestyle improvements. Topics can include such things as chiropractic, acupuncture, fitness clubs and hospitals. It is very common to see health screenings such as cholesterol testing or blood pressure screenings. Health Fairs are advertised and promoted ahead of time by print media, radio, or television and are usually a one-day event.

Health fairs are often organized and run by professional health fair organization companies but can also be done by medical providers, benefits directors, medical students or nurses.

One example of a health fair is the Florida Keys Health Fairs.

== Critics ==
Some health fairs promote unnecessary and potentially harmful testing.

Some tests performed are actually not screening tests, like weight and blood pressure, which are appropriate screening tests for the general population. Instead, they are specialized tests, like vascular ultrasound, which are only appropriate for patients with relevant risk factors. When these tests are performed on the general population, they lead to false positive diagnoses, and dangerous and expensive follow-up testing, which have a risk of strokes and death. Many doctors feel that it is unethical for hospitals and doctors to cooperate with commercial testing services that market directly to the consumer, especially since many of the marketing claims are false.

For example, a for-profit business called HealthFair offers four cardiovascular disease screening packages, all of which include the following six tests: echocardiogram, electrocardiogram, carotid artery ultrasound, abdominal aortic aneurysm ultrasound, hardening of the arteries test, and peripheral arterial disease test. HealthFair charges $179 for the six tests.

Public Citizen sent letters to 20 hospitals on June 19, 2014, urging them to cut their relationships with HealthFair. Public Citizen said that HealthFair's "heavily promoted, community-wide cardiovascular health screening programs are unethical and are much more likely to do harm than good," and cited peer-reviewed evidence in support of their claims. For example, the American College of Cardiology Foundation and the American Heart Association recommend against echocardiograms in asymptomatic adults without hypertension.

In response, Terry Diaz, HealthFair's Chief Operating Officer, wrote, "Public Citizen is an organization dedicated to the creation of a single-payer system of healthcare called 'Medicare for All' which would be run and controlled by the government. This is strikingly opposite to our mission of helping make healthcare consumer-driven, a private choice between a patient and his/her physician, free from government intervention. Our goal is to educate and empower the consumer to decide what is best for them."
