= Physician engagement =

Physician engagement is the process of bringing physicians together with other healthcare stakeholders to continuously improve care and the patient experience. It is measured by physicians' increased satisfaction and loyalty to their affiliated organizations, as well as better alignment on key cost and quality improvements.

Efforts to drive physician engagement may include a mix of collaborative educational tools, incentives, and communication mechanisms for capturing feedback. Results of physician engagement may include reduced cost of care, improved outcomes, increased physician loyalty, and greater value for patients.
