= Drug utilization review =

Drug Utilization Review
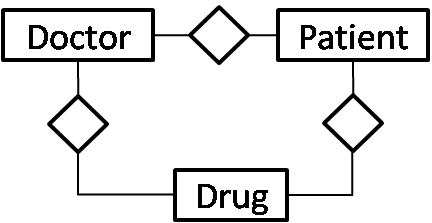
- Type: Pharmaceuticals policy
- Established: 1969
- Area size: major in Koern and America
- Establishments: private pharmaceutical management company

Drug utilization review refers to a review of prescribing, dispensing, administering and ingesting of medication. This authorized, structured and ongoing review is related to pharmacy benefit managers. Drug use/ utilization evaluation and medication utilization evaluations are the same as drug utilization review.

With the development of society and the economy, the costs of health care grows rapidly, and this becomes a burden on the worldwide health protection system. Aging populations, a changing disease spectrum, and the progress and change in technology of health care become the major problems which lead to increasing of health care costs. Then, how to use drug utilization evaluation and drug economy evaluation to improve and optimize the allocation of medical and health resources is a major problem faced by many countries.

Drug utilization reviews will help ensure that drugs are used appropriately (for individual patients). In the drug utilization review, medicine and health history including all phases of dispensing for a patient is exactly listed. Also, this review is designed to attempt to attain proper decision making therapeutically and gain a positive outcome for the patient. If treatment is considered inappropriate, it will be necessary to intervene with providers or patients to optimize medication. Then, especially in the community medicine setting, Drug utilization review plays a key role for pharmacist. In addition, The World Health Organization (WHO) regards drug utilization as 4 phases of drugs in society. These four phases are marketing, distribution, prescription and usage.

== History ==
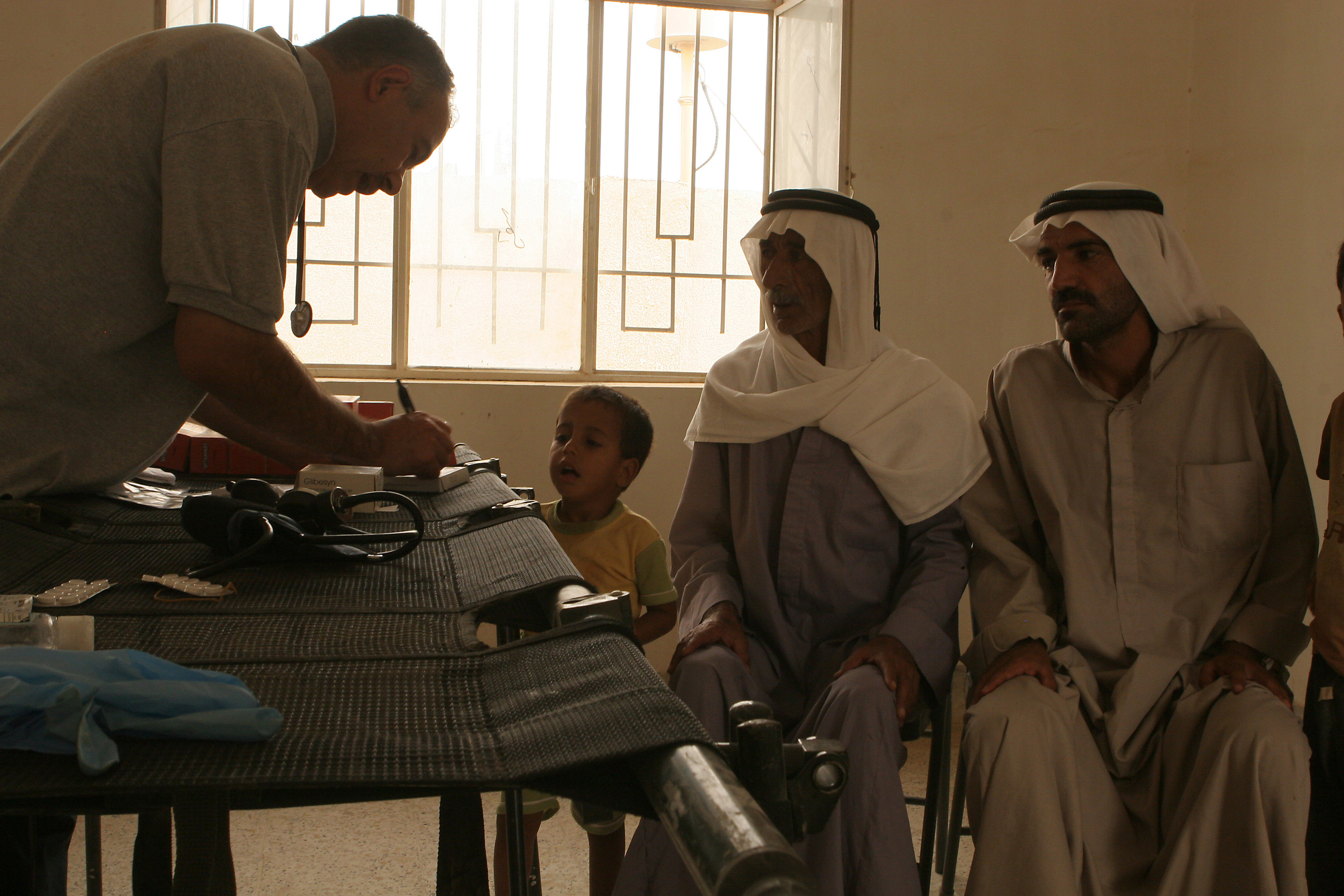
The doctor prescribes medication for patients

Drug utilization review originated from the North America. However, in the recent years, other countries do more research and studies about drug utilization review.

Some developments are regarded as important promoters for the appearance of drug utilization review. One factor is the increasing coverage of insurance for medication dispensing in the 1970s and 1980s. This insurance decreased the cost of medication dispensing for the economic interest and create computer-based data of patient therapy information. Another factor is that technical feasibility was improved in 1960s.

The first document published related to drug utilization review was in 1969. Drug utilization review acted as a background paper written by the United States Department of Health, Education, and Welfare task force. This task force considered that drug utilization review was potential but this review should be evaluated and need valid evidence to put into effect.

In 1970, Drug utilization review program was carried out by a private pharmaceutical management company. It focused on the cost of another program.

By the mid-1970, many medical programs cooperate with private companies that providing drug utilization review.

From 1985, hospitals in America are requested to use drug utilization review when using antibiotics.

In community pharmacy Settings, Federal Law (OBRA-90) requires drug utilization review for patients receiving medication through Medicaid. Then Drug utilization review was common in society.

Recognizing that Medicaid recipients faced similar risks in the 1980s, Congress provided for the ambulatory drug utilization review under the Omnibus Budget Reconciliation Act of 1990. It set up three relevant goals for a drug utilization review program. They are as follows: (1) reducing hospitalizations due to adverse drug events, (2) preventing and detecting fraud and abuse, and (3) supporting evidence-based prescribing through communication with others through academic details (i.e., face-to-face educational outreach by authoritative professionals in the non-profit sector).

Except goals mentioned above, there are still other goals of drug utilization review.

Other goals may include:

a. Promoting optimal medication and ensure that medication meets current standards of care.

b. Developing guidelines (standards) for appropriate drug use

c. Assess the effectiveness of medication

d. Enhance accountability in drug use

e. Control medical expenses

f. Prevention of drug-related problems such as adverse drug reactions, treatment failure, overuse, under-use, incorrect dosage and use of over-the-counter drugs

g. Identify areas where health care providers may need further information and education. Once the main problem areas have been identified (from integrated data, health indicators, qualitative studies, other appropriate studies, and even recommendations from developing country committee members), appropriate systems can be established relatively quickly.

== Three types of drug utilization review ==
=== Prospective ===
Prospective drug utilization review refers to assessing appropriate drug and decision making therapeutically before patients' medication are dispensed. This prospective review is based on the history recording of the drug and medication. Then, practitioners could assess therapy for patients on the basis history recording.

There are some issues addressed by this review: drug abuse clinically, alteration of drug dosage, drug–drug interaction, and drug-disease interaction.

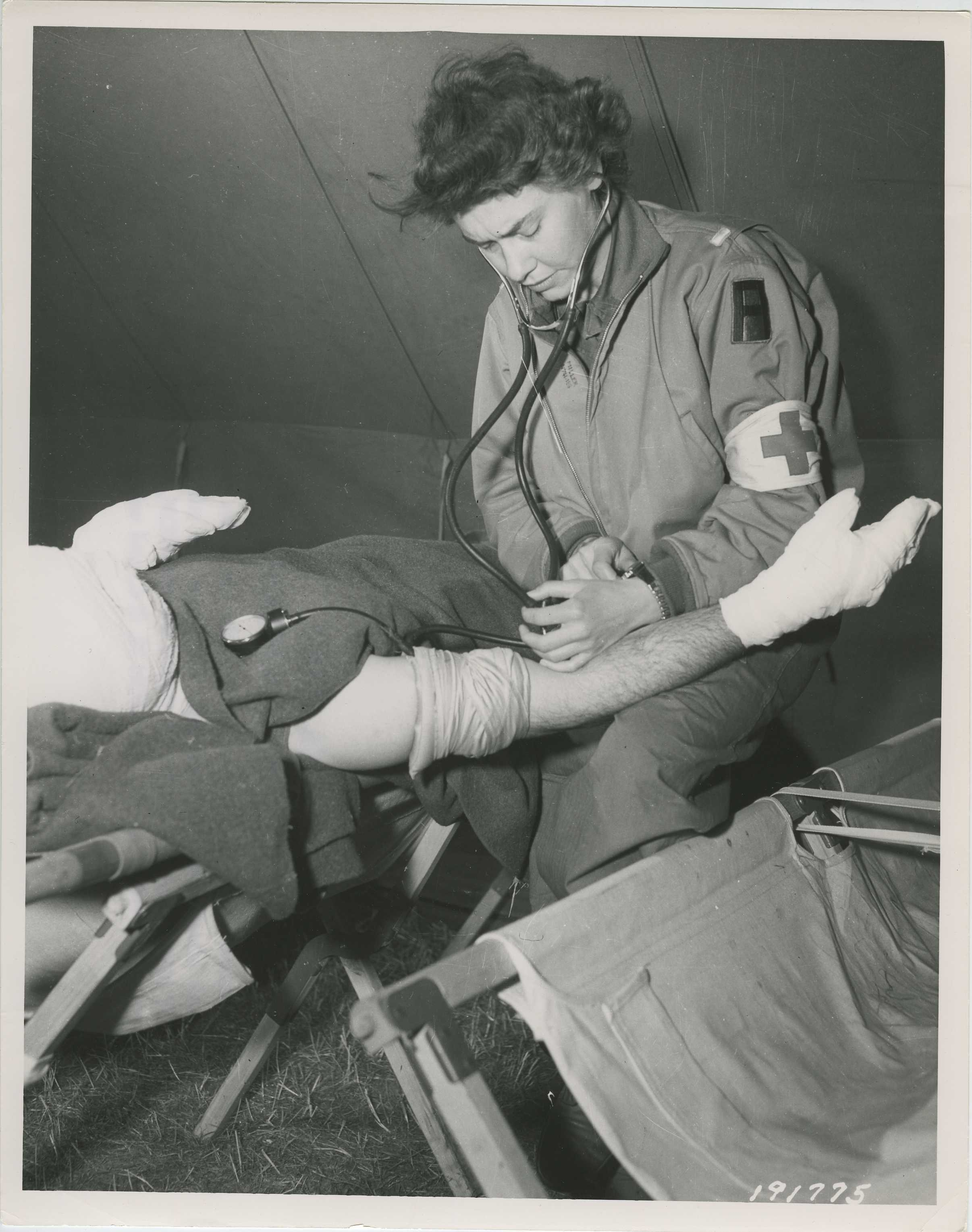
Measure and record the blood pressure for next therapy.

This review seems the best review over all three reviews because it is the closest option of the ideal.

=== Concurrent ===
Concurrent drug utilization review refers to conducting the review concurrently with the process of dispensing medication for patients. It means that the dispensing process will stop if a potential problem occurs and it is found by the review.

There are some issues addressed by this review: alteration of drug dosage, drug–drug interaction, drug-disease interaction, patient prevention with the drug, and over-utilization and under utilization.

However, there are still some problems in concurrent drug utilization review. The pharmacy of hospital and practitioners may not totally know the exact medications that patients normally use at home. Also, hospital and practitioners are not certain the document provided by patients is complete, and then this leads to some repeating test and medication. Thus, this review seems expensive and time-consuming.

=== Retrospective ===
Retrospective drug utilization review refers to drug therapy review that after patients have got the medication. The retrospective drug utilization review has a typical process. This is a computer based review. Computer will show data which are in violation of the standard. The standard are the rules or expectations for the outcome comparing with.

There are some issues addressed by this review: alteration of drug dosage, drug–drug interaction, drug-disease interaction, patient prevention with drug, over-utilization and under-utilization, drug abuse clinically, proper generic use, and false in drug dosage.

However, there are still some problems in retrospective drug utilization review. If a problem occurs, practitioners are possible to prevent much worse results by ceasing the therapy during the next phase review. But if the problem is serious or toxic, then the harm is irretrievable and the worst result is death.

== Steps in conducting drug utilization review ==
These are the steps:

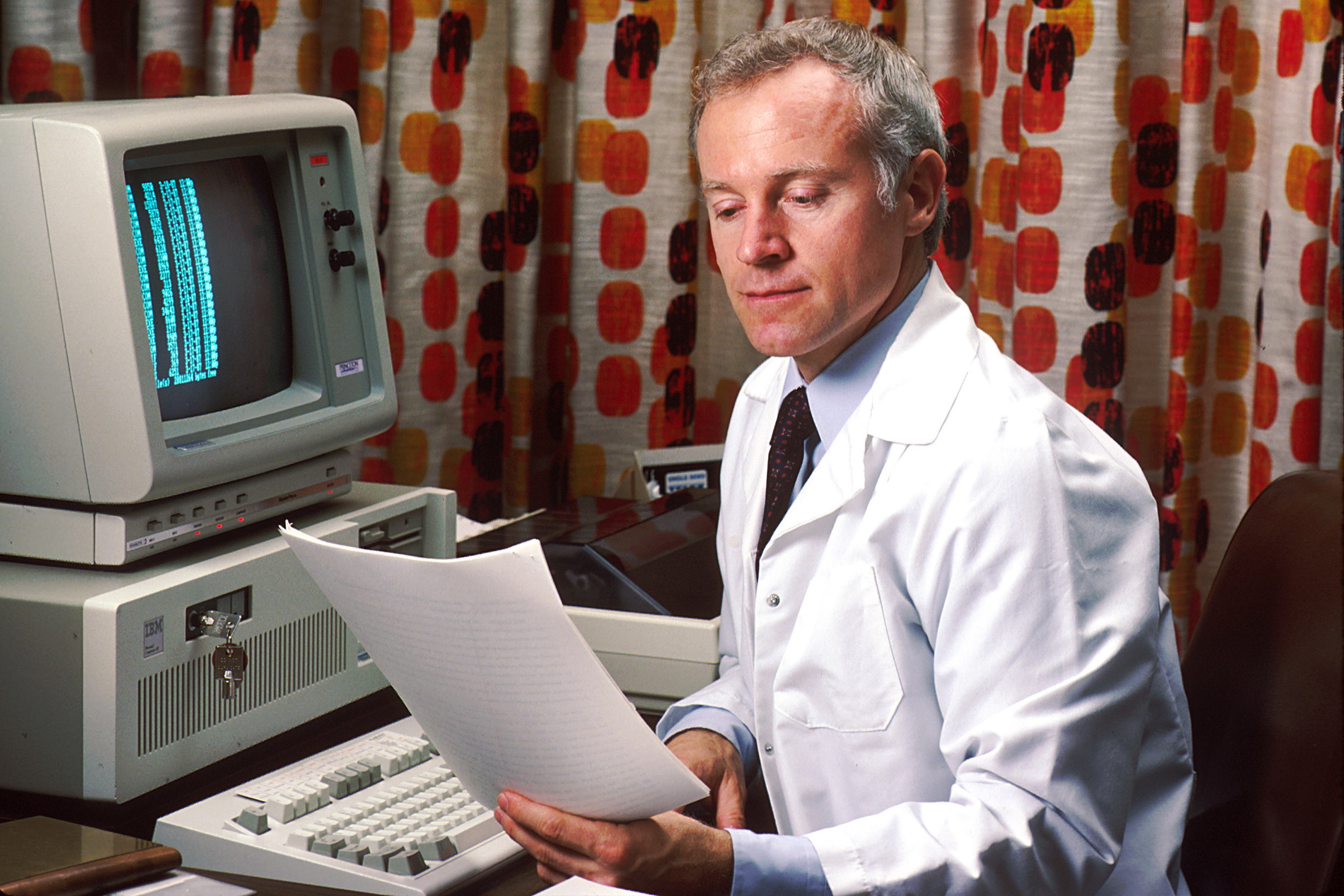
A doctor using computer-based data to review.

a. Determine the scope and objectives of activities and quest approval.

- The Drug and Therapeutics (or similar) committee should decide on appropriate targets and the scope of necessary activities. The scope can be very broad, or it can focus on one aspect of medication, depending on the type of problem identified, such as: given the abundance of drugs available in hospitals or clinics, the board must concentrate on those with the highest potential problems in order to maximize the return on the work involved.

b. Structure of the standard or criteria and apply them. (Standard and criteria must be valid.)

- It was extremely essential to set appropriate standards, which was the responsibility of the Drug and Therapeutics Committees. The appropriate criteria are the declarations that define the various ingredients for proper drug use. Standards for the use of any drug should use hospital standards, assuming they have been properly developed. In the absence of hospital standards, they may be based on recommendations from national or other locally available satisfactory drug use programs, other relevant literature sources and/or recognized international and local experts. Credibility and staff acceptance depend on the criteria used, which are based on reading established evidence-based medical information from reliable sources and have been discussed with prescriptions.
- Under the Medicare Prescription Drugs, Improvement and Modernization act of 2003, many beneficiaries will have more access to prescription drugs and may use more of them than they do, so a similar drug utilization review standard is needed to effectively implement the medicare prescription drug benefit.
- Components of Drug use for criteria or standard:

- uses: suitable for medicine, no contraindications

- selection: drugs that are appropriate for the clinical situation

- dosing: dose, treatment interval, and duration for specific indicators

- interactions: lack of interactions - drugs - drugs, drugs - foods, drug laboratories

- preparation: procedures for preparing medication delivery

- administration: administration steps, quantity distributed

- patient education: giving patients guidance on medications and specific diseases

- monitoring: clinical and laboratory

- results, such as: lower blood pressure, lower blood sugar, asthma attacks

c. Data collection.

- Data must be collected from an appropriate random sample of charts or prescription records at the health care facility, which are usually selected by pharmacy personnel, but also by nurses or medical records personnel. The larger the plant, the more practitioners it requires and the more records it needs to review and analyze. Data collection forms based on these standards can be configured as simple yes/no questions, or can include filling in open questions. Data sources include patient charts, dispensing records, medication management records, laboratory reports, adverse reaction reports, medication error reports, antimicrobial susceptibility reports, documented staff and patient complaints.

d. Assess and analyze yield.

- The data is tabulated in a format corresponding to the criteria selected for drug utilization review. The percentage of cases meeting each criterion should be calculated and summarized for submission to the Drug and Therapeutics Committee. A report on all appropriate programs under implementation should be prepared quarterly.

e. Set up intervention strategies.

- After providing information (such as about inappropriate drug use or unacceptable patient outcomes), the Drug and Therapeutics Committee should draw conclusions about differences between actual and expected outcomes. The Drug and Therapeutics Committee should then decide what follow-up action is required and whether to continue, halt, or expand the drug utilization review function. Recommendations should include specific steps to correct any drug use problems evident from the implementation of drug utilization review. For example, if the prescribed dose of a particular drug is too high, it is recommended that details be given on how to improve the dose of the drug.
- Interventions to improve drug use will include providing feedback to prescribes and may include:

- education

- preparation of drug order forms

- prescription restrictions

- change formula lists and/or manuals

- change standard treatment guidelines

- use another drug utilization review or continue with the current drug utilization review.

f. Re-apply standard or criteria to databases and revise standard or criteria as needed.

- In every drug utilization review, re-apply and revision is critical to ensure that any problem is properly addressed. As part of the plan, the Drug and Therapeutics Committee must assess whether it is necessary to continue, modify or suspend methods that have expired. Accordingly, appropriate activities should be evaluated on a regular basis (at least annually) and those that do not have a significant impact on drug use should be redesigned to provide measurable improvements.

Even though the model may be applied variously in various settings, major characteristics are the same during settings.

== Role and benefits of drug utilization review ==
Drug utilization review applies more and more in many aspects and areas. It is important for medication and mechanism to find the reasons and types of the variations and decrease the unfavorable and unsupportable variation. Also, drug utilization review technology show the possibility to the elevated pharmacy therapy over the history recording of medication. Drug utilization review helps pharmacists to evaluating the medication for patients. Drug utilization review plays a key role in therapy and medication dispensing. It also helps improving the medication and drug dosage and provides feedback to hospital and practitioners for their therapy and their performance. In addition, this Drug utilization review information may also encourage practitioners to modify and alter their normal habits in prescribing and then improve care.

However, the real value of such a system seems to lie in a retrospective review of practice patterns in different patients and at different times, combined with targeted educational outreach programs.

Medication use evaluation is beneficial to medical students and provides practice places. It not only improves prescribing practices and ensures safety outcomes but also help students improve their medication therapy.

== Future of drug utilization review ==
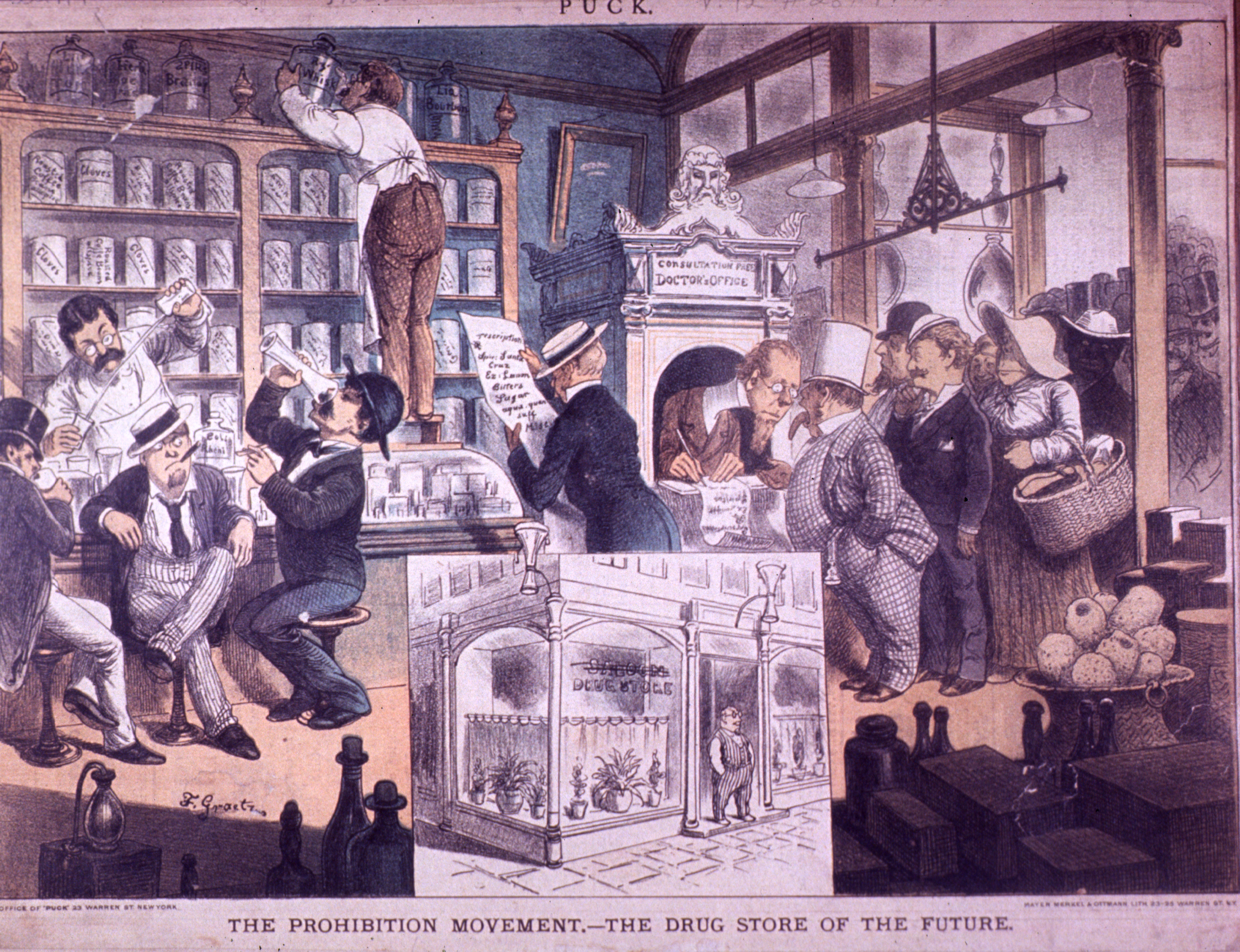
Drug store of future

According to reasonable research, prospective drug utilization review and retrospective drug utilization review program are not providing an improvement in the outcome of clinic within a basis of population. In addition, there exist some major drug utilization review program problems including questions and validity in standards and highly unacceptable alert rates. Furthermore, the knowledge base should be strengthened and improved.

The cost of non-optimal drug utilization is enormous and this was one of the reason that drug utilization review appears. The development and research of the drug utilization review program are expected and need more creative methods.

Furthermore, according to a research, some hospitals did not regard prospective and concurrent drug utilization review enablers such as CDSSs, PDCS, ICPS, PIS detection capabilities as standard procedures or services, as did retrospective drug utilization review. These hospitals have great opportunities for improvement in their drug utilization review programs.
