= Physician self-referral =

Physician self-referral is a term describing the practice of a physician ordering tests on a patient that are performed by either the referring physician himself or a fellow faculty member from whom he receives financial compensation in return for the referral. Examples of self-referral include an internist performing an EKG, a surgeon suggesting an operation that he himself would perform, and a physician ordering imaging tests that would be done at a facility he owns or leases.

The ability to self-refer is an incentive for physicians to order more tests than they otherwise might. In the United States, the Stark Law (specifically sections I and II) was designed to control self-referrals. However, the exceptions designed to allow necessary testing in physicians' offices have been exploited to circumvent the law. The in-office exception, which allows testing on equipment in the physician's office, has resulted in many physicians purchasing high-tech and expensive equipment such as CT scanners, MRI scanners, and nuclear scanners for their own offices.

The incentive for this practice is largely the result of rapidly declining reimbursements for what has been termed "cognitive" physician care, i.e. the time spent talking to a patient and determining what course of diagnostic testing or treatment would be best.

== History ==
One of the current areas of change in medicine lies in the location and interpreter of advanced imaging results, including MRIs, CT scans, PET scans, and ultrasounds. The trend for non-radiology physicians to evaluate their patients’ imaging results began more than thirty years ago. In the past, the majority of x-rays were interpreted by radiologists; today, it is very common for physicians to read them. The same trends are occurring for other imaging techniques.

Advanced medical imaging used to be provided only in hospitals and privately owned imaging centers, and, with some notable exceptions, were only evaluated by radiologists. An example of such an exception included the American Society of Neuroimaging, which, with its formation in 1975, incited neurologists to develop interest in the newest imaging techniques of the time to help evaluate their patients in non-invasive ways. Other specialists, such as cardiologists, neurosurgeons, and orthopedic physicians became more interested in using advanced imaging techniques as they continued to be refined and developed over the last two decades.

This change in the delivery of these services has resulted in the debate between radiologists and other medical specialists over the control and use of advanced medical imaging.

Historically, self-referral described the normal practice of a physician diagnosing a patient and then treating that individual if the treatment was within that doctor's scope of practice. However, several radiology authors have successfully used the term to describe the idea of self-referral for imaging services with the connotation that it is an undesirable and wasteful practice.

== Economic incentives ==
Self-referral has had the greatest influence on radiology. Normally, the revenue from imaging exams comes from two sources: the facility fee and the professional fee. The facility fee covers technical costs, such as use of the machine, while the professional fee is for the interpretation and consulting services provided by the physician. Physicians who own imaging machinery can derive profit by collecting both of these fees.

For example, when a patient is seen at a hospital and receives a CT scan, a technical fee is paid to the hospital to cover the cost of running the scanner, while the professional fee is charged by the radiologist for interpreting the results and documenting the findings. In self referral, however, a doctor seeing a patient in his office would recommend a test, often an echocardiography or nuclear cardiac imaging, that would be performed at his office and interpreted by him. Thus, the physician collects both the facility and professional fees.

== Negative consequences ==
The risk to the physician-owner for self-referring is minimal, since he can increase the volume of scans to any point necessary to ensure profitability. This is recognized by the machine vendors, who have moved aggressively to sell imaging machines to physicians who are not board-certified or specialized in radiology. One vendor of medical imaging equipment marketing to physicians states:

Are you dissatisfied with declining reimbursement rates, escalating demands on your time and increased competition? You can counteract these prevailing trends by capturing new revenue opportunities through providing diagnostic imaging services, such as MRI and CT, in your own office. Instead of sending your patients—and revenue—to another provider, your patients will appreciate the convenience, while you increase your bottom line.

=== Increased costs ===
There is a large volume research indicating that self-referral has a major effect on increasing medical costs in the US. David Levin estimated the cost of unnecessary self-referred imaging in 2004 to be, conservatively, $16 billion per year.

There are several examples showing that self-referral increases utilization and costs:

- Radionuclide myocardial perfusion imaging (RMPI) is used to assess the effect of coronary artery disease on the heart. From 1998 to 2002, the use of this test among radiologists has increased 2%, while among cardiologists, the rate increased by 78%. The bulk of this increase occurred in cardiologists' private offices', where they both recommend the exam and collected the fees to perform it rather than sending the patient to a hospital setting.
- A 2007 study found that a patient being cared for by a physician who practiced self-referral for imaging studies was 1.196 to 3.228 times more likely to have an imaging study done as compared to a patient being cared for by a physician who did not practice self-referral.
- Between 2000 and 2005, ownership or leasing of MRI scanners by non-radiologists grew by 254%, compared with an 83% increase among radiologists. By 2005, non-radiologists performed more than 384,000 MRI examinations on units they owned or leased, and their share of the private-office MRI market had increased from 11% in 2000 to 20% in 2005.

However, many of the studies on imaging have not taken into account the role of technological improvements in the increase of imaging over the last decade.

IOAS or in office ancillary services include a wide range of services. The provision allows physicians to offer services such as X-Ray, ultrasound and MRI. The practice is legal and ethical. Physicians have offered services in their offices such as X-Ray for decades. Studies show an increased use in ancillary services when the procedures are provided in their office. What the studies fail to show is the motivating factor. Assuming its financial, such motivation would violate the AMA's code of ethics. Other factors to consider are a faster diagnosis, less complex authorization and scheduling process, and the consolidation of medical records — all of which benefit the patient's treatment.

=== Quality ===
Modern MRI scans are very complex and require specialist training to be properly interpreted. An editorial in the Journal of the American College of Radiology lamented:

Radiology is still practiced to a great extent at a general practitioner level. A substantial proportion of imaging studies are interpreted by individuals with only resident-level training. Does a general radiologist understand more about imaging the brain than a neurologist who sees these patients and their brain images all day long? The uncomfortable truth is income concerns are more important than patient care.

== Convenience ==
Studies show patients benefit from IOAS through access to a wide range of diagnostic and therapeutic services sooner resulting in a quicker diagnosis. Furthermore, patients benefit from the cost savings an IOAS provides as do insurance companies. The myth that IOAS increases health care costs is perpetuated by the giant companies who own multiple clinics.

Self-referral is often defended for its convenience, though if the patient cannot be seen by the physician on the same day for imaging, the argument is negated.

== AMA position ==
On two different occasions, the American Medical Association House of Delegates has said that medical imaging should be performed by all physicians who are trained and qualified, and not only by one specialty group such as radiology, claiming that a monopoly by a single specialty would lead to lower quality in health care segments dependent upon imaging as well as higher costs.

== Attempts at resolution ==
The Medicare Improvements for Patients and Providers Act of 2008 aims to use point-of-order and point-of-service online approval systems to eliminate the overutilization presented by self-referrals.
