= List of MeSH codes (I01) =

The following is a partial list of the "I" codes for Medical Subject Headings (MeSH), as defined by the United States National Library of Medicine (NLM).

This list continues the information at List of MeSH codes (H01). Codes following these are found at List of MeSH codes (I02). For other MeSH codes, see List of MeSH codes.

The source for this content is the set of 2006 MeSH Trees from the NLM.

== MeSH I01 – social sciences ==
=== MeSH I01.076 – anthropology ===
- MeSH I01.076.201 – anthropology, cultural
- MeSH I01.076.201.208 – archaeology
- MeSH I01.076.201.450 – culture
- MeSH I01.076.201.450.050 – acculturation
- MeSH I01.076.201.450.170 – ceremonial behavior
- MeSH I01.076.201.450.199 – circumcision, female
- MeSH I01.076.201.450.226 – civilization
- MeSH I01.076.201.450.226.200 – arab world
- MeSH I01.076.201.450.226.800 – western world
- MeSH I01.076.201.450.226.800.250 – greek world
- MeSH I01.076.201.450.226.800.500 – roman world
- MeSH I01.076.201.450.281 – cross-cultural comparison
- MeSH I01.076.201.450.324 – cultural characteristics
- MeSH I01.076.201.450.350 – cultural diversity
- MeSH I01.076.201.450.370 – cultural evolution
- MeSH I01.076.201.450.457 – ethnology
- MeSH I01.076.201.450.515 – folklore
- MeSH I01.076.201.450.550 – funeral rites
- MeSH I01.076.201.450.560 – human body
- MeSH I01.076.201.450.654 – medicine, traditional
- MeSH I01.076.201.450.654.252 – ethnopharmacology
- MeSH I01.076.201.450.654.505 – medicine, African traditional
- MeSH I01.076.201.450.654.510 – medicine, arabic
- MeSH I01.076.201.450.654.510.500 – medicine, unani
- MeSH I01.076.201.450.654.515 – medicine, ayurvedic
- MeSH I01.076.201.450.654.600 – medicine, kampo
- MeSH I01.076.201.450.654.660 – medicine, oriental traditional
- MeSH I01.076.201.450.654.660.520 – medicine, chinese traditional
- MeSH I01.076.201.450.654.660.520.300 – qi
- MeSH I01.076.201.450.654.660.520.967 – yin-yang
- MeSH I01.076.201.450.654.660.600 – medicine, kampo
- MeSH I01.076.201.450.654.660.800 – medicine, tibetan traditional
- MeSH I01.076.201.450.654.745 – medicine, unani
- MeSH I01.076.201.450.654.830 – shamanism
- MeSH I01.076.201.450.897 – superstitions
- MeSH I01.076.201.450.897.439 – magic
- MeSH I01.076.201.450.897.439.925 – witchcraft
- MeSH I01.076.201.450.948 – taboo
- MeSH I01.076.368 – anthropology, physical
- MeSH I01.076.368.239 – craniology
- MeSH I01.076.368.400 – forensic anthropology
- MeSH I01.076.368.584 – paleontology
- MeSH I01.076.368.584.311 – fossils
- MeSH I01.076.368.584.500 – mummies
- MeSH I01.076.368.584.583 – paleodontology
- MeSH I01.076.368.584.709 – paleopathology

=== MeSH I01.198 – criminology ===
- MeSH I01.198.240 – crime
- MeSH I01.198.240.089 – abortion, criminal
- MeSH I01.198.240.300 – fraud
- MeSH I01.198.240.470 – homicide
- MeSH I01.198.240.470.572 – infanticide
- MeSH I01.198.240.748 – sex offenses
- MeSH I01.198.240.748.300 – child abuse, sexual
- MeSH I01.198.240.748.640 – rape
- MeSH I01.198.240.810 – theft
- MeSH I01.198.240.856 – violence
- MeSH I01.198.240.856.350 – domestic violence
- MeSH I01.198.240.856.350.250 – child abuse
- MeSH I01.198.240.856.350.250.255 – child abuse, sexual
- MeSH I01.198.240.856.350.250.525 – munchausen syndrome by proxy
- MeSH I01.198.240.856.350.390 – elder abuse
- MeSH I01.198.240.856.350.750 – spouse abuse
- MeSH I01.198.240.856.800 – terrorism
- MeSH I01.198.240.856.800.100 – bioterrorism
- MeSH I01.198.240.856.800.325 – chemical terrorism
- MeSH I01.198.240.856.800.750 – september 11 terrorist attacks
- MeSH I01.198.240.856.825 – torture
- MeSH I01.198.240.903 – war crimes
- MeSH I01.198.240.903.300 – holocaust
- MeSH I01.198.290 – criminal law
- MeSH I01.198.780 – forensic sciences
- MeSH I01.198.780.500 – forensic ballistics
- MeSH I01.198.780.750 – forensic anthropology
- MeSH I01.198.780.875 – forensic dentistry
- MeSH I01.198.780.937 – forensic medicine
- MeSH I01.198.780.937.120 – autopsy
- MeSH I01.198.780.937.206 – blood stains
- MeSH I01.198.780.937.343 – dermatoglyphics
- MeSH I01.198.780.937.375 – dna fingerprinting
- MeSH I01.198.780.937.422 – exhumation
- MeSH I01.198.780.937.460 – forensic pathology
- MeSH I01.198.780.937.469 – forensic psychiatry
- MeSH I01.198.780.937.469.528 – insanity defense
- MeSH I01.198.780.937.619 – lie detection
- MeSH I01.198.780.937.766 – paternity

=== MeSH I01.240 – demography ===
- MeSH I01.240.050 – age distribution
- MeSH I01.240.205 – censuses
- MeSH I01.240.361 – family characteristics
- MeSH I01.240.361.150 – birth intervals
- MeSH I01.240.361.160 – birth order
- MeSH I01.240.361.500 – marital status
- MeSH I01.240.361.500.300 – divorce
- MeSH I01.240.361.500.500 – marriage
- MeSH I01.240.361.500.725 – single person
- MeSH I01.240.361.500.725.700 – single parent
- MeSH I01.240.361.500.862 – widowhood
- MeSH I01.240.425 – health status
- MeSH I01.240.425.350 – geriatric assessment
- MeSH I01.240.600 – population dynamics
- MeSH I01.240.600.350 – emigration and immigration
- MeSH I01.240.600.400 – health transition
- MeSH I01.240.600.650 – population control
- MeSH I01.240.600.660 – population growth
- MeSH I01.240.800 – sex distribution
- MeSH I01.240.800.815 – sex ratio

=== MeSH I01.261 – economics ===
- MeSH I01.261.100 – capitalism
- MeSH I01.261.750 – resource allocation
- MeSH I01.261.750.500 – health care rationing

=== MeSH I01.409 – government ===
- MeSH I01.409.137 – federal government
- MeSH I01.409.137.500 – United States government agencies
- MeSH I01.409.275 – government agencies
- MeSH I01.409.275.125 – United States department of agriculture
- MeSH I01.409.275.250 – United States department of veterans affairs
- MeSH I01.409.275.300 – United States dept. of health and human services
- MeSH I01.409.275.300.310 – United States centers for medicare and medicaid services
- MeSH I01.409.275.300.650 – United States Public Health Service
- MeSH I01.409.275.300.650.225 – Centers for Disease Control and Prevention (U.S.)
- MeSH I01.409.275.300.650.225.520 – national institute for occupational safety and health
- MeSH I01.409.275.300.650.400 – national center for health care technology
- MeSH I01.409.275.300.650.425 – national center for health statistics (u.s.)
- MeSH I01.409.275.300.650.450 – national institutes of health (u.s.)
- MeSH I01.409.275.300.650.450.450 – national institute of mental health (u.s.)
- MeSH I01.409.275.300.650.450.475 – national library of medicine (u.s.)
- MeSH I01.409.275.300.650.700 – united states agency for healthcare research and quality
- MeSH I01.409.275.300.650.760 – United States Food and Drug Administration
- MeSH I01.409.275.300.650.790 – United States Health Resources and Services Administration
- MeSH I01.409.275.300.650.790.525 – national health planning information center
- MeSH I01.409.275.300.650.825 – United States indian health service
- MeSH I01.409.275.300.650.912 – United States office of research integrity
- MeSH I01.409.275.300.650.920 – United States substance abuse and mental health services administration
- MeSH I01.409.275.340 – United States environmental protection agency
- MeSH I01.409.275.380 – united states federal trade commission
- MeSH I01.409.275.405 – United States government agencies
- MeSH I01.409.275.430 – United States national aeronautics and space administration
- MeSH I01.409.275.480 – United States Occupational Safety and Health Administration
- MeSH I01.409.275.500 – United States office of economic opportunity
- MeSH I01.409.275.550 – United States Office of Technology Assessment
- MeSH I01.409.275.775 – United States Social Security Administration
- MeSH I01.409.550 – local government
- MeSH I01.409.700 – state government
- MeSH I01.409.850 – United States government agencies

=== MeSH I01.451 – government programs ===
- MeSH I01.451.227 – civil defense
- MeSH I01.451.617 – postal service

=== MeSH I01.615 – internationality ===
- MeSH I01.615.500 – international cooperation
- MeSH I01.615.500.250 – developed countries
- MeSH I01.615.500.250.300 – European Union
- MeSH I01.615.500.300 – developing countries
- MeSH I01.615.500.650 – international educational exchange
- MeSH I01.615.500.750 – medical missions, official

=== MeSH I01.696 – political systems ===
- MeSH I01.696.100 – capitalism
- MeSH I01.696.116 – colonialism
- MeSH I01.696.232 – communism
- MeSH I01.696.374 – democracy
- MeSH I01.696.586 – national socialism
- MeSH I01.696.798 – socialism

=== MeSH I01.738 – politics ===
- MeSH I01.738.610 – lobbying

=== MeSH I01.880 – sociology ===
- MeSH I01.880.143 – culture
- MeSH I01.880.143.079 – acculturation
- MeSH I01.880.143.257 – cross-cultural comparison
- MeSH I01.880.143.329 – cultural characteristics
- MeSH I01.880.143.400 – cultural deprivation
- MeSH I01.880.143.450 – cultural diversity
- MeSH I01.880.143.806 – psychosocial deprivation
- MeSH I01.880.225 – family
- MeSH I01.880.225.140 – adoption
- MeSH I01.880.225.281 – adult children
- MeSH I01.880.225.423 – family characteristics
- MeSH I01.880.225.423.500 – marital status
- MeSH I01.880.225.423.500.300 – divorce
- MeSH I01.880.225.423.500.500 – marriage
- MeSH I01.880.225.423.500.725 – single person
- MeSH I01.880.225.423.500.725.700 – single parent
- MeSH I01.880.225.423.500.862 – widowhood
- MeSH I01.880.225.465 – illegitimacy
- MeSH I01.880.225.500 – nuclear family
- MeSH I01.880.225.500.280 – only child
- MeSH I01.880.225.500.340 – parents
- MeSH I01.880.225.500.340.210 – fathers
- MeSH I01.880.225.500.340.270 – mothers
- MeSH I01.880.225.500.340.785 – single parent
- MeSH I01.880.225.500.340.892 – surrogate mothers
- MeSH I01.880.225.500.505 – siblings
- MeSH I01.880.225.500.670 – spouses
- MeSH I01.880.225.750 – single-parent family
- MeSH I01.880.298 – hierarchy, social
- MeSH I01.880.371 – minority groups
- MeSH I01.880.448 – secularism
- MeSH I01.880.526 – social change
- MeSH I01.880.526.726 – urbanization
- MeSH I01.880.552 – social class
- MeSH I01.880.552.673 – social mobility
- MeSH I01.880.578 – social conditions
- MeSH I01.880.578.283 – anomie
- MeSH I01.880.604 – social control, formal
- MeSH I01.880.604.100 – animal welfare
- MeSH I01.880.604.100.049 – animal care committees
- MeSH I01.880.604.100.100 – animal rights
- MeSH I01.880.604.160 – capital punishment
- MeSH I01.880.604.316 – coercion
- MeSH I01.880.604.394 – government regulation
- MeSH I01.880.604.473 – human rights
- MeSH I01.880.604.473.300 – child advocacy
- MeSH I01.880.604.473.352 – civil rights
- MeSH I01.880.604.473.352.500 – privacy
- MeSH I01.880.604.473.352.500.320 – genetic privacy
- MeSH I01.880.604.473.352.500.500 – Access to Information
- MeSH I01.880.604.473.352.500.500.500 – patient access to records
- MeSH I01.880.604.473.368 – consumer advocacy
- MeSH I01.880.604.473.380 – freedom
- MeSH I01.880.604.473.380.500 – personal autonomy
- MeSH I01.880.604.473.650 – patient rights
- MeSH I01.880.604.473.650.500 – confidentiality
- MeSH I01.880.604.473.650.500.320 – genetic privacy
- MeSH I01.880.604.473.650.718 – informed consent
- MeSH I01.880.604.473.650.827 – patient access to records
- MeSH I01.880.604.473.650.952 – right to die
- MeSH I01.880.604.473.650.968 – treatment refusal
- MeSH I01.880.604.473.675 – reproductive rights
- MeSH I01.880.604.473.700 – social justice
- MeSH I01.880.604.473.850 – women's rights
- MeSH I01.880.604.583 – jurisprudence
- MeSH I01.880.604.583.020 – advance directives
- MeSH I01.880.604.583.020.500 – living wills
- MeSH I01.880.604.583.050 – compensation and redress
- MeSH I01.880.604.583.080 – confidentiality
- MeSH I01.880.604.583.080.270 – duty to warn
- MeSH I01.880.604.583.080.320 – genetic privacy
- MeSH I01.880.604.583.090 – contracts
- MeSH I01.880.604.583.100 – criminal law
- MeSH I01.880.604.583.166 – duty to recontact
- MeSH I01.880.604.583.232 – expert testimony
- MeSH I01.880.604.583.310 – forensic psychiatry
- MeSH I01.880.604.583.310.528 – insanity defense
- MeSH I01.880.604.583.427 – informed consent
- MeSH I01.880.604.583.427.134 – consent forms
- MeSH I01.880.604.583.427.635 – third-party consent
- MeSH I01.880.604.583.427.635.500 – parental consent
- MeSH I01.880.604.583.458 – intellectual property
- MeSH I01.880.604.583.458.300 – copyright
- MeSH I01.880.604.583.458.650 – patents
- MeSH I01.880.604.583.474 – judicial role
- MeSH I01.880.604.583.490 – liability, legal
- MeSH I01.880.604.583.524 – malpractice
- MeSH I01.880.604.583.524.300 – defensive medicine
- MeSH I01.880.604.583.524.528 – professional impairment
- MeSH I01.880.604.583.524.528.500 – physician impairment
- MeSH I01.880.604.583.527 – mandatory reporting
- MeSH I01.880.604.583.530 – mental competency
- MeSH I01.880.604.583.594 – ownership
- MeSH I01.880.604.583.659 – presumed consent
- MeSH I01.880.604.583.789 – resuscitation orders
- MeSH I01.880.604.583.858 – supreme court decisions
- MeSH I01.880.604.583.927 – wills
- MeSH I01.880.604.583.927.500 – living wills
- MeSH I01.880.604.583.963 – wrongful life
- MeSH I01.880.604.594 – law enforcement
- MeSH I01.880.604.605 – legislation, drug
- MeSH I01.880.604.605.250 – drug and narcotic control
- MeSH I01.880.604.605.250.250 – drug approval
- MeSH I01.880.604.622 – mandatory programs
- MeSH I01.880.604.622.249 – mandatory reporting
- MeSH I01.880.604.622.500 – mandatory testing
- MeSH I01.880.604.631 – patient advocacy
- MeSH I01.880.604.640 – peer review
- MeSH I01.880.604.640.690 – peer review, health care
- MeSH I01.880.604.640.700 – peer review, research
- MeSH I01.880.604.646 – police
- MeSH I01.880.604.787 – prisons
- MeSH I01.880.604.787.358 – concentration camps
- MeSH I01.880.604.825 – social control policies
- MeSH I01.880.604.825.550 – organizational policy
- MeSH I01.880.604.825.608 – public policy
- MeSH I01.880.604.825.608.200 – family planning policy
- MeSH I01.880.604.825.608.400 – health policy
- MeSH I01.880.604.825.608.400.285 – health care reform
- MeSH I01.880.604.825.608.400.650 – nutrition policy
- MeSH I01.880.630 – social control, informal
- MeSH I01.880.630.099 – behavior control
- MeSH I01.880.630.200 – coercion
- MeSH I01.880.630.548 – public opinion
- MeSH I01.880.630.716 – punishment
- MeSH I01.880.656 – social environment
- MeSH I01.880.656.300 – community networks
- MeSH I01.880.656.600 – social support
- MeSH I01.880.683 – social isolation
- MeSH I01.880.683.435 – loneliness
- MeSH I01.880.683.755 – social alienation
- MeSH I01.880.709 – social planning
- MeSH I01.880.709.202 – city planning
- MeSH I01.880.709.359 – environment design
- MeSH I01.880.709.876 – urban renewal
- MeSH I01.880.735 – social problems
- MeSH I01.880.735.140 – civil disorders
- MeSH I01.880.735.140.652 – riots
- MeSH I01.880.735.191 – crime
- MeSH I01.880.735.191.410 – theft
- MeSH I01.880.735.223 – dangerous behavior
- MeSH I01.880.735.255 – divorce
- MeSH I01.880.735.265 – doping in sports
- MeSH I01.880.735.344 – homicide
- MeSH I01.880.735.344.500 – euthanasia
- MeSH I01.880.735.344.500.249 – euthanasia, active
- MeSH I01.880.735.344.500.249.200 – euthanasia, active, voluntary
- MeSH I01.880.735.384 – human rights abuses
- MeSH I01.880.735.424 – illegitimacy
- MeSH I01.880.735.442 – incest
- MeSH I01.880.735.479 – juvenile delinquency
- MeSH I01.880.735.580 – needle sharing
- MeSH I01.880.735.634 – poverty
- MeSH I01.880.735.679 – prostitution
- MeSH I01.880.735.728 – quackery
- MeSH I01.880.735.768 – race relations
- MeSH I01.880.735.779 – runaway behavior
- MeSH I01.880.735.784 – social behavior disorders
- MeSH I01.880.735.784.350 – general adaptation syndrome
- MeSH I01.880.735.856 – suicide
- MeSH I01.880.735.856.300 – suicide, assisted
- MeSH I01.880.735.856.600 – suicide, attempted
- MeSH I01.880.735.900 – violence
- MeSH I01.880.735.900.350 – domestic violence
- MeSH I01.880.735.900.350.250 – child abuse
- MeSH I01.880.735.900.350.250.255 – child abuse, sexual
- MeSH I01.880.735.900.350.250.525 – munchausen syndrome by proxy
- MeSH I01.880.735.900.350.390 – elder abuse
- MeSH I01.880.735.900.350.750 – spouse abuse
- MeSH I01.880.735.900.800 – terrorism
- MeSH I01.880.735.900.800.100 – bioterrorism
- MeSH I01.880.735.900.800.150 – chemical terrorism
- MeSH I01.880.735.900.825 – torture
- MeSH I01.880.735.944 – war
- MeSH I01.880.735.944.226 – biological warfare
- MeSH I01.880.735.944.226.100 – bioterrorism
- MeSH I01.880.735.944.340 – chemical warfare
- MeSH I01.880.735.944.340.150 – chemical terrorism
- MeSH I01.880.735.944.600 – nuclear warfare
- MeSH I01.880.735.944.711 – psychological warfare
- MeSH I01.880.735.944.903 – war crimes
- MeSH I01.880.735.944.903.300 – holocaust
- MeSH I01.880.787 – social welfare
- MeSH I01.880.787.190 – charities
- MeSH I01.880.787.190.500 – almshouses
- MeSH I01.880.787.293 – child welfare
- MeSH I01.880.787.293.292 – child abuse
- MeSH I01.880.787.293.292.304 – battered child syndrome
- MeSH I01.880.787.293.292.325 – child abuse, sexual
- MeSH I01.880.787.293.292.525 – munchausen syndrome by proxy
- MeSH I01.880.787.293.350 – child advocacy
- MeSH I01.880.787.293.370 – child custody
- MeSH I01.880.787.293.392 – child day care centers
- MeSH I01.880.787.539 – infant welfare
- MeSH I01.880.787.678 – maternal welfare
- MeSH I01.880.787.839 – relief work
- MeSH I01.880.792 – social work
- MeSH I01.880.792.410 – social work, psychiatric
- MeSH I01.880.813 – socialization
- MeSH I01.880.840 – socioeconomic factors
- MeSH I01.880.840.200 – career mobility
- MeSH I01.880.840.535 – poverty
- MeSH I01.880.840.535.550 – poverty areas
- MeSH I01.880.840.755 – social class
- MeSH I01.880.840.755.673 – social mobility
- MeSH I01.880.866 – sociometric techniques
- MeSH I01.880.894 – spatial behavior

The list continues at List of MeSH codes (I02).
