= Aum Shinrikyo and weapons of mass destruction =

Unconventional weapons of Japanese doomsday cult

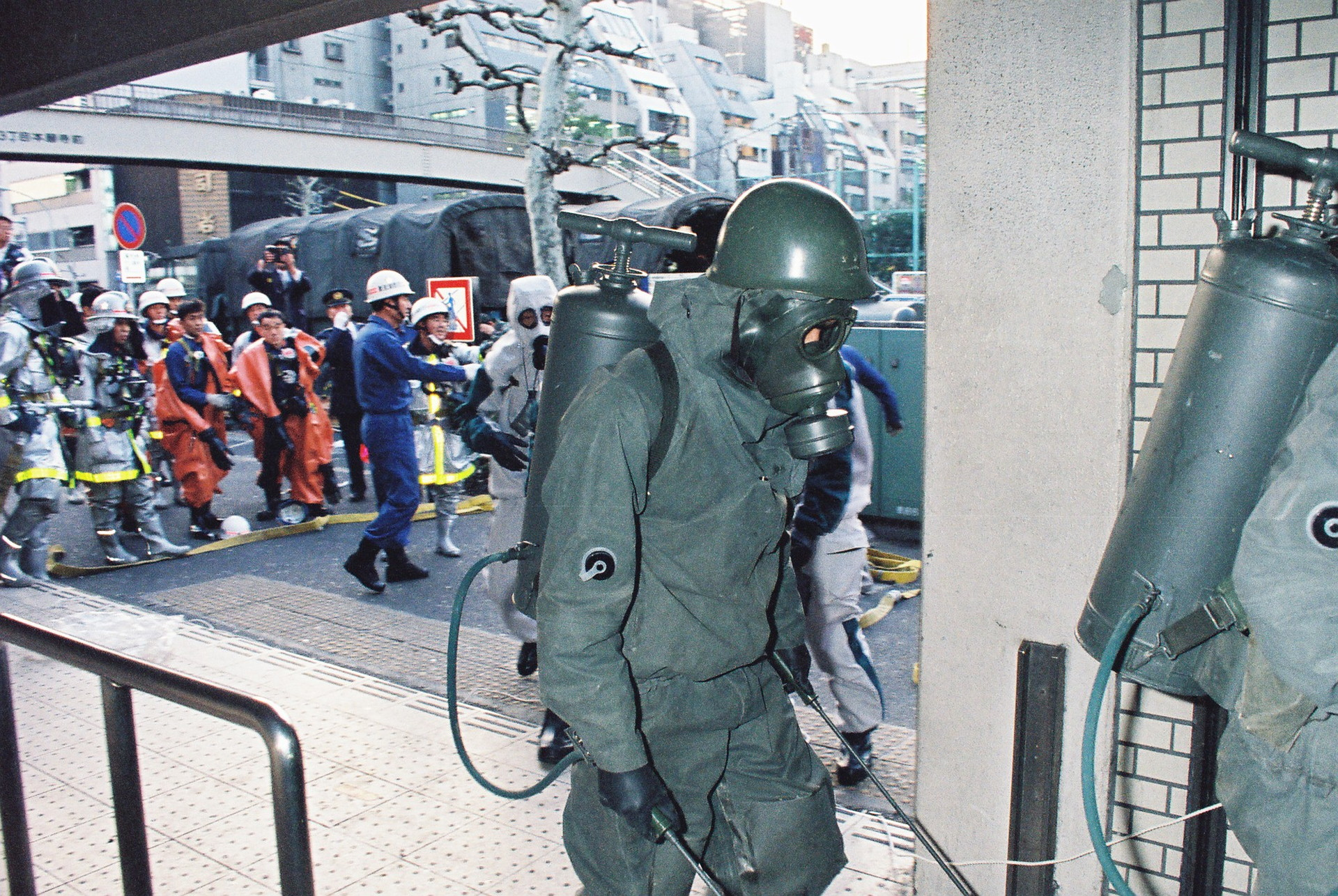
Japan Ground Self-Defense Forces personnel on their way to decontamination activities at the scene of Aum Shinrikyo's Tokyo subway sarin attack, 1995.

Aum Shinrikyo, a Japanese new religious movement and doomsday cult, carried out multiple fatal chemical terrorist attacks, attempted bioterrorist attacks, and showed preliminary interest in nuclear terrorism during the 1990s.

Aum's chemical attacks remain the most significant by a violent non-state actor (VNSA). The 1994 Matsumoto sarin attack and 1995 Tokyo subway sarin attack were the first lethal non-state actor attacks to use nerve agents, and the group also carried out the first known attacks using VX in 1994 assassination attempts.

Aum also operated the most extensive biological weapons program by a VNSA ever discovered. Aum considered a range of agents, but only seriously attempted to obtain and disperse Bacillus anthracis and botulinum toxin, the causative agents of anthrax and botulism. Alongside the 2001 anthrax attacks, it comprises the only attempts to use anthrax as a weapon not attributed to a state program.

Aum Shinrikyo member Kiyohide Hayakawa expressed interest in acquiring or purchasing nuclear weapons from the post-Soviet states, and received multiple sale offers as low as US$15 million.

== Chemical weapons ==
=== Matsumoto sarin attack ===
The Matsumoto sarin attack was a domestic chemical terrorist attack and attempted assassination perpetrated by members of the Aum Shinrikyo doomsday cult in Matsumoto, Nagano Prefecture, Japan, on the night of June 27, 1994. Eight people were killed and more than 500 were harmed by sarin aerosol that was released from a converted refrigerator truck in the Kaichi Heights area. The attack was perpetrated nine months before the better-known Tokyo subway sarin attack.

=== VX assassination attempts ===
In December 1994 and January 1995, Aum Shinrikyo member Masami Tsuchiya synthesized 100 to 200 grams of VX which was used to attack three people. On 2 December, Noboru Mizuno, who was believed to have assisted former members of Aum, was attacked with syringes containing VX gas, leaving him in a serious condition. Tadahito Hamaguchi, whom Asahara suspected was a spy, was attacked at 7:00 a.m. on 12 December 1994 on the street in Osaka by Tomomitsu Niimi and another Aum member, who sprinkled the nerve agent on his neck. He chased them for about 100 yards (91 m) before collapsing, dying 10 days later without coming out of a deep coma. Doctors in the hospital suspected at the time he had been poisoned with an organophosphate pesticide, the cause of death pinned down only after cult members arrested for the subway attack in Tokyo in March 1995 confessed to the killing. Ethyl methylphosphonate, methylphosphonic acid, and diisopropyl-2-(methylthio) ethylamine were later found in the body of the victim; unlike the cases for sarin (Matsumoto incident and Sarin gas attack on the Tokyo subway), VX was not used for mass murder.

On 4 January 1995, the cult tried to kill Hiroyuki Nagaoka, an important member of the Aum Victims' Society, a civil organization that protested against the sect's activities, in the same way. In February 1995, several cult members kidnapped Kiyoshi Kariya, the 69-year-old brother of an escaped former member, from a Tokyo street and took him to a compound in Kamikuishiki near Mount Fuji, where he was killed. His corpse was destroyed in a microwave-powered incinerator and the remnants disposed of in Lake Kawaguchi. Before Kariya was abducted, he had been receiving threatening phone calls demanding to know the whereabouts of his sister, and he had left a note saying, "If I disappear, I was abducted by Aum Shinrikyo".

=== Tokyo subway sarin attack ===
The Tokyo subway sarin attack (Japanese: 地下鉄サリン事件, Hepburn: Chikatetsu sarin jiken; lit. 'subway sarin incident') was a domestic chemical terrorist attack perpetrated on 20 March 1995, in Tokyo, Japan, by members of the Aum Shinrikyo cult. In five coordinated attacks, the perpetrators released sarin, a nerve agent, on three lines of the Tokyo Metro (then Teito Rapid Transit Authority) during rush hour, killing 14 people, severely injuring 50 (some of whom later died), and causing temporary vision problems for nearly 1,000 others. The attack was directed against trains passing through Kasumigaseki and Nagatachō, where the National Diet (Japanese parliament) is headquartered in Tokyo.

Confirmed chemical attacks executed by Aum Shinrikyo
Date	Agent	Location	Fatalities	Injuries	Comments
Late 1993-early 1994	Sarin	Tokyo	0	0	Two failed attempts to assassinate Daisaku Ikeda, leader of Soka Gakkai.
9 May 1994	Sarin	Tokyo	0	1	Attempted assassination of Taro Takimoto, an attorney working on behalf of victims of the group – Takimoto was hospitalized but made a full recovery.
27 June 1994	Sarin	Matsumoto	8	500	Matsumoto sarin attack
20 September 1994	Phosgene	Yokohama	0	1	Attempted assassination of Shoko Egawa, a journalist who had covered the 1989 disappearance of Tsutsumi Sakamoto.
Late 1994	VX	Various	0–20	unknown	VX was allegedly used to assassinate up to 20 dissident Aum members.
28 November and 2 December 1994	VX	Tokyo	0	1	Two attempts to murder a man assisting dissident Aum members, man hospitalized for 45 days.
12 December 1994	VX	Osaka	1	0	Posing as joggers, Aum members sprayed Tadahito Hamaguchi, a man who the cult believed was spying on them, with VX from a syringe. He was pronounced dead four days later.
4 January 1995	VX	Tokyo	0	1	Attempted assassination of Hiroyuki Nagaoka, head of the 'Aum Shinrikyo Victim's Group' – Nagaoka was hospitalized for several weeks.
February 1995	VX	Tokyo	0	0	Attempted assassination of Ryuho Okawa, leader of the Institute for Research into Human Happiness, who had criticized the group – Okawa suffered no ill effects.
20 March 1995	Sarin	Tokyo	14	1,000	Tokyo subway sarin attack
5 May 1995	Hydrogen cyanide	Tokyo	0	4	Two vinyl bags – one containing sulfuric acid and the other containing sodium cyanide – were found, on fire, in the toilet of a subway station. Four injuries.

== Biological weapons ==
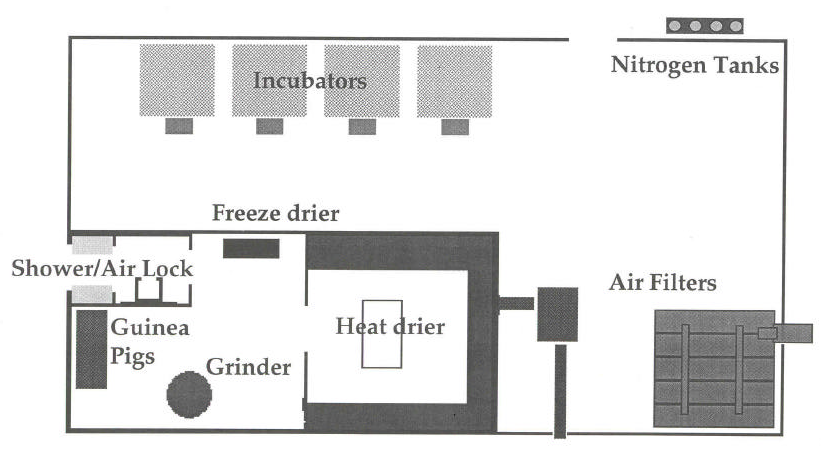
Layout of the Aum Shinrikyo biological weapons facility

Aum Shinrikyo operated the most extensive biological weapons program by a non-state actor ever discovered. Aum considered a range of agents, but only seriously attempted to obtain and disperse Bacillus anthracis and botulinum toxin, the causative agents of anthrax and botulism. With the 2001 anthrax attacks, it comprises the only attempts to use anthrax as a weapon not attributed to a state program.

In July 1993, cult members sprayed large amounts of liquid containing Bacillus anthracis spores from a cooling tower on the roof of Aum Shinrikyo's Tokyo headquarters. However, their plan to cause an anthrax epidemic failed, likely because they used a vaccine strain of Bacillus anthracis that is generally regarded as nonpathogenic. The attack resulted in a large number of complaints about bad odors but no infections.

== Nuclear weapons ==
According to Japanese police and US Senate reports, Aum Shinrikyo member Kiyohide Hayakawa expressed interest in acquiring or purchasing nuclear weapons from the post-Soviet states, and received multiple sale offers as low as US$15 million.

== See also ==
- Islamic State and weapons of mass destruction
