= List of MeSH codes (I02) =

The following is a partial list of the "I" codes for Medical Subject Headings (MeSH), as defined by the United States National Library of Medicine (NLM).

This list continues the information at List of MeSH codes (I01). Codes following these are found at List of MeSH codes (I03). For other MeSH codes, see List of MeSH codes.

The source for this content is the set of 2006 MeSH Trees from the NLM.

== MeSH I02 – education ==
=== MeSH I02.158 – curriculum ===
- MeSH I02.158.210 – competency-based education
- MeSH I02.158.600 – mainstreaming (education)
- MeSH I02.158.660 – problem-based learning

=== MeSH I02.233 – education, nonprofessional ===
- MeSH I02.233.213 – education, special
- MeSH I02.233.213.400 – education of mentally retarded
- MeSH I02.233.213.600 – mainstreaming (education)
- MeSH I02.233.332 – health education
- MeSH I02.233.332.374 – health education, dental
- MeSH I02.233.332.390 – health fairs
- MeSH I02.233.332.500 – patient education
- MeSH I02.233.332.749 – sex education
- MeSH I02.233.543 – physical education and training
- MeSH I02.233.543.454 – gymnastics
- MeSH I02.233.659 – schools
- MeSH I02.233.659.660 – schools, nursery
- MeSH I02.233.748 – students
- MeSH I02.233.748.686 – student dropouts
- MeSH I02.233.862 – vocational education

=== MeSH I02.358 – education, professional ===
- MeSH I02.358.212 – education, continuing
- MeSH I02.358.212.249 – education, dental, continuing
- MeSH I02.358.212.350 – education, medical, continuing
- MeSH I02.358.212.450 – education, nursing, continuing
- MeSH I02.358.212.550 – education, pharmacy, continuing
- MeSH I02.358.212.590 – education, professional, retraining
- MeSH I02.358.274 – education, dental
- MeSH I02.358.274.316 – education, dental, continuing
- MeSH I02.358.274.482 – education, dental, graduate
- MeSH I02.358.337 – education, graduate
- MeSH I02.358.337.249 – education, dental, graduate
- MeSH I02.358.337.350 – education, medical, graduate
- MeSH I02.358.337.450 – education, nursing, graduate
- MeSH I02.358.337.550 – education, pharmacy, graduate
- MeSH I02.358.399 – education, medical
- MeSH I02.358.399.250 – education, medical, continuing
- MeSH I02.358.399.350 – education, medical, graduate
- MeSH I02.358.399.450 – education, medical, undergraduate
- MeSH I02.358.399.450.110 – clinical clerkship
- MeSH I02.358.399.644 – internship and residency
- MeSH I02.358.462 – education, nursing
- MeSH I02.358.462.233 – education, nursing, associate
- MeSH I02.358.462.316 – education, nursing, baccalaureate
- MeSH I02.358.462.399 – education, nursing, continuing
- MeSH I02.358.462.482 – education, nursing, diploma programs
- MeSH I02.358.462.565 – education, nursing, graduate
- MeSH I02.358.462.612 – nursing education research
- MeSH I02.358.525 – education, pharmacy
- MeSH I02.358.525.317 – education, pharmacy, continuing
- MeSH I02.358.525.483 – education, pharmacy, graduate
- MeSH I02.358.556 – education, public health professional
- MeSH I02.358.588 – education, veterinary
- MeSH I02.358.750 – internship, nonmedical

=== MeSH I02.399 – educational measurement ===
- MeSH I02.399.272 – college admission test
- MeSH I02.399.630 – professional competence
- MeSH I02.399.630.210 – clinical competence
- MeSH I02.399.750 – school admission criteria
- MeSH I02.399.780 – self-evaluation programs

=== MeSH I02.463 – faculty ===
- MeSH I02.463.273 – faculty, dental
- MeSH I02.463.373 – faculty, medical
- MeSH I02.463.473 – faculty, nursing

=== MeSH I02.574 – inservice training ===
- MeSH I02.574.700 – staff development

=== MeSH I02.783 – schools ===
- MeSH I02.783.388 – library schools
- MeSH I02.783.660 – schools, health occupations
- MeSH I02.783.660.125 – area health education centers
- MeSH I02.783.660.481 – schools, dental
- MeSH I02.783.660.552 – schools, medical
- MeSH I02.783.660.623 – schools, nursing
- MeSH I02.783.660.694 – schools, pharmacy
- MeSH I02.783.660.765 – schools, public health
- MeSH I02.783.660.836 – schools, veterinary
- MeSH I02.783.850 – universities

=== MeSH I02.851 – students ===
- MeSH I02.851.686 – students, health occupations
- MeSH I02.851.686.519 – students, dental
- MeSH I02.851.686.602 – students, medical
- MeSH I02.851.686.685 – students, nursing
- MeSH I02.851.686.768 – students, pharmacy
- MeSH I02.851.686.851 – students, premedical

=== MeSH I02.903 – teaching ===
- MeSH I02.903.080 – computer user training
- MeSH I02.903.302 – models, educational
- MeSH I02.903.525 – patient simulation
- MeSH I02.903.565 – problem-based learning
- MeSH I02.903.573 – programmed instruction
- MeSH I02.903.573.208 – computer-assisted instruction
- MeSH I02.903.694 – remedial teaching

The list continues at List of MeSH codes (I03).
