= List of MeSH codes (I03) =

The following is a partial list of the "I" codes for Medical Subject Headings (MeSH), as defined by the United States National Library of Medicine (NLM).

This list continues the information at List of MeSH codes (I02). Codes following these are found at List of MeSH codes (J01). For other MeSH codes, see List of MeSH codes.

The source for this content is the set of 2006 MeSH Trees from the NLM.

== MeSH I03 – human activities ==
=== MeSH I03.125 – automobile driving ===
- MeSH I03.125.299 – automobile driver examination

=== MeSH I03.450 – leisure activities ===
- MeSH I03.450.345 – holidays
- MeSH I03.450.642 – recreation
- MeSH I03.450.642.159 – camping
- MeSH I03.450.642.287 – dancing
- MeSH I03.450.642.378 – gardening
- MeSH I03.450.642.469 – hobbies
- MeSH I03.450.642.693 – play and playthings
- MeSH I03.450.642.693.930 – video games
- MeSH I03.450.642.845 – sports
- MeSH I03.450.642.845.110 – baseball
- MeSH I03.450.642.845.117 – basketball
- MeSH I03.450.642.845.140 – bicycling
- MeSH I03.450.642.845.210 – boxing
- MeSH I03.450.642.845.300 – football (includes North American gridiron football and rugby football, but not association football (soccer))
- MeSH I03.450.642.845.400 – golf
- MeSH I03.450.642.845.417 – gymnastics
- MeSH I03.450.642.845.475 – hockey
- MeSH I03.450.642.845.560 – martial arts
- MeSH I03.450.642.845.560.500 – tai ji
- MeSH I03.450.642.845.582 – mountaineering
- MeSH I03.450.642.845.600 – racquet sports
- MeSH I03.450.642.845.600.900 – tennis
- MeSH I03.450.642.845.610 – running
- MeSH I03.450.642.845.610.320 – jogging
- MeSH I03.450.642.845.700 – skating
- MeSH I03.450.642.845.787 – snow sports
- MeSH I03.450.642.845.787.500 – skiing
- MeSH I03.450.642.845.800 – soccer
- MeSH I03.450.642.845.869 – swimming
- MeSH I03.450.642.845.869.110 – diving
- MeSH I03.450.642.845.925 – track and field
- MeSH I03.450.642.845.940 – walking
- MeSH I03.450.642.845.950 – weight lifting
- MeSH I03.450.642.845.975 – wrestling
- MeSH I03.450.769 – relaxation
- MeSH I03.450.769.647 – rest

=== MeSH I03.883 – travel ===
- MeSH I03.883.420 – expeditions

=== MeSH I03.946 – work ===
- MeSH I03.946.900 – work schedule tolerance

The list continues at List of MeSH codes (J01).
