= List of MeSH codes (H01) =

The following is a list of "H" codes for Medical Subject Headings (MeSH), as defined by the United States National Library of Medicine (NLM).

This list continues the information at List of MeSH codes (G14). Codes following these are found at List of MeSH codes (I01). For other MeSH codes, see List of MeSH codes.

The source for this content is the set of 2006 MeSH Trees from the NLM.

== MeSH H01 – natural sciences ==
=== MeSH H01.091 – astronomy ===
- MeSH H01.091.800 – Solar System
- MeSH H01.091.800.550 – meteoroids
- MeSH H01.091.800.600 – minor planets
- MeSH H01.091.800.700 – planets
- MeSH H01.091.800.700.200 – Earth (planet)
- MeSH H01.091.800.700.200.500 – Moon
- MeSH H01.091.800.700.412 – Jupiter
- MeSH H01.091.800.700.625 – Mars
- MeSH H01.091.800.700.762 – Mercury (planet)
- MeSH H01.091.800.700.796 – Neptune
- MeSH H01.091.800.700.813 – Pluto
- MeSH H01.091.800.700.831 – Saturn
- MeSH H01.091.800.700.865 – Uranus
- MeSH H01.091.800.700.900 – Venus
- MeSH H01.091.800.850 – Solar activity

=== MeSH H01.158 – biological sciences ===
- MeSH H01.158.100 – anatomy
- MeSH H01.158.100.091 – artistic anatomy
- MeSH H01.158.100.154 – comparative anatomy
- MeSH H01.158.100.185 – cross-sectional anatomy
- MeSH H01.158.100.185.900 – visible human project
- MeSH H01.158.100.216 – regional anatomy
- MeSH H01.158.100.279 – veterinary anatomy
- MeSH H01.158.100.433 – cytology
- MeSH H01.158.100.529 – embryology
- MeSH H01.158.100.529.500 – teratology
- MeSH H01.158.100.656 – histology
- MeSH H01.158.100.656.469 – comparative histology
- MeSH H01.158.100.700 – neuroanatomy
- MeSH H01.158.201 – biochemistry
- MeSH H01.158.201.344 – histocytochemistry
- MeSH H01.158.201.344.512 – immunohistochemistry
- MeSH H01.158.201.486 – immunochemistry
- MeSH H01.158.201.486.512 – immunohistochemistry
- MeSH H01.158.201.687 – neurochemistry
- MeSH H01.158.273 – biology
- MeSH H01.158.273.118 – botany
- MeSH H01.158.273.118.299 – ethnobotany
- MeSH H01.158.273.118.598 – pharmacognosy
- MeSH H01.158.273.180 – computational biology
- MeSH H01.158.273.180.800 – systems biology
- MeSH H01.158.273.200 – developmental biology
- MeSH H01.158.273.200.350 – embryology
- MeSH H01.158.273.200.350.500 – teratology
- MeSH H01.158.273.248 – ecology
- MeSH H01.158.273.295 – exobiology
- MeSH H01.158.273.343 – genetics
- MeSH H01.158.273.343.180 – cytogenetics
- MeSH H01.158.273.343.249 – genetic research
- MeSH H01.158.273.343.249.400 – Human Genome Project
- MeSH H01.158.273.343.290 – behavioral genetics
- MeSH H01.158.273.343.290.400 – genetic determinism
- MeSH H01.158.273.343.315 – medical genetics
- MeSH H01.158.273.343.315.368 – eugenics
- MeSH H01.158.273.343.315.400 – genetic services
- MeSH H01.158.273.343.315.400.400 – genetic counseling
- MeSH H01.158.273.343.315.400.430 – genetic screening
- MeSH H01.158.273.343.330 – microbial genetics
- MeSH H01.158.273.343.335 – population genetics
- MeSH H01.158.273.343.350 – genomics
- MeSH H01.158.273.343.350.700 – proteomics
- MeSH H01.158.273.343.420 – immunogenetics
- MeSH H01.158.273.343.595 – molecular biology
- MeSH H01.158.273.343.595.300 – molecular epidemiology
- MeSH H01.158.273.343.750 – pharmacogenetics
- MeSH H01.158.273.343.750.850 – toxicogenetics
- MeSH H01.158.273.343.800 – radiation genetics
- MeSH H01.158.273.368 – laboratory animal science
- MeSH H01.158.273.476 – marine biology
- MeSH H01.158.273.540 – microbiology
- MeSH H01.158.273.540.177 – bacteriology
- MeSH H01.158.273.540.274 – environmental microbiology
- MeSH H01.158.273.540.274.110 – air microbiology
- MeSH H01.158.273.540.274.332 – food microbiology
- MeSH H01.158.273.540.274.555 – soil microbiology
- MeSH H01.158.273.540.274.777 – water microbiology
- MeSH H01.158.273.540.460 – industrial microbiology
- MeSH H01.158.273.540.553 – mycology
- MeSH H01.158.273.540.859 – virology
- MeSH H01.158.273.595 – molecular biology
- MeSH H01.158.273.595.300 – molecular epidemiology
- MeSH H01.158.273.602 – natural history
- MeSH H01.158.273.610 – neurobiology
- MeSH H01.158.273.688 – parasitology
- MeSH H01.158.273.688.500 – food parasitology
- MeSH H01.158.273.688.750 – parasitic sensitivity tests
- MeSH H01.158.273.738 – photobiology
- MeSH H01.158.273.789 – radiobiology
- MeSH H01.158.273.943 – zoology
- MeSH H01.158.273.943.409 – entomology
- MeSH H01.158.344 – biophysics
- MeSH H01.158.344.310 – bionics
- MeSH H01.158.344.528 – electrophysiology
- MeSH H01.158.344.552 – hemorheology
- MeSH H01.158.550 – biotechnology
- MeSH H01.158.550.100 – biomimetics
- MeSH H01.158.610 – neurosciences
- MeSH H01.158.610.060 – neuroanatomy
- MeSH H01.158.610.080 – neurobiology
- MeSH H01.158.610.110 – neurochemistry
- MeSH H01.158.610.160 – neuroendocrinology
- MeSH H01.158.610.208 – neuropharmacology
- MeSH H01.158.610.268 – neurophysiology
- MeSH H01.158.703 – pharmacology
- MeSH H01.158.703.015 – ethnopharmacology
- MeSH H01.158.703.030 – neuropharmacology
- MeSH H01.158.703.045 – pharmacoepidemiology
- MeSH H01.158.703.052 – pharmacogenetics
- MeSH H01.158.703.052.850 – toxicogenetics
- MeSH H01.158.703.060 – pharmacognosy
- MeSH H01.158.703.152 – clinical pharmacology
- MeSH H01.158.703.546 – psychopharmacology
- MeSH H01.158.703.795 – toxicology
- MeSH H01.158.703.795.850 – toxicogenetics
- MeSH H01.158.782 – physiology
- MeSH H01.158.782.236 – electrophysiology
- MeSH H01.158.782.323 – endocrinology
- MeSH H01.158.782.323.200 – neuroendocrinology
- MeSH H01.158.782.562 – neurophysiology
- MeSH H01.158.782.688 – comparative physiology
- MeSH H01.158.782.795 – psychophysiology
- MeSH H01.158.782.795.110 – neuropsychology
- MeSH H01.158.782.795.180 – psychoneuroimmunology

=== MeSH H01.181 – chemistry ===
- MeSH H01.181.122 – biochemistry
- MeSH H01.181.122.249 – catalysis
- MeSH H01.181.122.768 – structure-activity relationship
- MeSH H01.181.122.768.500 – quantitative structure-activity relationship
- MeSH H01.181.216 – agricultural chemistry
- MeSH H01.181.216.652 – maillard reaction
- MeSH H01.181.278 – analytical chemistry
- MeSH H01.181.278.414 – electrophoresis
- MeSH H01.181.278.550 – immunochemistry
- MeSH H01.181.341 – clinical chemistry
- MeSH H01.181.370 – inorganic chemistry
- MeSH H01.181.370.310 – bioinorganic chemistry
- MeSH H01.181.404 – organic chemistry
- MeSH H01.181.404.095 – acylation
- MeSH H01.181.404.095.052 – acetylation
- MeSH H01.181.404.095.526 – aminoacylation
- MeSH H01.181.404.095.526.860 – transfer rna aminoacylation
- MeSH H01.181.404.146 – alkylation
- MeSH H01.181.404.146.538 – methylation
- MeSH H01.181.404.146.538.161 – dna methylation
- MeSH H01.181.404.190 – amination
- MeSH H01.181.404.325 – cyclization
- MeSH H01.181.404.371 – dealkylation
- MeSH H01.181.404.413 – deamination
- MeSH H01.181.404.454 – decarboxylation
- MeSH H01.181.404.475 – esterification
- MeSH H01.181.404.495 – glycosylation
- MeSH H01.181.404.600 – hydrogenation
- MeSH H01.181.404.643 – hydroxylation
- MeSH H01.181.404.705 – isomerism
- MeSH H01.181.404.705.682 – stereoisomerism
- MeSH H01.181.404.742 – nitrosation
- MeSH H01.181.404.780 – phosphorylation
- MeSH H01.181.466 – pharmaceutical chemistry
- MeSH H01.181.466.350 – drug design
- MeSH H01.181.466.685 – structure-activity relationship
- MeSH H01.181.466.685.500 – quantitative structure-activity relationship
- MeSH H01.181.529 – physical chemistry
- MeSH H01.181.529.023 – absorption
- MeSH H01.181.529.047 – adsorption
- MeSH H01.181.529.065 – air ionization
- MeSH H01.181.529.105 – anisotropy
- MeSH H01.181.529.145 – catalysis
- MeSH H01.181.529.183 – colloids
- MeSH H01.181.529.183.500 – micelles
- MeSH H01.181.529.205 – corrosion
- MeSH H01.181.529.225 – crystallization
- MeSH H01.181.529.240 – crystallography
- MeSH H01.181.529.240.555 – neutron diffraction
- MeSH H01.181.529.240.711 – powder diffraction
- MeSH H01.181.529.240.742 – x-ray diffraction
- MeSH H01.181.529.240.742.225 – x-ray crystallography
- MeSH H01.181.529.260 – desiccation
- MeSH H01.181.529.272 – dialysis
- MeSH H01.181.529.289 – dimerization
- MeSH H01.181.529.307 – electrochemistry
- MeSH H01.181.529.307.180 – conductometry
- MeSH H01.181.529.307.365 – electrolysis
- MeSH H01.181.529.307.365.348 – electroplating
- MeSH H01.181.529.307.437 – electrophoresis
- MeSH H01.181.529.307.437.100 – agar gel electrophoresis
- MeSH H01.181.529.307.437.100.150 – comet assay
- MeSH H01.181.529.307.437.190 – capillary electrophoresis
- MeSH H01.181.529.307.437.200 – cellulose acetate electrophoresis
- MeSH H01.181.529.307.437.220 – electrophoresis, gel, pulsed-field
- MeSH H01.181.529.307.437.230 – electrophoresis, gel, two-dimensional
- MeSH H01.181.529.307.437.236 – paper electrophoresis
- MeSH H01.181.529.307.437.319 – polyacrylamide gel electrophoresis
- MeSH H01.181.529.307.437.319.403 – disc electrophoresis
- MeSH H01.181.529.307.437.319.450 – electrophoresis, gel, two-dimensional
- MeSH H01.181.529.307.437.402 – starch gel electrophoresis
- MeSH H01.181.529.307.437.568 – immunoelectrophoresis
- MeSH H01.181.529.307.437.568.250 – counterimmunoelectrophoresis
- MeSH H01.181.529.307.437.568.520 – two-dimensional immunoelectrophoresis
- MeSH H01.181.529.307.437.575 – iontophoresis
- MeSH H01.181.529.307.437.663 – isoelectric focusing
- MeSH H01.181.529.307.719 – polarography
- MeSH H01.181.529.307.794 – potentiometry
- MeSH H01.181.529.328 – energy transfer
- MeSH H01.181.529.328.400 – linear energy transfer
- MeSH H01.181.529.365 – filtration
- MeSH H01.181.529.365.541 – micropore filters
- MeSH H01.181.529.365.807 – ultrafiltration
- MeSH H01.181.529.365.807.300 – hemofiltration
- MeSH H01.181.529.365.807.300.300 – hemodiafiltration
- MeSH H01.181.529.400 – hydrogen bonding
- MeSH H01.181.529.428 – hydrogen-ion concentration
- MeSH H01.181.529.428.176 – acid-base equilibrium
- MeSH H01.181.529.428.500 – isoelectric point
- MeSH H01.181.529.444 – hydrolysis
- MeSH H01.181.529.450 – hydrophobicity
- MeSH H01.181.529.479 – ion exchange
- MeSH H01.181.529.520 – maillard reaction
- MeSH H01.181.529.570 – molecular structure
- MeSH H01.181.529.570.500 – molecular conformation
- MeSH H01.181.529.574 – molecular weight
- MeSH H01.181.529.623 – osmolar concentration
- MeSH H01.181.529.641 – oxidation-reduction
- MeSH H01.181.529.665 – particle size
- MeSH H01.181.529.687 – permeability
- MeSH H01.181.529.687.495 – osmosis
- MeSH H01.181.529.687.661 – osmotic pressure
- MeSH H01.181.529.699 – phase transition
- MeSH H01.181.529.711 – photochemistry
- MeSH H01.181.529.711.200 – photobleaching
- MeSH H01.181.529.711.480 – photolysis
- MeSH H01.181.529.711.605 – photophosphorylation
- MeSH H01.181.529.711.730 – photosynthesis
- MeSH H01.181.529.741 – precipitation
- MeSH H01.181.529.741.347 – flocculation
- MeSH H01.181.529.741.519 – fractional precipitation
- MeSH H01.181.529.750 – proton-motive force
- MeSH H01.181.529.776 – radiochemistry
- MeSH H01.181.529.827 – solubility
- MeSH H01.181.529.845 – specific gravity
- MeSH H01.181.529.860 – spontaneous combustion
- MeSH H01.181.529.875 – surface properties
- MeSH H01.181.529.875.139 – adhesiveness
- MeSH H01.181.529.875.327 – capillarity
- MeSH H01.181.529.875.816 – surface tension
- MeSH H01.181.529.875.908 – wettability
- MeSH H01.181.529.934 – viscosity
- MeSH H01.181.529.952 – volatilization
- MeSH H01.181.650 – microchemistry

=== MeSH H01.288 – electronics ===
- MeSH H01.288.110 – amplifiers
- MeSH H01.288.319 – medical electronics
- MeSH H01.288.643 – robotics
- MeSH H01.288.745 – semiconductors
- MeSH H01.288.745.714 – transistors
- MeSH H01.288.878 – transducers
- MeSH H01.288.878.901 – pressure transducers

=== MeSH H01.374 – geography ===
- MeSH H01.374.572 – oceanography
- MeSH H01.374.572.400 – geologic sediments
- MeSH H01.374.786 – medical topography

=== MeSH H01.419 – geology ===
- MeSH H01.419.400 – geologic sediments

=== MeSH H01.548 – mathematics ===
- MeSH H01.548.035 – algorithms
- MeSH H01.548.350 – finite element analysis
- MeSH H01.548.386 – fourier analysis
- MeSH H01.548.438 – fractals
- MeSH H01.548.490 – game theory
- MeSH H01.548.490.356 – experimental games
- MeSH H01.548.635 – mathematical computing
- MeSH H01.548.635.310 – decision support techniques
- MeSH H01.548.635.310.290 – statistical data interpretation
- MeSH H01.548.635.310.308 – decision theory
- MeSH H01.548.635.310.308.310 – decision trees
- MeSH H01.548.635.310.500 – neural networks (computer)
- MeSH H01.548.635.310.525 – nomograms
- MeSH H01.548.675 – nonlinear dynamics
- MeSH H01.548.832 – statistics
- MeSH H01.548.832.067 – actuarial analysis
- MeSH H01.548.832.067.500 – life tables
- MeSH H01.548.832.067.500.700 – quality-adjusted life years
- MeSH H01.548.832.128 – analysis of variance
- MeSH H01.548.832.128.500 – multivariate analysis
- MeSH H01.548.832.160 – biometry
- MeSH H01.548.832.266 – cluster analysis
- MeSH H01.548.832.266.675 – small-area analysis
- MeSH H01.548.832.266.750 – space-time clustering
- MeSH H01.548.832.292 – confidence intervals
- MeSH H01.548.832.319 – statistical data interpretation
- MeSH H01.548.832.346 – discriminant analysis
- MeSH H01.548.832.373 – statistical factor analysis
- MeSH H01.548.832.475 – matched-pair analysis
- MeSH H01.548.832.522 – monte carlo method
- MeSH H01.548.832.650 – principal component analysis
- MeSH H01.548.832.672 – probability
- MeSH H01.548.832.672.137 – Bayes' theorem
- MeSH H01.548.832.672.289 – likelihood functions
- MeSH H01.548.832.672.442 – markov chains
- MeSH H01.548.832.672.471 – odds ratio
- MeSH H01.548.832.672.500 – predictive value of tests
- MeSH H01.548.832.672.617 – proportional hazards models
- MeSH H01.548.832.672.734 – risk
- MeSH H01.548.832.672.734.400 – logistic models
- MeSH H01.548.832.672.734.790 – risk assessment
- MeSH H01.548.832.672.734.800 – risk factors
- MeSH H01.548.832.672.867 – uncertainty
- MeSH H01.548.832.793 – regression analysis
- MeSH H01.548.832.793.400 – least-squares analysis
- MeSH H01.548.832.793.425 – linear models
- MeSH H01.548.832.793.450 – logistic models
- MeSH H01.548.832.793.725 – proportional hazards models
- MeSH H01.548.832.803 – roc curve
- MeSH H01.548.832.852 – sensitivity and specificity
- MeSH H01.548.832.901 – statistical distributions
- MeSH H01.548.832.901.250 – binomial distribution
- MeSH H01.548.832.901.300 – chi-square distribution
- MeSH H01.548.832.901.500 – normal distribution
- MeSH H01.548.832.901.750 – poisson distribution
- MeSH H01.548.832.925 – nonparametric statistics
- MeSH H01.548.832.950 – stochastic processes
- MeSH H01.548.832.950.500 – markov chains
- MeSH H01.548.832.975 – survival analysis
- MeSH H01.548.832.975.300 – disease-free survival

=== MeSH H01.603 – nanotechnology ===
- MeSH H01.603.600 – nanomedicine

=== MeSH H01.671 – physics ===
- MeSH H01.671.031 – acoustics
- MeSH H01.671.031.503 – psychoacoustics
- MeSH H01.671.031.675 – sound
- MeSH H01.671.031.675.567 – noise
- MeSH H01.671.031.849 – ultrasonics
- MeSH H01.671.031.849.550 – phonophoresis
- MeSH H01.671.031.849.675 – sonication
- MeSH H01.671.100 – biophysics
- MeSH H01.671.100.131 – biomechanics
- MeSH H01.671.100.131.200 – compressive strength
- MeSH H01.671.100.131.275 – elasticity
- MeSH H01.671.100.131.275.210 – compliance
- MeSH H01.671.100.131.310 – friction
- MeSH H01.671.100.131.375 – kinetics
- MeSH H01.671.100.131.400 – lifting
- MeSH H01.671.100.131.550 – pliability
- MeSH H01.671.100.131.625 – shear strength
- MeSH H01.671.100.131.700 – mechanical stress
- MeSH H01.671.100.131.800 – tensile strength
- MeSH H01.671.100.131.820 – torque
- MeSH H01.671.100.131.900 – vibration
- MeSH H01.671.100.131.925 – weight-bearing
- MeSH H01.671.100.202 – bionics
- MeSH H01.671.100.349 – diffusion
- MeSH H01.671.100.442 – energy transfer
- MeSH H01.671.100.442.400 – linear energy transfer
- MeSH H01.671.100.534 – filtration
- MeSH H01.671.100.534.807 – ultrafiltration
- MeSH H01.671.100.534.807.300 – hemofiltration
- MeSH H01.671.100.534.807.300.300 – hemodiafiltration
- MeSH H01.671.100.552 – hemorheology
- MeSH H01.671.100.708 – membrane potentials
- MeSH H01.671.150 – doppler effect
- MeSH H01.671.252 – electricity
- MeSH H01.671.252.270 – electric capacitance
- MeSH H01.671.252.277 – electric conductivity
- MeSH H01.671.252.277.350 – electric impedance
- MeSH H01.671.252.310 – electric wiring
- MeSH H01.671.252.402 – electrodes
- MeSH H01.671.252.528 – electromagnetics
- MeSH H01.671.252.528.400 – electromagnetic fields
- MeSH H01.671.252.550 – electrostatics
- MeSH H01.671.252.780 – power plants
- MeSH H01.671.323 – gravitation
- MeSH H01.671.323.369 – altered gravity
- MeSH H01.671.323.369.300 – hypergravity
- MeSH H01.671.323.369.400 – hypogravity
- MeSH H01.671.323.369.400.900 – weightlessness
- MeSH H01.671.347 – hardness
- MeSH H01.671.347.457 – hardness tests
- MeSH H01.671.368 – health physics
- MeSH H01.671.469 – lubrication
- MeSH H01.671.493 – magnetics
- MeSH H01.671.493.403 – electromagnetics
- MeSH H01.671.493.403.400 – electromagnetic fields
- MeSH H01.671.515 – mechanics
- MeSH H01.671.515.200 – compressive strength
- MeSH H01.671.515.275 – elasticity
- MeSH H01.671.515.275.210 – compliance
- MeSH H01.671.515.310 – friction
- MeSH H01.671.515.375 – kinetics
- MeSH H01.671.515.400 – lifting
- MeSH H01.671.515.550 – pliability
- MeSH H01.671.515.625 – shear strength
- MeSH H01.671.515.700 – mechanical stress
- MeSH H01.671.515.800 – tensile strength
- MeSH H01.671.515.820 – torque
- MeSH H01.671.515.900 – vibration
- MeSH H01.671.515.925 – weight-bearing
- MeSH H01.671.538 – motion
- MeSH H01.671.538.107 – acceleration
- MeSH H01.671.538.107.373 – deceleration
- MeSH H01.671.538.311 – coriolis force
- MeSH H01.671.538.703 – rotation
- MeSH H01.671.579 – nuclear physics
- MeSH H01.671.579.055 – alpha particles
- MeSH H01.671.579.182 – beta rays
- MeSH H01.671.579.372 – elementary particle interactions
- MeSH H01.671.579.404 – elementary particles
- MeSH H01.671.579.404.335 – electrons
- MeSH H01.671.579.404.467 – heavy ions
- MeSH H01.671.579.404.600 – mesons
- MeSH H01.671.579.404.645 – neutrons
- MeSH H01.671.579.404.645.368 – fast neutrons
- MeSH H01.671.579.404.705 – photons
- MeSH H01.671.579.404.765 – protons
- MeSH H01.671.579.580 – nuclear energy
- MeSH H01.671.579.580.485 – nuclear fission
- MeSH H01.671.579.580.652 – nuclear fusion
- MeSH H01.671.579.631 – magnetic resonance spectroscopy
- MeSH H01.671.579.631.240 – electron spin resonance spectroscopy
- MeSH H01.671.579.631.550 – biomolecular nuclear magnetic resonance
- MeSH H01.671.579.694 – nuclear reactors
- MeSH H01.671.579.705 – particle accelerators
- MeSH H01.671.579.705.250 – cyclotrons
- MeSH H01.671.579.705.700 – synchrotrons
- MeSH H01.671.579.800 – quantum theory
- MeSH H01.671.579.826 – radioactivity
- MeSH H01.671.579.835 – radionuclide generators
- MeSH H01.671.606 – optics
- MeSH H01.671.606.058 – anisotropy
- MeSH H01.671.606.116 – birefringence
- MeSH H01.671.606.400 – fiber optics
- MeSH H01.671.606.552 – light
- MeSH H01.671.606.552.199 – color
- MeSH H01.671.606.552.233 – darkness
- MeSH H01.671.606.552.333 – glare
- MeSH H01.671.606.552.440 – incandescence
- MeSH H01.671.606.552.548 – lasers
- MeSH H01.671.606.552.665 – luminescence
- MeSH H01.671.606.552.665.500 – fluorescence
- MeSH H01.671.606.552.782 – photons
- MeSH H01.671.606.624 – microscopy
- MeSH H01.671.606.714 – optical rotation
- MeSH H01.671.606.799 – photography
- MeSH H01.671.606.799.345 – holography
- MeSH H01.671.606.799.484 – image enhancement
- MeSH H01.671.606.799.484.802 – radiographic image enhancement
- MeSH H01.671.606.799.484.802.225 – digital subtraction angiography
- MeSH H01.671.606.799.484.802.440 – radiography, dental, digital
- MeSH H01.671.606.799.484.802.450 – dual-energy scanned projection radiography
- MeSH H01.671.606.799.484.802.935 – x-ray computed tomography
- MeSH H01.671.606.799.484.802.935.180 – computed tomographic colonography
- MeSH H01.671.606.799.484.802.935.800 – spiral computed tomography
- MeSH H01.671.606.799.484.901 – emission-computed tomography
- MeSH H01.671.606.799.484.901.500 – positron-emission tomography
- MeSH H01.671.606.799.700 – photofluorography
- MeSH H01.671.606.799.715 – photogrammetry
- MeSH H01.671.606.799.715.500 – moire topography
- MeSH H01.671.606.799.730 – photomicrography
- MeSH H01.671.606.805 – ocular refraction
- MeSH H01.671.606.811 – refractometry
- MeSH H01.671.628 – oscillometry
- MeSH H01.671.660 – phase transition
- MeSH H01.671.670 – porosity
- MeSH H01.671.691 – pressure
- MeSH H01.671.691.250 – decompression (physics)
- MeSH H01.671.691.250.500 – explosive decompression
- MeSH H01.671.691.352 – hydrostatic pressure
- MeSH H01.671.691.578 – osmotic pressure
- MeSH H01.671.691.714 – partial pressure
- MeSH H01.671.691.902 – vacuum
- MeSH H01.671.720 – psychophysics
- MeSH H01.671.720.628 – psychoacoustics
- MeSH H01.671.720.814 – signal detection (psychology)
- MeSH H01.671.768 – radiation
- MeSH H01.671.768.325 – electromagnetic fields
- MeSH H01.671.768.513 – ionizing radiation
- MeSH H01.671.768.513.055 – alpha particles
- MeSH H01.671.768.513.115 – background radiation
- MeSH H01.671.768.513.125 – beta rays
- MeSH H01.671.768.513.235 – cosmic radiation
- MeSH H01.671.768.513.400 – gamma rays
- MeSH H01.671.768.513.918 – x-rays
- MeSH H01.671.768.638 – nonionizing radiation
- MeSH H01.671.768.638.400 – high-energy shock waves
- MeSH H01.671.768.638.508 – infrared rays
- MeSH H01.671.768.638.578 – light
- MeSH H01.671.768.638.578.199 – color
- MeSH H01.671.768.638.578.233 – darkness
- MeSH H01.671.768.638.578.333 – glare
- MeSH H01.671.768.638.578.440 – incandescence
- MeSH H01.671.768.638.578.548 – lasers
- MeSH H01.671.768.638.578.665 – luminescence
- MeSH H01.671.768.638.578.665.500 – fluorescence
- MeSH H01.671.768.638.578.782 – photons
- MeSH H01.671.768.638.721 – radio waves
- MeSH H01.671.768.638.721.500 – microwaves
- MeSH H01.671.768.638.943 – ultraviolet rays
- MeSH H01.671.768.650 – radiation tolerance
- MeSH H01.671.768.765 – radiometry
- MeSH H01.671.768.765.488 – radiation dosage
- MeSH H01.671.768.765.488.392 – radiation dose-response relationship
- MeSH H01.671.768.765.588 – radiation monitoring
- MeSH H01.671.768.765.588.165 – body burden
- MeSH H01.671.768.765.588.379 – film dosimetry
- MeSH H01.671.768.765.588.852 – thermoluminescent dosimetry
- MeSH H01.671.768.765.710 – scintillation counting
- MeSH H01.671.768.765.710.740 – whole-body counting
- MeSH H01.671.768.765.826 – gamma spectrometry
- MeSH H01.671.768.831 – radiation scattering
- MeSH H01.671.768.831.860 – raman spectrum analysis
- MeSH H01.671.799 – rheology
- MeSH H01.671.799.193 – hemorheology
- MeSH H01.671.799.387 – laser-doppler flowmetry
- MeSH H01.671.799.581 – microfluidics
- MeSH H01.671.799.775 – pulsatile flow
- MeSH H01.671.868 – temperature
- MeSH H01.671.868.272 – cold
- MeSH H01.671.868.272.437 – freezing
- MeSH H01.671.868.543 – heat
- MeSH H01.671.868.850 – transition temperature
- MeSH H01.671.891 – thermal conductivity
- MeSH H01.671.912 – thermodynamics
- MeSH H01.671.912.230 – convection
- MeSH H01.671.912.345 – entropy
- MeSH H01.671.912.460 – heat

=== MeSH H01.770 – science ===
- MeSH H01.770.035 – algorithms
- MeSH H01.770.202 – knowledge
- MeSH H01.770.370 – methods
- MeSH H01.770.461 – theoretical models
- MeSH H01.770.461.125 – fractals
- MeSH H01.770.461.250 – fuzzy logic
- MeSH H01.770.461.395 – biological models
- MeSH H01.770.461.395.080 – animal disease models
- MeSH H01.770.461.395.161 – cardiovascular models
- MeSH H01.770.461.395.397 – genetic models
- MeSH H01.770.461.395.500 – immunological models
- MeSH H01.770.461.395.642 – neurological models
- MeSH H01.770.461.395.642.550 – neurolinguistic programming
- MeSH H01.770.461.495 – chemical models
- MeSH H01.770.461.545 – educational models
- MeSH H01.770.461.595 – molecular models
- MeSH H01.770.461.645 – nursing models
- MeSH H01.770.461.670 – organizational models
- MeSH H01.770.461.695 – psychological models
- MeSH H01.770.461.695.550 – neurolinguistic programming
- MeSH H01.770.461.835 – statistical models
- MeSH H01.770.461.835.500 – likelihood functions
- MeSH H01.770.461.835.750 – linear models
- MeSH H01.770.461.835.875 – logistic models
- MeSH H01.770.461.835.890 – economic models
- MeSH H01.770.461.835.890.500 – econometric models
- MeSH H01.770.461.835.895 – nomograms
- MeSH H01.770.461.835.900 – proportional hazards models
- MeSH H01.770.461.850 – nonlinear dynamics
- MeSH H01.770.552 – natural history
- MeSH H01.770.644 – research
- MeSH H01.770.644.108 – behavioral research
- MeSH H01.770.644.145 – biomedical research
- MeSH H01.770.644.145.100 – animal experimentation
- MeSH H01.770.644.145.100.100 – animal use alternatives
- MeSH H01.770.644.145.100.100.100 – animal testing alternatives
- MeSH H01.770.644.145.250 – embryo research
- MeSH H01.770.644.145.250.750 – research embryo creation
- MeSH H01.770.644.145.300 – fetal research
- MeSH H01.770.644.145.350 – genetic research
- MeSH H01.770.644.145.350.500 – Human Genome Project
- MeSH H01.770.644.145.500 – human experimentation
- MeSH H01.770.644.145.500.100 – autoexperimentation
- MeSH H01.770.644.145.500.750 – nontherapeutic human experimentation
- MeSH H01.770.644.145.500.875 – therapeutic human experimentation
- MeSH H01.770.644.241 – empirical research
- MeSH H01.770.644.241.800 – observation
- MeSH H01.770.644.241.850 – qualitative research
- MeSH H01.770.644.300 – feasibility studies
- MeSH H01.770.644.487 – research peer review
- MeSH H01.770.644.524 – pilot projects
- MeSH H01.770.644.601 – reproducibility of results
- MeSH H01.770.644.728 – research design
- MeSH H01.770.644.728.149 – control groups
- MeSH H01.770.644.728.300 – double-blind method
- MeSH H01.770.644.728.501 – meta-analysis
- MeSH H01.770.644.728.653 – patient selection
- MeSH H01.770.644.728.805 – random allocation
- MeSH H01.770.644.728.902 – sample size
- MeSH H01.770.727 – research support
- MeSH H01.770.787 – systems integration
- MeSH H01.770.808 – systems theory
- MeSH H01.770.878 – training support
- MeSH H01.770.878.276 – fellowships and scholarships

=== MeSH H01.862 – time ===
- MeSH H01.862.200 – chronology
- MeSH H01.862.405 – half-life
- MeSH H01.862.645 – periodicity
- MeSH H01.862.645.661 – seasons
- MeSH H01.862.675 – photoperiod
- MeSH H01.862.857 – time factors

=== MeSH H01.939 – weights and measures ===
- MeSH H01.939.155 – calibration
- MeSH H01.939.507 – international system of units
- MeSH H01.939.539 – metric system
- MeSH H01.939.808 – reference standards
- MeSH H01.939.810 – reference values

The list continues at List of MeSH codes (I01).
