= Islamic State and weapons of mass destruction =

The Islamic State (IS) has a history of creating or attempting to produce weapons of mass destruction (WMD). IS was the first ever non-state actor to combine chemical weapons with projectiles.

== Weapons of mass destruction ==
=== Chemical weapons ===
Stars and Stripes claimed that the Islamic State had used chemical weapons (CW) around 52 different times in Iraq and Syria from 2014 – 2017. IS deployed mustard gas and chlorine gas against forces of the Iraqi government, the former Ba'athist Syria government, the Syrian rebels and the Syrian Democratic Forces (SDF).

==== Obtaining chemical weapons ====
IS is believed to have obtained some of their chemical from abandoned stockpiles left over from Ba'athist Iraq and undeclared CW stockpiles from Syria.

Iraq had informed the United Nations (UN) in 2014 that IS had seized the Muthana State Establishment. The building was almost entirely destroyed and supervised by the United Nations Special Commission in Iraq after the Gulf War. The Facility contained around 2,500 sarin-filled explosives as of 1999. The UN claimed that that they were unable to be used by IS.

==== Chemical weapons program ====
The manufacturing of weapons and chemical weapons was controlled by the Committee of Military Development and Manufacturing (CMDM), which operates under the umbrella of IS's Department of Defence. The CMDM was given a monthly budget of $1 million and received additional funding for resources.

According to IS documents, over 1,000 employees worked on the CW project. IS developed and produced at least eight different chemicals for weapons, those being: aluminium phosphide, botulinum toxin, chlorine, cyanide ion, nicotine, ricin, thallium sulfate, and attempted the creation of anthrax.

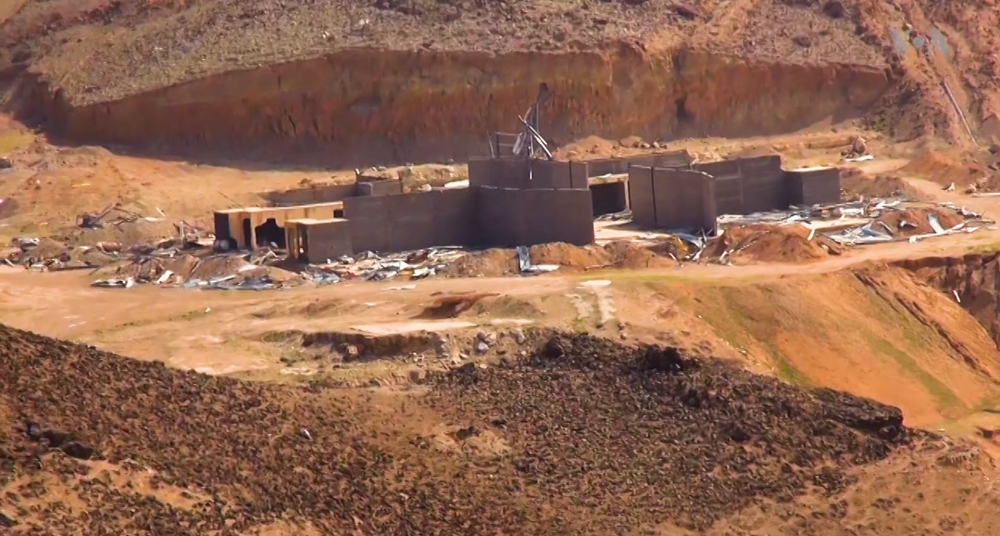
A destroyed Islamic State chemical weapons factory in Deir ez-Zor Governorate, Syria. 9 March 2017.

The United States and the UN confirmed that labs within the Mosul University had been used to make mustard gas. According to the UN, IS also had a research and development team in Mosul University, Anbar province, and Hawija, Kirkuk Governorate.

An IS chemical weapons factory (pictured) was uncovered and destroyed by the SDF on 9 March 2017. According to an SDF commander, the chemical weapons factory was built by the Syrian government and was expanded upon by IS.

IS used Chechens, Southeast Asians and former chemical weapons researchers for Al-Qaeda in Iraq and other Iraqi jihadist militants before the creation of IS.

=== Alleged dirty bomb plot ===
In July 2014, IS militants seized 88 pounds (40 kg) of uranium from the Mosul University. The material was non-enriched and so could only be used to build a "dirty bomb", spreading nuclear material to create a health hazard; it could not be used to build the type of nuclear bomb possessed by nuclear-capable nations.
