= Paleodontology =

Study of fossilized teeth and oral structures

Paleodontology is a specialised branch of paleontology focused on the study of fossilised teeth and oral structures.

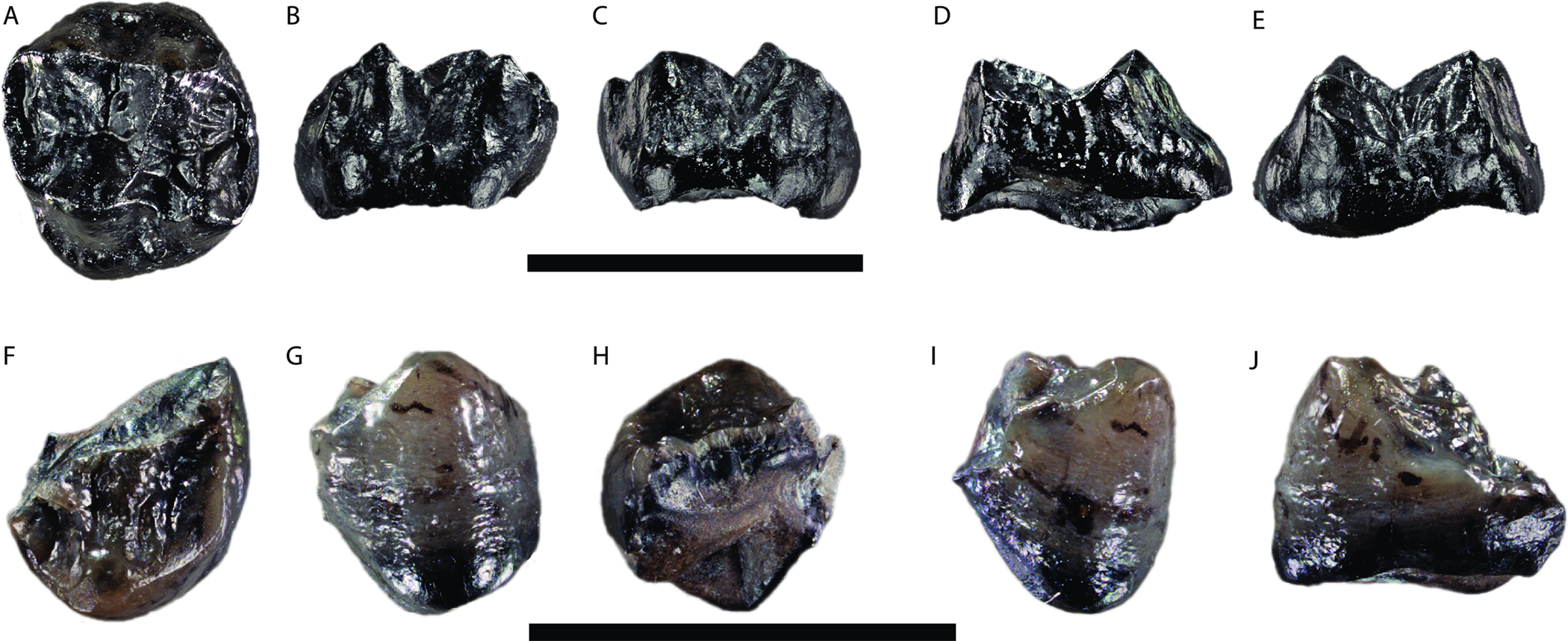
Fossilised teeth of hominid Buronius from Germany

Teeth, being the hardest structure in the body, are highly resistant to degradation from environmental factors and are often the best preserved remains of ancient lifeforms,, providing insight into the environmental habitat, migratory changes, pathology, oral habits and diet of ancient populations in addition to their genetic information such as heritable traits and genetic makeup.

== Etymology ==
The word paleodontology is derived from the Greek words palaios which means ancient, odontos which stands for tooth and logos which stands for study.

== History ==
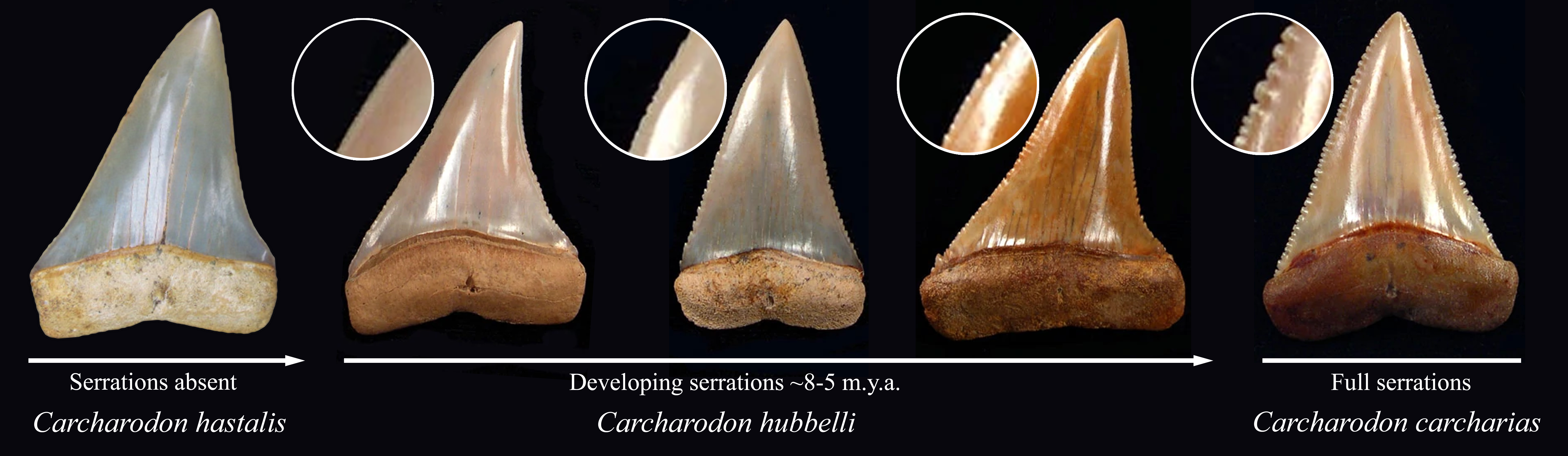
Evolution of shark teeth

The foundation of paleodontology can be traced back to the 17th century. Danish scientist Nicolaus Steno was dissecting a great white shark's head under the patronage of Grand Duke Ferdinando II when he recognised that the then popular triangular stones called glossopetrae used for antidotes to snake venoms, treatments of epilepsy and other remedies were actually ancient shark teeth based on the various observed similarities. Steno hypothesised that based on the corpuscular theory of matter, when teeth got buried in sediments, the dental corpuscles were replaced by mineral corpuscles, turning the teeth into stone. He published this explanation in the year 1669.

== Paleontological insights ==
Prevalence of dental remains indicates the geographic extent of ancient populations along with their growth trends. Regional genetic variations and gene flow can also be traced based on observed dental features and their spread.

Observations based on the structure, pattern of wear and chemistry of these remains also give information about the diet of prehistoric organisms, for example presence of sharp incisors among the dental remains indicate a carnivorous diet.

Estimating age based on dental remains is challenging. Methods include invasive procedures involving teeth procurement for assessment. However, these are unpopular given the rarity of fossil specimens and modern non invasive methods using radiography are often used.

Dental remains can also be used for gender determination based on sexual dimorphism.

Dental calculus preserves the proteins and genomic sequences of organisms that constituted the oral microbiome, DNA fragments from dietary constituents along with antibody elements of the host. This allows for the reconstruction of the ancient oral microbiome and pathology, establishing the probable hygienic and dietary habits based on paleopathological, calculus depositional and paleoproteomical analysis.

== IAPO ==
The International Association for Paleodontology (IAPO) was established in 2007 as a non profit organisation and seeks to promote paleodontological research. It also publishes the journal Bulletin of the International Association for Paleodontology.
