= Chemical terrorism =

Terrorism involving chemical agents

Chemical terrorism is the form of terrorism that uses the toxic effects of chemicals to kill, injure, or otherwise adversely affect the interests of its targets. It can broadly be considered a form of chemical warfare.

== Incidents ==
=== Use by LTTE in Sri Lanka ===
During the Sri Lankan Civil War, the Liberation Tigers of Tamil Eelam (LTTE) separatists were credited with the first non-state use of chemical weapons during their 1990 assault on the East Kiran base of the Sri Lanka Army using commercial chlorine gas. After that the LTTE used chemical weapons, including non-lethal CS gas, several times with mixed results, until its eventual military defeat in 2009. The LTTE claimed in 1986 that they have poisoned Sri Lankan Tea with potassium cyanide but no evidence of contamination was found. The LTTE was also accused of soaking knives in cyanide containing solutions and the use of landmines containing cyanide capsules.

=== Used by Hamas in Israel ===
According to a statement by CIA director George Tenet in 2000, Hamas has pursued a capability to conduct chemical terrorism. There have been reports of Hamas operatives planning and preparing attacks incorporating chemicals. In one case, nails and bolts packed into explosives detonated by a Hamas suicide bomber in a December 2001 attack at the Ben-Yehuda street in Jerusalem were soaked in rat poison. In another case, Hamas operative Abbas al-Sayyid received a large quantity of cyanide which he intended to insert into the explosive belts worn by suicide bombers.

=== Used by Aum Shinrikyo in Japan ===
On the morning of March 20, 1995, the Tokyo subway system was hit by synchronized chemical attacks on five trains. Using simple lunch-box-sized dispensers to release a mixture containing the military nerve agent sarin, members of the Aum Shinrikyo religious cult killed twelve people and injured about 5,000 others. The incident was unusual because the cult was using nerve gas that it had made in its own facilities; however, using unsophisticated means to disperse this low-quality agent, the attackers produced results less impressive than those achieved with ordinary explosives in the attacks on the Madrid and London transport systems in 2004 and 2005.

=== Used by al-Qaeda ===
Al Qaeda first started researching and experimenting with chemical weapons in 1997 in Afghanistan, testing phosgene, chlorine and hydrogen cyanide.

Al-Qaeda's interest in chemical weapons came to light following the success of Operation Viking Hammer during the 2003 invasion of Iraq. American intelligence personnel inspected the suspected chemical weapons site in Sargat and discovered traces of Ricin, as well as potassium chloride. They also discovered chemical weapons suits, atropine nerve gas antidotes, and manuals on manufacturing chemical weapons, lending credence to the idea that the site was related to the manufacture of chemical weapons and poisons.

CNN reported that during the Iraq War, al-Qaeda in Iraq launched a bombing campaign using chlorine gas from 21 October 2006 to June 2007, U.S. and Iraqi forces successfully destroyed much of al-Qaeda in Iraq's chemical weapons organisation.

=== Used by ISIS in Iraq and Syria ===
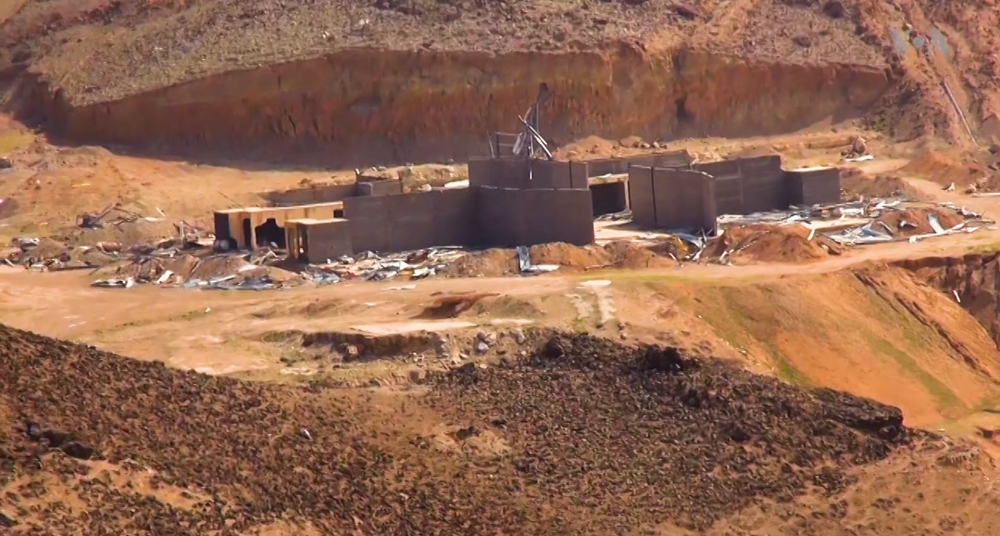
A destroyed ISIS chemical weapons factory in Deir ez-Zor Governorate, Syria. 9 March 2017.

ISIS are believed to have obtained chemical weapon components from left over Ba'athist Iraq stockpiles and banned and undeclared chemical weapon stockpiles from Syria. The group is believed to have formed a special unit for chemical weapons research; ISIS chemical possessions so far include chlorine and a low-grade sulphur mustard. The terrorist group have used chemical weapons against Iraqi and Syrian military personnel and civilians on several occasions:

- On 28 June 2015, according to the Kurdish YPG militia released a statement saying it ISIS had fired makeshift chemical projectiles at YPG positions and in the general area around the town of al-Hasakah during the Battle of al-Hasakah. They also fired chemical weapons at YPG positions around the town of Tel Brak, the gas used was possibly chlorine, gas masks were also found on the dead bodies of ISIL terrorists, the chemical attacks appeared to be test cases, ultimately these were the first confirmed case of a chemical attack by ISIS. The Syrian Observatory for Human Rights confirmed these reports, adding that there had been 12 cases of chemical poisoning among YPG units.
- In August 2015, 35 Kurdish fighters were wounded in a chemical attack whilst fighting ISIS terrorists near Erbil, a source from the OPCW (Organisation for the Prohibition of Chemical Weapons) said that laboratory tests revealed that mustard gas had been used. Also on August 21, ISIS launched a chemical attack on the town of Marea against women and children.
- On 12 March 2016, ISIS launched a chemical attack on the town of Taza in northern Iraq, wounding up to 600 people.
- The Telegraph reported that on 20 September 2016, Isis fired a shell at a US military base in Qayyarah, which tested positive for trace amounts of mustard gas, no one was hurt in the attack. Major General Joseph Dunford said at the time that although Isis’ chemical weapon capabilities were “rudimentary,” the incident was a “concerning development”.
- On 28 January 2017, the Guardian reported that during the Battle of Mosul, French and Iraqi special forces discovered a mustard chemical warfare agent in eastern Mosul alongside a cache of Russian surface-to-surface missiles.

Since at least January 2016, the coalition has been targeting Isis's chemical weapons infrastructure with airstrikes and special operations raids. On March 15, 2017, Stars and Stripes reported that the London-based intelligence and analysis service IHS Conflict Monitor said the previous year that ISIS has used chemical weapons at least 52 times in Iraq and Syria since 2014, including chlorine and sulfur mustard agents. About one-third of those attacks happened around Mosul. Pentagon officials confirmed that labs on the Mosul University campus, which was retaken from the militants in January 2017, had been used to make mustard agent.

== Countries with regular incidents ==
=== Thailand ===
Thailand has reports and under-reports on incidents of chemical terrorism in civilian areas or even usual urban areas at least since 2018. Thai government officials mostly deny the existences of the incidents in many cases involving covert devices embedded in buildings and vehicles, including some taxis. Some Cambodian spokespersons also accuse Thailand for covertly using chemical warfare.
