= List of MeSH codes (J01) =

The following is a partial list of the "J" codes for Medical Subject Headings (MeSH), as defined by the United States National Library of Medicine (NLM).

This list continues the information at List of MeSH codes (I03). Codes following these are found at List of MeSH codes (J02). For other MeSH codes, see List of MeSH codes.

The source for this content is the set of 2006 MeSH Trees from the NLM.

== MeSH J01 – technology, industry, and agriculture ==
=== MeSH J01.040 – agriculture ===
- MeSH J01.040.090 – animal husbandry
- MeSH J01.040.168 – aquaculture
- MeSH J01.040.168.300 – fisheries
- MeSH J01.040.246 – dairying
- MeSH J01.040.413 – gardening
- MeSH J01.040.581 – hydroponics

=== MeSH J01.086 – architecture ===
- MeSH J01.086.339 – facility design and construction
- MeSH J01.086.339.070 – architectural accessibility
- MeSH J01.086.339.115 – elevators and escalators
- MeSH J01.086.339.140 – floors and floor coverings
- MeSH J01.086.339.250 – hospital design and construction
- MeSH J01.086.339.290 – interior design and furnishings
- MeSH J01.086.339.400 – location directories and signs
- MeSH J01.086.339.490 – parking facilities

=== MeSH J01.219 – commerce ===
- MeSH J01.219.187 – commodification
- MeSH J01.219.375 – entrepreneurship
- MeSH J01.219.687 – marketing
- MeSH J01.219.687.274 – advertising
- MeSH J01.219.687.550 – marketing of health services
- MeSH J01.219.687.750 – social marketing

=== MeSH J01.293 – engineering ===
- MeSH J01.293.143 – biomedical engineering
- MeSH J01.293.257 – chemical engineering
- MeSH J01.293.556 – human engineering
- MeSH J01.293.556.441 – man-machine systems
- MeSH J01.293.821 – sanitary engineering

=== MeSH J01.494 – household articles ===
- MeSH J01.494.221 – bedding and linens
- MeSH J01.494.300 – cooking and eating utensils

=== MeSH J01.516 – household products ===
- MeSH J01.516.213 – cosmetics
- MeSH J01.516.381 – detergents
- MeSH J01.516.872 – soaps

=== MeSH J01.576 – industry ===
- MeSH J01.576.082 – barbering
- MeSH J01.576.112 – beauty culture
- MeSH J01.576.154 – book industry
- MeSH J01.576.154.400 – ink
- MeSH J01.576.154.600 – paper
- MeSH J01.576.207 – chemical industry
- MeSH J01.576.318 – drug industry
- MeSH J01.576.318.321 – drug packaging
- MeSH J01.576.318.321.400 – drug labeling
- MeSH J01.576.318.600 – orphan drug production
- MeSH J01.576.370 – extraction and processing industry
- MeSH J01.576.370.400 – metallurgy
- MeSH J01.576.370.400.900 – welding
- MeSH J01.576.370.500 – mining
- MeSH J01.576.370.500.500 – coal mining
- MeSH J01.576.423 – food industry
- MeSH J01.576.423.200 – food handling
- MeSH J01.576.423.200.200 – cookery
- MeSH J01.576.423.200.300 – cooking and eating utensils
- MeSH J01.576.423.200.350 – automatic food dispensers
- MeSH J01.576.423.200.375 – food packaging
- MeSH J01.576.423.200.400 – food-processing industry
- MeSH J01.576.423.200.700 – meat-packing industry
- MeSH J01.576.423.200.700.100 – abattoirs
- MeSH J01.576.423.500 – food services
- MeSH J01.576.423.500.300 – hospital food service
- MeSH J01.576.423.500.500 – menu planning
- MeSH J01.576.423.500.700 – restaurants
- MeSH J01.576.423.750 – food supply
- MeSH J01.576.423.850 – food technology
- MeSH J01.576.423.850.100 – food analysis
- MeSH J01.576.423.850.300 – food inspection
- MeSH J01.576.423.850.500 – food microbiology
- MeSH J01.576.423.850.600 – food packaging
- MeSH J01.576.423.850.600.400 – food labeling
- MeSH J01.576.423.850.650 – food parasitology
- MeSH J01.576.423.850.700 – food preservation
- MeSH J01.576.423.850.700.400 – food irradiation
- MeSH J01.576.423.850.700.600 – frozen foods
- MeSH J01.576.430 – forestry
- MeSH J01.576.489 – health care sector
- MeSH J01.576.549 – laundering
- MeSH J01.576.761 – product packaging
- MeSH J01.576.761.300 – drug packaging
- MeSH J01.576.761.300.400 – drug labeling
- MeSH J01.576.761.400 – food packaging
- MeSH J01.576.761.400.450 – food labeling
- MeSH J01.576.761.700 – product labeling
- MeSH J01.576.852 – tanning
- MeSH J01.576.885 – textile industry
- MeSH J01.576.885.800 – textiles
- MeSH J01.576.885.800.299 – cotton fiber
- MeSH J01.576.885.800.600 – nylons
- MeSH J01.576.885.800.800 – wool
- MeSH J01.576.919 – tobacco industry

=== MeSH J01.637 – manufactured materials ===
- MeSH J01.637.016 – adhesives
- MeSH J01.637.087 – biomimetic materials
- MeSH J01.637.087.500 – artificial membranes
- MeSH J01.637.087.500.510 – lipid bilayers
- MeSH J01.637.087.500.517 – liposomes
- MeSH J01.637.087.500.900 – virosomes
- MeSH J01.637.118 – cellophane
- MeSH J01.637.153 – ceramics
- MeSH J01.637.215 – clothing
- MeSH J01.637.215.600 – protective clothing
- MeSH J01.637.215.600.199 – ear protective devices
- MeSH J01.637.215.600.400 – protective gloves
- MeSH J01.637.215.600.400.400 – surgical gloves
- MeSH J01.637.215.600.700 – space suits
- MeSH J01.637.215.800 – shoes
- MeSH J01.637.241 – construction materials
- MeSH J01.637.241.400 – glass
- MeSH J01.637.241.900 – wood
- MeSH J01.637.370 – cooking and eating utensils
- MeSH J01.637.412 – elastomers
- MeSH J01.637.412.700 – polyurethanes
- MeSH J01.637.412.767 – rubber
- MeSH J01.637.412.767.480 – neoprene
- MeSH J01.637.412.900 – silicone elastomers
- MeSH J01.637.425 – firearms
- MeSH J01.637.450 – industrial oils
- MeSH J01.637.500 – ink
- MeSH J01.637.506 – liquid crystals
- MeSH J01.637.512 – nanostructures
- MeSH J01.637.512.500 – nanotubes
- MeSH J01.637.512.500.500 – nanotubes
- MeSH J01.637.512.500.750 – nanotubes
- MeSH J01.637.512.750 – quantum dots
- MeSH J01.637.548 – nylons
- MeSH J01.637.597 – paint
- MeSH J01.637.597.422 – lacquer
- MeSH J01.637.650 – paper
- MeSH J01.637.708 – protective devices
- MeSH J01.637.708.100 – air bags
- MeSH J01.637.708.250 – ear protective devices
- MeSH J01.637.708.260 – eye protective devices
- MeSH J01.637.708.380 – head protective devices
- MeSH J01.637.708.500 – masks
- MeSH J01.637.708.500.450 – laryngeal masks
- MeSH J01.637.708.520 – mouth protectors
- MeSH J01.637.708.600 – protective clothing
- MeSH J01.637.708.600.400 – protective gloves
- MeSH J01.637.708.600.400.400 – surgical gloves
- MeSH J01.637.708.600.700 – space suits
- MeSH J01.637.708.700 – respiratory protective devices
- MeSH J01.637.708.800 – seat belts
- MeSH J01.637.825 – sports equipment
- MeSH J01.637.883 – wool

=== MeSH J01.780 – power plants ===
- MeSH J01.780.600 – nuclear reactors

=== MeSH J01.897 – technology ===
- MeSH J01.897.104 – automation
- MeSH J01.897.104.834 – robotics
- MeSH J01.897.115 – biomedical technology
- MeSH J01.897.115.250 – biomedical enhancement
- MeSH J01.897.115.250.500 – genetic enhancement
- MeSH J01.897.115.625 – nanomedicine
- MeSH J01.897.120 – biotechnology
- MeSH J01.897.120.100 – biomimetics
- MeSH J01.897.120.115 – bioreactors
- MeSH J01.897.120.460 – industrial microbiology
- MeSH J01.897.280 – educational technology
- MeSH J01.897.280.500 – audiovisual aids
- MeSH J01.897.280.500.117 – illustrated books
- MeSH J01.897.280.500.269 – exhibits
- MeSH J01.897.280.500.426 – maps
- MeSH J01.897.280.500.480 – medical illustration
- MeSH J01.897.280.500.545 – structural models
- MeSH J01.897.280.500.545.129 – anatomic models
- MeSH J01.897.280.500.545.129.400 – manikins
- MeSH J01.897.280.500.545.129.800 – visible human project
- MeSH J01.897.280.500.598 – motion pictures
- MeSH J01.897.280.500.633 – multimedia
- MeSH J01.897.280.500.668 – optical storage devices
- MeSH J01.897.280.500.668.800 – videodisc recording
- MeSH J01.897.280.500.668.800.250 – compact disks
- MeSH J01.897.280.500.668.800.250.100 – cd-i
- MeSH J01.897.280.500.668.800.250.200 – cd-rom
- MeSH J01.897.280.500.739 – radio
- MeSH J01.897.280.500.846 – tape recording
- MeSH J01.897.280.500.846.734 – videotape recording
- MeSH J01.897.280.500.898 – television
- MeSH J01.897.280.500.898.475 – video microscopy
- MeSH J01.897.280.500.898.800 – videodisc recording
- MeSH J01.897.280.500.898.800.250 – compact disks
- MeSH J01.897.280.500.898.800.250.100 – cd-i
- MeSH J01.897.280.500.898.800.250.200 – cd-rom
- MeSH J01.897.280.500.898.840 – videotape recording
- MeSH J01.897.441 – man-machine systems
- MeSH J01.897.520 – miniaturization
- MeSH J01.897.520.600 – nanotechnology
- MeSH J01.897.520.600.500 – microfluidics
- MeSH J01.897.520.600.600 – nanomedicine
- MeSH J01.897.608 – quality control
- MeSH J01.897.724 – dental technology
- MeSH J01.897.780 – medical technology
- MeSH J01.897.836 – pharmaceutical technology
- MeSH J01.897.891 – radiologic technology
- MeSH J01.897.900 – technology transfer

=== MeSH J01.937 – transportation ===
- MeSH J01.937.285 – aviation
- MeSH J01.937.285.100 – aircraft
- MeSH J01.937.285.100.100 – air ambulances
- MeSH J01.937.285.850 – space flight
- MeSH J01.937.285.850.400 – extravehicular activity
- MeSH J01.937.285.850.900 – spacecraft
- MeSH J01.937.500 – motor vehicles
- MeSH J01.937.500.050 – ambulances
- MeSH J01.937.500.100 – automobiles
- MeSH J01.937.500.500 – motorcycles
- MeSH J01.937.500.600 – off-road motor vehicles
- MeSH J01.937.690 – railroads
- MeSH J01.937.817 – ships

The list continues at List of MeSH codes (J02).
