= List of MeSH codes (L01) =

The following is a list of "L" codes for Medical Subject Headings (MeSH), as defined by the United States National Library of Medicine (NLM).

This list continues the information at List of MeSH codes (K01). Codes following these are found at List of MeSH codes (M01). For other MeSH codes, see List of MeSH codes.

The source for this content is the set of 2006 MeSH Trees from the NLM.

== MeSH L01 – information science ==
=== MeSH L01.100 – classification ===
- MeSH L01.100.697 – phylogeny

=== MeSH L01.143 – communication ===
- MeSH L01.143.050 – advertising
- MeSH L01.143.140 – answering services
- MeSH L01.143.230 – communication barriers
- MeSH L01.143.256 – computer literacy
- MeSH L01.143.283 – cybernetics
- MeSH L01.143.283.425 – feedback
- MeSH L01.143.320 – diffusion of innovation
- MeSH L01.143.320.800 – technology transfer
- MeSH L01.143.380 – hotlines
- MeSH L01.143.443 – Information dissemination
- MeSH L01.143.474 – interdisciplinary communication
- MeSH L01.143.506 – language
- MeSH L01.143.506.423 – language arts
- MeSH L01.143.506.423.348 – lipreading
- MeSH L01.143.506.423.452 – multilingualism
- MeSH L01.143.506.423.557 – reading
- MeSH L01.143.506.423.676 – speech
- MeSH L01.143.506.423.796 – translating
- MeSH L01.143.506.423.906 – writing
- MeSH L01.143.506.423.906.215 – authorship
- MeSH L01.143.506.423.906.377 – correspondence
- MeSH L01.143.506.423.906.377.333 – electronic mail
- MeSH L01.143.506.423.906.539 – handwriting
- MeSH L01.143.506.423.906.539.500 – paleography
- MeSH L01.143.506.423.906.539.750 – shorthand
- MeSH L01.143.506.598 – linguistics
- MeSH L01.143.506.598.400 – terminology
- MeSH L01.143.506.598.400.556 – names
- MeSH L01.143.506.598.400.556.131 – abbreviations
- MeSH L01.143.506.598.400.556.283 – anonyms and pseudonyms
- MeSH L01.143.506.598.400.556.536 – eponyms
- MeSH L01.143.506.598.518 – phonetics
- MeSH L01.143.506.598.628 – psycholinguistics
- MeSH L01.143.506.598.628.550 – neurolinguistic programming
- MeSH L01.143.506.598.745 – semantics
- MeSH L01.143.506.598.901 – vocabulary
- MeSH L01.143.620 – negotiating
- MeSH L01.143.649 – nonverbal communication
- MeSH L01.143.649.526 – manual communication
- MeSH L01.143.649.526.668 – sign language
- MeSH L01.143.762 – persuasive communication
- MeSH L01.143.790 – propaganda
- MeSH L01.143.820 – reminder systems

=== MeSH L01.178 – communications media ===
- MeSH L01.178.362 – erotica
- MeSH L01.178.476 – library materials
- MeSH L01.178.590 – mass media
- MeSH L01.178.590.500 – motion pictures
- MeSH L01.178.590.700 – radio
- MeSH L01.178.590.875 – television
- MeSH L01.178.590.875.800 – videodisc recording
- MeSH L01.178.590.875.800.250 – compact disks
- MeSH L01.178.590.875.800.250.100 – CD-i
- MeSH L01.178.590.875.800.250.200 – CD-ROM
- MeSH L01.178.590.875.840 – videotape recording
- MeSH L01.178.682 – publications
- MeSH L01.178.682.099 – bibliography
- MeSH L01.178.682.099.183 – national bibliography
- MeSH L01.178.682.099.308 – bibliography of medicine
- MeSH L01.178.682.099.325 – bibliometrics
- MeSH L01.178.682.099.434 – biobibliography
- MeSH L01.178.682.150 – book reviews
- MeSH L01.178.682.192 – books
- MeSH L01.178.682.192.122 – book imprints
- MeSH L01.178.682.192.122.622 – printers' marks
- MeSH L01.178.682.192.178 – book ornamentation
- MeSH L01.178.682.192.234 – bookplates
- MeSH L01.178.682.192.289 – illustrated books
- MeSH L01.178.682.192.515 – incunabula
- MeSH L01.178.682.192.609 – manuals
- MeSH L01.178.682.192.609.666 – sex manuals
- MeSH L01.178.682.192.779 – rare books
- MeSH L01.178.682.192.836 – reference books
- MeSH L01.178.682.192.836.072 – almanacs
- MeSH L01.178.682.192.836.147 – atlases
- MeSH L01.178.682.192.836.285 – dictionaries
- MeSH L01.178.682.192.836.285.206 – chemical dictionaries
- MeSH L01.178.682.192.836.285.277 – classical dictionaries
- MeSH L01.178.682.192.836.285.348 – dental dictionaries
- MeSH L01.178.682.192.836.285.419 – medical dictionaries
- MeSH L01.178.682.192.836.285.490 – pharmaceutic dictionaries
- MeSH L01.178.682.192.836.285.561 – polyglot dictionaries
- MeSH L01.178.682.192.836.339 – directories
- MeSH L01.178.682.192.836.390 – dispensatories
- MeSH L01.178.682.192.836.456 – encyclopedias
- MeSH L01.178.682.192.836.535 – formularies
- MeSH L01.178.682.192.836.535.310 – dental formularies
- MeSH L01.178.682.192.836.535.435 – homeopathic formularies
- MeSH L01.178.682.192.836.535.561 – hospital formularies
- MeSH L01.178.682.192.836.749 – pharmacopoeias
- MeSH L01.178.682.192.836.749.599 – homeopathic pharmacopoeias
- MeSH L01.178.682.192.836.842 – medical reference books
- MeSH L01.178.682.192.836.842.385 – medical dictionaries
- MeSH L01.178.682.192.900 – textbooks
- MeSH L01.178.682.236 – broadsides
- MeSH L01.178.682.290 – catalogs
- MeSH L01.178.682.290.183 – commercial catalogs
- MeSH L01.178.682.290.183.249 – booksellers' catalogs
- MeSH L01.178.682.290.183.416 – publishers' catalogs
- MeSH L01.178.682.290.283 – drug catalogs
- MeSH L01.178.682.290.383 – library catalogs
- MeSH L01.178.682.290.483 – union catalogs
- MeSH L01.178.682.389 – academic dissertations
- MeSH L01.178.682.492 – government publications
- MeSH L01.178.682.608 – manuscripts
- MeSH L01.178.682.608.526 – medical manuscripts
- MeSH L01.178.682.707 – pamphlets
- MeSH L01.178.682.759 – review literature
- MeSH L01.178.682.759.150 – consensus development conferences
- MeSH L01.178.682.759.150.500 – nih consensus development conferences
- MeSH L01.178.682.829 – serial publications
- MeSH L01.178.682.829.481 – newspapers
- MeSH L01.178.682.829.678 – periodicals
- MeSH L01.178.682.920 – translations
- MeSH L01.178.820 – teaching materials
- MeSH L01.178.820.090 – audiovisual aids
- MeSH L01.178.820.090.269 – exhibits
- MeSH L01.178.820.090.426 – maps
- MeSH L01.178.820.090.480 – medical illustration
- MeSH L01.178.820.090.545 – structural models
- MeSH L01.178.820.090.545.129 – anatomic models
- MeSH L01.178.820.090.545.129.400 – manikins
- MeSH L01.178.820.090.545.129.800 – visible human project
- MeSH L01.178.820.090.598 – motion pictures
- MeSH L01.178.820.090.633 – multimedia
- MeSH L01.178.820.090.668 – optical storage devices
- MeSH L01.178.820.090.668.800 – videodisc recording
- MeSH L01.178.820.090.668.800.250 – compact disks
- MeSH L01.178.820.090.668.800.250.100 – CD-i
- MeSH L01.178.820.090.668.800.250.200 – CD-ROM
- MeSH L01.178.820.090.739 – radio
- MeSH L01.178.820.090.846 – tape recording
- MeSH L01.178.820.090.846.734 – videotape recording
- MeSH L01.178.820.090.898 – television
- MeSH L01.178.820.090.898.475 – video microscopy
- MeSH L01.178.820.090.898.800 – videodisc recording
- MeSH L01.178.820.090.898.800.250 – compact disks
- MeSH L01.178.820.090.898.800.250.100 – CD-i
- MeSH L01.178.820.090.898.800.250.200 – CD-ROM
- MeSH L01.178.820.090.898.840 – videotape recording
- MeSH L01.178.820.500 – manuals
- MeSH L01.178.820.500.666 – sex manuals
- MeSH L01.178.820.900 – textbooks
- MeSH L01.178.847 – telecommunications
- MeSH L01.178.847.249 – electronic mail
- MeSH L01.178.847.500 – radar
- MeSH L01.178.847.514 – radio
- MeSH L01.178.847.550 – satellite communications
- MeSH L01.178.847.606 – telefacsimile
- MeSH L01.178.847.652 – telemedicine
- MeSH L01.178.847.652.550 – remote consultation
- MeSH L01.178.847.652.600 – telepathology
- MeSH L01.178.847.652.700 – teleradiology
- MeSH L01.178.847.698 – telephone
- MeSH L01.178.847.698.249 – answering services
- MeSH L01.178.847.698.300 – cellular phone
- MeSH L01.178.847.698.500 – modems
- MeSH L01.178.847.823 – television
- MeSH L01.178.847.823.475 – video microscopy
- MeSH L01.178.847.900 – videoconferencing

=== MeSH L01.224 – computing methodologies ===
- MeSH L01.224.050 – algorithms
- MeSH L01.224.065 – artificial intelligence
- MeSH L01.224.065.190 – expert systems
- MeSH L01.224.065.250 – fuzzy logic
- MeSH L01.224.065.480 – knowledge bases
- MeSH L01.224.065.580 – natural language processing
- MeSH L01.224.065.605 – neural networks (computer)
- MeSH L01.224.065.630 – robotics
- MeSH L01.224.085 – automatic data processing
- MeSH L01.224.085.800 – punched-card systems
- MeSH L01.224.108 – computer graphics
- MeSH L01.224.108.150 – computer-aided design
- MeSH L01.224.160 – computer simulation
- MeSH L01.224.230 – computer systems
- MeSH L01.224.230.110 – computer communication networks
- MeSH L01.224.230.110.500 – internet
- MeSH L01.224.230.110.600 – local area networks
- MeSH L01.224.230.260 – computers
- MeSH L01.224.230.260.115 – computer peripherals
- MeSH L01.224.230.260.115.475 – computer storage devices
- MeSH L01.224.230.260.115.475.600 – optical storage devices
- MeSH L01.224.230.260.115.475.600.325 – compact disks
- MeSH L01.224.230.260.115.475.600.325.500 – CD-i
- MeSH L01.224.230.260.115.475.600.325.750 – CD-ROM
- MeSH L01.224.230.260.115.500 – computer terminals
- MeSH L01.224.230.260.115.750 – modems
- MeSH L01.224.230.260.230 – analog computers
- MeSH L01.224.230.260.280 – hybrid computers
- MeSH L01.224.230.260.280.080 – analog-to-digital conversion
- MeSH L01.224.230.260.308 – mainframe computers
- MeSH L01.224.230.260.315 – molecular computers
- MeSH L01.224.230.260.550 – microcomputers
- MeSH L01.224.230.260.550.500 – handheld computers
- MeSH L01.224.230.260.580 – minicomputers
- MeSH L01.224.300 – molecular computers
- MeSH L01.224.308 – computer-assisted image processing
- MeSH L01.224.308.189 – data compression
- MeSH L01.224.308.380 – image enhancement
- MeSH L01.224.308.380.600 – radiographic image enhancement
- MeSH L01.224.308.380.800 – dual-energy scanned projection radiography
- MeSH L01.224.308.410 – three-dimensional imaging
- MeSH L01.224.680 – mathematical computing
- MeSH L01.224.680.310 – decision support techniques
- MeSH L01.224.680.310.380 – statistical data interpretation
- MeSH L01.224.680.310.428 – decision theory
- MeSH L01.224.680.310.480 – decision trees
- MeSH L01.224.680.310.600 – neural networks (computer)
- MeSH L01.224.680.310.625 – nomograms
- MeSH L01.224.680.700 – computer-assisted numerical analysis
- MeSH L01.224.800 – computer-assisted signal processing
- MeSH L01.224.800.500 – data compression
- MeSH L01.224.900 – software
- MeSH L01.224.900.280 – database management systems
- MeSH L01.224.900.400 – grateful med
- MeSH L01.224.900.590 – hypermedia
- MeSH L01.224.900.780 – programming languages
- MeSH L01.224.900.820 – software design
- MeSH L01.224.900.868 – software validation
- MeSH L01.224.900.889 – speech recognition software
- MeSH L01.224.900.910 – user-computer interface
- MeSH L01.224.900.930 – video games
- MeSH L01.224.900.950 – word processing

=== MeSH L01.240 – copying processes ===
- MeSH L01.240.630 – microfilming
- MeSH L01.240.940 – tape recording
- MeSH L01.240.940.840 – videotape recording
- MeSH L01.240.950 – telefacsimile
- MeSH L01.240.960 – video recording
- MeSH L01.240.960.800 – videodisc recording
- MeSH L01.240.960.800.250 – compact disks
- MeSH L01.240.960.800.250.100 – CD-i
- MeSH L01.240.960.800.250.200 – CD-ROM
- MeSH L01.240.960.880 – videotape recording

=== MeSH L01.280 – data collection ===
- MeSH L01.280.360 – geriatric assessment
- MeSH L01.280.520 – interviews
- MeSH L01.280.520.200 – focus groups
- MeSH L01.280.660 – narration
- MeSH L01.280.800 – questionnaires
- MeSH L01.280.800.310 – delphi technique
- MeSH L01.280.900 – records
- MeSH L01.280.900.250 – birth certificates
- MeSH L01.280.900.350 – death certificates
- MeSH L01.280.900.375 – dental records
- MeSH L01.280.900.425 – hospital records
- MeSH L01.280.900.968 – medical records
- MeSH L01.280.900.968.500 – medical record linkage
- MeSH L01.280.900.968.750 – problem-oriented medical records
- MeSH L01.280.900.968.775 – computerized medical records systems
- MeSH L01.280.900.968.875 – trauma severity indices
- MeSH L01.280.900.968.875.125 – abbreviated injury scale
- MeSH L01.280.900.968.875.250 – glasgow coma scale
- MeSH L01.280.900.968.875.260 – glasgow outcome scale
- MeSH L01.280.900.968.875.500 – injury severity score
- MeSH L01.280.900.984 – nursing records
- MeSH L01.280.950 – registries
- MeSH L01.280.950.725 – seer program
- MeSH L01.280.975 – vital statistics
- MeSH L01.280.975.450 – life expectancy
- MeSH L01.280.975.475 – life tables
- MeSH L01.280.975.475.700 – quality-adjusted life years
- MeSH L01.280.975.525 – morbidity
- MeSH L01.280.975.525.080 – basic reproduction number
- MeSH L01.280.975.525.375 – incidence
- MeSH L01.280.975.525.750 – prevalence
- MeSH L01.280.975.550 – mortality
- MeSH L01.280.975.550.250 – cause of death
- MeSH L01.280.975.550.287 – child mortality
- MeSH L01.280.975.550.325 – fatal outcome
- MeSH L01.280.975.550.362 – fetal mortality
- MeSH L01.280.975.550.400 – hospital mortality
- MeSH L01.280.975.550.475 – infant mortality
- MeSH L01.280.975.550.500 – maternal mortality
- MeSH L01.280.975.550.900 – survival rate
- MeSH L01.280.975.775 – pregnancy rate
- MeSH L01.280.975.775.500 – birth rate

=== MeSH L01.296 – data display ===
- MeSH L01.296.110 – computer graphics
- MeSH L01.296.110.150 – computer-aided design

=== MeSH L01.313 – informatics ===
- MeSH L01.313.249 – dental informatics
- MeSH L01.313.500 – medical informatics
- MeSH L01.313.650 – nursing informatics
- MeSH L01.313.750 – public health informatics

=== MeSH L01.346 – information centers ===
- MeSH L01.346.208 – archives
- MeSH L01.346.596 – libraries
- MeSH L01.346.596.363 – dental libraries
- MeSH L01.346.596.413 – digital libraries
- MeSH L01.346.596.463 – hospital libraries
- MeSH L01.346.596.563 – medical libraries
- MeSH L01.346.596.563.725 – national library of medicine (u.s.)
- MeSH L01.346.596.663 – nursing libraries

=== MeSH L01.453 – information services ===
- MeSH L01.453.183 – bibliography
- MeSH L01.453.183.190 – descriptive bibliography
- MeSH L01.453.183.224 – bibliography of medicine
- MeSH L01.453.183.291 – bibliometrics
- MeSH L01.453.183.392 – biobibliography
- MeSH L01.453.183.544 – bibliographic databases
- MeSH L01.453.220 – book selection
- MeSH L01.453.245 – documentation
- MeSH L01.453.245.100 – abstracting and indexing
- MeSH L01.453.245.250 – cataloging
- MeSH L01.453.245.250.150 – book classification
- MeSH L01.453.245.275 – classification
- MeSH L01.453.245.390 – filing
- MeSH L01.453.245.667 – molecular sequence data
- MeSH L01.453.245.667.060 – amino acid sequence
- MeSH L01.453.245.667.080 – base sequence
- MeSH L01.453.245.667.160 – carbohydrate sequence
- MeSH L01.453.245.945 – controlled vocabulary
- MeSH L01.453.245.945.160 – Current Procedural Terminology
- MeSH L01.453.245.945.200 – diagnostic and statistical manual of mental disorders
- MeSH L01.453.245.945.380 – healthcare common procedure coding system
- MeSH L01.453.245.945.400 – International Classification of Disease
- MeSH L01.453.245.945.500 – Logical Observation Identifiers Names and Codes
- MeSH L01.453.245.945.700 – subject headings
- MeSH L01.453.245.945.700.500 – medical subject headings
- MeSH L01.453.245.945.720 – Systematized Nomenclature of Medicine
- MeSH L01.453.245.945.800 – Unified Medical Language System
- MeSH L01.453.270 – drug information services
- MeSH L01.453.270.120 – adverse drug reaction reporting systems
- MeSH L01.453.270.200 – clinical pharmacy information systems
- MeSH L01.453.450 – Human Genome Project
- MeSH L01.453.639 – library services
- MeSH L01.453.639.493 – interlibrary loans
- MeSH L01.453.819 – library technical services
- MeSH L01.453.819.250 – cataloging
- MeSH L01.453.819.250.150 – book classification

=== MeSH L01.470 – information storage and retrieval ===
- MeSH L01.470.500 – data compression
- MeSH L01.470.750 – databases
- MeSH L01.470.750.500 – bibliographic databases
- MeSH L01.470.750.500.650 – PubMed
- MeSH L01.470.750.500.650.500 – MEDLINE
- MeSH L01.470.750.750 – factual databases
- MeSH L01.470.750.750.325 – genetic databases
- MeSH L01.470.750.750.325.630 – nucleic acid databases
- MeSH L01.470.750.750.325.710 – protein databases
- MeSH L01.470.750.750.462 – geographic information systems
- MeSH L01.470.750.750.600 – national practitioner data bank
- MeSH L01.470.750.750.900 – visible human project

=== MeSH L01.583 – library science ===
- MeSH L01.583.363 – library administration
- MeSH L01.583.390 – library associations
- MeSH L01.583.400 – library automation
- MeSH L01.583.410 – library collection development
- MeSH L01.583.430 – library schools
- MeSH L01.583.464 – library services
- MeSH L01.583.464.493 – interlibrary loans
- MeSH L01.583.564 – library surveys
- MeSH L01.583.782 – library technical services

=== MeSH L01.700 – medical informatics ===
- MeSH L01.700.508 – medical informatics applications
- MeSH L01.700.508.100 – computer-assisted decision making
- MeSH L01.700.508.100.158 – computer-assisted diagnosis
- MeSH L01.700.508.100.158.600 – computer-assisted image interpretation
- MeSH L01.700.508.100.158.600.680 – computer-assisted radiographic image interpretation
- MeSH L01.700.508.100.710 – computer-assisted therapy
- MeSH L01.700.508.100.710.180 – computer-assisted drug therapy
- MeSH L01.700.508.100.710.600 – computer-assisted radiotherapy
- MeSH L01.700.508.100.710.600.550 – conformal radiotherapy
- MeSH L01.700.508.100.710.600.550.700 – intensity-modulated radiotherapy
- MeSH L01.700.508.100.710.600.608 – computer-assisted radiotherapy planning
- MeSH L01.700.508.100.710.800 – computer-assisted surgery
- MeSH L01.700.508.280 – information storage and retrieval
- MeSH L01.700.508.280.400 – grateful med
- MeSH L01.700.508.280.710 – MEDLARS
- MeSH L01.700.508.280.710.500 – MEDLINE
- MeSH L01.700.508.280.730 – MedlinePlus
- MeSH L01.700.508.280.750 – PubMed
- MeSH L01.700.508.280.750.500 – MEDLINE
- MeSH L01.700.508.300 – information systems
- MeSH L01.700.508.300.110 – clinical laboratory information systems
- MeSH L01.700.508.300.184 – community networks
- MeSH L01.700.508.300.190 – clinical decision support systems
- MeSH L01.700.508.300.221 – databases
- MeSH L01.700.508.300.221.300 – bibliographic databases
- MeSH L01.700.508.300.221.300.650 – PubMed
- MeSH L01.700.508.300.221.300.650.500 – MEDLINE
- MeSH L01.700.508.300.221.400 – factual databases
- MeSH L01.700.508.300.221.400.325 – genetic databases
- MeSH L01.700.508.300.221.400.325.630 – nucleic acid databases
- MeSH L01.700.508.300.221.400.325.710 – protein databases
- MeSH L01.700.508.300.221.400.600 – national practitioner data bank
- MeSH L01.700.508.300.221.400.900 – visible human project
- MeSH L01.700.508.300.314 – geographic information systems
- MeSH L01.700.508.300.408 – hospital information systems
- MeSH L01.700.508.300.408.600 – medical order entry systems
- MeSH L01.700.508.300.420 – integrated advanced information management systems
- MeSH L01.700.508.300.550 – knowledge bases
- MeSH L01.700.508.300.680 – management information systems
- MeSH L01.700.508.300.680.030 – ambulatory care information systems
- MeSH L01.700.508.300.680.065 – clinical laboratory information systems
- MeSH L01.700.508.300.680.085 – clinical pharmacy information systems
- MeSH L01.700.508.300.680.110 – database management systems
- MeSH L01.700.508.300.680.135 – management decision support systems
- MeSH L01.700.508.300.680.350 – healthcare common procedure coding system
- MeSH L01.700.508.300.680.360 – hospital information systems
- MeSH L01.700.508.300.680.360.450 – medical order entry systems
- MeSH L01.700.508.300.680.360.500 – operating room information systems
- MeSH L01.700.508.300.680.800 – personnel staffing and scheduling information systems
- MeSH L01.700.508.300.680.850 – radiology information systems
- MeSH L01.700.508.300.695 – computerized medical records systems
- MeSH L01.700.508.300.695.600 – medical order entry systems
- MeSH L01.700.508.300.710 – MEDLARS
- MeSH L01.700.508.300.710.500 – MEDLINE
- MeSH L01.700.508.300.742 – online systems
- MeSH L01.700.508.300.742.470 – digital libraries
- MeSH L01.700.508.300.742.650 – PubMed
- MeSH L01.700.508.300.742.650.500 – MEDLINE
- MeSH L01.700.508.300.780 – radiology information systems
- MeSH L01.700.508.300.790 – reminder systems
- MeSH L01.700.568 – medical informatics computing

=== MeSH L01.725 – pattern recognition, automated ===
- MeSH L01.725.500 – neural networks (computer)

=== MeSH L01.737 – publishing ===
- MeSH L01.737.150 – book industry
- MeSH L01.737.150.317 – bookbinding
- MeSH L01.737.150.340 – bookselling
- MeSH L01.737.150.340.250 – book prices
- MeSH L01.737.360 – copyright
- MeSH L01.737.471 – duplicate publication
- MeSH L01.737.484 – editorial policies
- MeSH L01.737.498 – journalism
- MeSH L01.737.498.500 – dental journalism
- MeSH L01.737.498.550 – medical journalism
- MeSH L01.737.640 – research peer review
- MeSH L01.737.684 – plagiarism
- MeSH L01.737.787 – printing
- MeSH L01.737.813 – publication bias
- MeSH L01.737.840 – retraction of publication

=== MeSH L01.906 – systems analysis ===
- MeSH L01.906.575 – operations research
- MeSH L01.906.575.422 – monte carlo method
- MeSH L01.906.575.622 – probability theory
- MeSH L01.906.575.748 – linear programming
- MeSH L01.906.787 – systems integration

The list continues at List of MeSH codes (M01).
