= List of MeSH codes (M01) =

The following is a list of "M" codes for Medical Subject Headings (MeSH), as defined by the United States National Library of Medicine (NLM).

This list continues the information at List of MeSH codes (L01). Codes following these are found at List of MeSH codes (N01). For other MeSH codes, see List of MeSH codes.

The source for this content is the set of 2006 MeSH Trees from the NLM.

== MeSH M01 – persons ==
=== MeSH M01.060 – age groups ===
- MeSH M01.060.057 – adolescent
- MeSH M01.060.116 – adult
- MeSH M01.060.116.100 – aged
- MeSH M01.060.116.100.080 – 80 and over aged
- MeSH M01.060.116.100.540 – frail elderly
- MeSH M01.060.116.630 – middle aged
- MeSH M01.060.406 – child
- MeSH M01.060.406.448 – preschool child
- MeSH M01.060.703 – infant
- MeSH M01.060.703.520 – newborn infant
- MeSH M01.060.703.520.460 – low birth weight infant
- MeSH M01.060.703.520.460.560 – small for gestational age infant
- MeSH M01.060.703.520.460.600 – very low birth weight infant
- MeSH M01.060.703.520.500 – postmature infant
- MeSH M01.060.703.520.520 – premature infant

=== MeSH M01.102 – exceptional child ===
- MeSH M01.102.350 – gifted child

=== MeSH M01.150 – disabled persons ===
- MeSH M01.150.100 – amputees
- MeSH M01.150.200 – disabled children
- MeSH M01.150.400 – hearing impaired persons
- MeSH M01.150.600 – mentally disabled persons
- MeSH M01.150.725 – mentally ill persons
- MeSH M01.150.850 – visually impaired persons

=== MeSH M01.325 – homeless persons ===
- MeSH M01.325.400 – homeless youth

=== MeSH M01.380 – legal guardians ===
- MeSH M01.380.600 – proxy

=== MeSH M01.390 – men ===
- MeSH M01.390.660 – male nurses

=== MeSH M01.438 – multiple birth offspring ===
- MeSH M01.438.486 – quadruplets
- MeSH M01.438.587 – quintuplets
- MeSH M01.438.768 – triplets
- MeSH M01.438.873 – twins
- MeSH M01.438.873.920 – dizygotic twins
- MeSH M01.438.873.940 – monozygotic twins

=== MeSH M01.526 – occupational groups ===
- MeSH M01.526.070 – administrative personnel
- MeSH M01.526.070.490 – health facility administrators
- MeSH M01.526.070.490.490 – hospital administrators
- MeSH M01.526.070.490.490.100 – hospital chief executive officers
- MeSH M01.526.070.670 – nurse administrators
- MeSH M01.526.070.700 – physician executives
- MeSH M01.526.070.940 – trustees
- MeSH M01.526.213 – clergy
- MeSH M01.526.276 – ethicists
- MeSH M01.526.339 – faculty
- MeSH M01.526.339.273 – dental faculty
- MeSH M01.526.339.373 – medical faculty
- MeSH M01.526.339.473 – nursing faculty
- MeSH M01.526.407 – foreign professional personnel
- MeSH M01.526.407.435 – foreign medical graduates
- MeSH M01.526.485 – health personnel
- MeSH M01.526.485.067 – allied health personnel
- MeSH M01.526.485.067.040 – animal technicians
- MeSH M01.526.485.067.080 – community health aides
- MeSH M01.526.485.067.105 – dental auxiliaries
- MeSH M01.526.485.067.105.250 – dental assistants
- MeSH M01.526.485.067.105.376 – dental hygienists
- MeSH M01.526.485.067.105.503 – dental technicians
- MeSH M01.526.485.067.105.503.300 – denturists
- MeSH M01.526.485.067.150 – emergency medical technicians
- MeSH M01.526.485.067.350 – home health aides
- MeSH M01.526.485.067.550 – medical record administrators
- MeSH M01.526.485.067.600 – medical secretaries
- MeSH M01.526.485.067.600.630 – medical receptionists
- MeSH M01.526.485.067.652 – nurses' aides
- MeSH M01.526.485.067.652.628 – psychiatric aides
- MeSH M01.526.485.067.700 – operating room technicians
- MeSH M01.526.485.067.735 – pharmacists' aides
- MeSH M01.526.485.067.740 – physician assistants
- MeSH M01.526.485.067.740.690 – ophthalmic assistants
- MeSH M01.526.485.067.740.750 – pediatric assistants
- MeSH M01.526.485.200 – caregivers
- MeSH M01.526.485.230 – coroners and medical examiners
- MeSH M01.526.485.290 – dental staff
- MeSH M01.526.485.290.490 – hospital dental staff
- MeSH M01.526.485.330 – dentists
- MeSH M01.526.485.330.310 – women dentists
- MeSH M01.526.485.360 – dental faculty
- MeSH M01.526.485.375 – medical faculty
- MeSH M01.526.485.390 – nursing faculty
- MeSH M01.526.485.410 – health educators
- MeSH M01.526.485.430 – health facility administrators
- MeSH M01.526.485.430.490 – hospital administrators
- MeSH M01.526.485.430.490.100 – hospital chief executive officers
- MeSH M01.526.485.490 – infection control practitioners
- MeSH M01.526.485.510 – laboratory personnel
- MeSH M01.526.485.630 – medical staff
- MeSH M01.526.485.630.490 – hospital medical staff
- MeSH M01.526.485.630.490.400 – hospitalists
- MeSH M01.526.485.650 – nurses
- MeSH M01.526.485.650.580 – nurse administrators
- MeSH M01.526.485.650.600 – nurse anesthetists
- MeSH M01.526.485.650.610 – nurse clinicians
- MeSH M01.526.485.650.620 – nurse midwives
- MeSH M01.526.485.650.640 – nurse practitioners
- MeSH M01.526.485.650.670 – male nurses
- MeSH M01.526.485.680 – nursing staff
- MeSH M01.526.485.680.490 – hospital nursing staff
- MeSH M01.526.485.740 – hospital personnel
- MeSH M01.526.485.740.322 – hospital dental staff
- MeSH M01.526.485.740.380 – hospital administrators
- MeSH M01.526.485.740.380.100 – hospital chief executive officers
- MeSH M01.526.485.740.400 – hospital volunteers
- MeSH M01.526.485.740.400.375 – hospital auxiliaries
- MeSH M01.526.485.740.422 – hospital medical staff
- MeSH M01.526.485.740.422.400 – hospitalists
- MeSH M01.526.485.740.523 – hospital nursing staff
- MeSH M01.526.485.780 – pharmacists
- MeSH M01.526.485.800 – physician executives
- MeSH M01.526.485.810 – physicians
- MeSH M01.526.485.810.390 – foreign medical graduates
- MeSH M01.526.485.810.580 – hospitalists
- MeSH M01.526.485.810.770 – family physicians
- MeSH M01.526.485.810.820 – women physicians
- MeSH M01.526.485.905 – veterinarians
- MeSH M01.526.520 – lawyers
- MeSH M01.526.555 – librarians
- MeSH M01.526.625 – military personnel
- MeSH M01.526.682 – missions and missionaries
- MeSH M01.526.760 – police
- MeSH M01.526.839 – research personnel

=== MeSH M01.620 – parents ===
- MeSH M01.620.390 – fathers
- MeSH M01.620.630 – mothers
- MeSH M01.620.785 – single parent
- MeSH M01.620.892 – surrogate mothers

=== MeSH M01.643 – patients ===
- MeSH M01.643.050 – hospitalized adolescent
- MeSH M01.643.154 – institutionalized adolescent
- MeSH M01.643.259 – hospitalized child
- MeSH M01.643.364 – institutionalized child
- MeSH M01.643.470 – inpatients
- MeSH M01.643.630 – outpatients
- MeSH M01.643.673 – patient dropouts
- MeSH M01.643.836 – survivors
- MeSH M01.643.836.400 – hiv long-term survivors

=== MeSH M01.686 – population groups ===
- MeSH M01.686.508 – continental population groups
- MeSH M01.686.508.100 – african continental ancestry group
- MeSH M01.686.508.100.100 – african americans
- MeSH M01.686.508.150 – american native continental ancestry group
- MeSH M01.686.508.150.575 – central american indians
- MeSH M01.686.508.150.600 – north american indians
- MeSH M01.686.508.150.625 – south american indians
- MeSH D004930 – Inuit
- MeSH M01.686.508.200 – asian continental ancestry group
- MeSH M01.686.508.200.100 – asian americans
- MeSH M01.686.508.400 – european continental ancestry group
- MeSH M01.686.508.600 – oceanic ancestry group
- MeSH M01.686.754 – ethnic groups
- MeSH M01.686.754.100 – african americans
- MeSH M01.686.754.167 – arabs
- MeSH M01.686.754.225 – asian americans
- MeSH M01.686.754.283 – gypsies
- MeSH M01.686.754.441 – Hispanic Americans
- MeSH M01.686.754.441.500 – mexican americans
- MeSH M01.686.754.520 – inuits [sic]
- MeSH M01.686.754.600 – jews

=== MeSH M01.770 – research personnel ===
- MeSH M01.770.100 – astronauts

=== MeSH M01.848 – students ===
- MeSH M01.848.602 – student dropouts
- MeSH M01.848.769 – health occupations students
- MeSH M01.848.769.519 – dental students
- MeSH M01.848.769.602 – medical students
- MeSH M01.848.769.685 – nursing students
- MeSH M01.848.769.768 – pharmacy students
- MeSH M01.848.769.851 – premedical students
- MeSH M01.848.769.925 – public health students

=== MeSH M01.860 – survivors ===
- MeSH M01.860.400 – hiv long-term survivors

=== MeSH M01.898 – tissue donors ===
- MeSH M01.898.313 – blood donors
- MeSH M01.898.656 – living donors

=== MeSH M01.955 – voluntary workers ===
- MeSH M01.955.473 – hospital volunteers
- MeSH M01.955.473.375 – hospital auxiliaries

=== MeSH M01.975 – women ===
- MeSH M01.975.155 – battered women
- MeSH M01.975.310 – women dentists
- MeSH M01.975.790 – women physicians
- MeSH M01.975.807 – pregnant women
- MeSH M01.975.825 – working women

The list continues at List of MeSH codes (N01).
