= List of MeSH codes (K01) =

The following is a list of "K" codes for Medical Subject Headings (MeSH), as defined by the United States National Library of Medicine (NLM).

This list continues the information at List of MeSH codes (J02). Codes following these are found at List of MeSH codes (L01). For other MeSH codes, see List of MeSH codes.

The source for this content is the set of 2006 MeSH Trees from the NLM.

== MeSH K01 – humanities ==
=== MeSH K01.093 – art ===
- MeSH K01.093.206 – caricatures
- MeSH K01.093.206.332 – cartoons
- MeSH K01.093.346 – engraving and engravings
- MeSH K01.093.378 – human body
- MeSH K01.093.410 – medical illustration
- MeSH K01.093.410.100 – artistic anatomy
- MeSH K01.093.530 – medicine in art
- MeSH K01.093.560 – numismatics
- MeSH K01.093.646 – paintings
- MeSH K01.093.660 – philately
- MeSH K01.093.742 – portraits
- MeSH K01.093.849 – sculpture

=== MeSH K01.150 – awards and prizes ===
- MeSH K01.150.567 – Nobel Prize

=== MeSH K01.316 – ethics ===
- MeSH K01.316.034 – bioethical issues
- MeSH K01.316.070 – bioethics
- MeSH K01.316.070.500 – clinical ethics
- MeSH K01.316.090 – complicity
- MeSH K01.316.130 – conflict of interest
- MeSH K01.316.163 – ethical analysis
- MeSH K01.316.163.150 – casuistry
- MeSH K01.316.163.750 – retrospective moral judgment
- MeSH K01.316.163.875 – wedge argument
- MeSH K01.316.165 – ethical relativism
- MeSH K01.316.167 – ethical review
- MeSH K01.316.167.200 – ethics consultation
- MeSH K01.316.169 – ethical theory
- MeSH K01.316.171 – ethicists
- MeSH K01.316.173 – ethics committees
- MeSH K01.316.173.500 – clinical ethics committees
- MeSH K01.316.173.750 – research ethics committees
- MeSH K01.316.181 – business ethics
- MeSH K01.316.190 – institutional ethics
- MeSH K01.316.333 – professional ethics
- MeSH K01.316.333.065 – codes of ethics
- MeSH K01.316.333.065.249 – Helsinki Declaration
- MeSH K01.316.333.065.400 – Hippocratic Oath
- MeSH K01.316.333.132 – clinical ethics
- MeSH K01.316.333.266 – dental ethics
- MeSH K01.316.333.366 – medical ethics
- MeSH K01.316.333.366.551 – Hippocratic Oath
- MeSH K01.316.333.466 – nursing ethics
- MeSH K01.316.333.566 – pharmacy ethics
- MeSH K01.316.366 – research ethics
- MeSH K01.316.366.400 – Helsinki Declaration
- MeSH K01.316.400 – humanism
- MeSH K01.316.400.400 – feminism
- MeSH K01.316.630 – morals
- MeSH K01.316.630.350 – conscience
- MeSH K01.316.630.472 – moral development
- MeSH K01.316.630.595 – social responsibility
- MeSH K01.316.630.595.500 – moral obligations
- MeSH K01.316.630.840 – virtues
- MeSH K01.316.722 – personhood
- MeSH K01.316.745 – principle-based ethics
- MeSH K01.316.745.500 – beneficence
- MeSH K01.316.745.650 – personal autonomy
- MeSH K01.316.745.750 – social justice
- MeSH K01.316.768 – professional misconduct
- MeSH K01.316.768.500 – scientific misconduct

=== MeSH K01.504 – history ===
- MeSH K01.504.075 – alchemy
- MeSH K01.504.095 – anniversaries and special events
- MeSH K01.504.152 – archives
- MeSH K01.504.152.552 – museums
- MeSH K01.504.255 – emblems and insignia
- MeSH K01.504.359 – genealogy and heraldry
- MeSH K01.504.441 – historiography
- MeSH K01.504.470 – ancient history
- MeSH K01.504.472 – medieval history
- MeSH K01.504.475 – early modern 1451–1600 history
- MeSH K01.504.475.500 – 15th century history
- MeSH K01.504.475.750 – 16th century history
- MeSH K01.504.504 – modern 1601– history
- MeSH K01.504.504.750 – 17th century history
- MeSH K01.504.504.875 – 18th century history
- MeSH K01.504.504.875.100 – American Revolution
- MeSH K01.504.504.875.374 – French Revolution
- MeSH K01.504.504.937 – 19th century history
- MeSH K01.504.504.937.100 – American Civil War
- MeSH K01.504.504.937.500 – Crimean War
- MeSH K01.504.504.937.750 – 1898 Spanish-American war
- MeSH K01.504.504.968 – 20th century history
- MeSH K01.504.504.968.100 – Russian-Japanese War
- MeSH K01.504.504.968.300 – World War I
- MeSH K01.504.504.968.400 – World War II
- MeSH K01.504.504.968.500 – Korean War
- MeSH K01.504.504.968.600 – Vietnam conflict
- MeSH K01.504.504.968.700 – Chernobyl nuclear accident
- MeSH K01.504.504.968.800 – Gulf War
- MeSH K01.504.504.984 – 21st century history
- MeSH K01.504.504.984.500 – September 11 terrorist attacks
- MeSH K01.504.551 – history of dentistry
- MeSH K01.504.552 – history of medicine
- MeSH K01.504.552.053 – barber surgeons
- MeSH K01.504.552.169 – grave robbing
- MeSH K01.504.552.643 – Arabic medicine
- MeSH K01.504.552.643.500 – Unani medicine
- MeSH K01.504.608 – history of nursing
- MeSH K01.504.703 – natural history
- MeSH K01.504.799 – phrenology
- MeSH K01.504.899 – symbolism
- MeSH K01.504.899.500 – metaphor

=== MeSH K01.517 – literature ===
- MeSH K01.517.067 – anecdotes
- MeSH K01.517.116 – aphorisms and proverbs
- MeSH K01.517.172 – Bible
- MeSH K01.517.211 – biography
- MeSH K01.517.211.215 – autobiography
- MeSH K01.517.211.506 – famous persons
- MeSH K01.517.333 – drama
- MeSH K01.517.495 – medieval literature
- MeSH K01.517.533 – modern literature
- MeSH K01.517.584 – medicine in literature
- MeSH K01.517.647 – mythology
- MeSH K01.517.732 – philology
- MeSH K01.517.732.477 – classical philology
- MeSH K01.517.732.602 – oriental philology
- MeSH K01.517.732.727 – romance philology
- MeSH K01.517.781 – poetry
- MeSH K01.517.946 – wit and humor

=== MeSH K01.672 – occultism ===
- MeSH K01.672.296 – astrology

=== MeSH K01.752 – philosophy ===
- MeSH K01.752.052 – postmodernism
- MeSH K01.752.105 – qi
- MeSH K01.752.210 – esthetics
- MeSH K01.752.210.304 – beauty
- MeSH K01.752.256 – ethics
- MeSH K01.752.256.090 – complicity
- MeSH K01.752.256.101 – double effect
- MeSH K01.752.256.113 – ethical analysis
- MeSH K01.752.256.113.150 – casuistry
- MeSH K01.752.256.113.750 – retrospective moral judgment
- MeSH K01.752.256.113.875 – wedge argument
- MeSH K01.752.256.116 – ethical relativism
- MeSH K01.752.256.118 – ethical theory
- MeSH K01.752.256.120 – humanism
- MeSH K01.752.256.120.400 – feminism
- MeSH K01.752.256.547 – morals
- MeSH K01.752.256.547.359 – conscience
- MeSH K01.752.256.547.599 – social responsibility
- MeSH K01.752.256.547.599.500 – moral obligations
- MeSH K01.752.256.547.840 – virtues
- MeSH K01.752.256.660 – personhood
- MeSH K01.752.256.830 – principle-based ethics
- MeSH K01.752.256.830.500 – beneficence
- MeSH K01.752.256.830.650 – personal autonomy
- MeSH K01.752.256.830.750 – social justice
- MeSH K01.752.304 – existentialism
- MeSH K01.752.400 – life
- MeSH K01.752.400.100 – beginning of human life
- MeSH K01.752.400.750 – quality of life
- MeSH K01.752.400.900 – value of life
- MeSH K01.752.448 – logic
- MeSH K01.752.448.250 – fuzzy logic
- MeSH K01.752.511 – metaphysics
- MeSH K01.752.622 – dental philosophy
- MeSH K01.752.622.416 – dental ethics
- MeSH K01.752.667 – medical philosophy
- MeSH K01.752.667.400 – empiricism
- MeSH K01.752.667.416 – medical ethics
- MeSH K01.752.667.710 – holistic health
- MeSH K01.752.667.750 – humoralism
- MeSH K01.752.712 – nursing philosophy
- MeSH K01.752.712.416 – nursing ethics
- MeSH K01.752.712.708 – holistic nursing
- MeSH K01.752.798 – symbolism
- MeSH K01.752.798.500 – metaphor
- MeSH K01.752.827 – thanatology
- MeSH K01.752.884 – utopias
- MeSH K01.752.935 – vitalism
- MeSH K01.752.967 – yin-yang

=== MeSH K01.844 – religion ===
- MeSH K01.844.058 – anthroposophy
- MeSH K01.844.117 – Buddhism
- MeSH K01.844.188 – Christianity
- MeSH K01.844.188.250 – Catholicism
- MeSH K01.844.188.431 – Christian Science
- MeSH K01.844.188.466 – The Church of Jesus Christ of Latter-day Saints
- MeSH K01.844.188.502 – Eastern Orthodoxy
- MeSH K01.844.188.573 – Jehovah's Witnesses
- MeSH K01.844.188.644 – Protestantism
- MeSH K01.844.188.715 – saints
- MeSH K01.844.231 – Hinduism
- MeSH K01.844.275 – Islam
- MeSH K01.844.385 – Judaism
- MeSH K01.844.619 – religion and medicine
- MeSH K01.844.664 – religion and psychology
- MeSH K01.844.664.500 – spirituality
- MeSH K01.844.709 – religion and science
- MeSH K01.844.754 – religion and sex
- MeSH K01.844.799 – religious philosophies
- MeSH K01.844.799.214 – Confucianism
- MeSH K01.844.799.430 – mysticism
- MeSH K01.844.799.679 – spiritualism
- MeSH K01.844.799.867 – yoga
- MeSH K01.844.949 – theology

=== MeSH K01.922 – secularism ===
The list continues at List of MeSH codes (L01).
