= List of MeSH codes (N01) =

The following is a partial list of the "N" codes for Medical Subject Headings (MeSH), as defined by the United States National Library of Medicine (NLM).

This list continues the information at List of MeSH codes (M01). Codes following these are found at List of MeSH codes (N02). For other MeSH codes, see List of MeSH codes.

The source for this content is the set of 2006 MeSH Trees from the NLM.

== MeSH N01 – population characteristics ==
=== MeSH N01.224 – demography ===
- MeSH N01.224.033 – age distribution
- MeSH N01.224.175 – censuses
- MeSH N01.224.317 – ethnic groups
- MeSH N01.224.361 – family characteristics
- MeSH N01.224.361.150 – birth intervals
- MeSH N01.224.361.160 – birth order
- MeSH N01.224.361.500 – marital status
- MeSH N01.224.361.500.300 – divorce
- MeSH N01.224.361.500.500 – marriage
- MeSH N01.224.361.500.725 – single person
- MeSH N01.224.361.500.725.700 – single parent
- MeSH N01.224.361.500.862 – widowhood
- MeSH N01.224.425 – health status
- MeSH N01.224.425.350 – geriatric assessment
- MeSH N01.224.425.525 – nutritional status
- MeSH N01.224.600 – population density
- MeSH N01.224.625 – population dynamics
- MeSH N01.224.625.350 – emigration and immigration
- MeSH N01.224.625.400 – health transition
- MeSH N01.224.625.650 – population control
- MeSH N01.224.625.660 – population growth
- MeSH N01.224.708 – population groups
- MeSH N01.224.791 – residence characteristics
- MeSH N01.224.791.200 – catchment area (health)
- MeSH N01.224.791.400 – housing
- MeSH N01.224.791.400.410 – housing for the elderly
- MeSH N01.224.791.400.650 – public housing
- MeSH N01.224.791.700 – residential mobility
- MeSH N01.224.803 – sex distribution
- MeSH N01.224.803.815 – sex ratio
- MeSH N01.224.935 – vital statistics
- MeSH N01.224.935.464 – life expectancy
- MeSH N01.224.935.530 – life tables
- MeSH N01.224.935.530.700 – quality-adjusted life years
- MeSH N01.224.935.597 – morbidity
- MeSH N01.224.935.597.080 – basic reproduction number
- MeSH N01.224.935.597.500 – incidence
- MeSH N01.224.935.597.750 – prevalence
- MeSH N01.224.935.698 – mortality
- MeSH N01.224.935.698.100 – cause of death
- MeSH N01.224.935.698.150 – child mortality
- MeSH N01.224.935.698.201 – fatal outcome
- MeSH N01.224.935.698.300 – fetal mortality
- MeSH N01.224.935.698.400 – hospital mortality
- MeSH N01.224.935.698.489 – infant mortality
- MeSH N01.224.935.698.653 – maternal mortality
- MeSH N01.224.935.698.826 – survival rate
- MeSH N01.224.935.849 – pregnancy rate
- MeSH N01.224.935.849.500 – birth rate

=== MeSH N01.400 – health ===
- MeSH N01.400.300 – family health
- MeSH N01.400.350 – holistic health
- MeSH N01.400.500 – mental health
- MeSH N01.400.525 – occupational health
- MeSH N01.400.535 – oral health
- MeSH N01.400.545 – physical fitness
- MeSH N01.400.550 – public health
- MeSH N01.400.650 – rural health
- MeSH N01.400.700 – suburban health
- MeSH N01.400.800 – urban health
- MeSH N01.400.900 – women's health
- MeSH N01.400.910 – world health

=== MeSH N01.600 – population ===
- MeSH N01.600.725 – rural population
- MeSH N01.600.775 – suburban population
- MeSH N01.600.900 – urban population

=== MeSH N01.824 – socioeconomic factors ===
- MeSH N01.824.175 – career mobility
- MeSH N01.824.196 – educational status
- MeSH N01.824.245 – employment
- MeSH N01.824.245.350 – employment, supported
- MeSH N01.824.245.600 – personnel downsizing
- MeSH N01.824.245.850 – unemployment
- MeSH N01.824.245.925 – workplace
- MeSH N01.824.308 – family characteristics
- MeSH N01.824.308.500 – marital status
- MeSH N01.824.308.500.300 – divorce
- MeSH N01.824.308.500.500 – marriage
- MeSH N01.824.308.500.725 – single person
- MeSH N01.824.308.500.725.700 – single parent
- MeSH N01.824.308.500.862 – widowhood
- MeSH N01.824.417 – income
- MeSH N01.824.417.510 – pensions
- MeSH N01.824.417.510.300 – Employee Retirement Income Security Act
- MeSH N01.824.417.700 – salaries and fringe benefits
- MeSH N01.824.417.700.162 – family leave
- MeSH N01.824.417.700.162.500 – parental leave
- MeSH N01.824.417.700.325 – health benefit plans, employee
- MeSH N01.824.417.700.325.300 – Employee Retirement Income Security Act
- MeSH N01.824.417.700.662 – sick leave
- MeSH N01.824.460 – medical indigency
- MeSH N01.824.547 – occupations
- MeSH N01.824.547.330 – career mobility
- MeSH N01.824.600 – poverty
- MeSH N01.824.600.550 – poverty areas
- MeSH N01.824.737 – social change
- MeSH N01.824.782 – social class
- MeSH N01.824.782.673 – social mobility
- MeSH N01.824.827 – social conditions

The list continues at List of MeSH codes (N02).
