= List of MeSH codes (J02) =

The following is a partial list of the "J" codes for Medical Subject Headings (MeSH), as defined by the United States National Library of Medicine (NLM).

This list continues the information at List of MeSH codes (J01). Codes following these are found at List of MeSH codes (K01). For other MeSH codes, see List of MeSH codes.

The source for this content is the set of 2006 MeSH Trees from the NLM.

== MeSH J02 – food and beverages ==
=== MeSH J02.200 – beverages ===
- MeSH J02.200.100 – alcoholic beverages
- MeSH J02.200.100.100 – absinthe
- MeSH J02.200.100.200 – beer
- MeSH J02.200.100.900 – wine
- MeSH J02.200.300 – carbonated beverages
- MeSH J02.200.325 – coffee
- MeSH J02.200.700 – milk
- MeSH J02.200.700.124 – cultured milk products
- MeSH J02.200.700.249 – infant formula
- MeSH J02.200.700.500 – milk, human
- MeSH J02.200.712 – milk substitutes
- MeSH J02.200.712.249 – infant formula
- MeSH J02.200.712.500 – soy milk
- MeSH J02.200.725 – mineral waters
- MeSH J02.200.900 – tea

=== MeSH J02.500 – food ===
- MeSH J02.500.100 – bread
- MeSH J02.500.140 – candy
- MeSH J02.500.140.200 – chewing gum
- MeSH J02.500.200 – cereals
- MeSH J02.500.200.066 – avena sativa
- MeSH J02.500.200.175 – fagopyrum
- MeSH J02.500.200.333 – hordeum
- MeSH J02.500.200.700 – oryza sativa
- MeSH J02.500.200.733 – panicum
- MeSH J02.500.200.750 – secale cereale
- MeSH J02.500.200.875 – triticum
- MeSH J02.500.200.909 – zea mays
- MeSH J02.500.250 – condiments
- MeSH J02.500.250.725 – spices
- MeSH J02.500.250.725.500 – black pepper
- MeSH J02.500.300 – crops, agricultural
- MeSH J02.500.300.100 – animal feed
- MeSH J02.500.300.100.088 – avena sativa
- MeSH J02.500.300.100.175 – fagopyrum
- MeSH J02.500.300.100.287 – helianthus
- MeSH J02.500.300.100.400 – lolium
- MeSH J02.500.300.100.555 – medicago sativa
- MeSH J02.500.300.100.575 – mustard plant
- MeSH J02.500.300.100.606 – panicum
- MeSH J02.500.300.100.750 – secale cereale
- MeSH J02.500.300.100.800 – silage
- MeSH J02.500.300.100.900 – soybeans
- MeSH J02.500.300.100.977 – zea mays
- MeSH J02.500.350 – dairy products
- MeSH J02.500.350.100 – butter
- MeSH J02.500.350.200 – cheese
- MeSH J02.500.350.400 – ice cream
- MeSH J02.500.350.500 – margarine
- MeSH J02.500.350.525 – milk
- MeSH J02.500.350.525.221 – cultured milk products
- MeSH J02.500.350.525.221.888 – yogurt
- MeSH J02.500.350.525.332 – infant formula
- MeSH J02.500.350.525.500 – milk, human
- MeSH J02.500.375 – dietary fats
- MeSH J02.500.375.200 – butter
- MeSH J02.500.375.400 – dietary fats, unsaturated
- MeSH J02.500.375.400.250 – corn oil
- MeSH J02.500.375.400.300 – cottonseed oil
- MeSH J02.500.375.400.700 – safflower oil
- MeSH J02.500.375.400.725 – sesame oil
- MeSH J02.500.375.400.750 – soybean oil
- MeSH J02.500.375.650 – margarine
- MeSH J02.500.400 – dietary fiber
- MeSH J02.500.456 – dietary supplements
- MeSH J02.500.456.500 – probiotics
- MeSH J02.500.456.933 – yeast, dried
- MeSH J02.500.470 – eggs
- MeSH J02.500.470.700 – egg white
- MeSH J02.500.470.800 – egg yolk
- MeSH J02.500.484 – flour
- MeSH J02.500.512 – food additives
- MeSH J02.500.512.350 – fat substitutes
- MeSH J02.500.512.400 – flavoring agents
- MeSH J02.500.512.400.125 – calcium citrate
- MeSH J02.500.512.400.587 – safrole
- MeSH J02.500.512.400.700 – sweetening agents
- MeSH J02.500.512.700 – food preservatives
- MeSH J02.500.518 – food, genetically modified
- MeSH J02.500.525 – foods, specialized
- MeSH J02.500.525.350 – food, formulated
- MeSH J02.500.525.350.500 – infant formula
- MeSH J02.500.525.400 – food, fortified
- MeSH J02.500.525.450 – health food
- MeSH J02.500.525.500 – infant food
- MeSH J02.500.525.500.500 – infant formula
- MeSH J02.500.562 – fruit
- MeSH J02.500.581 – honey
- MeSH J02.500.600 – meat
- MeSH J02.500.600.500 – meat products
- MeSH J02.500.600.750 – poultry
- MeSH J02.500.600.750.500 – poultry products
- MeSH J02.500.600.875 – seafood
- MeSH J02.500.600.875.400 – fish products
- MeSH J02.500.600.875.400.400 – fish flour
- MeSH J02.500.600.875.700 – shellfish
- MeSH J02.500.662 – molasses
- MeSH J02.500.700 – nuts
- MeSH J02.500.775 – seeds
- MeSH J02.500.850 – vegetables
- MeSH J02.500.850.100 – allium
- MeSH J02.500.850.100.300 – garlic
- MeSH J02.500.850.100.500 – onions
- MeSH J02.500.850.150 – brassica
- MeSH J02.500.850.175 – capsicum
- MeSH J02.500.850.237 – chicory
- MeSH J02.500.850.243 – chive
- MeSH J02.500.850.250 – cucumis sativus
- MeSH J02.500.850.311 – daucus carota
- MeSH J02.500.850.500 – fabaceae
- MeSH J02.500.850.500.077 – arachis hypogaea
- MeSH J02.500.850.500.500 – peas
- MeSH J02.500.850.500.700 – soybeans
- MeSH J02.500.850.500.700.500 – soy foods
- MeSH J02.500.850.500.700.500.500 – soy milk
- MeSH J02.500.850.500.700.500.750 – soybean proteins
- MeSH J02.500.850.525 – lettuce
- MeSH J02.500.850.533 – lycopersicon esculentum
- MeSH J02.500.850.537 – mustard plant
- MeSH J02.500.850.700 – rheum
- MeSH J02.500.850.750 – shallots
- MeSH J02.500.850.790 – solanum tuberosum
- MeSH J02.500.850.800 – spinacia oleracea

The list continues at List of MeSH codes (K01).
