= Human–machine system =

Human–machine system is a system in which the functions of a human operator (or a group of operators) and a machine are integrated. This term can also be used to emphasize the view of such a system as a single entity that interacts with external environment.

A manual system consists of hand tools and other aids which are coupled by a human operator who controls the operation. Operators of such systems use their own physical energy as the power source. The system could range from a person with a hammer to a person with a super-strength giving exoskeleton.

Human machine system engineering is different from the more general and well known fields like human–computer interaction and sociotechnical engineering in that it focuses on complex, dynamic control systems that often are partially automated (such as flying an airplane). It also studies human problem-solving in naturalistic settings or in high-fidelity simulation environments.

== Human–machine choreography ==
The area of human–machine choreography is yet to be extensively explored. How body-structure can be extended through machine mechanisms points to how the body can perform beyond its biological form and functions as well as beyond the local space it inhabits. How human movement is transduced into machine motion and then can be both expressed and extended into virtual performance on the web promises new possibilities in both conceptual approach and aesthetic application. For example, incorporating virtual camera views of the performing human–machine system enriches the choreography and intensifies the artistic result.

== The Muscle Machine ==
The Muscle Machine is a hybrid human–robot walking machine. Designed by artist Stelarc (who has also created other such systems), it is an exoskeleton with six robotic legs that are controlled by the leg and hand movements of its pilot.

=== Mechanism ===
The rubber muscles contract when inflated and extend when exhausted. This results in a more reliable and robust engineering design. The body stands on the ground within the chassis of the machine, which incorporates a lower body exoskeleton connecting it to the robot. Encoders on the hip joints provides the data that will allow the human controller to move and direct the machine as well as vary the speed at which it will travel. The action of the human operator lifting a leg lifts the three alternate machine legs and swings them forward. By turning its torso, the body makes the machine walk in the direction it is facing. Thus the interface and interaction is more direct, allowing an intuitive human-machine choreography. The walking system, with attached accelerometer sensors generates data that is converted to sounds that augment the acoustical pneumatics and machine mechanism operation. Once the machine is in motion, it is no longer applicable to ask whether the human or machine is in control as they become fully integrated and move as one. The six-legged robot both extends the body and transforms its bipedal gait into a 6-legged insect-like movement. The appearance and movement of the machine legs are both limb-like and wing-like motion.

== In popular culture ==
Human–machine systems have been portrayed in the media on many accounts. Cyborgs, seen in movies such as The Terminator and RoboCop, are fantastical depictions of what human-machine systems may, one day, look like.

== See also ==
- Ergonomics
- Human–computer interaction
- Human–machine interface
