= Grateful Med =

Interface to various medical databases

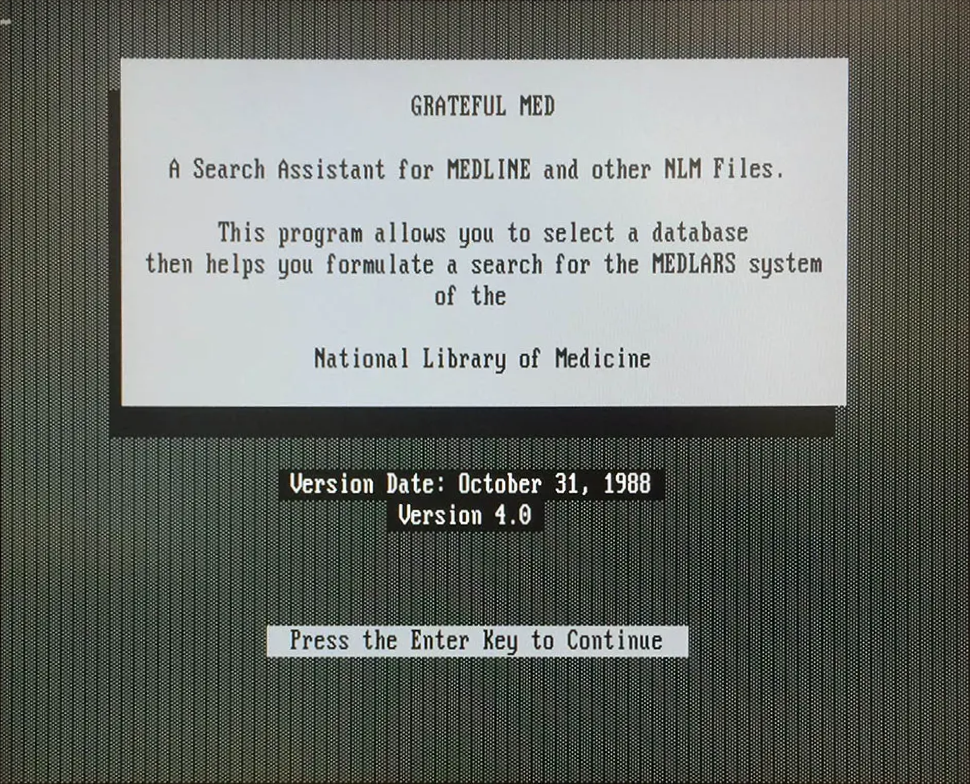
Grateful Med 4.0 homescreen, released on October 31, 1988.

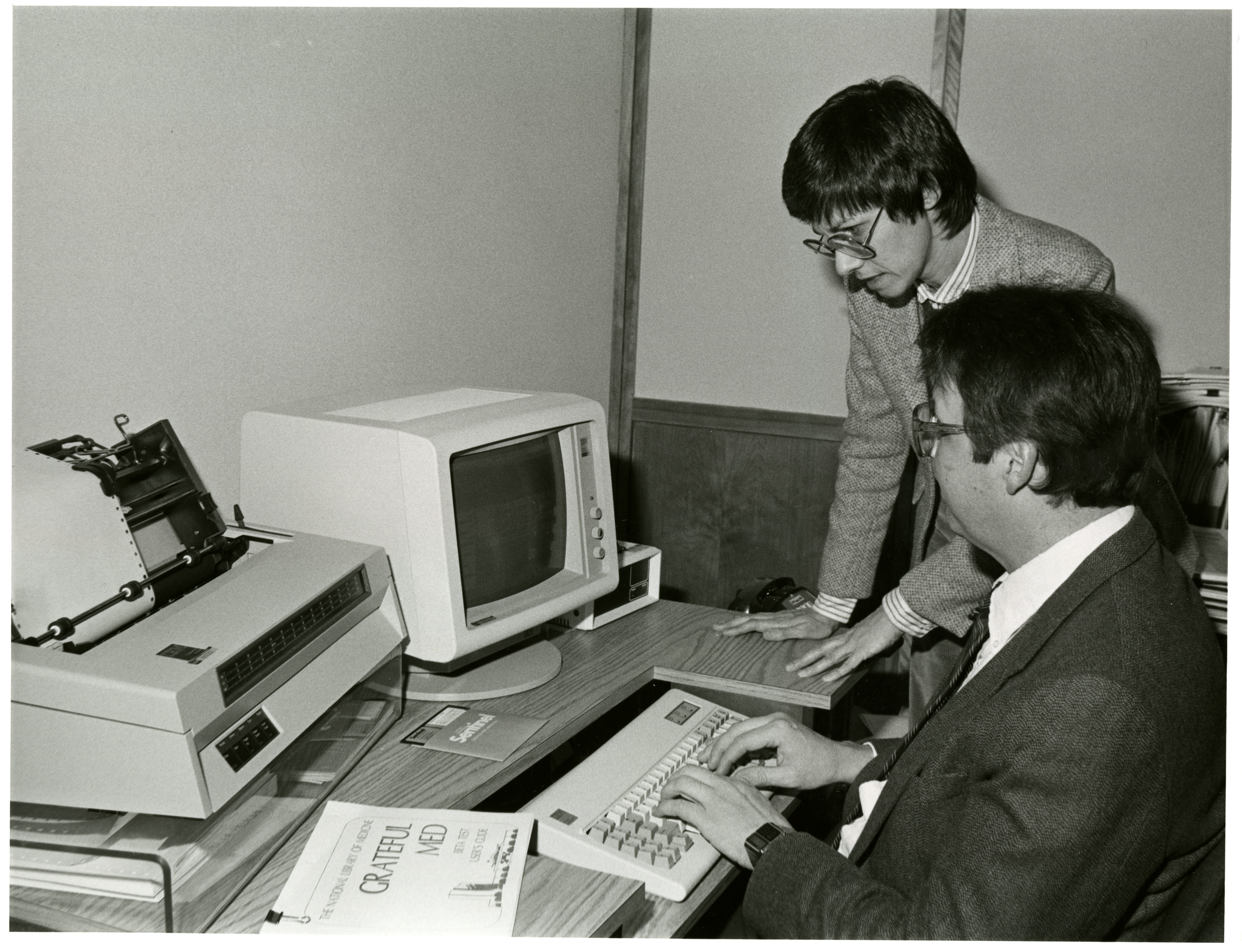
Grateful Med librarians John Anderson (sitting) and Rosemary Woodsmall in 1986.

Grateful Med was a direct health professional interface to MEDLINE and other MEDLARS databases. Grateful Med, a pun on the rock band Grateful Dead, was adapted from Microsearch, an ELHILL user interface that assembled query language prior to connecting to the National Library of Medicine (NLM) mainframe. It was released to the public in 1986 after rapid development as a pet project of newly appointed NLM Director Donald A. B. Lindberg, who wanted to create a front-end software interface to make NLM's mainframe searches directly useful to physicians. Prior to its release, searches involved learning command language, asking librarians, or using CD-ROM-based MEDLINE subsets.

Grateful Med prepared the query prior to connecting to the mainframe, and disconnected immediately after retrieving the results. This significantly lowered connection time and search costs. Subsequent research demonstrated that when hospital-based physicians had to pay for Grateful Med search results, searches decreased by 30%.

In addition to hospital and library access, access to MEDLINE through GRATEFUL MED became possible for rural practitioners through procurement of NLM passwords.

Grateful Med 1.0, released in 1986, was replaced by Grateful Med 2.0 in 1987 due to user input solicited and curated by Rosemary Woodsmall. The database was later uploaded on the internet in July 1996, where it was branded as "Internet Grateful Med". It was later made available for free in June 1997. In total it remained in use from 1986 through 2001, when it was removed primarily due to its replacement by PubMed. Prior to the release of PubMed in 1996, Grateful Med was used in 80% of NLM database searches.
