= Neuroanatomy of handedness =

Relationship between handedness and the nervous system

An estimated 90% of the world's human population consider themselves to be right-handed. The human brain's control of motor function is a mirror image in terms of connectivity: the left hemisphere controls the right hand and vice versa. This theoretically means that the hemisphere contralateral to the dominant hand tends to be more dominant than the ipsilateral hemisphere; however, this is not always the case, and there are numerous other factors which contribute in complex ways to physical hand preference.

== Language and speech areas ==
Language areas are represented unilaterally in the human brain. In around 95% of right-handers, these brain areas are often located on the left hemisphere, however the proportion reduces in left handers down to around 70%. Therefore 7 in every 100 individuals is right-hemisphered for language and left-hand dominant. It is unclear as to whether or not left-hemisphered left handers suffer any language or writing deficits because of this. Broca's area has been found to have differing grey matter structures depending on handedness. The inferior frontal sulcus, which contains Broca's area, was found to be more continuous in the hemisphere ipsilateral to the dominant hand

=== Corpus callosum ===
Because the left arm is controlled by the right hemisphere and vice versa, the corpus callosum has also been found to be larger in left-handers. This is theoretically so that language comprehension and production can more efficiently move from the primary language areas into the motor areas which control the contralateral arm. No research has investigated the effect of being right-hemispheric for language whilst being left-handed, and whether or not the corpus callosum is still larger without the need to communicate across hemispheres, such would be the case in right-hemispheric left-handers.

=== Planum temporale ===
The planum temporale is a brain region within Broca's Area, and is thought to be the most asymmetric area of the human brain; with the left side having shown to be five times the size of the right in some individuals. However in people who are left handed, this asymmetry has shown to be reduced

== Motor areas ==
Handedness correlates in motor areas have been found to be more subtle and less pronounced than language areas, but are nevertheless still detectable.

=== Central sulcus ===
The surface area of the central sulcus has been found to be larger in the dominant hemisphere, as well as the 'hand knob', an area in the primary motor cortex which is responsible for hand movements, is located more dorsally in the left hemisphere of people who are right- compared to left-handed

=== Right shift theory ===
Marian Annett devised the Right Shift Theory in 1972, which states that language areas and motor cortex development is preferential in the left hemisphere due to the theoretical gene RS+. This theory also states that there is no particular gene which causes increased right-hemispheric development compared to left, instead without the RS+ gene the development is a gaussian curve which is centralised. The presence of the RS+ gene promotes left-hemispheric dominance, in turn introducing a right-handedness bias which shifts the curve towards the right.

== Corticospinal tract ==
The corticospinal tract is a bundle of white matter which connects the cerebral cortex with motor neurons in the spinal cord. Notably, humans show a natural asymmetry between left and right tracts, such that the left tract (and therefore connections to the right hand) is significantly larger. However this asymmetry has been found to be reduced in left-handers, suggesting a less biased connection to both hands.

== Forced handedness ==
In order to untangle causality, some research employs a 'forced handedness' group. Left-handers who were forced during childhood to use their right hand showed a larger surface area of the central sulcus in their left hemisphere, which is associated with right-handedness. Also, structures in the basal ganglia such as the putamen also mirrored developmental right-hand dominant individuals in the forced group.

== Face processing ==
The Fusiform Face area is an area typically unilaterally, much like the language areas, and localized on the right fusiform gyrus. However, this brain region has been found to be more bilateral in left-handers; that is the left fusiform gyrus responds more to faces in left-handers than in right-handers. However the occipital face area shows no such correlation, and so handedness is thought to impact face processing on a level in the hierarchy which does not involve the occipital face area, however does include the fusiform gyrus.

== Complications ==
=== Handedness inventory ===
Handedness in and of itself tends to be a grey area. The requirements for someone to be right- as opposed to left-handed have been debated, and because individuals who identify as left-handed may also use their right hand for a large number of tasks, identifying two clearcut groups of subjects is a challenging task. The Edinburgh Handedness Inventory is a common parametric test used to determine handedness, by comparing individuals to the population at large. However use of this inventory varies between researchers, and it has been criticized for its use in modern research. This means that an individual which one research group may classify as a left-hander, may be classified as ambidextrous in another; leading to difficulties in comparison between the two.

=== Conflicting evidence ===
A number of asymmetrical findings have been disputed, with various studies stating null results in opposition to previously reported differences. This is an issue in handedness neuroscience, as imaging methods are highly susceptible to type 1 errors due to the number of comparisons which they make.

=== Complexity of causality ===
The relationship between handedness and its neuronal correlates is complex. Language areas themselves are not concretely correlated, and motor area show exceedingly subtle differences. Because of this, the literature shows many differing opinions. Clearly, advances in research are still necessary to unveil true causal relationships between structural differences and their manifestation in the form of handedness.

=== Frontal Right/Left Areas and Psychopathology ===
It has been reported some cases of inmates, showing a larger Right-Prefrontal cortex, yet being controlled or dominant their Left-Prefrontal cortex. and it has been associated to criminal behaviour and also to psychopathic traits.

In a review, it was associated to the "impulsive behaviour", handedness, mostly left and/or crossed lateralities, and above of all, the eyedness or eye-laterality as a key to detect and to relate brain lateralization which that behavioural disorder when it is crossed-eye-hand laterality which has also been related in a work, reporting a sample of 5% of crossed left-handedness into a population of 57 left-handedness (5-6%) and found possibly associated with emotions and limbic system, as well as to the emergence of need/lack of self-regulation.
