= Edinburgh Handedness Inventory =

Measurement scale for handedness

The Edinburgh Handedness Inventory is a measurement scale used to assess the dominance of a person's right or left hand in everyday activities, sometimes referred to as laterality. The inventory can be used by an observer assessing the person, or by a person self-reporting hand use. The latter method tends to be less reliable due to a person over-attributing tasks to the dominant hand.

The Edinburgh Handedness Inventory was published in 1971 by Richard Carolus Oldfield and has been used in various scientific studies as well as popular literature. According to Google Scholar it has been cited tens of thousands of times. Within the very substantial literature on handedness it is used far more than any rival, such as FLANDERS, or the Annett Hand Preference Questionnaire, which is not good at eliciting either-hand responses.

Nevertheless, profound dissatisfaction with the Inventory has been expressed and statistical analysis of the Inventory has shown that the two-handed items broom and box are poorly correlated with the other eight items, while drawing is too highly correlated with writing to add information. A major revision has been published.

== See also ==
- Ambidexterity
- Cross-dominance
- Handedness
- Laterality
