= Twins and handedness =

Occurrence of hand dominance among twins

Left-handedness always occurs at a lower frequency than right-handedness. Generally, left-handedness is found in 10.6% of the overall population.

Some studies have reported that left-handedness is more common in twins than in singletons, while other studies find no such pattern.

== Twins and singletons left hand prevalence ==
Monozygotic twins also known as identical twins are siblings that share the same genetic information because of their prenatal development. Monozygotic twins result from the fertilization of one egg and the division of that single embryo forming two embryos. However, just because a set of twins share the same genetic information, it does not mean they will exhibit the same traits and behaviors. There are different versions of a gene, which are called alleles. How a gene is expressed depends on the development of an individual throughout their life. Twins, although they come from the same background, experience different things. So due to environmental factors a set of twins, even monozygotic, express genes differently. Handwriting is one of the traits that depend on the environment. For instance, the cerebellum, located in the hind brain, is responsible for motor movements such as handwriting. It uses sensory information from external environments to control physical movements. Taking this into account, it is reasonable to infer that there would be no correlation between twins and handwriting; however, there is a higher prevalence of left-handedness in twins compared to singletons. Referencing the mean proportions of left-handedness, singletons are 8.5%, dizygotic twins are 14% and monozygotic twins are 14.5%. Using this data, it is theorized that twins have higher prevalence for left-handedness because of prenatal complications. For example, the pathological left-handedness syndrome means that an injury occurring during early development can affect lateralization and ultimately handedness. Twins are more prone to perinatal injuries and are statistically more likely to have a premature birth compared to singletons.

== Dizygotic twins and monozygotic twins prevalence for left handedness ==
Unlike monozygotic twins, dizygotic twins result from the fertilization of two eggs by two separate sperms within the same pregnancy. This causes the set of twins to have genetic variations, so their genetic information is unique from one another. In studies conducted between 1924 and 1976, there were more left-handed monozygotic twins. Specifically, 15% of monozygotic twins were left-handed while 13% of dizygotic twins were left-handed. In another study, the frequency of right-handed and left-handed pairs of dizygotic twins is about 23%, while twins with both individuals displaying left-handedness are less than 4% and the frequency of pairs of monozygotic twins in which only one twin is left-handed is about 21% and in which both twins are left-handed is less than 4%. However, there was no difference in the handedness frequency between monozygotic and dizygotic twins.

Currently, there is not much evidence to further prove the idea that monozygotic twins have a higher prevalence for left-handedness using the pathological left-handedness syndrome because of the improvements within medicine causing a decrease in birth defects and complications. In a recent analysis, it was even determined that there is no specific developmental complication that contributes to the higher prevalence of left-handedness between monozygotic and dizygotic twins.

There is no conclusive evidence to support the idea that a certain type of twin may have a higher prevalence of left-handedness because the results from studies conducted contradict one another. Even studies analyzing how gender within monozygotic and dizygotic populations may have a prevalence for left-handedness, some found that males have a higher prevalence while other studies show that gender does not have an impact on handedness. Further studies addressing the topic need to be performed to come to a conclusive answer on whether a type of twin or gender affects handedness. Although there are many theories, such as cerebral symmetry, the reason has not been conclusively proven.

== Chances of handedness ==
If the parents are both right-handed, in dizygotic and monozygotic twins there is a 21% chance of one being left-handed. If one parent is left-handed, in DZ and MZ twins there is a 57% chance of one being left-handed. If both parents are left-handed, it is almost certain one twin will be left-handed.

== Cross-dominance in twins ==
19% of twins are cross-dominant. This is the same for both dizygotic and monozygotic. Cross-dominance is when a dominant eye and dominant hand are different.

== Monozygotic twins: dichorionic and monochorionic and mirror imaging ==
During the early development of monozygotic twins, the time in which the embryo divide has an impact on placentation. If the split of the embryo occurs within three days of fertilization, two individual placentas are formed resulting in monozygotic dichorionic twins. If the split of the embryo occurs between 3 and 12 days after fertilization, a placenta will be shared between the offspring resulting in monozygotic monochorionic twins. Since the zygote of monozygotic monochorionic twins occurs after the establishment of an axis of bilateral symmetry, it was theorized that opposite handedness within the same pair of twins is more frequent than in monozygotic dichorionic twins because of mirror imaging. When in the embryo, after the axis of bilateral symmetry is established, twins are facing each other and would develop traits opposite of one another because their actions are perceived to be matching. However, when comparing the frequency of discordant pairs of handedness, pairs that exhibit opposite handwriting, there was little to no difference in frequency. The frequency of left-handedness in monozygotic dichorionic twins was 22% and the data of frequencies of left-handedness in monozygotic monochorionic twins was 23%. Subsequently, this emphasized that chorion did not affect left-handedness. Similarly, placentation or the placement of the placenta does not affect left-handedness.

== Other factors of handedness ==
- Family history of left-handedness
- Birth stress- forces and injuries of baby's head
- Gestational age
- Sex
- Hair whorl
- Social pressure

== See also ==
- Footedness
