= Haplogroup E-M215 =

Human Y-chromosome DNA haplogroup

Haplogroup: E-M215; E1b1b
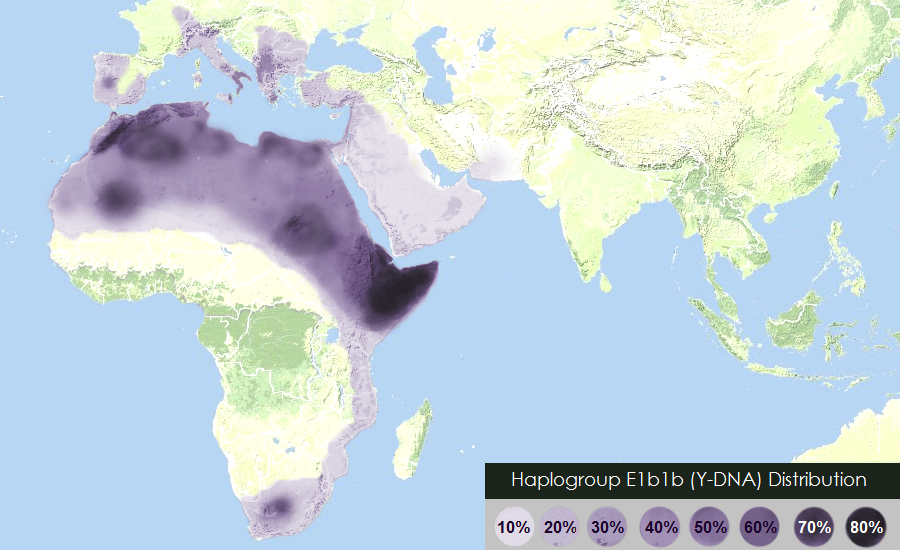
- Geographic distribution of the haplogroup E1b1b
- Possible time of origin: 47,500—22,400 BP
- Coalescence age: 34,800 BP
- Possible place of origin: East Africa
- Ancestor: E-P2
- Descendants: E-M35; E-M281
- Defining mutations: M215

E-M215 or E1b1b, formerly known as E3b, is a major human Y-chromosome DNA haplogroup. E-M215 has two basal branches, E-M35 and E-M281. E-M35 is primarily distributed in North Africa and the Horn of Africa, and occurs at moderate frequencies in the Middle East, Europe, and Southern Africa. E-M281 occurs at a low frequency in Ethiopia.

== Origins ==
The origins of E-M215 were dated by Cruciani in 2007 to about 22,400 years ago in East Africa. (Note: Cruciani et al. (2004): "Several observations point to eastern Africa as the homeland for haplogroup E3b—that is, it had (1) the highest number of different E3b clades (table 1), (2) a high frequency of this haplogroup and a high microsatellite diversity, and, finally, (3) the exclusive presence of the undifferentiated E3b* paragroup." As mentioned above, "E3b" is the old name for E-M215. Semino et al. (2004): "This inference is further supported by the presence of additional Hg E lineal diversification and by the highest frequency of E-P2* and E-M35* in the same region. The distribution of E-P2* appears limited to eastern African peoples. The E-M35* lineage shows its highest frequency (19.2%) in the Ethiopian Oromo but with a wider distribution range than E-P2*." For E-M215 Cruciani et al. (2007) reduced their estimate to 22,400 from 25,600 in Cruciani et al. (2004), re-calibrating the same data.)

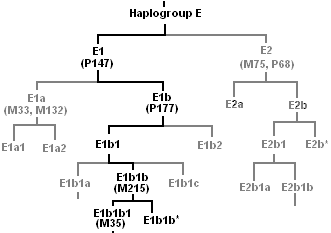
E1b1b1 origins map

== Ancient DNA ==
According to Lazaridis et al. (2016), Natufian skeletal remains from the ancient Levant predominantly carried the Y-DNA haplogroup E1b1b. Of the five Natufian specimens analyzed for paternal lineages, three belonged to the E1b1b1b2(xE1b1b1b2a, E1b1b1b2b), E1b1(xE1b1a1, E1b1b1b1) and E1b1b1b2(xE1b1b1b2a, E1b1b1b2b) subclades (60%). Haplogroup E1b1b was also found at moderate frequencies among fossils from the ensuing Pre-Pottery Neolithic B culture, with the E1b1b1 and E1b1b1b2(xE1b1b1b2a, E1b1b1b2b) subclades observed in two of seven PPNB specimens (~29%). The scientists suggest that the Levantine early farmers may have spread southward into East Africa, bringing along Western Eurasian and Basal Eurasian ancestral components separate from that which would arrive later in North Africa.

Additionally, haplogroup E1b1b1 has been found in an ancient Egyptian mummy excavated at the Abusir el-Meleq archaeological site in Middle Egypt, which dates from a period between the late New Kingdom and the Roman era. Fossils at the Iberomaurusian site of Ifri N'Amr Ou Moussa in Morocco, which have been dated to around 5,000 BCE, also carried haplotypes related to the E1b1b1b1a (E-M81) subclade. These ancient individuals bore an autochthonous Maghrebi genomic component that peaks among modern North Africans, indicating that they were ancestral to populations in the area. The E1b1b haplogroup has likewise been observed in ancient Guanche fossils excavated in Gran Canaria and Tenerife on the Canary Islands, which have been radiocarbon-dated to between the 7th and 11th centuries CE. The clade-bearing individuals that were analysed for paternal DNA were inhumed at the Tenerife site, with all of these specimens found to belong to the E1b1b1b1a1 or E-M183 subclade (3/3; 100%).

Loosdrecht et al. (2018) analysed genome-wide data from seven ancient Iberomaurusian individuals from the Grotte des Pigeons near Taforalt in eastern Morocco. The fossils were directly dated to between 15,100 and 13,900 calibrated years before present. The scientists found that five male specimens with sufficient nuclear DNA preservation belonged to the E1b1b1a1 (M78) subclade, with one skeleton bearing the E1b1b1a1b1 parent lineage to E-V13, another male specimen belonged to E1b1b (M215*). Martiniano et al. (2022) later reassigned all the Taforalt samples to haplogroup E-M78 and none to E-L618, the predecessor to E-V13.

== Distribution ==
In Africa, E-M215 is distributed in highest frequencies in the Horn of Africa and North Africa, specifically in the countries Somalia and Morocco, whence it has in recent millennia expanded as far south as South Africa, and northwards into Western Asia and Europe (especially the Mediterranean and the Balkans). E-M281 has been found in Ethiopia.

Almost all E-M215 men are also in E-M35. In 2004, M215 was found to be older than M35 when individuals were found who have the M215 mutation, but do not have M35 mutation. In 2013, Di Cristofaro et al. (2013) found one individual in Khorasan, North-East Iran to be positive for M215 but negative for M35.

E-M215 and E-M35 are quite common among Afroasiatic speakers. The linguistic group and carriers of E-M35 lineage have a high probability to have arisen and dispersed together from the Afroasiatic Urheimat. Amongst populations with an Afro-Asiatic speaking history, a significant proportion of Jewish male lineages are E-M35. Haplogroup E-M35, which accounts for approximately 18% to 20% of Ashkenazi and 8.6% to 30% of Sephardi Y-chromosomes, appears to be one of the major founding lineages of the Jewish population. (Note: "Paragroup E-M35 * and haplogroup J-12f2a* fit the criteria for major AJ founding lineages because they are widespread both in AJ populations and in Near Eastern populations, and occur at much lower frequencies in European non-Jewish populations." Behar et al. (2004))

=== E-M215 association with endurance ===
Moran et al. (2004) observed that among Y-DNA (paternal) clades borne by elite endurance athletes in Ethiopia, the haplogroup E3b1 was negatively correlated with elite athletic endurance performance, whereas the haplogroups E*, E3*, K*(xP), and J*(xJ2) were significantly more frequent among the elite endurance athletes.

== Subclades ==
=== E-M35 ===
Haplogroup E-M35 is a subclade of E-M215.

=== E-M281 ===
Haplogroup E-M281 is a subclade of E-M215.

== Phylogenetics ==
=== Phylogenetic history ===
Prior to 2002, there were in academic literature at least seven naming systems for the Y-Chromosome phylogenetic tree. This led to considerable confusion. In 2002, the major research groups came together and formed the Y-Chromosome Consortium (YCC). They published a joint paper that created a single new tree that all agreed to use. Later, a group of citizen scientists with an interest in population genetics and genetic genealogy formed a working group to create an amateur tree aiming at being above all timely. The table below brings together all of these works at the point of the landmark 2002 YCC Tree. This allows a researcher reviewing older published literature to quickly move between nomenclatures.

YCC 2002/2008 (Shorthand)	(α)	(β)	(γ)	(δ)	(ε)	(ζ)	(η)	YCC 2002 (Longhand)	YCC 2005 (Longhand)	YCC 2008 (Longhand)	YCC 2010r (Longhand)	ISOGG 2006	ISOGG 2007	ISOGG 2008	ISOGG 2009	ISOGG 2010	ISOGG 2011	ISOGG 2012
E-P29	21	III	3A	13	Eu3	H2	B	E*	E	E	E	E	E	E	E	E	E	E
E-M33	21	III	3A	13	Eu3	H2	B	E1*	E1	E1a	E1a	E1	E1	E1a	E1a	E1a	E1a	E1a
E-M44	21	III	3A	13	Eu3	H2	B	E1a	E1a	E1a1	E1a1	E1a	E1a	E1a1	E1a1	E1a1	E1a1	E1a1
E-M75	21	III	3A	13	Eu3	H2	B	E2a	E2	E2	E2	E2	E2	E2	E2	E2	E2	E2
E-M54	21	III	3A	13	Eu3	H2	B	E2b	E2b	E2b	E2b1	-	-	-	-	-	-	-
E-P2	25	III	4	14	Eu3	H2	B	E3*	E3	E1b	E1b1	E3	E3	E1b1	E1b1	E1b1	E1b1	E1b1
E-M2	8	III	5	15	Eu2	H2	B	E3a*	E3a	E1b1	E1b1a	E3a	E3a	E1b1a	E1b1a	E1b1a	E1b1a1	E1b1a1
E-M58	8	III	5	15	Eu2	H2	B	E3a1	E3a1	E1b1a1	E1b1a1	E3a1	E3a1	E1b1a1	E1b1a1	E1b1a1	E1b1a1a1a	E1b1a1a1a
E-M116.2	8	III	5	15	Eu2	H2	B	E3a2	E3a2	E1b1a2	E1b1a2	E3a2	E3a2	E1b1a2	E1b1a2	E1ba12	removed	removed
E-M149	8	III	5	15	Eu2	H2	B	E3a3	E3a3	E1b1a3	E1b1a3	E3a3	E3a3	E1b1a3	E1b1a3	E1b1a3	E1b1a1a1c	E1b1a1a1c
E-M154	8	III	5	15	Eu2	H2	B	E3a4	E3a4	E1b1a4	E1b1a4	E3a4	E3a4	E1b1a4	E1b1a4	E1b1a4	E1b1a1a1g1c	E1b1a1a1g1c
E-M155	8	III	5	15	Eu2	H2	B	E3a5	E3a5	E1b1a5	E1b1a5	E3a5	E3a5	E1b1a5	E1b1a5	E1b1a5	E1b1a1a1d	E1b1a1a1d
E-M10	8	III	5	15	Eu2	H2	B	E3a6	E3a6	E1b1a6	E1b1a6	E3a6	E3a6	E1b1a6	E1b1a6	E1b1a6	E1b1a1a1e	E1b1a1a1e
E-M35	25	III	4	14	Eu4	H2	B	E3b*	E3b	E1b1b1	E1b1b1	E3b1	E3b1	E1b1b1	E1b1b1	E1b1b1	removed	removed
E-M78	25	III	4	14	Eu4	H2	B	E3b1*	E3b1	E1b1b1a	E1b1b1a1	E3b1a	E3b1a	E1b1b1a	E1b1b1a	E1b1b1a	E1b1b1a1	E1b1b1a1
E-M148	25	III	4	14	Eu4	H2	B	E3b1a	E3b1a	E1b1b1a3a	E1b1b1a1c1	E3b1a3a	E3b1a3a	E1b1b1a3a	E1b1b1a3a	E1b1b1a3a	E1b1b1a1c1	E1b1b1a1c1
E-M81	25	III	4	14	Eu4	H2	B	E3b2*	E3b2	E1b1b1b	E1b1b1b1	E3b1b	E3b1b	E1b1b1b	E1b1b1b	E1b1b1b	E1b1b1b1	E1b1b1b1a
E-M107	25	III	4	14	Eu4	H2	B	E3b2a	E3b2a	E1b1b1b1	E1b1b1b1a	E3b1b1	E3b1b1	E1b1b1b1	E1b1b1b1	E1b1b1b1	E1b1b1b1a	E1b1b1b1a1
E-M165	25	III	4	14	Eu4	H2	B	E3b2b	E3b2b	E1b1b1b2	E1b1b1b1b1	E3b1b2	E3b1b2	E1b1b1b2a	E1b1b1b2a	E1b1b1b2a	E1b1b1b2a	E1b1b1b1a2a
E-M123	25	III	4	14	Eu4	H2	B	E3b3*	E3b3	E1b1b1c	E1b1b1c	E3b1c	E3b1c	E1b1b1c	E1b1b1c	E1b1b1c	E1b1b1c	E1b1b1b2a
E-M34	25	III	4	14	Eu4	H2	B	E3b3a*	E3b3a	E1b1b1c1	E1b1b1c1	E3b1c1	E3b1c1	E1b1b1c1	E1b1b1c1	E1b1b1c1	E1b1b1c1	E1b1b1b2a1
E-M136	25	III	4	14	Eu4	H2	B	E3ba1	E3b3a1	E1b1b1c1a	E1b1b1c1a1	E3b1c1a	E3b1c1a	E1b1b1c1a1	E1b1b1c1a1	E1b1b1c1a1	E1b1b1c1a1	E1b1b1b2a1a1

==== Research publications ====
The following research teams per their publications were represented in the creation of the YCC Tree.

- α Jobling & Tyler-Smith (2000) and Kaladjieva (2001)
- β Underhill (2000)
- γ Hammer (2001)
- δ Karafet (2001)
- ε Semino (2000)
- ζ Su (1999)
- η Capelli (2001)

==== Discussion ====
E-M215 and E1b1b1 are the currently accepted names found in the proposals of the Y Chromosome Consortium (YCC), for the clades defined by mutation M215 and M35 respectively, which can also be referred to as E-M215 and E-M35. The nomenclature E3b (E-M215) and E3b1 (E-M35) respectively were the YCC defined names used to designate the same haplogroups in older literature with E-M35 branching as a separate subclade of E-M215 in 2004. Prior to 2002 these haplogroups were not designated in a consistent way, and nor was their relationship to other related clades within haplogroup E and haplogroup DE. But in non-standard or older terminologies, E-M215 is for example approximately the same as "haplotype V", still used in publications such as Gérard et al. (2006).

==== Phylogenetic trees ====
Cladogram with the main subclades:

- E1b1b (M215)
  - E1b1b1 (M35)
    - E1b1b1a (V68)
      - E-M78
        - E-V12
        - E-V65
        - E-V13
        - E-V22
      - E-V2729
    - E1b1b1b (Z827)
      - E-M81
      - E-M123
  - E1b1b2 (M281)

The following phylogenetic tree is based on the YCC 2008 tree and subsequent published research as summarized by ISOGG. It includes all known subclades as of June 2015 (Trombetta et al. 2015)

- E-M215 (E1b1b)
  - E-M215*. Rare or non-existent.
  - E-M35 (E1b1b1)
    - E-V68 (E1b1b1a)
      - E-V2009. Found in individuals in Sardinia and Morocco.
      - E-M78 (E1b1b1a1). North Africa, Horn of Africa, West Asia, Sicily. (Formerly "E1b1b1a".)
        - E-M78*
        - E-V1477. Found in Tunisian Jews.
        - E-V1083.
          - E-V1083*. Found only in Eritrea (1.1%) and Sardinia (0.3%).
          - E-V13
          - E-V22
        - E-V1129
          - E-V12
            - E-V12*
            - E-V32
          - E-V264
            - E-V259. Found in North Cameroon.
            - E-V65
              - E-CTS194
    - E-Z827 (E1b1b1b)
      - E-V257/L19 (L19, V257) – E1b1b1b1
        - E-PF2431
        - E-M81 (M81)
          - E-PF2546
            - E-PF2546*
            - E-CTS12227
              - E-MZ11
                - E-MZ12
            - E-A929
              - E-Z5009
                - E-Z5009*
                - E-Z5010
                - E-Z5013
                  - E-Z5013*
                  - E-A1152
              - E-A2227
                - E-A428
                - E-MZ16
              - E-PF6794
                - E-PF6794*
                - E-PF6789
                  - E-MZ21
                  - E-MZ23
                  - E-MZ80
              - E-A930
              - E-Z2198/E-MZ46
                - E-A601
                - E-L351
      - E-Z830 (Z830) – E1b1b1b2
        - E-M123 (M123)
          - E-M34 (M34)
            - E-M84 (M84)
              - E-M136 (M136)
            - E-M290 (M290)
            - E-V23 (V23)
            - E-L791 (L791, L792)
        - E-V1515. E-V1515 and its subclades are mainly restricted to eastern Africa.
          - E-V1515*
          - E-V1486
            - E-V1486*
            - E-V2881
              - E-V2881*
              - E-V1792
              - E-V92
            - E-M293 (M293)
              - E-M293*
              - E-P72 (P72)
              - E-V3065*
          - E-V1700
            - E-V42 (V42)
            - E-V1785
              - E-V1785*
              - E-V6 (V6)
    - E-V16/E-M281 (E1b1b2). Rare. Found in individuals in Ethiopia, Yemen and Saudi Arabia.

== See also ==
=== Genetics ===
- African admixture in Europe
- genetic genealogy
- Haplogroup D
- Haplogroup DE
- Haplogroup
- Haplotype
- Human Y-chromosome DNA haplogroup
- Molecular phylogenetics
- Paragroup
- Subclade
- Y-chromosome haplogroups in populations of the world
- Y-DNA haplogroups by ethnic group
- Y-DNA haplogroups in populations of Sub-Saharan Africa

=== Y-DNA E subclades ===
- Haplogroup E-L485
- Haplogroup E-M123
- Haplogroup E-M180
- Haplogroup E-M215
- Haplogroup E-M33
- Haplogroup E-M521
- Haplogroup E-M75
- Haplogroup E-M96
- Haplogroup E-P147
- Haplogroup E-P177
- Haplogroup E-P2
- Haplogroup E-V12
- Haplogroup E-V13
- Haplogroup E-V22
- Haplogroup E-M2
- Haplogroup E-V65
- Haplogroup E-V68
- Haplogroup E-Z820
- Haplogroup E-Z827

== Bibliography ==
- Adams, Susan M; Bosch, Elena; Balaresque, Patricia L.; Ballereau, Stéphane J.; Lee, Andrew C.; Arroyo, Eduardo; López-Parra, Ana M.; Aler, Mercedes; et al. (2008), "The Genetic Legacy of Religious Diversity and Intolerance: Paternal Lineages of Christians, Jews, and Muslims in the Iberian Peninsula", The American Journal of Human Genetics, 83 (6): 725–36, doi:10.1016/j.ajhg.2008.11.007, PMC 2668061, PMID 19061982
- Alvarez; Santos, Cristina; Montiel, Rafael; Caeiro, Blazquez; Baali, Abdellatif; Dugoujon, Jean-Michel; Aluja, Maria Pilar (2009), "Y-chromosome variation in South Iberia: Insights into the North African contribution", American Journal of Human Biology, 21 (3): 407–409, doi:10.1002/ajhb.20888, PMID 19213004, S2CID 7041905
- Arredi, B; Poloni, E; Paracchini, S; Zerjal, T; Fathallah, D; Makrelouf, M; Pascali, V; Novelletto, A; Tylersmith, C (2004), "A Predominantly Neolithic Origin for Y-Chromosomal DNA Variation in North Africa", American Journal of Human Genetics, 75 (2): 338–345, doi:10.1086/423147, PMC 1216069, PMID 15202071
- Badro, Danielle A.; Douaihy, Bouchra; Haber, Marc; Youhanna, Sonia C.; Salloum, Angélique; Ghassibe-Sabbagh, Michella; Johnsrud, Brian; Khazen, Georges; Matisoo-Smith, Elizabeth; Soria-Hernanz, David F.; Wells, R. Spencer; Tyler-Smith, Chris; Platt, Daniel E.; Zalloua, Pierre A. (2013), "Y-Chromosome and mtDNA Genetics Reveal Significant Contrasts in Affinities of Modern Middle Eastern Populations with European and African Populations", PLOS ONE, 8 (1: e54616) e54616, Bibcode:2013PLoSO...854616B, doi:10.1371/journal.pone.0054616, PMC 3559847, PMID 23382925
- Battaglia, Vincenza; Fornarino, Simona; Al-Zahery, Nadia; Olivieri, Anna; Pala, Maria; Myres, Natalie M; King, Roy J; Rootsi, Siiri; et al. (2008), "Y-chromosomal evidence of the cultural diffusion of agriculture in southeast Europe", European Journal of Human Genetics, 17 (6): 820–830, doi:10.1038/ejhg.2008.249, PMC 2947100, PMID 19107149
- Behar, Doron M.; Thomas, Mark G.; Skorecki, Karl; Hammer, Michael F.; Bulygina, Ekaterina; Rosengarten, Dror; Jones, Abigail L.; Held, Karen; et al. (October 2003), "Multiple Origins of Ashkenazi Levites: Y Chromosome Evidence for Both Near Eastern and European Ancestries", Am. J. Hum. Genet., vol. 73, no. 4, pp. 768–779, doi:10.1086/378506, PMC 1180600, PMID 13680527. Also at http://www.ucl.ac.uk/tcga/tcgapdf/Behar-AJHG-03.pdf and https://web.archive.org/web/20090304100321/http://www.familytreedna.com/pdf/400971.pdf
- Behar; Garrigan; Kaplan; Mobasher; Rosengarten (November 2004), "Contrasting patterns of Y chromosome variation in Ashkenazi Jewish and host non-Jewish European populations" (PDF), Hum. Genet., vol. 114, no. 4, pp. 354–365, doi:10.1007/s00439-003-1073-7, PMID 14740294, S2CID 10310338, archived from the original (PDF) on 2011-11-10
- Beleza, Sandra; Gusmao, Leonor; Lopes, Alexandra; Alves, Cintia; Gomes, Iva; Giouzeli, Maria; Calafell, Francesc; Carracedo, Angel; Amorim, Antonio (2006), "Micro-Phylogeographic and Demographic History of Portuguese Male Lineages", Annals of Human Genetics, 70 (2): 181–194, doi:10.1111/j.1529-8817.2005.00221.x, PMID 16626329, S2CID 4652154
- Bird, Steven (2007), "Haplogroup E3b1a2 as a Possible Indicator of Settlement in Roman Britain by Soldiers of Balkan Origin", Journal of Genetic Genealogy, 3 (2), archived from the original on 2016-04-22
- Bortolini; Thomas, Mark G.; Chikhi, Lourdes; Aguilar, Juan A.; Castro-De-Guerra, Dinorah; Salzano, Francisco M.; Ruiz-Linares, Andres (2004), "Ribeiro's typology, genomes, and Spanish colonialism, as viewed from Gran Canaria and Colombia" (PDF), Genetics and Molecular Biology, 27 (1): 1–8, doi:10.1590/S1415-47572004000100001
- Bosch, Elena; Calafell, Francesc; Comas, David; Oefner, Peter J.; Underhill, Peter A.; Bertranpetit, Jaume (2001), "High-resolution analysis of human Y-chromosome variation shows a sharp discontinuity and limited gene flow between north-western Africa and the Iberian Peninsula", Am J Hum Genet, 68 (4): 1019–1029, doi:10.1086/319521, PMC 1275654, PMID 11254456
- Bosch, E.; Calafell, F.; Gonzalez-Neira, A.; Flaiz, C.; Mateu, E.; Scheil, H.-G.; Huckenbeck, W.; Efremovska, L.; et al. (2006), "Paternal and maternal lineages in the Balkans show a homogeneous landscape over linguistic barriers, except for the isolated Aromuns", Annals of Human Genetics, 70 (4): 459–487, doi:10.1111/j.1469-1809.2005.00251.x, PMID 16759179, S2CID 23156886
- Cadenas; Zhivotovsky, Lev A; Cavalli-Sforza, Luca L; Underhill, Peter A; Herrera, Rene J (2007), "Y-chromosome diversity characterizes the Gulf of Oman", European Journal of Human Genetics, 16 (3): 1–13, doi:10.1038/sj.ejhg.5201934, PMID 17928816
- Capelli, Cristian; Redhead, Nicola; Abernethy, Julia K.; Gratrix, Fiona; Wilson, James F.; Moen, Torolf; Hervig, Tor; Richards, Martin; et al. (2003), "A Y Chromosome Census of the British Isles", Current Biology, 13 (11): 979–84, Bibcode:2003CBio...13..979C, doi:10.1016/S0960-9822(03)00373-7, hdl:20.500.11820/8acb01f3-a7c1-45f5-89de-b796266d651e, PMID 12781138 also at
- Caratti; Gino, S.; Torre, C.; Robino, C. (2009), "Subtyping of Y-chromosomal haplogroup E-M78 (E1b1b1a) by SNP assay and its forensic application", International Journal of Legal Medicine, 123 (4): 357–360, doi:10.1007/s00414-009-0350-y, PMID 19430804, S2CID 5657112
- Capelli, Cristian; Onofri, Valerio; Brisighelli, Francesca; Boschi, Ilaria; Scarnicci, Francesca; Masullo, Mara; Ferri, Gianmarco; Tofanelli, Sergio; et al. (2009), "Moors and Saracens in Europe: estimating the medieval North African male legacy in southern Europe", European Journal of Human Genetics, 17 (6): 848–852, doi:10.1038/ejhg.2008.258, PMC 2947089, PMID 19156170
- Cinnioğlu, Cengiz; King, Roy; Kivisild, Toomas; Kalfoglu, Ersi; Atasoy, Sevil; Cavalleri, Gianpiero L.; Lillie, Anita S.; Roseman, Charles C.; et al. (2004), "Excavating Y-chromosome haplotype strata in Anatolia", Hum Genet, 114 (2): 127–48, doi:10.1007/s00439-003-1031-4, PMID 14586639, S2CID 10763736
- Contu, Daniela; Morelli, Daniela; Santoni, Federico; Foster, Jamie W.; Francalacci, Paolo; Cucca, Francesco (2008), "Y-Chromosome Based Evidence for Pre-Neolithic Origin of the Genetically Homogeneous but Diverse Sardinian Population: Inference for Association Scans", PLOS ONE, 3 (1) e1430, Bibcode:2008PLoSO...3.1430C, doi:10.1371/journal.pone.0001430, PMC 2174525, PMID 18183308
- Cruciani, Fulvio; Santolamazza, Piero; Shen, Peidong; MacAulay, Vincent; Moral, Pedro; Olckers, Antonel; Modiano, David; Holmes, Susan (2002), "A Back Migration from Asia to Sub-Saharan Africa Is Supported by High-Resolution Analysis of Human Y-Chromosome Haplotypes", American Journal of Human Genetics, 70 (5): 1197–1214, Bibcode:2002AmJHG..70.1197C, doi:10.1086/340257, PMC 447595, PMID 11910562
- Cruciani; La Fratta; Santolamazza; Sellitto (May 2004), "Phylogeographic Analysis of Haplogroup E3b (E-M215) Y Chromosomes Reveals Multiple Migratory Events Within and Out Of Africa" (PDF), American Journal of Human Genetics, 74 (5): 1014–1022, doi:10.1086/386294, PMC 1181964, PMID 15042509, archived from the original (PDF) on 2008-06-26
- Cruciani; La Fratta; Torroni; Underhill; Scozzari (2006), "Molecular Dissection of the Y Chromosome Haplogroup E-M78 (E3b1a): A Posteriori Evaluation of a Microsatellite-Network-Based Approach Through Six New Biallelic Markers", Human Mutation, 27 (8): 831–2, doi:10.1002/humu.9445, PMID 16835895, S2CID 26886757
- Cruciani, F.; La Fratta, R.; Trombetta, B.; Santolamazza, P.; Sellitto, D.; Colomb, E. B.; Dugoujon, J.-M.; Crivellaro, F.; et al. (2007), "Tracing Past Human Male Movements in Northern/Eastern Africa and Western Eurasia: New Clues from Y-Chromosomal Haplogroups E-M78 and J-M12", Molecular Biology and Evolution, 24 (6): 1300–1311, doi:10.1093/molbev/msm049, PMID 17351267 Also see Supplementary Data.
- Di Gaetano; Cerutti, Francesca; Crobu, Carlo; Robino (2009), "Differential Greek and northern African migrations to Sicily are supported by genetic evidence from the Y chromosome", European Journal of Human Genetics, 17 (1): 91–99, doi:10.1038/ejhg.2008.120, PMC 2985948, PMID 18685561
- Dugoujon; Coudray; Torroni; Cruciani; Scozzari; Moral; Louali; Kossmann (2009), "The Berber and the Berbers: Genetic and linguistic diversities" (PDF), in d'Errico; Hombert (eds.), Becoming Eloquent Advances in the Emergence of Language, Human Cognition, and Modern Cultures, pp. 123–146, doi:10.1075/z.152.05ch4, ISBN 978-90-272-3269-4, archived from the original (PDF) on 2016-10-19
- Ehret, C.; Keita, SO; Newman, P (2004), "The Origins of Afroasiatic", Science, 306 (5702): 1680, doi:10.1126/science.306.5702.1680c, hdl:2022/21062, PMID 15576591, S2CID 8057990
- El-Sibai, Mirvat; Platt, Daniel E.; Haber, Marc; Xue, Yali; Youhanna, Sonia C.; Wells, R. Spencer; Izaabel, Hassan; Sanyoura, May F.; et al. (2009), "Geographical Structure of the Y-chromosomal Genetic Landscape of the Levant: A coastal-inland contrast", Annals of Human Genetics, 73 (6): 568–581, doi:10.1111/j.1469-1809.2009.00538.x, PMC 3312577, PMID 19686289
- Firasat; Khaliq, Shagufta; Mohyuddin, Aisha; Papaioannou, Myrto; Tyler-Smith, Chris; Underhill, Peter A; Ayub, Qasim (2006), "Y-chromosomal evidence for a limited Greek contribution to the Pathan population of Pakistan", European Journal of Human Genetics, 15 (1): 121–126, doi:10.1038/sj.ejhg.5201726, PMC 2588664, PMID 17047675
- Flores, Carlos; Maca-Meyer, Nicole; González, Ana M; Oefner, Peter J; Shen, Peidong; Pérez, Jose A; Rojas, Antonio; Larruga, Jose M; Underhill, Peter A (2004), "Reduced genetic structure of the Iberian peninsula revealed by Y-chromosome analysis: implications for population demography", European Journal of Human Genetics, 12 (10): 855–863, doi:10.1038/sj.ejhg.5201225, PMID 15280900, S2CID 16765118
- Flores; Maca-Meyer, Nicole; Larruga, Jose M.; Cabrera, Vicente M.; Karadsheh, Naif; Gonzalez, Ana M. (2005), "Isolates in a corridor of migrations: a high-resolution analysis of Y-chromosome variation in Jordan", J Hum Genet, 50 (9): 435–441, doi:10.1007/s10038-005-0274-4, PMID 16142507
- Francalacci, P.; Morelli, L.; Underhill, P.A.; Lillie, A.S.; Passarino, G.; Useli, A.; Madeddu, R.; Paoli, G.; et al. (2003), "Peopling of Three Mediterranean Islands (Corsica, Sardinia, and Sicily) Inferred by Y-Chromosome Biallelic Variability", American Journal of Physical Anthropology, 121 (3): 270–279, Bibcode:2003AJPA..121..270F, doi:10.1002/ajpa.10265, PMID 12772214
- Fregel, Rosa; Gomes, Verónica; Gusmão, Leonor; González, Ana M; Cabrera, Vicente M; Amorim, António; Larruga, Jose M (2009), "Demographic history of Canary Islands male gene-pool: replacement of native lineages by European", BMC Evolutionary Biology, 9 (1): 181, Bibcode:2009BMCEE...9..181F, doi:10.1186/1471-2148-9-181, PMC 2728732, PMID 19650893
- Gérard; Berriche, S; Aouizérate, A; Diéterlen, F; Lucotte, G (2006), "North African Berber and Arab influences in the western Mediterranean revealed by Y-chromosome DNA haplotypes", Human Biology, 78 (3): 307–316, doi:10.1353/hub.2006.0045, PMID 17216803, S2CID 13347549
- Gonçalves, R; Freitas, A; Branco, M; Rosa, A; Fernandes, AT; Zhivotovsky, LA; Underhill, PA; Kivisild, T; Brehm, A (2005), "Y-chromosome Lineages from Portugal, Madeira and Açores Record Elements of Sephardim and Berber Ancestry", Annals of Human Genetics, 69 (Pt 4): 443–454, doi:10.1111/j.1529-8817.2005.00161.x, hdl:10400.13/3018, PMID 15996172, S2CID 3229760
- Hammer (2003), "Human population structure and its effects on sampling Y chromosome sequence variation", Genetics, 164 (4): 1495–1509, doi:10.1093/genetics/164.4.1495, PMC 1462677, PMID 12930755
- Hassan, Hisham Y.; Underhill, Peter A.; Cavalli-Sforza, Luca L.; Ibrahim, Muntaser E. (2008), "Y-Chromosome Variation Among Sudanese: Restricted Gene Flow, Concordance With Language, Geography, and History" (PDF), American Journal of Physical Anthropology, 137 (3): 316–23, Bibcode:2008AJPA..137..316H, doi:10.1002/ajpa.20876, PMID 18618658, archived from the original (PDF) on 2009-03-04
- Henn, B. M.; Gignoux, C.; Lin, Alice A; Oefner, Peter J.; Shen, P.; Scozzari, R.; Cruciani, F.; Tishkoff, S. A.; Mountain, J. L.; Underhill, P. A. (2008), "Y-chromosomal evidence of a pastoralist migration through Tanzania to southern Africa", PNAS, 105 (31): 10693–8, Bibcode:2008PNAS..10510693H, doi:10.1073/pnas.0801184105, PMC 2504844, PMID 18678889. See comment on Dienekes blog, comment on the Spitoon blog and public release Archived 2021-05-08 at the Wayback Machine.
- Y-DNA Haplogroup E and its Subclades – 2011, International Society of Genetic Genealogy (ISOGG), 2011
- Jobling, M.A.; Tyler-Smith, C. (2000), "New uses for new haplotypes the human Y chromosome, disease and selection", Trends Genet., 16 (8): 356–362, doi:10.1016/S0168-9525(00)02057-6, PMID 10904265
- Karafet, T. M.; Mendez, F. L.; Meilerman, M. B.; Underhill, P. A.; Zegura, S. L.; Hammer, M. F. (May 2008), "New Binary Polymorphisms Reshape and Increase Resolution of the Human Y-Chromosomal Haplogroup Tree", Genome Research, 18 (5): 830–8, doi:10.1101/gr.7172008, PMC 2336805, PMID 18385274. Published online April 2, 2008. See also Supplementary Material.
- Keita, Shomarka (2008), "Geography, selected Afro-Asiatic families, and Y chromosome lineage variation", In Hot Pursuit of Language in Prehistory: Essays in the Four Fields of Anthropology: In Honor of Harold Crane Fleming, John Benjamins, ISBN 978-90-272-3252-6
- Keita, S. O. Y.; Boyce, A. J. (Anthony J.) (2005), "Genetics, Egypt, and History: Interpreting Geographical Patterns of Y Chromosome Variation", History in Africa, 32: 221–246, doi:10.1353/hia.2005.0013, S2CID 163020672
- King, R. J.; Özcan, S. S.; Carter, T.; Kalfoğlu, E.; Atasoy, S.; Triantaphyllidis, C.; Kouvatsi, A.; Lin, A. A.; et al. (2008), "Differential Y-chromosome Anatolian Influences on the Greek and Cretan Neolithic" (PDF), Annals of Human Genetics, 72 (2): 205–214, doi:10.1111/j.1469-1809.2007.00414.x, PMID 18269686, S2CID 22406638, archived from the original (PDF) on 2009-03-05
- King; Underhill (2002), "Congruent distribution of Neolithic painted pottery and ceramic figurines with Y-chromosome lineages", Antiquity, 76 (293): 707–14, doi:10.1017/S0003598X00091158, S2CID 160359661
- Kujanova; Pereira; Fernandes; Pereira; Cerný (2009), "Near Eastern Neolithic Genetic Input in a Small Oasis of the Egyptian Western Desert", American Journal of Physical Anthropology, 140 (2): 336–346, Bibcode:2009AJPA..140..336K, doi:10.1002/ajpa.21078, PMID 19425100
- Lacan, Marie; Keyser, Christine; Ricaut, François-Xavier; Brucato, Nicolas; Tarrús, Josep; Bosch, Angel; Guilaine, Jean; Crubézy, Eric; Ludes, Bertrand (2011), "Ancient DNA suggests the leading role played by men in the Neolithic dissemination", PNAS, 108 (45): 18255–9, Bibcode:2011PNAS..10818255L, doi:10.1073/pnas.1113061108, PMC 3215063, PMID 22042855
- Lancaster, Andrew (2009), "Y Haplogroups, Archaeological Cultures and Language Families: a Review of the Multidisciplinary Comparisons using the case of E-M35" (PDF), Journal of Genetic Genealogy, 5 (1), archived from the original (PDF) on 2016-05-06
- Luis, J; Rowold, D; Regueiro, M; Caeiro, B; Cinnioglu, C; Roseman, C; Underhill, P; Cavallisforza, L; Herrera, R (2004), "The Levant versus the Horn of Africa: Evidence for Bidirectional Corridors of Human Migrations" (PDF), American Journal of Human Genetics, 74 (3): 532–544, doi:10.1086/382286, PMC 1182266, PMID 14973781, archived from the original (PDF) on 2012-02-16. (Also see Errata)
- Maca-Meyer N, Sánchez-Velasco P, Flores C, Larruga JM, González AM, Oterino A, Leyva-Cobián F, et al. (2003), "Y Chromosome and Mitochondrial DNA Characterization of Pasiegos, a Human Isolate from Cantabria (Spain)", Annals of Human Genetics, 67 (Pt 4): 329–339, CiteSeerX 10.1.1.584.4253, doi:10.1046/j.1469-1809.2003.00045.x, PMID 12914567, S2CID 40355653.
- Martinez, Laisel; Underhill, Peter A; Zhivotovsky, Lev A; Gayden, Tenzin; Moschonas, Nicholas K; Chow, Cheryl-Emiliane T; Conti, Simon; Mamolini, Elisabetta; Cavalli-Sforza, L Luca; Herrera, Rene (April 1, 2007), "Paleolithic Y-haplogroup heritage predominates in a Cretan highland plateau", European Journal of Human Genetics, 15 (4): 485–493, doi:10.1038/sj.ejhg.5201769, ISSN 1018-4813, PMID 17264870
- Mendizabal, Isabel; Sandoval, Karla; Berniell-Lee, Gemma; Calafell, Francesc; Salas, Antonio; Martinez-Fuentes, Antonio; Comas, David (2008), "Genetic origin, admixture, and asymmetry in maternal and paternal human lineages in Cuba", BMC Evol. Biol., 8 (1): 213, Bibcode:2008BMCEE...8..213M, doi:10.1186/1471-2148-8-213, PMC 2492877, PMID 18644108
- Nebel, Almut; Filon, D; Brinkmann, B; Majumder, P; Faerman, M; Oppenheim, A (2001), "The Y Chromosome Pool of Jews as Part of the Genetic Landscape of the Middle East", American Journal of Human Genetics, 69 (5): 1095–1112, doi:10.1086/324070, PMC 1274378, PMID 11573163
- Onofri, Valerio; Alessandrini, Federica; Turchi, Chiara; Pesaresi, Mauro; Buscemi, Loredana; Tagliabracci, Adriano (2006), "Development of multiplex PCRs for evolutionary and forensic applications of 37 human Y chromosome SNPs" (PDF), Forensic Science International, 157 (1): 23–35, doi:10.1016/j.forsciint.2005.03.014, PMID 15896936
- Paracchini; Pearce, CL; Kolonel, LN; Altshuler, D; Henderson, BE; Tyler-Smith, C (2003), "A Y chromosomal influence on prostate cancer risk: the multi-ethnic cohort study", J Med Genet, 40 (11): 815–819, doi:10.1136/jmg.40.11.815, PMC 1735314, PMID 14627670
- Pelotti; Ceccardi, S; Lugaresi, F; Trane, R; Falconi, M; Bini, C; Willuweit, S; Roewer, L (2007), "Microgeographic genetic variation of Y chromosome in a population sample of Ravenna's area in the Emilia-Romagna region (North of Italy)", Forensic Science International: Genetics Supplement Series, 1 (1): 242–243, doi:10.1016/j.fsigss.2007.10.025
- Pereira, Luísa; Černý, Viktor; Cerezo, María; Silva, Nuno M; Hájek, Martin; Vašíková, Alžběta; Kujanová, Martina; Brdička, Radim; Salas, Antonio (2010), "Linking the sub-Saharan and West Eurasian gene pools: maternal and paternal heritage of the Tuareg nomads from the African Sahel" (PDF), European Journal of Human Genetics, 18 (8): 915–923, doi:10.1038/ejhg.2010.21, PMC 2987384, PMID 20234393, archived from the original (PDF) on 2013-05-28
- Peričic, M.; Lauc, LB; Klarić, IM; Rootsi, S; Janićijevic, B; Rudan, I; Terzić, R; Colak, I; et al. (2005), "High-resolution phylogenetic analysis of southeastern Europe traces major episodes of paternal gene flow among Slavic populations", Mol. Biol. Evol., vol. 22, no. 10, pp. 1964–75, doi:10.1093/molbev/msi185, PMID 15944443.
- Pontikos D. "Phylogeographic refinement of haplogroup E" http://dienekes.blogspot.ru/2015/07/phylogeographic-refinement-of.html
- Ramos-Luisa, E.; Blanco-Verea, A.; Brión, M.; Van Huffel, V.; Carracedo, A.; Sánchez-Diz, P. (2009), "Phylogeography of French male lineages (unpublished data 23rd International ISFG Congress)", Forensic Science International, 2: 439–441, doi:10.1016/j.fsigss.2009.09.026, S2CID 85134429
- Regueiro, M.; Cadenas, A.M.; Gayden, T.; Underhill, P.A.; Herrera, R.J. (2006), "Iran: Tricontinental Nexus for Y-Chromosome Driven Migration", Hum Hered, 61 (3): 132–143, doi:10.1159/000093774, PMID 16770078, S2CID 7017701
- Robino, C.; Crobu, F.; Gaetano, C.; Bekada, A.; Benhamamouch, S.; Cerutti, N.; Piazza, A.; Inturri, S.; Torre, C. (2008), "Analysis of Y-chromosomal SNP haplogroups and STR haplotypes in an Algerian population sample", Journal International Journal of Legal Medicine, 122 (3): 251–5, doi:10.1007/s00414-007-0203-5, PMID 17909833, S2CID 11556974
- Rosa, Alexandra; Ornelas, Carolina; Jobling, Mark A; Brehm, António; Villems, Richard (2007), "Y-chromosomal diversity in the population of Guinea-Bissau: a multiethnic perspective", BMC Evolutionary Biology, 7 (1): 124, Bibcode:2007BMCEE...7..124R, doi:10.1186/1471-2148-7-124, PMC 1976131, PMID 17662131
- Rosser, Z; Zerjal, T; Hurles, M; Adojaan, M; Alavantic, D; Amorim, A; Amos, W; Armenteros, M; et al. (2000), "Y-Chromosomal Diversity in Europe Is Clinal and Influenced Primarily by Geography, Rather than by Language", American Journal of Human Genetics, 67 (6): 1526–1543, doi:10.1086/316890, PMC 1287948, PMID 11078479, archived from the original on 2008-05-06
- Sanchez, Juan J; Hallenberg, Charlotte; Børsting, Claus; Hernandez, Alexis; Gorlin, RJ (2005), "High frequencies of Y chromosome lineages characterized by E3b1, DYS19-11, DYS392-12 in Somali males", European Journal of Human Genetics, 13 (7): 856–866, doi:10.1038/sj.ejhg.5201390, PMID 15756297. Published online 9 March 2005
- Scozzari, Rosaria; Cruciani, F; Pangrazio, A; Santolamazza, P; Vona, G; Moral, P; Latini, V; Varesi, L; et al. (2001), "Human Y-Chromosome Variation in the Western Mediterranean Area: Implications for the Peopling of the Region" (PDF), Human Immunology, 62 (9): 871–884, CiteSeerX 10.1.1.408.4857, doi:10.1016/S0198-8859(01)00286-5, PMID 11543889, archived from the original (PDF) on 2012-12-17
- Semino, O.; Passarino, G; Oefner, PJ; Lin, AA; Arbuzova, S; Beckman, LE; De Benedictis, G; Francalacci, P; et al. (2000), "The Genetic Legacy of Paleolithic Homo sapiens sapiens in Extant Europeans: A Y Chromosome Perspective" (PDF), Science, vol. 290, no. 5494, pp. 1155–59, Bibcode:2000Sci...290.1155S, doi:10.1126/science.290.5494.1155, PMID 11073453, archived from the original (PDF) on 2003-11-25.
- Semino; Santachiara-Benerecetti, A. Silvana; Falaschi, Francesco; Cavalli-Sforza, L. Luca; Underhill, Peter A. (2002), "Ethiopians and Khoisan share the deepest clades of the human Y-chromosome phylogeny" (PDF), Am J Hum Genet, vol. 70, no. 1, pp. 265–268, doi:10.1086/338306, PMC 384897, PMID 11719903, archived from the original (PDF) on 2006-03-15
- Semino, Ornella; Magri, Chiara; Benuzzi, Giorgia; Lin, Alice A.; Al-Zahery, Nadia; Battaglia, Vincenza; MacCioni, Liliana; Triantaphyllidis, Costas; et al. (2004), "Origin, Diffusion, and Differentiation of Y-Chromosome Haplogroups E and J: Inferences on the Neolithization of Europe and Later Migratory Events in the Mediterranean Area", American Journal of Human Genetics, vol. 74, no. 5, pp. 1023–1034, Bibcode:2004AmJHG..74.1023S, doi:10.1086/386295, PMC 1181965, PMID 15069642
- Shen, Peidong; Lavi, Tal; Kivisild, Toomas; Chou, Vivian; Sengun, Deniz; Gefel, Dov; Shpirer, Issac; Woolf, Eilon; et al. (2004), "Reconstruction of Patrilineages and Matrilineages of Samaritans and Other Israeli Populations From Y-Chromosome and Mitochondrial DNA Sequence Variation" (PDF), Human Mutation, vol. 24, no. 3, pp. 248–60, doi:10.1002/humu.20077, PMID 15300852, S2CID 1571356, archived from the original (PDF) on 2009-03-05
- Silva; Carvalho, Elizeu; Costa, Guilherme; Tavares, Lígia; Amorim, António; Gusmão, Leonor (2006), "Y-chromosome genetic variation in Rio de Janeiro population", American Journal of Human Biology, 18 (6): 829–837, doi:10.1002/ajhb.20567, PMID 17039481, S2CID 23778828
- Shlush; Behar, Doron M.; Yudkovsky, Guennady; Templeton, Alan; Hadid, Yarin; Basis, Fuad; Hammer, Michael; Itzkovitz, Shalev; Skorecki, Karl (2008), Gemmell, Neil John (ed.), "The Druze: A Population Genetic Refugium of the Near East", PLOS ONE, 3 (5) e2105, Bibcode:2008PLoSO...3.2105S, doi:10.1371/journal.pone.0002105, PMC 2324201, PMID 18461126
- Solé-Morata, Neus; García-Fernández, Carla; Urasin, Vadim; Bekada, Asmahan; Fadhlaoui-Zid, Karima; Zalloua, Pierre; Comas, David; Calafell, Francesc (21 November 2017), "Whole Y-chromosome sequences reveal an extremely recent origin of the most common North African paternal lineage E-M183 (M81)", Scientific Reports, 7 (1): 15941, Bibcode:2017NatSR...715941S, doi:10.1038/s41598-017-16271-y, ISSN 2045-2322, PMC 5698413, PMID 29162904
- Sykes, Bryan (2006), Blood of the Isles: Exploring the Genetic Roots of Our Tribal History, Bantam, ISBN 978-0-593-05652-3
- Tishkoff; Gonder; Henn; Mortensen; Knight (2007), "History of Click-Speaking Populations of Africa Inferred from mtDNA and Y Chromosome Genetic Variation", Mol Biol Evol, 24 (10): 2180–2195, doi:10.1093/molbev/msm155, PMID 17656633, archived from the original on 2011-10-10
- Thomas; Stumpf, M. P.H; Harke, H. (2006), "Evidence for an apartheid-like social structure in early Anglo-Saxon England" (PDF), Proceedings of the Royal Society B, 273 (1601): 2651–2657, doi:10.1098/rspb.2006.3627, PMC 1635457, PMID 17002951, archived from the original (PDF) on 2009-03-05
- Trombetta, Beniamino; Cruciani, Fulvio; Sellitto, Daniele; Scozzari, Rosaria (2011), MacAulay, Vincent (ed.), "A New Topology of the Human Y Chromosome Haplogroup E1b1 (E-P2) Revealed through the Use of Newly Characterized Binary Polymorphisms", PLOS ONE, 6 (1) e16073, Bibcode:2011PLoSO...616073T, doi:10.1371/journal.pone.0016073, PMC 3017091, PMID 21253605
- Trombetta, Beniamino; et al. (July 2015). "Phylogeographic Refinement and Large Scale Genotyping of Human Y Chromosome Haplogroup E Provide New Insights into the Dispersal of Early Pastoralists in the African Continent". Genome Biology and Evolution. 7 (7): 1940–1950. doi:10.1093/gbe/evv118. ISSN 1759-6653. OCLC 5854174538. PMC 4524485. PMID 26108492. S2CID 16352575.
- Underhill, Peter A.; Shen, Peidong; Lin, Alice A.; Jin, Li; Passarino, Giuseppe; Yang, Wei H.; Kauffman, Erin; Bonné-Tamir, Batsheva; et al. (2000), "Y chromosome sequence variation and the history of human populations", Nat Genet, vol. 26, no. 3, pp. 358–361, doi:10.1038/81685, PMID 11062480, S2CID 12893406
- Underhill; Passarino, G.; Lin, A. A.; Shen, P.; Mirazon Lahr, M.; Foley, R. A.; Oefner, P. J.; Cavalli-Sforza, L. L. (2001), "The phylogeography of Y chromosome binary haplotypes and the origins of modern human populations", Ann Hum Genet, vol. 65, no. Pt 1, pp. 43–62, doi:10.1046/j.1469-1809.2001.6510043.x, PMID 11415522, S2CID 9441236
- Underhill (2002), "Inference of Neolithic Population Histories using Y-chromosome Haplotypes", in Bellwood, Peter; Renfrew, A. Colin (eds.), Examining the farming/language dispersal hypothesis, Cambridge: McDonald Institute for Archaeological Research, ISBN 978-1-902937-20-5
- Underhill, Peter A.; Kivisild, Toomas (2007), "Use of Y Chromosome and Mitochondrial DNA Population Structure in Tracing Human Migrations", Annu. Rev. Genet., 41: 539–64, doi:10.1146/annurev.genet.41.110306.130407, PMID 18076332
- Weale, M. E.; Weiss, D. A.; Jager, R. F.; Bradman, N.; Thomas, M. G. (2002), "Y Chromosome Evidence for Anglo-Saxon Mass Migration" (PDF), Mol. Biol. Evol., vol. 19, no. 7, pp. 1008–1021, doi:10.1093/oxfordjournals.molbev.a004160, PMID 12082121, archived from the original (PDF) on 2005-10-29.
- Weale; Shah, T; Jones, AL; Greenhalgh, J; Wilson, JF; Nymadawa, P; Zeitlin, D; Connell, BA; et al. (September 1, 2003), "Rare Deep-Rooting Y Chromosome Lineages in Humans: Lessons for Phylogeography", Genetics, vol. 165, no. 1, pp. 229–234, doi:10.1093/genetics/165.1.229, PMC 1462739, PMID 14504230
- Wood; Stover; Ehret; Destro-Bisol (2005), "Contrasting patterns of Y chromosome and mtDNA variation in Africa: evidence for sex-biased demographic processes", European Journal of Human Genetics, 13 (7): 867–876, doi:10.1038/sj.ejhg.5201408, hdl:11573/238493, PMID 15856073
- Y Chromosome Consortium "YCC" (2002), "A Nomenclature System for the Tree of Human Y-Chromosomal Binary Haplogroups", Genome Research, vol. 12, no. 2, pp. 339–348, doi:10.1101/gr.217602, PMC 155271, PMID 11827954
- Zalloua, Pierre A.; Xue, Yali; Khalife, Jade; Makhoul, Nadine; Debiane, Labib; Platt, Daniel E.; Royyuru, Ajay K.; Herrera, Rene J.; et al. (2008), "Y-Chromosomal Diversity in Lebanon Is Structured by Recent Historical Events", American Journal of Human Genetics, 82 (4): 873–882, doi:10.1016/j.ajhg.2008.01.020, PMC 2427286, PMID 18374297
- Zalloua, Pierre A.; Platt, Daniel E.; El Sibai, Mirvat; Khalife, Jade; Makhoul, Nadine; Haber, Marc; Xue, Yali; Izaabel, Hassan; et al. (2008), "Identifying Genetic Traces of Historical Expansions: Phoenician Footprints in the Mediterranean", The American Journal of Human Genetics, 83 (5): 633–642, doi:10.1016/j.ajhg.2008.10.012, PMC 2668035, PMID 18976729
- Zerjal (1999), The use of Y-chromosomal DNA variation to investigate population history; in Papiha SS, Deka R, Chakraborty R (eds): Genomic diversity: applications in human population genetics, Kluwer Academic/Plenum Publishers, pp. 91–101
- Zhao; Khan, Faisal; Borkar, Minal; Herrera, Rene; Agrawal, Suraksha (2009), "Presence of three different paternal lineages among North Indians: A study of 560 Y chromosomes", Annals of Human Biology, 36 (1): 1–14, doi:10.1080/03014460802558522, PMC 2755252, PMID 19058044

=== Sources for conversion tables ===
- Capelli, Cristian; Wilson, James F.; Richards, Martin; Stumpf, Michael P.H.; et al. (February 2001). "A Predominantly Indigenous Paternal Heritage for the Austronesian-Speaking Peoples of Insular Southeast Asia and Oceania". The American Journal of Human Genetics. 68 (2): 432–443. doi:10.1086/318205. PMC 1235276. PMID 11170891.
- Hammer, Michael F.; Karafet, Tatiana M.; Redd, Alan J.; Jarjanazi, Hamdi; et al. (1 July 2001). "Hierarchical Patterns of Global Human Y-Chromosome Diversity". Molecular Biology and Evolution. 18 (7): 1189–1203. doi:10.1093/oxfordjournals.molbev.a003906. PMID 11420360.
- Kaladjieva, Luba; Calafell, Francesc; Jobling, Mark A; Angelicheva, Dora; et al. (February 2001). "Patterns of inter- and intra-group genetic diversity in the Vlax Roma as revealed by Y chromosome and mitochondrial DNA lineages". European Journal of Human Genetics. 9 (2): 97–104. doi:10.1038/sj.ejhg.5200597. PMID 11313742. S2CID 21432405.
- Karafet, Tatiana; Xu, Liping; Du, Ruofu; Wang, William; et al. (September 2001). "Paternal Population History of East Asia: Sources, Patterns, and Microevolutionary Processes". The American Journal of Human Genetics. 69 (3): 615–628. Bibcode:2001AmJHG..69..615K. doi:10.1086/323299. PMC 1235490. PMID 11481588.
- Semino, O.; Passarino, G; Oefner, PJ; Lin, AA; et al. (2000), "The Genetic Legacy of Paleolithic Homo sapiens sapiens in Extant Europeans: A Y Chromosome Perspective", Science, 290 (5494): 1155–9, Bibcode:2000Sci...290.1155S, doi:10.1126/science.290.5494.1155, PMID 11073453
- Su, Bing; Xiao, Junhua; Underhill, Peter; Deka, Ranjan; et al. (December 1999). "Y-Chromosome Evidence for a Northward Migration of Modern Humans into Eastern Asia during the Last Ice Age". The American Journal of Human Genetics. 65 (6): 1718–1724. Bibcode:1999AmJHG..65.1718S. doi:10.1086/302680. PMC 1288383. PMID 10577926.
- Underhill, Peter A.; Shen, Peidong; Lin, Alice A.; Jin, Li; et al. (November 2000). "Y chromosome sequence variation and the history of human populations". Nature Genetics. 26 (3): 358–361. doi:10.1038/81685. PMID 11062480. S2CID 12893406.
