= Handedness =

Preference or tendency to use a specific hand

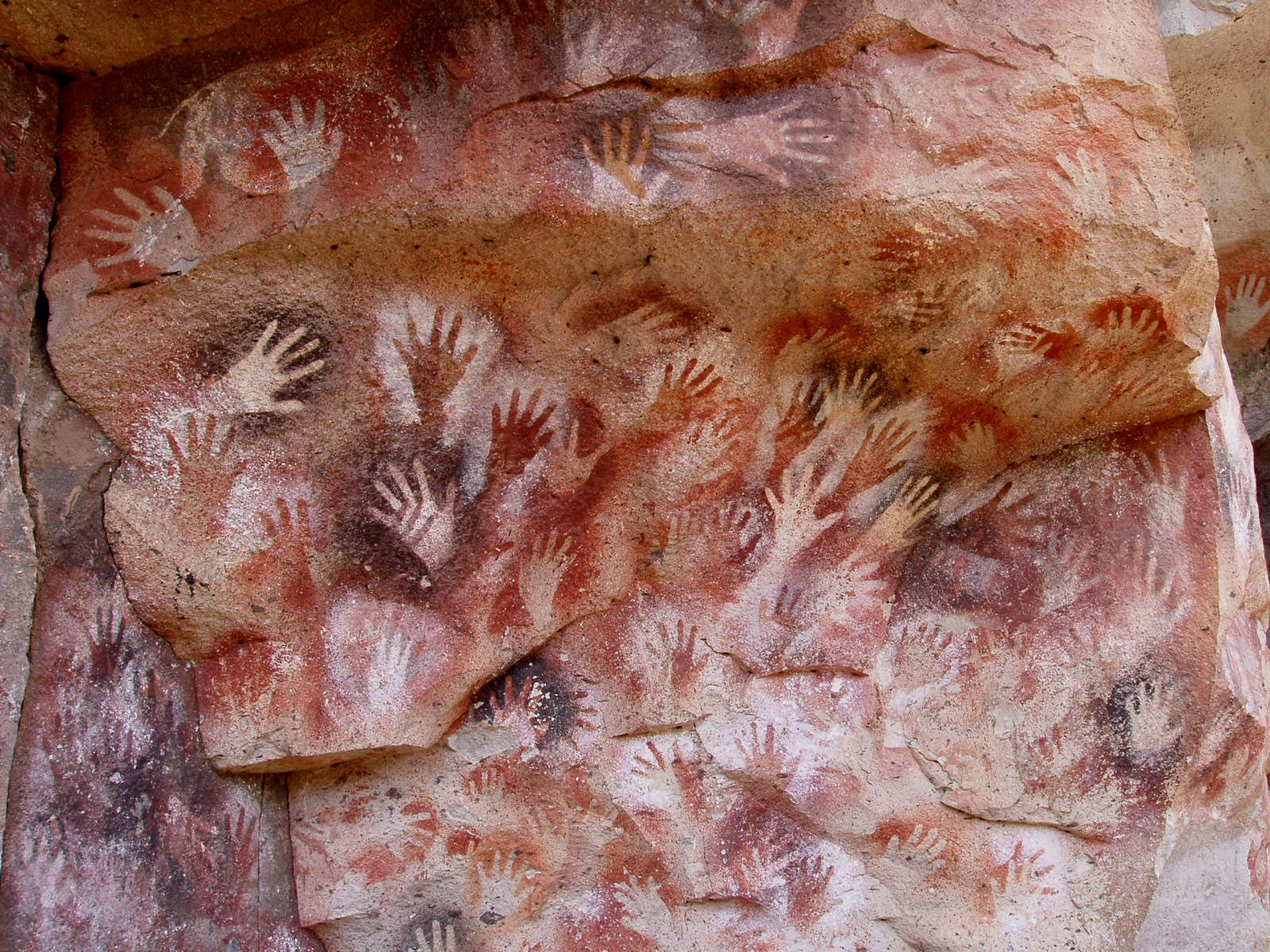
Stenciled hands at the Cueva de las Manos in Argentina. Left hands make up over 90% of the artwork, demonstrating the prevalence of right-handedness.

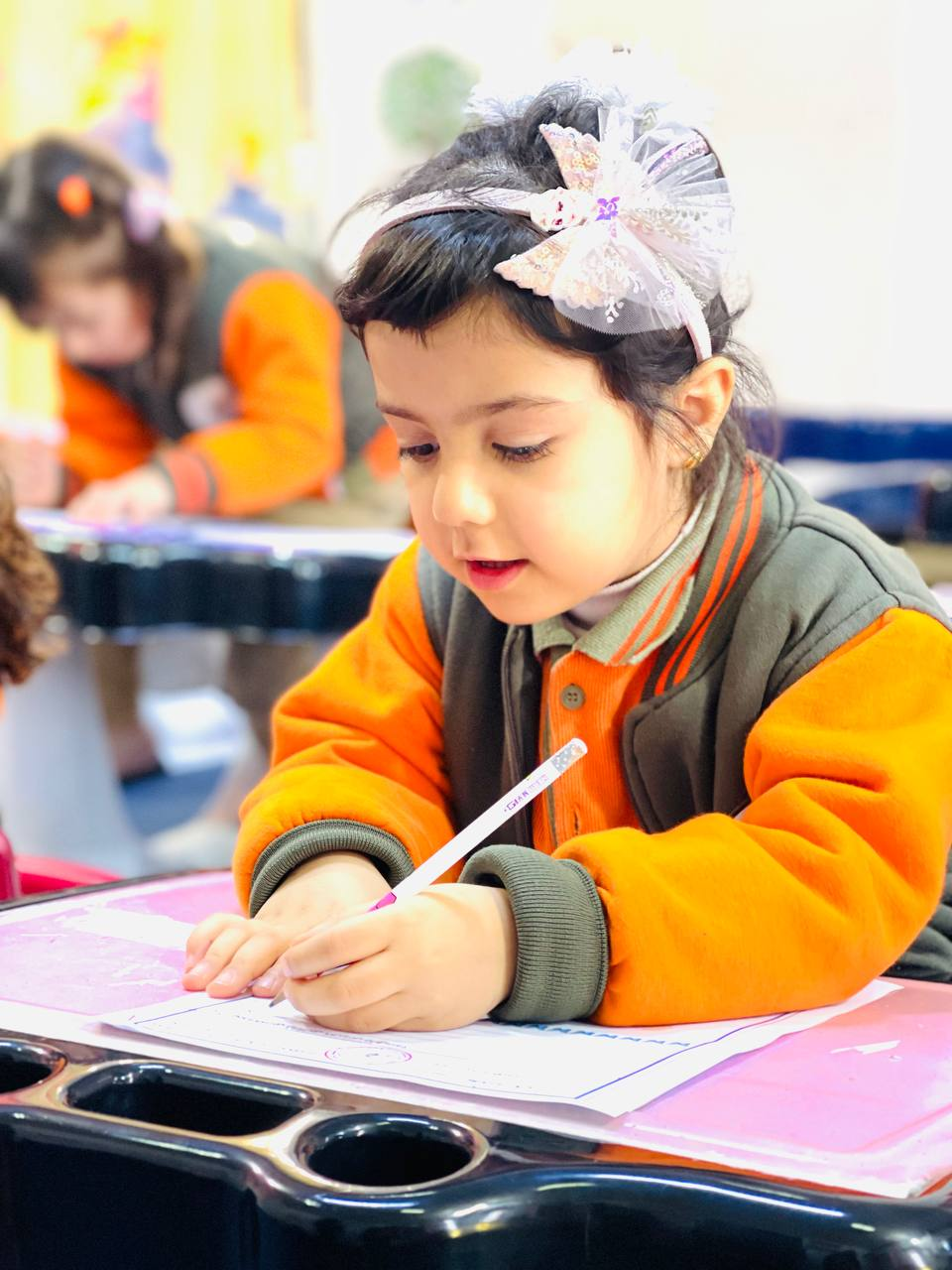
A schoolgirl writing with her left hand

In human biology, handedness is an individual's preferential use of one hand, known as the dominant hand, due to and causing it to be stronger, faster or more dextrous. The other hand, comparatively often the weaker, less dextrous or simply less subjectively preferred, is called the non-dominant hand. In a study from 1975 on 7,688 children in US grades 1–6, left handers comprised 9.6% of the sample, with 10.5% of male children and 8.7% of female children being left-handed. Globally, about 90% of people are right-handed. Handedness is often defined by one's writing hand. It is fairly common for people to prefer to do a particular task with a particular hand. Mixed-handed people change hand preference depending on the task.

Natural ambidexterity does exist, but it is very rare—most people prefer using one hand for most purposes. Those who intentionally train their non-dominant hand still tend to favor their originally dominant hand, although if taught young to use their non-dominant hand it can become functionally dominant in what they trained.

Most research suggests that left-handedness has an epigenetic marker—a combination of genetics, biology and the environment. In some cultures, the use of the left hand can be considered disrespectful. Because the vast majority of the population is right-handed, many devices are designed for use by right-handed people, making their use by left-handed people more difficult. In many countries, left-handed children are required to write with their right hands. However, left-handed people have an advantage in sports that involve aiming at a target in an area of an opponent's control, as their opponents are more accustomed to the right-handed majority. As a result, they are over-represented in baseball, tennis, fencing, cricket, boxing, and mixed martial arts.

== Types ==
- Right-handedness is the most common type. Right-handed people are more skillful with their right hands. Approximately 90% of people are right-handed.
- Left-handedness is less common. Left-handed people are more skillful with their left hands. Studies suggest that approximately 10% of people are left-handed.
- Ambidexterity refers to having equal ability in both hands. Natural ambidexterity is uncommon, with about a 1% prevalence.
- Mixed-handedness or cross-dominance is the change of hand preference between different tasks. This is about as widespread as left-handedness. This is highly associated with the person's childhood brain development.

== Measurement ==
Handedness may be measured behaviourally (performance measures) or through questionnaires (preference measures). The Edinburgh Handedness Inventory has been used since 1971 but contains some dated questions and is hard to score. Revisions have been published by Veale and by Williams. The longer Waterloo Handedness Questionnaire is not widely accessible. More recently, the Flinders Handedness Survey (FLANDERS) has been developed by Mike Nicholls and team from Flinders University and Victoria University of Wellington.

== Evolution ==
Handedness has been found in dozens of non-human vertebrates. While data for fish is contentious, handedness has been found in amphibians, reptiles, birds, and various mammals. Some non-human primates have a preferred hand for tasks, but most do not display a strong right-biased preference like modern humans, with individuals equally split between right-handed and left-handed preferences. A phylogenetic comparative meta-analysis of manual lateralization in 41 anthropoid species found that modern humans are an outlier among primates in both the strength and rightward direction of handedness, and suggested that this pattern may be associated with bipedalism and encephalization. The same study predicted that strong individual hand preference may have appeared early in hominin evolution, whereas a pronounced right-handed population bias increased later, particularly with the emergence of the genus Homo. When exactly a right handed preference developed in the human lineage is still unknown, although it has been found through dental scratch patterns and other means that Neanderthals had a right-handedness bias like modern humans. Attempts to determine handedness of early humans by analysing the morphology of lithic artefacts have been found to be unreliable.

== Causes ==
There are several theories of how handedness develops.

=== Genetic factors ===
Handedness displays a complex inheritance pattern. For example, if both parents of a child are left-handed, there is a 26% chance of their child being left-handed. A large study of twins from 25,732 families by Medland et al. (2006) indicates that the heritability of handedness is roughly 24%.

Two theoretical single-gene models have been proposed to explain the patterns of inheritance of handedness, by Marian Annett of the University of Leicester, and by Chris McManus of UCL.

However, growing evidence from linkage and genome-wide association studies suggests that genetic variance in handedness cannot be explained by a single genetic locus. From these studies, McManus et al. now conclude that handedness is polygenic and estimate that at least 40 loci contribute to the trait.

Brandler et al. performed a genome-wide association study for a measure of relative hand skill and found that genes involved in the determination of left-right asymmetry in the body play a key role in handedness. Brandler and Paracchini suggest the same mechanisms that determine left-right asymmetry in the body (e.g. nodal signaling and ciliogenesis) also play a role in the development of brain asymmetry (handedness being a reflection of brain asymmetry for motor function).

In 2019, Wiberg et al. performed a genome-wide association study and found that handedness was significantly associated with four loci, three of them in genes encoding proteins involved in brain development.

=== Prenatal hormone exposure ===
Four studies have indicated that individuals who have had in-utero exposure to diethylstilbestrol (a synthetic estrogen-based medication used between 1940 and 1971) were more likely to be left-handed over the clinical control group. Diethylstilbestrol animal studies "suggest that estrogen affects the developing brain, including the part that governs sexual behavior and right and left dominance".

=== Ultrasound ===
Another theory is that ultrasound may sometimes affect the brains of unborn children, causing higher rates of left-handedness in children whose mothers receive ultrasound during pregnancy. Research suggests there may be a weak association between ultrasound screening (sonography used to check the healthy development of the fetus and mother) and left-handedness.

=== Epigenetic markers ===
Twin studies indicate that genetic factors explain 25% of the variance in handedness, and environmental factors the remaining 75%. While the molecular basis of handedness epigenetics is largely unclear, Ocklenburg et al. (2017) found that asymmetric methylation of CpG sites plays a key role for gene expression asymmetries related to handedness.

=== Language dominance ===
One common handedness theory is the brain hemisphere division of labor. In most people, the left side of the brain controls speaking. The theory suggests it is more efficient for the brain to divide major tasks between the hemispheres—thus most people may use the non-speaking (right) hemisphere for perception and gross motor skills. As speech is a very complex motor control task, the specialised fine motor areas controlling speech are most efficiently used to also control fine motor movement in the dominant hand. As the right hand is controlled by the left hemisphere (and the left hand is controlled by the right hemisphere) most people are, therefore right-handed. The theory depends on left-handed people having a reversed organisation. However, the majority of left-handers have been found to have left-hemisphere language dominance—just like right-handers. Only around 30% of left-handers are not left-hemisphere dominant for language. Some of those have reversed brain organisation, where the verbal processing takes place in the right-hemisphere and visuospatial processing is dominant to the left hemisphere. Others have more ambiguous bilateral organisation, where both hemispheres do parts of typically lateralised functions. When tasks designed to investigate lateralisation (preference for handedness) are averaged across a group of left-handers, the overall effect is that left-handers show the same pattern of data as right-handers, but with a reduced asymmetry. The majority of the evidence comes from literature assessing oral language production and comprehension. When it comes to writing, findings from recent studies were inconclusive for a difference in lateralization for writing between left-handers and right-handers.

== Developmental timeline ==
Researchers studied fetuses in utero and determined that handedness in the womb was a very accurate predictor of handedness after birth. In a 2013 study, 39% of infants (6 to 14 months) and 97% of toddlers (18 to 24 months) demonstrated a hand preference.

It has been observed that infants fluctuate significantly when choosing which hand to use for grasping and object manipulation tasks, particularly when comparing one-handed and two-handed grasping. Between the ages of 36 and 48 months, there is a significant decline in variability in handedness for one-handed grasping, which can be observed earlier for two-handed manipulation. Children aged 18–36 months showed a stronger hand preference when performing bimanual tasks than when grasping with one hand.

The decrease in handedness variability in children of 36–48 months may be attributable to preschool or kindergarten attendance due to increased single-hand activities such as writing and coloring. Scharoun and Bryden noted that right-handed preference increases with age up to the teenage years.

== Correlation with other factors ==
The modern turn in handedness research has been toward emphasizing degree rather than direction of handedness as a critical variable.

=== Intelligence ===
In his book Right-Hand, Left-Hand, Chris McManus of University College London argues that the proportion of left-handers is increasing, and that an above-average quota of high achievers have been left-handed. He says that left-handers' brains are structured in a way that increases their range of abilities, and that the genes that determine left-handedness also govern development of the brain's language centers.

Writing in Scientific American, he states:

Studies in the U.K., U.S. and Australia have revealed that left-handed people differ from right-handers by only one IQ point, which is not noteworthy ... Left-handers' brains are structured differently from right-handers' in ways that can allow them to process language, spatial relations and emotions in more diverse and potentially creative ways. Also, a slightly larger number of left-handers than right-handers are especially gifted in music and math. A study of musicians in professional orchestras found a significantly greater proportion of talented left-handers, even among those who played instruments that seem designed for right-handers, such as violins. Similarly, studies of adolescents who took tests to assess mathematical giftedness found many more left-handers in the population.

Left-handers are overrepresented among those with lower cognitive skills and mental impairments, with those with intellectual disability being roughly twice as likely to be left-handed, as well as generally lower cognitive and non-cognitive abilities amongst left-handed children. Conversely, left-handers are also overrepresented in high IQ societies, such as Mensa. A 2005 study found that "approximately 20% of the members of Mensa are lefthanded, double the proportion in most general populations".

Ghayas & Adil (2007) found that left-handers were significantly more likely to perform better on intelligence tests than right-handers and that right-handers also took more time to complete the tests. In a systematic review and meta-analysis, Ntolka & Papadatou-Pastou (2018) found that right-handers had higher IQ scores, but that difference was negligible (about 1.5 points).

The prevalence of difficulties in left-right discrimination was investigated in a cohort of 2,720 adult members of Mensa and Intertel by Storfer. According to the study, 7.2% of the men and 18.8% of the women evaluated their left-right directional sense as poor or below average; moreover participants who were relatively ambidextrous experienced problems more frequently than did those who were more strongly left- or right-handed. The study also revealed an effect of age, with younger participants reporting more problems.

==== Early childhood intelligence ====
Nelson, Campbell and Michel investigated whether the development of handedness in infants was correlated with language abilities in toddlers. In their article, they assessed 38 infants, following them from birth to 12 months, and then again from 18 to 24 months. They found that children who developed a consistent preference for using either their right or left hand during infancy (e.g. putting the pacifier back in with the right hand or grasping random objects with the left hand) were more likely to have superior language skills as toddlers. Children who did not become lateral until after infancy (i.e., when they were toddlers) showed normal language development and had typical language scores. The researchers used Bayley scales of infant and toddler development to assess the subjects.

=== Music ===
In two studies, Diana Deutsch found that left-handers, particularly those with mixed-hand preference, performed significantly better than right-handers in musical memory tasks. There are also handedness differences in perception of musical patterns. Left-handers as a group differ from right-handers, and are more heterogeneous than right-handers, in perception of certain stereo illusions, such as the octave illusion, the scale illusion, and the glissando illusion.

=== Health ===
Studies have found a positive correlation between left-handedness and several specific physical and mental disorders and health problems, including:

- Lower birth weight and complications at birth are positively correlated with left-handedness.
- A variety of neuropsychiatric and developmental disorders such as autism spectrum, bipolar disorder, anxiety disorders, schizophrenia, and alcoholism have been associated with left- and mixed-handedness.
- A 2012 study showed that nearly 40% of children with cerebral palsy were left-handed, while another study demonstrated that left-handedness was associated with a 62% increased risk of Parkinson's disease in women, but not in men. Another study suggests that the risk of developing multiple sclerosis increases for left-handed women, but the effect is unknown for men at this point.
- Left-handed women may have a higher risk of breast cancer than right-handed women and the effect is greater in post-menopausal women.
- At least one study maintains that left-handers are more likely to suffer from heart disease, and are more likely to have reduced longevity from cardiovascular causes.
- Left-handers may be more likely to suffer bone fractures.
- Left-handers have a lower prevalence of arthritis and ulcer.
- One systematic review concluded, "Left-handers showed no systematic tendency to suffer from disorders of the immune system."

As handedness is a highly heritable trait associated with various medical conditions that could present a challenge to Darwinian fitness challenge in ancestral populations, it is possible that left-handedness was rarer in the distant past due to natural selection. However, left-handers have on average been found to have an advantage in combat and competitive sports, which could have increased their reproductive success in ancestral populations.

=== Income ===
In 2006, researchers from Lafayette College and Johns Hopkins University concluded that there was no statistically significant correlation between handedness and earnings for the general population. However, among people who had attended college, left-handers earned 10 - 15% more than their right-handed counterparts.

In a 2014 study published by the National Bureau of Economic Research, Harvard economist Joshua Goodman finds that left-handed people earn 10 to 12 percent less over the course of their lives than right-handed people. Goodman attributes this disparity to higher rates of emotional and behavioral problems in left-handed people.

=== Sports ===
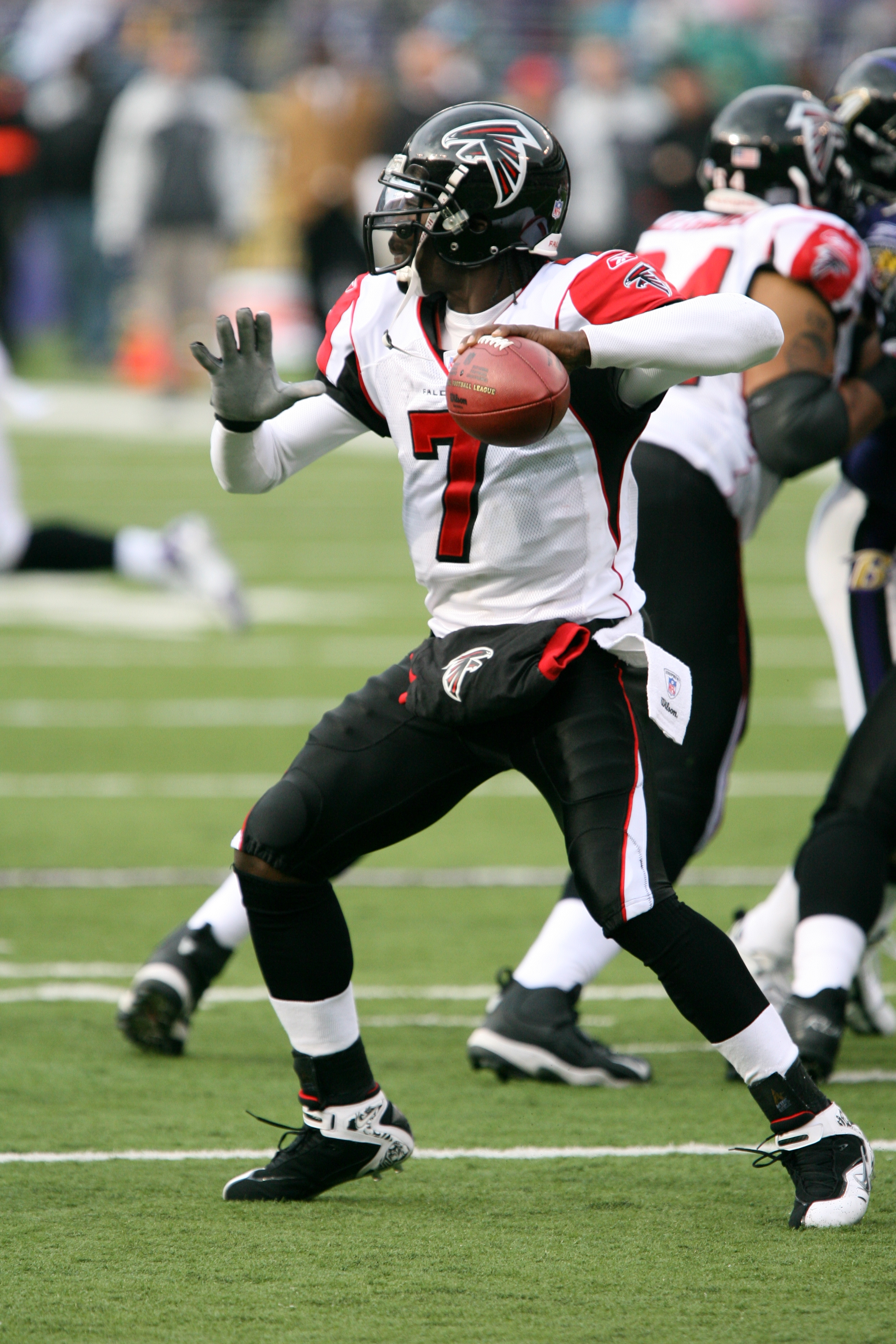
Michael Vick, a left-handed American football quarterback, winds up to throw the ball to his teammate.

Interactive sports such as table tennis, badminton and cricket have an overrepresentation of left-handedness, while non-interactive sports such as swimming show no overrepresentation. Smaller physical distance between participants increases the overrepresentation. In fencing, about half the participants are left-handed. In tennis, 40% of the seeded players are left-handed. The term southpaw is sometimes used to refer to a left-handed individual, especially in baseball and boxing. Some studies suggest that right handed male athletes tend to be statistically taller and heavier than left handed ones.

Other, sports-specific factors may increase or decrease the advantage left-handers usually hold in one-on-one situations:

- In baseball, a right-handed pitcher's curve ball will break away from a right-handed batter and towards a left-handed batter (batting left or right does not indicate left or right handedness). While studies of handedness show that only 10% of the general population is left-handed, the proportion of left-handed MLB players is closer to 39% of hitters and 28% of pitchers, according to 2012 data. Historical batting averages show that left-handed batters have a slight advantage over right-handed batters when facing right-handed pitchers. Because there are fewer left-handed pitchers than right-handed pitchers, left-handed batters have more opportunities to face right-handed pitchers than their right-handed counterparts have against left-handed pitchers. Fifteen of the top twenty career batting average leaders in Major League Baseball history have been posted by left-handed batters.
  - Because a left-handed pitcher faces first base when he is in position to throw to the batter, whereas a right-handed pitcher has his back to first base, a left-handed pitcher has an advantage when attempting to pick off baserunners at first base.
  - Defensively in baseball, left-handedness is considered an advantage for first basemen because they are better suited to fielding balls hit in the gap between first and second base, and because they do not have to pivot their body around before throwing the ball to another infielder. For the same reason, the other infielders' positions are seen as being advantageous to right-handed throwers. Historically, there have been few left-handed catchers because of the perceived disadvantage a left-handed catcher would have in making the throw to third base, especially with a right-handed hitter at the plate. A left-handed catcher would have a potentially more dangerous time tagging out a baserunner trying to score. With the ball in the glove on the right hand, a left-handed catcher would have to turn his body to the left to tag a runner. In doing so, he can lose the opportunity to brace himself for an impending collision. On the other hand, the Encyclopedia of Baseball Catchers states:

One advantage is a left-handed catcher's ability to frame a right-handed pitcher's breaking balls. A right-handed catcher catches a right-hander's breaking ball across his body, with his glove moving out of the strike zone. A left-handed catcher would be able to catch the pitch moving into the strike zone and create a better target for the umpire.

- In four wall handball, typical strategy is to play along the left wall forcing the opponent to use their left hand to counter the attack and playing into the strength of a left-handed competitor.
- In handball, left-handed players have an advantage on the right side of the field when attacking, getting a better angle, and that defenders might be unused to them. Since few people are left-handed, there is a demand for such players.
- In water polo, the centre forward position has an advantage in turning to shoot on net when rotating the reverse direction as expected by the centre of the opposition defence and gain an improved position to score. Left-handed drivers are usually on the right side of the field, because they can get better angles to pass the ball or shoot for goal.
- Ice hockey typically uses a strategy in which a defence pairing includes one left-handed and one right-handed defender. A disproportionately large number of ice hockey players of all positions, 62 percent, shoot left, although this does not necessarily indicate left-handedness.
- In American football, the handedness of a quarterback affects blocking patterns on the offensive line. Tight ends, when only one is used, typically line up on the same side as the throwing hand of the quarterback, while the offensive tackle on the opposite hand, which protects the quarterback's "blind side", is typically the most valued member of the offensive line. Receivers also have to adapt to the opposite spin. While uncommon, there have been several notable left-handed quarterbacks.
- In bowling, the oil pattern used on the bowling lane breaks down faster the more times a ball is rolled down the lane. Bowlers must continually adjust their shots to compensate for the ball's change in rotation as the game or series is played and the oil is altered from its original pattern. A left-handed bowler competes on the opposite side of the lane from the right-handed bowler and therefore deals with less breakdown of the original oil placement. This means left-handed bowlers have to adjust their shot less frequently than right-handed bowlers in team events or qualifying rounds where there are possibly 4-10 people per set of two lanes. This can allow them to stay more consistent. However, this advantage is not present in bracket rounds and tournament finals where matches are 1v1 on a pair of lanes.

=== Sex ===
According to a meta-analysis of 144 studies totalling 1,787,629 participants, the best estimate of the male to female odds ratio was 1.23, indicating that men are 23% more likely to be left-handed. For instance, if the prevalence of female left-handedness was 10%, the prevalence of male left-handedness would be approximately 12% (10% prevalence of left-handedness among women multiplied by an odds ratio of 1:1.23 for women: men results in a 12.3% prevalence of left-handedness among men).

=== Sexuality and gender identity ===
Some studies examining the relationship between handedness and sexual orientation have reported that a disproportionately large fraction of homosexual people exhibit non-right-handedness, though findings are mixed.

A 2001 study found that individuals assigned male at birth, whose gender identity did not align with their assigned sex, were more than twice as likely to be left-handed as a clinical control group (19.5% vs. 8.3%, respectively).

Paraphilias (atypical sexual interests) have also been linked to higher rates of left-handedness. A 2008 study analyzing the sexual fantasies of 200 males found "elevated paraphilic interests were correlated with elevated non-right handedness". Greater rates of left-handedness have also been documented among pedophiles.

A 2014 study attempting to analyze the biological markers of asexuality asserts that non-sexual men and women were 2.4 and 2.5 times, respectively, more likely to be left-handed than their heterosexual counterparts.

=== Mortality rates in combat ===
A study at Durham University—which examined mortality data for cricketers whose handedness was a matter of public record—found that left-handed men were almost twice as likely to die in war as their right-handed contemporaries. The study theorised that this was because weapons and other equipment was designed for the right-handed. "I can sympathise with all those left-handed cricketers who have gone to an early grave trying desperately to shoot straight with a right-handed Lee Enfield .303", wrote a journalist reviewing the study in the cricket press. The findings echo those of previous American studies, which found that left-handed US sailors were 34% more likely to have a serious accident than their right-handed counterparts.

=== Episodic memory ===
A high level of handedness (whether strongly favoring right or left) is associated with poorer episodic memory, and with poorer communication between brain hemispheres, which may give poorer emotional processing, although bilateral stimulation may reduce such effects.

=== Corpus callosum ===
A high level of handedness is associated with a smaller corpus callosum whereas low handedness with a larger one.

== Products for left-handed use ==
Many tools and procedures are designed for use by right-handed people, with the difficulties faced by left-handed people often being overlooked. John W. Santrock has written, "For centuries, left-handers have suffered unfair discrimination in a world designed for right-handers."

Although many products for left-handed use are made by specialist producers, they are not available from normal suppliers. Even simple items such as knives designed for right-handed use are less convenient for left-handers. There are many examples: kitchen tools such as knives, corkscrews and scissors, garden tools, and so on. While not requiring a purpose-designed product, there are more appropriate ways for left-handers to tie shoelaces. There are companies that supply products designed specifically for left-handed use. One such is Anything Left-Handed, which in 1967 opened a shop in Soho, London; the shop closed in 2006, but the company continues to supply left-handed products worldwide by mail order.

Stringed instruments such as the guitar and electric bass have been adapted for left-handed musicians. However, some guitarists such as Jimi Hendrix simply reversed the strings and played their instrument "upside down," though others such as Paul McCartney use left-hand guitar and bass models.

Writing from left to right, as in most languages, with the left hand tends to smear the ink what has just been written, depending on how long it takes for the ink to dry. Left-handed writers have developed various ways of tilting the paper, or holding a pen to achieve the best results. For using a fountain pen, preferred by many left-handers, nibs ground to optimise left-handed use (pushing rather than pulling across the paper) without scratching are available.

== Bias against left-handers ==
McManus observed that, as the Industrial Revolution spread across Western Europe and the United States in the 19th century, workers needed to operate complex machines that were designed with right-handers in mind. This would have made left-handers more visible, while also making them appear less capable and more clumsy. For example, writing with a dip pen was particularly prone to blots and smearing.

=== Negative connotations and discrimination ===
Apart from the inconveniences they face, left-handed people have historically been considered unlucky or even malicious because of their difference by the right-handed majority. In many languages, including English, the word for the direction "right" also means "correct" or "proper". Throughout history, being left-handed was considered negative, or evil.

Black magic is sometimes referred to as the "left-hand path".

==== Discrimination in education ====
Before the development of fountain pens and other modern writing instruments, children were taught to write with a dip pen. While a right-hander could smoothly drag the pen across the paper from left to right, it was difficult for a left-hander to push the dip pen across the paper without digging into it and creating blots and stains. Even with more modern pens, writing from left to right with the left hand can smear what has just been written when moving across the line, as is the case in many languages.

Into the 20th and even the 21st century, left-handed children in Uganda were beaten by schoolteachers or parents for writing with their left hand, or had their left hands tied behind their backs to force them to write with their right hand. As a child, the future British king George VI (1895–1952) was naturally left-handed. He was forced to write with his right hand, as was common practice at the time. He was not expected to become king, so that was not a factor.

Depending on the position and inclination of the writing paper, and the writing method, left-handed writers can write as neatly and efficiently, or as messily and slowly, as right-handed writers. Left-handed children usually need to be taught how to write correctly with their left hand, as discovering a comfortable left-handed writing method independently can be difficult.

In the Soviet school system, all left-handed children were forced to write with their right hand.

=== International Left-Handers Day ===
International Left-Handers Day is held annually every August 13. It was founded by the Left-Handers Club in 1992, with the club itself having been founded in 1990. International Left-Handers Day is, according to the club, "an annual event when left-handers everywhere can celebrate their sinistrality (left-handedness) and increase public awareness of the advantages and disadvantages of being left-handed". It celebrates their uniqueness and differences, who are from seven to ten percent of the world's population. Thousands of left-handed people in today's society have to adapt to use right-handed tools and objects. Again according to the club, "in the U.K. alone there were over 20 regional events to mark the day in 2001—including left-v-right sports matches, a left-handed tea party, pubs using left-handed corkscrews where patrons drank and played pub games with the left hand only, and nationwide 'Lefty Zones' where left-handers' creativity, adaptability and sporting prowess were celebrated, whilst right-handers were encouraged to try out everyday left-handed objects to see just how awkward it can feel using the wrong equipment."

== In other animals ==
Kangaroos and other macropod marsupials show a left-hand preference for everyday tasks in the wild. 'True' handedness is unexpected in marsupials however, because unlike placental mammals, they lack a corpus callosum. Left-handedness was particularly apparent in the red kangaroo (Macropus rufus) and the eastern gray kangaroo (Macropus giganteus). Red-necked (Bennett's) wallabies (Macropus rufogriseus) preferentially use their left hand for behaviours that involve fine manipulation, but the right for behaviours that require more physical strength. There was less evidence for handedness in arboreal species. Studies of dogs, horses, and domestic cats have shown that females of those species tend to be right-handed, while males tend to be left-handed.

== See also ==
=== Directionality ===
- Cardinal direction
- Clockwise, which also discusses counterclockwise/anticlockwise, the two terms for the opposite sense of rotation
- Dexter and sinister
- Left- and right-hand traffic
- Left-right confusion
- Proper right and proper left
- Situs inversus

=== Laterality ===
- Ambidexterity
- Cross-dominance
- Edinburgh Handedness Inventory
- Geschwind–Galaburda hypothesis
- Footedness
- Laterality
- Lateralization of brain function
- Neuroanatomy of handedness
- Ocular dominance (eyedness)
- Twins and handedness

== Further resources ==
- The Lateralized Brain. 2024. doi:10.1016/C2021-0-02209-4. ISBN 978-0-323-99737-9.
