= Laterality =

Preference most humans show for one side of their body over the other

Left hemisphere of a human brain

The term laterality refers to asymmetric preference, usage, skill, or specialization of symmetric body parts in an organism. Humans exhibit laterality in many ways, including limb dominance such as left and right handedness and footedness as well as specialization of one brain hemisphere over the other for certain functions such as language. Many other animals have also been shown to exhibit laterality in their own ways.

== Laterality in humans ==
The majority of humans are right handed and prefer to use the right side of their body in general (right foot, eye, and ear, for example), although this is not the case for everyone. Some prefer to use their left side, have no preference, or have mixed preferences.

Ambidexterity is when a person has approximately equal skill with both hands and/or both sides of the body. True ambidexterity is very rare. Although a small number of people can write competently with both hands and use both sides of their body well, even these people usually show preference for one side of their body over the other.

Which side a person prefers to use is not necessarily consistent across all parts of the body. For example, it is not uncommon for a typically right handed person to prefer to use their left leg, e.g. when using a shovel, kicking a ball, or operating control pedals.

Approximate statistics, complied in 1981, are given below:

- Favoring right hand: 88.2%
- Favoring right foot: 81.0%
- Favoring right eye: 71.1%
- Favoring right ear: 59.1%
- Same hand and foot: 84%
- Same ear and eye: 61.8%

Lateral preference also is not always consistent across different activities performed by the same part of the body. Some people may, for instance, use their right hand for writing, and their left hand for playing racket sports and eating. In the sport of cricket, some players may find that they are more comfortable bowling with their left or right hand, but batting with the other hand. This inconsistent preference is referred to as cross dominance.

=== Different expressions ===
Board footedness
The stance in a boardsport is not necessarily the same as the normal-footedness of the person. In skateboarding and other board sports, a "goofy footed" stance is one with the right foot leading. A stance with the left foot forward is called "regular" or "normal" stance.
Jump and spin
Direction of rotation in figure skating jumps and spins is not necessarily the same as the footedness or the handedness of each person. A skater can jump and spin counter-clockwise (the most common direction), yet be left-footed and left-handed.
Ocular dominance
The eye preferred when binocular vision is not possible, as through a keyhole or monocular microscope.

=== Laterality in Human Society ===
Since human cultures are predominantly right-handed, the right-sided trend may be socially as well as biologically enforced. This is quite apparent from a quick survey of languages. The English word left comes from the Anglo-Saxon word lyft, which means 'weak' or 'useless'. Similarly, the French word for left, gauche, is also used to mean 'awkward' or 'tactless', and sinistra, the Latin word from which the English word sinister was derived, means 'left'. Similarly, in many cultures the word for right also means 'correct'. The English word right comes from the Anglo-Saxon word riht, which also means 'straight' or 'correct'.

This linguistic and social bias is not restricted to European cultures: for example, Chinese characters are designed for right-handers to write, and no significant left-handed culture has ever been found in the world.

The social bias against left handedness can lead to people who would naturally prefer their left hand being forced or pressured into using their right hand instead. When a person is forced to use the hand opposite of the hand that they would naturally use, this is known as forced laterality, or more specifically forced dextrality. A study done by the Department of Neurology at Keele University, North Staffordshire Royal Infirmary suggests that forced dextrality may be part of the reason that the percentage of left-handed people decreases with the higher age groups, both because the effects of pressures toward right-handedness are cumulative over time (hence increasing with age for any given person subjected to them) and because the prevalence of such pressure is decreasing, such that fewer members of younger generations face any such pressure to begin with.

It also has been suggested that in many cases, cross dominance may occur because a person is disposed for left-handedness but has been trained for right-handedness, which is usually attached to learning and behavioral disorders.

=== Speech and Laterality in the Brain ===
Cerebral dominance or specialization has been studied in relation to a variety of human functions. With speech in particular, many studies have been used as evidence that it is generally localized in the left hemisphere. Research comparing the effects of lesions in the two hemispheres, split-brain patients, and perceptual asymmetries have aided in the knowledge of speech lateralization. In one particular study, the left hemisphere's sensitivity to differences in rapidly changing sound cues was noted. This has real world implication, since very fine acoustic discriminations are needed to comprehend and produce speech signals. In an electrical stimulation demonstration performed by Ojemann and Mateer the exposed cortex was mapped revealing the same cortical sites were activated in phoneme discrimination and mouth movement sequences.

Left hemisphere speech lateralization might be based upon a preference for movement sequences as demonstrated by American Sign Language (ASL) studies. Since ASL requires intricate hand movements for language communication, it was proposed that skilled hand motions and speech require sequences of action over time. In deaf patients with a left hemispheric stroke and damage, noticeable losses in their abilities to sign were noted. These cases were compared to studies of normal speakers with dysphasias located at lesioned areas similar to the deaf patients. In the same study, deaf patients with right hemispheric lesions did not display any significant loss of signing nor any decreased capacity for motor sequencing.

One theory, known as the acoustic laterality theory, the physical properties of certain speech sounds are what determine laterality to the left hemisphere. Stop consonants, for example t, p, or k, leave a defined silent period at the end of words that can easily be distinguished. This theory postulates that changing sounds such as these are preferentially processed by the left hemisphere. As a result of the right ear being responsible for transmission to sounds to the left hemisphere, it is capable of perceiving these sounds with rapid changes. This right ear advantage in hearing and speech laterality was evidenced in dichotic listening studies. Magnetic imaging results from this study showed greater left hemisphere activation when actual words were presented as opposed to pseudowords. Two important aspects of speech recognition are phonetic cues, such as format patterning, and prosody cues, such as intonation, accent, and emotional state of the speaker.

In a study done with both monolinguals and bilinguals, which took into account language experience, second language proficiency, and onset of bilingualism among other variables, researchers were able to demonstrate left hemispheric dominance. In addition, bilinguals that began speaking a second language early in life demonstrated bilateral hemispheric involvement. The findings of this study were able to predict differing patterns of cerebral language lateralization in adulthood.

== In other animals ==
It has been shown that cerebral lateralization is a widespread phenomenon in the animal kingdom. Functional and structural differences between left and right brain hemispheres can be found in many other vertebrates and also in invertebrates.

It has been proposed that negative, withdrawal-associated emotions are processed predominantly by the right hemisphere, whereas the left hemisphere is largely responsible for processing positive, approach-related emotions. This has been called the "laterality-valence hypothesis".

One sub-set of laterality in animals is limb dominance. Preferential limb use for specific tasks has been shown in species including chimpanzees, mice, bats, wallabies, parrots, chickens and toads.

Another form of laterality is hemispheric dominance for processing conspecific vocalizations, reported for chimpanzees, sea lions, dogs, zebra finches and Bengalese finches.

=== In mice ===
In mice (Mus musculus), laterality in paw usage has been shown to be a learned behavior (rather than inherited), due to which, in any population, half of the mice become left-handed while the other half becomes right-handed. The learning occurs by a gradual reinforcement of randomly occurring weak asymmetries in paw choice early in training, even when training in an unbiased world. Meanwhile, reinforcement relies on short-term and long-term memory skills that are strain-dependent, causing strains to differ in the degree of laterality of its individuals. Long-term memory of previously gained laterality in handedness due to training is heavily diminished in mice with absent corpus callosum and reduced hippocampal commissure. Regardless of the amount of past training and consequent biasing of paw choice, there is a degree of randomness in paw choice that is not removed by training, which may provide adaptability to changing environments.

=== In other mammals ===
Domestic horses (Equus caballus) exhibit laterality in at least two areas of neural organization, i.e. sensory and motor. In thoroughbreds, the strength of motor laterality increases with age. Horses under 4 years old have a preference to initially use the right nostril during olfaction. Along with olfaction, French horses have an eye laterality when looking at novel objects. There is a correlation between their score on an emotional index and eye preference; horses with higher emotionality are more likely to look with their left eye. The less emotive French saddlebreds glance at novel objects using the right eye, however, this tendency is absent in the trotters, although the emotive index is the same for both breeds. Racehorses exhibit laterality in stride patterns as well. They use their preferred stride pattern at all times whether racing or not, unless they are forced to change it while turning, injured, or fatigued.

Fearfulness is an undesirable trait in guide dogs, therefore, testing for laterality can be a useful predictor of a successful guide dog. Knowing a guide dog's laterality can also be useful for training because the dog may be better at walking to the left or the right of their blind owner.

Domestic cats (Felis catus) show an individual handedness when reaching for static food. In one study, 46% preferred to use the right paw, 44% the left, and 10% were ambi-lateral; 60% used one paw 100% of the time. There was no difference between male and female cats in the proportions of left and right paw preferences. In moving-target reaching tests, cats have a left-sided behavioural asymmetry. One study indicates that laterality in this species is strongly related to temperament. Furthermore, individuals with stronger paw preferences are rated as more confident, affectionate, active, and friendly.

Chimpanzees show right-handedness in certain conditions. This is expressed at the population level for females, but not males. The complexity of the task has a dominant effect on handedness in chimps.

Cattle use visual/brain lateralisation in their visual scanning of novel and familiar stimuli. Domestic cattle prefer to view novel stimuli with the left eye, (similar to horses, Australian magpies, chicks, toads and fish) but use the right eye for viewing familiar stimuli.

Schreibers' long-fingered bat is lateralized at the population level and shows a left-hand bias for climbing or grasping.

==== In marsupials ====
Marsupials are fundamentally different from other mammals in that they lack a corpus callosum. However, wild kangaroos and other macropod marsupials have a left-hand preference for everyday tasks. Left-handedness is particularly apparent in the red kangaroo (Macropus rufus) and the eastern gray kangaroo (Macropus giganteus). The red-necked wallaby (Macropus rufogriseus) preferentially uses the left hand for behaviours that involve fine manipulation, but the right for behaviours that require more physical strength. There is less evidence for handedness in arboreal species.

=== In birds ===
Parrots tend to favor one foot when grasping objects (for example fruit when feeding). Some studies indicate that most parrots are left footed.

The Australian magpie (Gymnorhina tibicen) uses both left-eye and right-eye laterality when performing anti-predator responses, which include mobbing. Prior to withdrawing from a potential predator, Australian magpies view the animal with the left eye (85%), but prior to approaching, the right eye is used (72%). The left eye is used prior to jumping (73%) and prior to circling (65%) the predator, as well as during circling (58%) and for high alert inspection of the predator (72%). The researchers commented that "mobbing and perhaps circling are agonistic responses controlled by the LE[left eye]/right hemisphere, as also seen in other species. Alert inspection involves detailed examination of the predator and likely high levels of fear, known to be right hemisphere function."

Yellow-legged gull (Larus michahellis) chicks show laterality when reverting from a supine to prone posture, and also in pecking at a dummy parental bill to beg for food. Lateralization occurs at both the population and individual level in the reverting response and at the individual level in begging. Females have a leftward preference in the righting response, indicating this is sex dependent. Laterality in the begging response in chicks varies according to laying order and matches variation in egg androgens concentration.

=== In fish ===
Laterality determines the organisation of rainbowfish (Melanotaenia spp.) schools. These fish demonstrate an individual eye preference when examining their reflection in a mirror. Fish which show a right-eye preference in the mirror test prefer to be on the left side of the school. Conversely, fish that show a left-eye preference in the mirror test or were non-lateralised, prefer to be slightly to the right side of the school. The behaviour depends on the species and sex of the school.

=== In amphibians ===
Three species of toads, the common toad (Bufo bufo), green toad (Bufo viridis) and the cane toad (Bufo marinus) show stronger escape and defensive responses when a model predator was placed on the toad's left side compared to their right side. Emei music frogs (Babina daunchina) have a right-ear preference for positive or neutral signals such as a conspecific's advertisement call and white noise, but a left-ear preference for negative signals such as predatory attack.

=== In invertebrates ===
The Mediterranean fruit fly (Ceratitis capitata) exhibits left-biased population-level lateralisation of aggressive displays (boxing with forelegs and wing strikes) with no sex-differences. In ants, Temnothorax albipennis (rock ant) scouts show behavioural lateralization when exploring unknown nest sites, showing a population-level bias to prefer left turns. One possible reason for this is that its environment is partly maze-like and consistently turning in one direction is a good way to search and exit mazes without getting lost. This turning bias is correlated with slight asymmetries in the ants' compound eyes (differential ommatidia count).

== See also ==
- Dextrocardia
- Situs inversus
- Handedness
- Footedness
- Ocular dominance
- Lateralization of brain function
- Cross-dominance
- Semantic processing
