= Silvia Paracchini =

Geneticist and researcher

Silvia Paracchini FRSE is a Professor of Neurogenetics and Genomics at the University of St Andrews. Her research focuses on the genetics of neurodevelopmental traits such as dyslexia and human handedness. Paracchini featured in the Royal Society of Edinburgh's 2019 Women in Science in Scotland exhibition, which celebrated some of Scotland’s leading female scientists. She is a Fellow of the Royal Society of Biology and of the Royal Society of Edinburgh.

== Education ==
As an undergraduate, Paracchini studied Biological Sciences at the University of Pavia, Italy. During this time she undertook an ERASMUS scholarship project at the Technical University of Denmark. She obtained her DPhil in Human Genetics from the University of Oxford in 2003.

== Career and research ==
After obtaining her doctorate, Paracchini held a post-doctoral research position with the Wellcome Trust Centre for Human Genetics from 2003 to 2011. In 2011, she was awarded a Royal Society University Research Fellowship. Her research group at the University of St Andrews School of Medicine explores the genetic underpinnings of human behavioural traits like handedness, and neurodevelopment disorders like dyslexia by combining large genetic screenings for quantitative measures followed by gene function characterization. She also contributed to the largest study of human handedness in the world giving the best estimate of 10.6% for left-handedness.

=== Honours and prizes ===
- 2005 European Society of Human Genetics, Young Investigator Award for Outstanding Science
- 2011 Royal Society University Research Fellowship
- 2014 Member of the Young Academy of Scotland
- 2018 Fellow of the Royal Society of Biology
- 2019 Fellow of the Royal Society of Edinburgh

In 2019, Paracchini featured in the Royal Society of Edinburgh's Women in Science in Scotland exhibition, which celebrated some of Scotland’s leading female scientists.
