= Ambidexterity =

Ability to do any task equally well with either hand

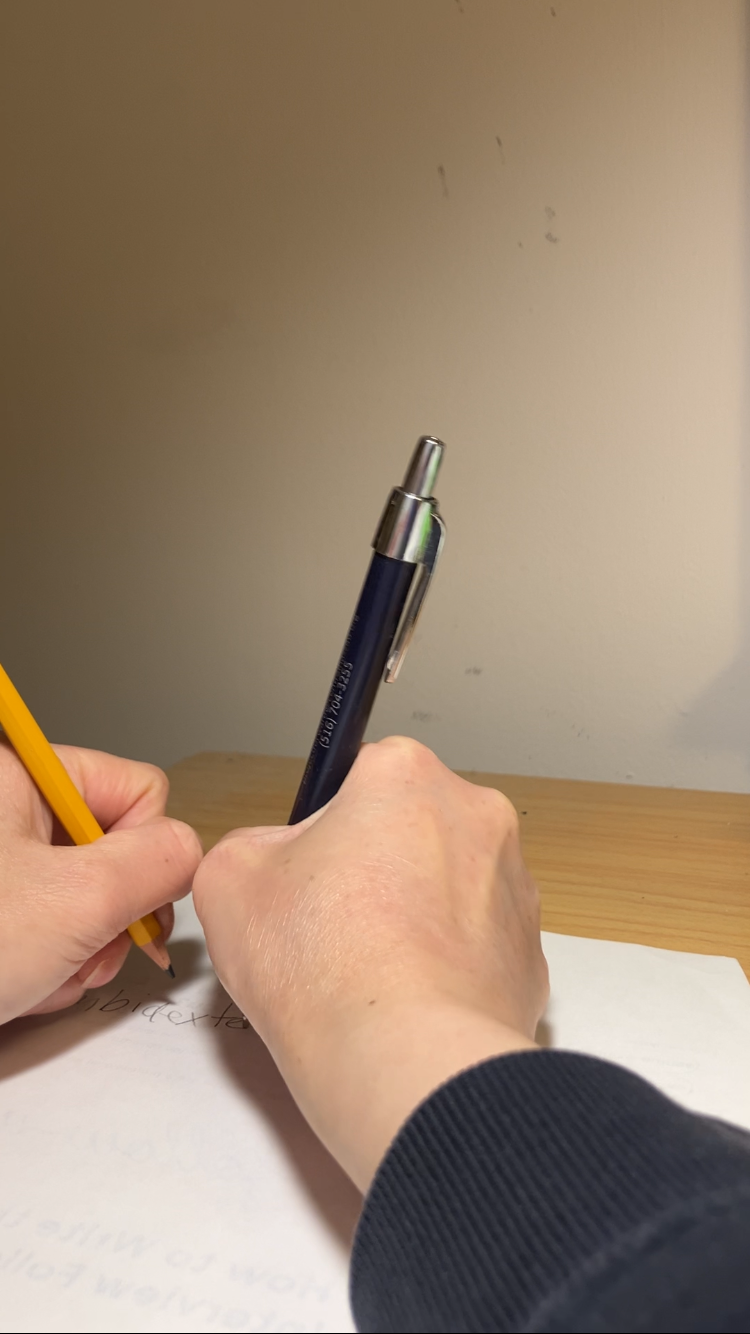
A person is writing with both hands.

Ambidexterity is the ability to use both the right and left hand equally well. When referring to an object, the word ambidextrous means that the object is equally suitable for right-handed and left-handed people. When referring to a person, it means that the person has no marked preference for the use of the right or left hand.

Only about one percent of people are naturally ambidextrous, which equates to about 80,000,000 people in the world. Because many common devices, such as can openers and scissors, are asymmetrical and designed for right-handed people, many left-handers learn to use them right-handedly due to the rarity or lack of left-handed models. Thus, left-handed people are more likely to develop motor skills in their non-dominant hand than are right-handed people.

== Etymology ==
The word "ambidextrous" is derived from the Latin roots ambi-, meaning "both", and dexter, meaning "right" or "favorable". Thus, ambidextrous is literally "both right" or "both favorable".

The Latin word is first attested in the Vetus Latina, calquing Ancient Greek "amphoterodéxios" in Judges 3:15 after the Septuagint, itself translating Hebrew iṭṭēr yaḏ yəmīnō, literally "bound in his right hand". This phrase is now generally translated as “left-handed”; the Septuagint translation is either from a variant reading or from a different interpretation.

== History ==
The word "ambidexterity" was first coined by scholar Thomas Browne in 1646. It was not until the 1880s when ambidexterity stopped being as stigmatized as left-handedness, by which time there was an emergence of movements that advocated for the advantages of learning ambidexterity. A notable proponent of this movement was John Jackson, who founded the Ambidextral Culture Society. Jackson and his followers believed that the brain's hemispheres were independent and distinct from each other, and that mere right-handedness was effectively wasting half of people's potential to learn, and aimed for its widespread adoption. Robert Baden-Powell, the founder of The Scout Association, supported this movement. Much of Jackson's, and other advocates' claims have since been largely dismissed, with research finding disadvantages that can come with being ambidextrous, however others argue that ambidexterity can still have advantages, which often pertain to the concept of neuroplasticity.

== Tools ==
With respect to tools, ambidextrous may be used to mean that the tool may be used equally well with either hand; an "ambidextrous knife" refers to the opening mechanism and locking mechanism on a folding knife. It can also mean that the tool can be interchanged between left and right in some other way, such as an "ambidextrous headset," which can be worn on either the left or right ear. Many tools and implements are made specifically for use in the right hand, and will not work properly if used in the other hand. There exist shops dedicated to selling implements and tools made specifically for left-handed use. For example, left-handed, and ambidextrous, scissors are available.

Many knives are sold sharpened asymmetrically for right-hand use, and resharpened in the same way. It is possible to buy knives sharpened for left-handed use, and to sharpen any knife in that way.

== Writing ==
Some people can write with both hands. Famous examples include Benjamin Franklin, Nikola Tesla, James A. Garfield, and Leonardo da Vinci.

== Medicine and surgery ==
A degree of ambidexterity is required in surgery. Surgeons must be able to tie with their left and right hands in either single or double knots. This is usually due to factors like the positioning of the surgeon, whether they have an assistant and the angle required to throw and secure the knot.

Ambidexterity is also useful after surgery on a dominant hand or arm, as it allows the patient to use their non-dominant hand with equal facility as the limb which is recovering from surgery.

In India's Singrauli district there is a unique ambidextrous school named Veena Vadini School in Budhela village, where students are taught to write simultaneously with both hands.

== Sports ==
=== Baseball ===
Ambidexterity is advantageous in the sport of baseball, most commonly seen in hitters. A "switch hitter" is highly prized because a batter is more likely to hit the ball successfully if they bat with the opposite hand to the pitcher's throwing hand. An ambidextrous hitter can gain this advantage against both right and left-handed pitchers. Pete Rose, the record holder for most hits in Major League Baseball, was a switch hitter.

Switch pitchers are comparatively rare in contrast to switch hitters. Tony Mullane won 284 games in the 19th century. Elton Chamberlain and Larry Corcoran were also notable ambidextrous pitchers. In the 20th century, Greg A. Harris was the only major league pitcher to pitch with both his left and his right arm. A natural right-hander, by 1986 he could throw well enough with his left hand that he felt capable of pitching with either hand in a game. Harris was not allowed to throw left-handed in a regular-season game until September 1995 in the penultimate game of his career. Against the Cincinnati Reds in the ninth inning, Harris (then a member of the Montreal Expos) retired Reggie Sanders pitching right-handed, then switched to his left hand for the next two hitters, Hal Morris and Ed Taubensee, who both batted left-handed. Harris walked Morris but got Taubensee to ground out. He then went back to his right hand to retire Bret Boone to end the inning.

In the 21st century there is only one major league pitcher, Pat Venditte of the Seattle Mariners, who regularly pitched with both arms. Venditte became the 21st century's first switch pitcher in the major leagues with his debut on June 5, 2015, against the Boston Red Sox, pitching two innings, allowing only one hit and recording five outs right-handed and one out left handed. During his career, an eponymous "Venditte Rule" was created restricting the ability of a pitcher to change arms in the middle of an at-bat.

Billy Wagner was a natural right-handed pitcher in his youth, but after breaking his throwing arm twice, he taught himself how to use his left arm by throwing nothing but fastballs against a barn wall. He became a dominant left-handed relief pitcher, most known for his 100+ mph fastball. In his 1999 season, Wagner captured the National League Relief Man of the Year Award as a Houston Astro, and was elected to the Baseball Hall of Fame in 2025.

St. Louis Cardinals pitcher Brett Cecil is naturally right-handed, but starting from a very early age, threw with his left. As such, he writes and performs most tasks with the right side of his body, but throws with his left.

=== Basketball ===
In basketball a player may choose to make a pass or shot with the weaker hand. NBA stars LeBron James, Larry Bird, Kyrie Irving, Rasheed Wallace, Carlos Boozer, David Lee, John Wall, Derrick Rose, Chandler Parsons, Andrew Bogut, John Henson, Michael Beasley, and Jerryd Bayless are ambidextrous players, as was Kobe Bryant. Bogut and Henson are both stronger in the post with their left-handed hook shot than they are with their natural right hands. Brothers Marc and Pau Gasol can make hook shots with either hand while the right hand is dominant for each. Bob Cousy, a Boston Celtics legend was forced to play with his left hand in high school when he injured his right hand, thus making him effectively ambidextrous. Mike Conley shoots left-handed, but has preferred to shoot floaters right handed, as he does everything else right-handed off the court. Ben Simmons and Luke Kennard are also natural right-handers shooting left-handed. Tristan Thompson is a natural left-hander, and was a left-handed shooter, but has shot right-handed since the 2013–2014 season. He does perform left-handed hook shots more often. Los Angeles Lakers center DeAndre Jordan who is left-handed, shoots with his left hand but has been known to dunk with his right hand, spin clockwise in his 360 dunks, and shoot right handed hook shots more accurately and from further out. Charlotte Hornets power forward Miles Bridges is a left-handed shooter; however, he dunks the ball and blocks shots more frequently with his right hand. Former Los Angeles Lakers center Roy Hibbert shoots his hook shots equally well with either hand. Former Oklahoma City Thunder left-handed point guard Derek Fisher used to dunk with his right hand in his early years. Candace Parker, forward for the Chicago Sky, also has equal dominance with either hand. Los Angeles Lakers superstar Kobe Bryant shot with either hand, although his right hand was dominant: due to an injury to the right hand, he was forced to shoot with his left. Paul George, Tracy McGrady and Vince Carter are all noted to be right-handed, but rotates clockwise for dunks, but Carter is able to also spin counterclockwise, as he did during high school. McGrady also spins anti-clockwise for his baseline dunks. Larry Bird, LeBron James, Paul Millsap, Russell Westbrook, Danny Ainge and Gary Payton shoot right-handed, but do almost everything left-handed off the courts, but Bird once had a game in which he only shot left-handed running hook shots, cross passes and layups. Ronnie Price, however has a tendency to dunk with his left hand, but he is a right-handed shooter. Josh McRoberts is known to be a left handed shooter but does everything with his right hand such as his famous dunks. Ivica Zubac is a right handed shooter, but can shoot hook shots with both hands, and is more accurate with his left handed hooks. Greg Monroe is also a left-handed shooter but does right handed jump hooks and everything else right handed off the court.

Trevor Booker is left handed for shooting a basketball but writes with his right hand. Ben Simmons shoots jumpers and free throws left-handed, but does everything else right-handed, including dunking, throwing long passes and writing. He also shoots more right-handed non-jumpers (layups, floaters and hook shots).

=== Board sports ===
In skateboarding, being able to skate successfully with not only one's dominant foot forward but also the less dominant one is called "skating switch", and is a prized ability. To illustrate the stances further; there is "regular" which is left shoulder and foot towards the front of the board and the opposite (right shoulder foot towards the front) is referred to as "goofy." These terms are also used in surfing and snowboarding. When skateboarding, whether one pushes with their front or back foot determines whether they are considered regular versus regular-mongo or goofy versus goofy-mongo. The ability to ride both regular and goofy is considered to be "switch stance". Notable switch skateboarders include Rodney Mullen, Eric Koston, Guy Mariano, Paul Rodriguez Jr., Mike Mo Capaldi, and Bob Burnquist. Similarly, surfers who ride equally well in either stance are said to be surfing "switch”. Snowboarding, at an advanced level, requires the ability to ride equally well in either stance.

=== Combat sports ===
In combat sports fighters may choose to face their opponent with either the left shoulder forward in a right-handed stance ("orthodox") or the right shoulder forward in a left-handed stance ("south-paw"), thus a degree of cross dominance is useful. In boxing, Manny Pacquiao has a southpaw stance in the ring, and is ambidextrous outside the ring. Also, in mixed martial arts, many naturally left-handed strikers like Lyoto Machida and Anderson Silva will switch stances in order to counter opponent's strikes or takedown attempts to stay standing. Some fighters choose to fight in a southpaw stance despite their dominant hand being their right, one such fighter being Vasyl Lomachenko. This gives access to a strong and precise jab from the leading hand, which is arguably the most important strike in boxing for setting up combos and interrupting your opponent during their attacks. Bruce Lee also practiced this same method of fighting with his dominant hand forward. Left handed fighters such as Oscar De La Hoya (who had been converted to right handed after an injury as a child), Miguel Cotto, Andre Ward, and Gerry Cooney fought in orthodox. This made their left hooks their most powerful weapons, along with enhancing the strength of their jab.

=== Cricket ===
In cricket, it is also beneficial to be able to use both arms. Ambidextrous fielders can make one-handed catches or throws with either hand. Sachin Tendulkar uses his left hand for writing, but bats and bowls with his right hand; the same goes for Ajinkya Rahane, Kane Williamson, and Shane Watson. There are many players who are naturally right-handed but bat left and vice versa. Sourav Ganguly, Thisara Perera uses his right hand for writing and bowls with the right hand, too, but bats with his left hand. Players due to injuries may also switch arms for fielding. Zaheer Khan bowls left-arm fast-medium but bats right handed. Phillip Hughes batted, bowled, and fielded left-handed before a shoulder injury. Australian batsman George Bailey also due to sustaining an injury, taught himself to throw with his weaker left arm. He is now often seen throughout matches switching between arms as he throws the ball. See also reverse sweep and switch hitting. David Warner has batted right-handed in high school, and has practiced right-handed as well, when he is normally a left-handed switch-hitter. Alastair Cook, Jimmy Anderson, Stuart Broad, Ben Stokes, Eoin Morgan, Ben Dunk, Adam Gilchrist, Matthew Hayden, Travis Head, Chris Gayle, Gautam Gambhir, Rishabh Pant, Ishan Kishan, Devdutt Padikkal, Yashasvi Jaiswal, Smriti Mandhana and Kagiso Rabada are natural right-handers, but bat left-handed.

Michael Clarke is naturally a left handed person who bowls left handed but bats right handed.

Akshay Karnewar is an ambidextrous bowler. Originally, he only bowled with his right hand, but since he does everything else with his left hand, he was taught to bowl left-handed as well but needs to signal to the umpire when he switches hands when bowling to allow for the field to change. He is a left-handed batsman. As an off-spinner and left-arm orthodox spin, the ball will always spin towards the batsman (OB vs. RHB; SLO vs. LHB), or away from opposite-handed batsmen, which is the predominant role of switch-handed spinners.

Sri Lankan Kusal Perera started his cricket as a right hand batsman, until he changed to left hand to mimic his favourite cricketer Sanath Jayasuriya. Jayasuriya bats and bowls left handed but writes with his right hand. Another Sri Lankan Kamindu Mendis is also a handy ambidextrous bowler. He can bowl orthodox left-arm spin and he can bowl right-arm offspin as well. Yasir Jan, however is a fast bowler both right and left handed and tops over 140 km/h with both hands, with his right arm being faster.

Jofra Archer warms up with slow orthodox left-arm spin, and Jos Buttler practiced left-handed as a club cricketer.

=== Cue sports ===
In cue sports, players can reach farther across the table if they are able to play with either hand, since the cue must either be placed on the left or the right side of the body. English snooker player Ronnie O'Sullivan is a rarity amongst top snooker professionals, in that he is able to play to world-class standard with either hand. While he lacks power in his left arm, his ability to alternate hands allows him to take shots that would otherwise require awkward cueing or the use of a rest. When he first displayed this ability in the 1996 World Championship against the Canadian player Alain Robidoux, Robidoux accused him of disrespect. O'Sullivan responded that he played better with his left hand than Robidoux could with his right. O'Sullivan was summoned to a disciplinary hearing in response to Robidoux's formal complaint, where he had to prove that he could play to a high level with his left hand.

=== Figure skating ===
In figure skating, most skaters who are right-handed spin and jump to the left, and vice versa for left-handed individuals, but it also down to habit for ballerinas. Olympic Champion figure skater John Curry notably performed his jumps in one direction (anti-clockwise) while spinning predominantly in the other. Very few skaters have such an ability to perform jumps and spins in both directions, and it is now considered a "difficult variation" in spins under the ISU Judging System to rotate in the non-dominant direction. Michelle Kwan used an opposite-rotating camel spin in some of her programs as a signature move. No point bonus exists for opposite direction jumps or bi-directional combination jumps, despite their being much harder to perfect. Nobody can perform a jump sequence (because it requires change of edge, whereas a combo is maintained on the same edge) from clockwise to anti-clockwise, or vice versa.

=== Football codes ===
==== American football ====
In American football, it is especially advantageous to be able to use either arm to perform various tasks. Ambidextrous receivers can make one-handed catches with either hand; linemen can hold their shoulders square and produce an equal amount of power with both arms; and punters can handle a bad snap and roll out and punt with either leg, limiting the chance of a block. Naturally right-handed quarterbacks may have to perform left-handed passes to avoid sacks. Chris Jones is cross-dominant. Although he is a left-footed punter, he throws with his right. Chris Hanson was dual-footed, able to punt with either foot.

=== Golf ===
Some players find cross-dominance advantageous in golf, especially if a left-handed player utilizes right-handed clubs. Having more precise coordination with the left hand is believed to allow better-controlled, and stronger drives. Mac O'Grady was a touring pro who played right-handed, yet could play "scratch" (no handicap) golf left-handed. He lobbied the USGA for years to be certified as an amateur "lefty" and a pro "righty" to no avail. Although not ambidextrous, Phil Mickelson and Mike Weir are both right-handers who golf left-handed; Ben Hogan was the opposite, being a natural left-hander who played golf right-handed, as is Cristie Kerr. This is known as cross-dominance or mixed-handedness.

=== Hockey ===
Ice hockey players may shoot from the left or right side of the body. For the most part, right-handed players shoot left and, likewise, most left-handed players shoot right as the player will often wield the stick one-handed. The dominant hand is typically placed on the top of the stick to allow for better stickhandling and control of the puck. Gordie Howe was one of few players capable of doing both, although this was at a time when the blade of the stick was not curved.

Another ice hockey goaltender Bill Durnan, had the ability to catch the puck with either hand. He won the Vezina Trophy, then for the National Hockey League's goalie with the fewest goals allowed six times out of only seven seasons. He had developed this ability playing for church-league teams in Toronto and Montreal to make up for his poor lateral movement. He wore custom gloves that permitted him to hold his stick with either hand. Most goaltenders nowadays choose to catch with their non-dominant hand.

Field hockey players are forced to play right-handed. The rules of the game denote that the ball can only be struck with the flat side of the stick. Only one player, Laeeq Ahmed on the Pakistan National Hockey team, played with unorthodox left hand below and right hand up side of stick grip with full command. He played from 1991 to 1992 for the national team. Perhaps to avoid confusing referees, there are no left-handed sticks. In floorball, like ice hockey, right-handed players shoot left and, likewise, most left-handed players shoot right as the player will often wield the stick one-handed. Floorball goalkeepers do not use a stick, so they have two glove hands, and act much like a soccer goalkeeper, but with an ice hockey helmet. When they venture out of the goal box, they act just like an outfield soccer player.

=== Lacrosse ===
In field lacrosse, which is more popular in the United States, it is extremely advantageous to be able to use both hands, as players can play on both sides of the field and are harder to defend against. Usually in field lacrosse, all players except goalies, but especially offensive players, are expected to be able to catch and throw with their weak hand. However, in box lacrosse, which is more popular in Canada, players often only use their dominant hand, like in hockey.

=== Martial arts ===
The traditional martial arts tend to feature a larger number of practitioners who have intentionally developed ambidexterity to a high degree, compared to athletes in combat sports. This is because unlike sports, which have structured rules and common player preferences, traditional martial arts are intended for situations such as self-defense, in which a wider array of physical challenges may occur.

Some arts and schools practice all or most techniques and movements with both sides, while others emphasize that some techniques should only be trained on the right or the left (though both sides tend to eventually receive nearly equal attention). This may be for a number of reasons. Some of these arts rely on the tendency of right-handed people to move differently with the left side than with the right, and attempt to take advantage of this. Similarly, certain weapons are more often carried on one side. For instance, most weapons in ancient China were wielded primarily with the right hand and on the right side; this habit has carried on to the practice of those weapons in modern times. As an example, in xingyiquan, most schools that teach spear-fighting only practice on the right side, although much of the rest of the art is ambidextrous in practice.

=== Professional wrestling ===
Shawn Michaels is ambidextrous. He typically kicks with his right leg in Sweet Chin Music, but uses either arm for his signature elbow drop, depending on the position.

=== Racing ===
In professional sports car racing, drivers who participate in various events in both the United States and Europe will sometimes encounter machines with the steering wheel mounted on different sides of the car. While steering ability is largely unaffected, the hand used for shifting changes is, due to the shift pattern relative to the driver changing, i.e., a gear change that requires moving the lever toward the driver in a left-hand-drive vehicle becomes a movement away from the driver in a right-hand-drive vehicle. A driver skilled in shifting with the opposite hand is at an advantage.

=== Racket sports ===
In tennis, a player may be able to reach balls on the backhand side more easily if they're able to use the weaker hand. An example of a player who is ambidextrous is Luke Jensen. Due to a physical advantage on the space of time needed when matching the ball with the racket simultaneously with tagging the opponent's movement, being laterality-crossed on eyedness with handedness may be a decisive factor for outstanding performance, since the hand which strikes the ball can do it while the overriding eye, matching with this hand, can be tagging the opponent's movement-decisions. Such have the case of Rafael Nadal who uses his right hand for writing, but plays tennis with left. There are many players who are naturally right handed, but play lefty and vice versa. Evgenia Kulikovskaya is also an ambidextrous player, Kulikovskaya played with two forehands and no backhand, switching her racket hand depending on where the ball was coming. Jan-Michael Gambill is the opposite case of Kulikovskaya, since he played with a two-handed forehand and backhand, although he served with his right hand. Other famous examples of a two-handed forehand are Fabrice Santoro and Monica Seles. Seles' playing style was unusual in that she hit with two hands on both sides and, at the same time, always kept her (dominant) left hand at the base of her racket. This meant that she hit her forehand cross-handed. Maria Sharapova is also known to be ambidextrous Cheong-eui Kim is a truly ambidextrous player with no backhand, and can serve left-handed as well as right-handed.

Some table tennis players have used their ability to hit with their non-dominant hand to return balls out of reach of their dominant hand's backhand, most notably Timo Boll, a former world #1 player.

Although it is quite uncommon, in badminton, ambidextrous players are able to switch the racquet between their hands, often to get to the awkward backhand corner quickly. As badminton can be a very fast sport at professional levels of play, players might not have time to switch the racquet, as this disrupts their reaction time.

=== Rugby ===
In rugby league and rugby union being ambidextrous is an advantage when it comes to passing the ball between teammates as well as being able to use both feet by the halves is an advantage in gaining field position by kicking the ball ahead. Jonny Wilkinson is a prime example of a union player who is good at kicking with both feet, he is left handed and normally place kicks using his left, but he dropped the goal that won the Rugby World Cup in 2003 with his right. Dan Carter is actually right handed, but kicks predominantly with his left, sometimes with his right.

=== Volleyball ===
A volleyball player has to be ambidextrous to control the ball to either direction and performing basic digs. On the other hand, the setter has to be proficient in performing dump sets with either hand to throw off blockers. Wing spikers that can spike with either hand can alter trajectories to throw off receivers' timing.

== In art ==
Although most artists have a favored hand, some artists use both of their hands for arts such as drawing and sculpting. It is believed that Leonardo da Vinci utilized both of his hands after an injury to his right hand during his early childhood.

A contemporary artist, Gur Keren, can draw with both his hands and even feet. Thea Alba, a German, could write with all ten fingers.

== In music ==
In drum and bugle corps (and drum and bell corps), snare drummers, quads (tenors), and bass drummers need to be somewhat ambidextrous. Since they have to abide by what the composer/arranger has written, they have to learn to play evenly in terms of dynamics and speed with their right and left hands. Beatles drummer Ringo Starr is left-handed, but plays a right-handed drum kit. American instrumental guitarist Michael Angelo Batio is known for being able to play both right-handed and left-handed guitar proficiently. The ambidexterity of Jimi Hendrix has been explored in a psychology, but he was known for playing a standard right-handed guitar flipped to make it left-handed. The guitarist Duane Allman was the reverse of Hendrix, being left-handed and playing right-handed guitars. Shara Lin is naturally left-handed, but plays the violin and guitar right handed. Lin can also play the piano with her left hand while playing the zither with her right.

Despite some instruments having left-handed versions, many instruments like violin, viola and the cello, are exclusively right-handed.

== Ambisinistrality ==
A related variation to one that is ambidextrous is where a person is "ambisinistrous" (or "ambilevous"). This term is a near inverse to ambidexterity as Latin root of the word ambi- means both and the Latin root of the word -sinistral means "left", being derived from the word sinister. The term "ambisinistral" can be directly interpreted as "both left" or "both sinister".

The term is used in non-scientific manners to describe individuals who have two non-dominant hands, as both hands are either clumsy or insufficient in motor skill and are therefore used equally as much. In a 1992 New York Times Q&A article on ambidexterity, the term was used to describe people "...with both hands as skilled as a right-hander's left hand."

== See also ==
- Brain asymmetry
- Cross-dominance
- Dual brain theory
- Dual wield
- Handedness
- Laterality
- Lateralization of brain function
