= Cross-dominance =

Handedness favoring for different tasks

Cross-dominance, also known as mixed-handedness, hand confusion, or mixed dominance, is a motor skill manifestation in which a person favors one hand for some tasks and the other hand for others, or a hand and the contralateral leg. For example, a cross-dominant person might write with the left hand and do everything else with the right one, or manage and kick a ball preferentially with the left leg.

Overall, being mixed handed seems to result in better performance than being strongly handed for sports such as basketball, ice hockey, and field hockey. What these sports have in common is that they require active body movements and also an ability to respond to either side. The situation is reversed for racquet sports such as tennis. Individuals with crossed hand-eye preference seem to be much better at gymnastics, running, and basketball because of the way in which congruent and crossed sided individuals position their bodies. Coren, Stanley. The Left-Hander Syndrome. Chapter 3.

== See also ==
- Ambidexterity
- Dual wield
