= Body-relative directions =

Relative coordinate axes

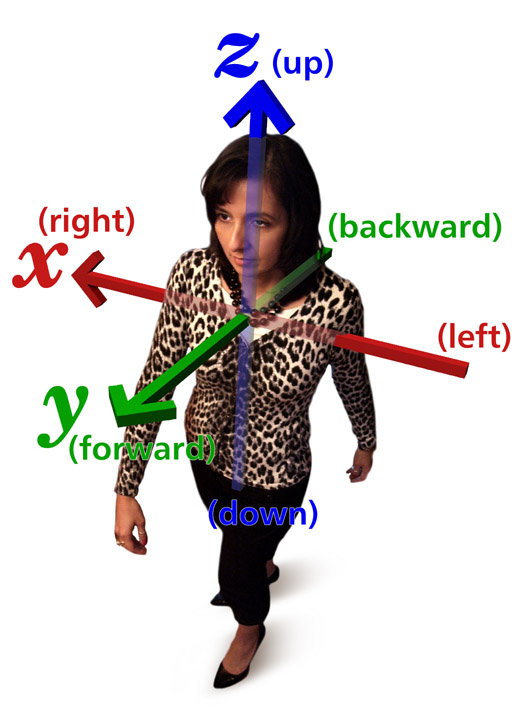
A non-flopped image of a right-handed Cartesian coordinate system, illustrating the x (left to right), y (backward to forward) and z (down to up) coordinate axes relative to a human being

Body-relative directions (also known as relative directions or egocentric coordinates) are geometrical directions relative to an object such as a person's body or a road sign.

The most common ones are: left and right; backward (or posterior) and forward (or anterior); down (or inferior) and up (or superior). These six directions form three pairs of orthogonal coordinate axes, often given as a right-handed coordinate system as (left→right, backward→forward, down→up).

== Traditions and conventions ==
Since definitions of left and right based on the geometry of the natural environment are unwieldy, in practice, the meaning of relative direction words is conveyed through tradition, acculturation, education, and direct reference. One common definition of up and down uses the gravity of Earth as a frame of reference. Since there is a very noticeable force of gravity acting between the Earth and any other nearby object, down is defined as that direction consistent with the local gravitational field unit vector, in other words, the direction which an object moves in reference to the Earth when the object is allowed to fall freely. Up is then defined as the opposite direction of down. Another common definition uses a human body, standing upright, as a frame of reference. In that case, up is defined as the direction from feet to head, perpendicular to the surface of the Earth. In most cases, up is a directionally oriented position generally opposite to that of the pull of gravity.

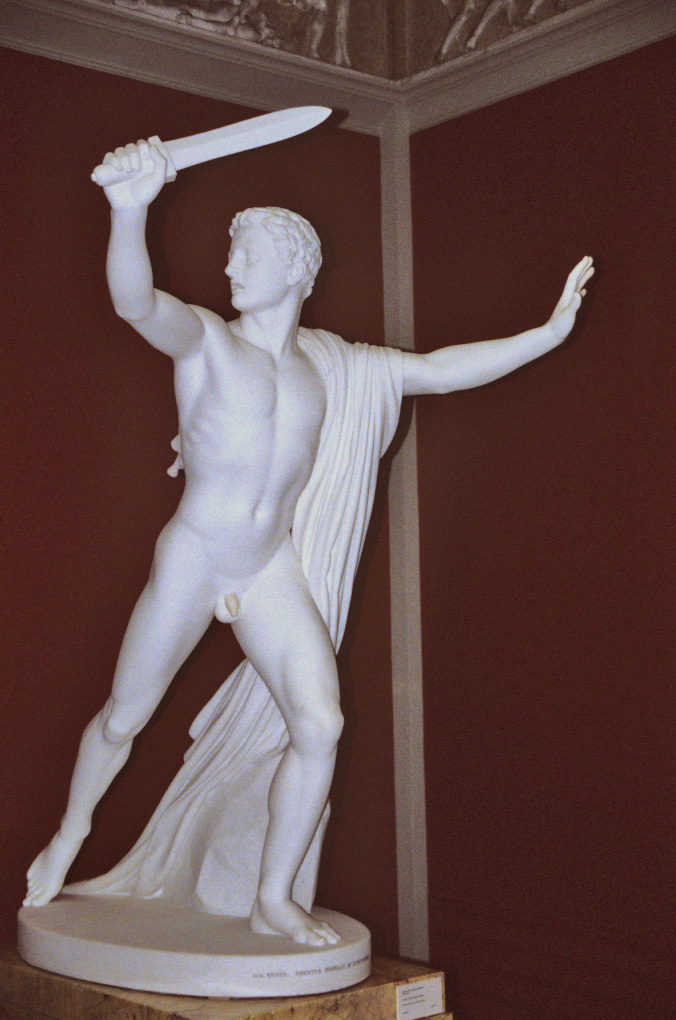
This statue holds a sword in its proper right hand.

In situations where a common frame of reference is needed, it is most common to use an egocentric view. A simple example is road signage. Another example is stage blocking, where "stage left" "stage right" are, by convention, defined from the point of view of actors facing the audience. "Upstage" and "downstage" do not follow gravity but by convention mean away from and towards the audience. An example of a non-egocentric view is page layout, where the relative terms "upper half" "left margin," etc. are defined in terms of the observer but employed in reverse for a type compositor, returning to an egocentric view. In medicine and science, where precise definitions are crucial, relative directions (left and right) are the sides of the organism, not those of the observer. The same is true in heraldry, where left and right in a coat of arms is treated as if the shield were being held by the armiger. To avoid confusion, Latin terminology is employed: dexter and sinister for right and left. Proper right and proper left are terms mainly used to describe artistic images, and overcome the potential confusion that a figure's "own" right or "proper right" hand is on the left hand as the viewer sees it from the front.

Forward and backward may be defined by referring to an object's or organism's motion. Forward is defined as the direction in which the object is moving. Backward is then defined as the opposite direction to forward. Alternatively, 'forward' may be the direction pointed by the observer's nose, defining 'backward' as the direction from the nose to the sagittal border in the observer's skull. With respect to a ship 'forward' would indicate the relative position of any object lying in the direction the ship is pointing. For symmetrical objects, it is also necessary to define forward and backward in terms of expected direction. Many mass transit trains are built symmetrically with paired control booths, and definitions of forward, backward, left, and right are temporary.

Given significant distance from the magnetic poles, one can figure which hand is which using a magnetic compass and the sun. Facing the sun, before noon, the north pointer of the compass points to the "left" hand. After noon, it points to the "right".

== Geometry of the natural environment ==
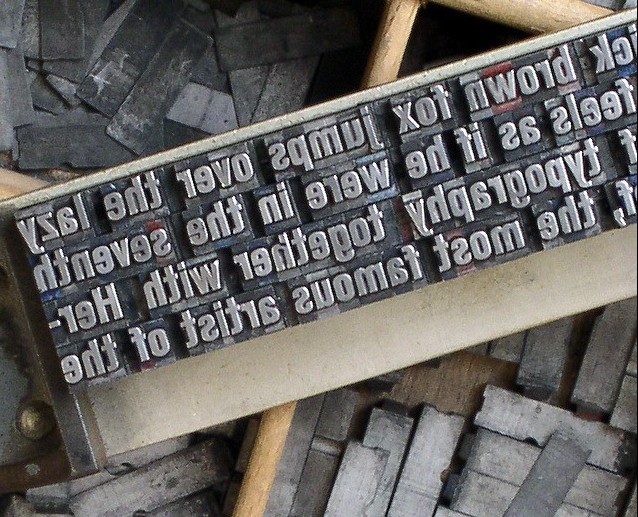
Type compositing

A right-hand rule is one common way to relate three principal directions. For many years a fundamental question in physics was whether a left-hand rule would be equivalent. Many natural structures, including human bodies, follow a certain "handedness", but it was widely assumed that nature did not distinguish the two possibilities. This changed with the discovery of parity violations in particle physics. If a sample of cobalt-60 atoms is magnetized so that they spin counterclockwise around some axis, the beta radiation resulting from their nuclear decay will be preferentially directed opposite that axis. Since counter-clockwise may be defined in terms of up, forward, and right, this experiment unambiguously differentiates left from right using only natural elements: if they were reversed, or the atoms spun clockwise, the radiation would follow the spin axis instead of being opposite to it (see the Wu experiment).

== Body-fixed frames in mechanics ==
In rigid body dynamics, a body-fixed frame (sometimes called a body-relative frame) is a frame of reference attached to a moving body and carried along with it. Standard treatments distinguish this moving frame from a inertial frame, also called a space frame (or world frame).

The same instantaneous angular velocity can be expressed either in space-frame coordinates or in body-frame coordinates. In robotics and mechanics these are often called the spatial angular velocity and the body angular velocity. The body-relative and space-relative frames satisfy different transformation laws under rotations of space.

This mechanical usage is more specific than the everyday idea of relative direction: it refers to a coordinate frame attached to the body itself, and to physical quantities measured in that moving frame.

== Nautical terminology ==
Aport (towards the left side, called port), astarboard (towards the right side, called starboard), aft or astern (backwards, towards the stern), and fore or foreward (towards the bow) are nautical terms that convey an impersonal relative direction in the context of the moving frame of persons aboard a ship. The need for impersonal terms is most clearly seen in a rowing shell where the majority of the crew face aft ("backwards"), hence the oars to their right are actually on the port side of the boat. Rowers eschew the terms left, right, port and starboard in favor of stroke-side and bow-side. The usage derives from the tradition of having the stroke (the rower closest to the stern of the boat) oar on the port side of the boat.

== Cultures without relative directions ==
Most human cultures use relative directions for reference, but there are exceptions. Some Australian Aboriginal languages like Guugu Yimithirr, Kayardild and Kuuk Thaayorre have no words denoting the egocentric directions; instead, speakers exclusively refer to cardinal directions, even when describing small-scale spaces. For instance, if they wanted someone to move over on the car seat to make room, they might say "move a bit to the east". To tell someone where exactly they left something in their house, they might say, "I left it on the southern edge of the western table." Or they might warn a person to "look out for that big ant just north of your foot". Other peoples "from Polynesia to Mexico and from Namibia to Bali" similarly have predominantly "geographic languages". American Sign Language makes heavy use of geographical direction through absolute orientation.

== Left–right discrimination and left–right confusion ==
Left–right confusion (LRC) is the inability to accurately differentiate between left and right directions. Conversely, left–right discrimination (LRD) refers to a person's ability to differentiate between left and right. LRC is reported by approximately 15% of the population according to the 2020 research by Van der Ham and her colleagues. People who have LRC can typically perform daily navigational tasks, such as driving according to road signs or following a map, but may have difficulty performing actions that require a precise understanding of directional commands, such as ballroom dancing.

== See also ==
- Anatomical terms of location
- Bias against left-handed people
- Cardinal direction
- Cerebral hemisphere
- Clock position
- Dexter and sinister
- Direction determination
- Horizontal direction
- Dextral and sinistral
- Handedness
- List of international common standards
- Orientation (geometry)
- Port and starboard
- Rotation
- Sense of direction
- Slant direction
- Terms of orientation
- Topographical disorientation
- Visuospatial dysgnosia
- Windward and leeward
