= Sense of direction =

Ability to perceive one's physical location

Sense of direction is the ability to know one's location and perform wayfinding. It is related to cognitive maps, spatial awareness, and spatial cognition. Sense of direction can be impaired by brain damage, such as in the case of topographical disorientation.

Humans create spatial maps whenever they go somewhere. Neurons called place cells inside the hippocampus fire individually while a person makes their way through an environment. This was first discovered in rats, when the neurons of the hippocampus were recorded. Certain neurons fired whenever the rat was in a certain area of its environment. These neurons form a grid when they are all put together on the same plane.

== The Santa Barbara Sense-of-Direction Scale ==
Sense of direction can be measured with the Santa Barbara Sense-of-Direction Scale, a self-assessed psychometric test designed in 2002. This scale has been used to study sense of direction in many contexts, such as driving. It is a standardized self-report measure that assesses an individual's sense of direction. It consists of 27 self-referential statements about some aspect of environmental spatial cognition to be rated on a scale from 1 (strongly agree) to 7 (strongly disagree). Approximately half of the items are stated positively and half are stated negatively. The SBSOD has been found to be internally consistent and has good test-retest reliability. It has also been validated through a series of four studies which suggest that the SBSOD is related to tasks that require one to update location in space as a result of self-motion. The scale has been used in research and practical applications related to environmental spatial ability, providing a tool for assessing individual differences in sense of direction (SOD) that may have implications for navigation, wayfinding, and other spatial tasks. The SBSOD cannot, however, reliably predict deficits of the peripheral vestibular system, which commonly cause spatial impairment.

== The German Questionnaire on Spatial Strategies ==
The German Questionnaire on Spatial Strategies (Fragebogen Raumliche Strategien - FRS) is a self-report measure that has been standardized to assess an individual's spatial strategies, including their sense of direction, spatial strategies, allocentric mental map strategy, and knowledge of cardinal directions. The FRS has been validated with the German population and has demonstrated reliability and validity. It consists of 19 items where one is required to answer according to a scale from 1 (do not agree at all) to 7 (strongly agree). The questionnaire allows to assess three aspects: global/egocentric strategy, allocentric mental map, and cardinal direction.

The standardized norms for the FRS have been established for both gender and different age groups. The study found that there were small differences between age groups for the global/egocentric (SOD) scale and the allocentric mental map strategy scale, with slightly higher ratings of older age groups of men for both scales and for women only for the allocentric mental map scale. However, for the cardinal directions scale, age-related differences favoring the oldest age group were medium (women) and large (men). Therefore, it can be concluded that older individuals tend to perform better than younger individuals on some of the scales of the FRS, particularly on the cardinal directions scale. Confirmatory factor analysis was used to examine the construct validity of the 3-factor structure of spatial strategies, providing evidence for its construct validity. Additionally, male and female participants differed significantly on all three factors, and there were significant main effects for age on all three scales as well.

== The Questionnaires on Spatial Representation ==
The Questionnaires on Spatial Representation (QSR) is a standardized self-report scale that assesses the sense of direction, and individual's spatial representation preferences. The QSR includes items that assess sense of direction and survey (map-like) preference, route/landmark preference, knowledge and use of cardinal points. The factors were shown to be related to spatial abilities and environment learning. It validated with the Italian population and confirmatory factor analysis individuated three-factor composition. It consists of 11 items answered on a scale from 1 (not at all) to 5 (very much). This questionnaire detects individual differences in SOD, spatial strategies, and associated variables. The QSR has been used alongside other measures, such as the SBSOD scale, a scale on spatial self-efficacy (which showed to be positively related) and a spatial anxiety scale (which showed to be negatively related). These measures have been used to examine the relationships between various spatial abilities and better understand how these abilities relate to individual differences in anxiety and self-efficacy.

== Gender differences in self-evaluation of sense of direction ==
Due to the varied and multi-faceted nature of the relationship between navigation ability and self-reports, between-subject factors (e.g., gender, education, age) and cross-cultural differences (e.g., gender stereotypes, country-specific education, social policies, etc.) influence self-evaluation and performance in wayfinding tasks.

The use of standardised measures in research has helped observe a gender dynamic on an individual and a group level: men self-rate themselves as better navigators with respect to women.

It has been observed that women are modest in their responses to self-estimate questions in spatial, navigating or wayfinding tasks due to spatial abilities being considered as more masculine. Women, therefore, tend to conform to the negative stereotypes of their own abilities, the awareness of which hinders performance on these tasks by women. Researchers Nori and Piccardi (2015) report however, that the performance of highly competent women on a masculine task predicts better overall wayfinding ability.

Research carried out by Walkowiak et al. (2022) across larger cross-national samples suggests the impact of cultural norms (country-specific stereotypic gender beliefs, societal norms, and cultural variation) on self-estimates in women. Relatively consistent patterns for both men and women across countries have been observed: for countries with high or low self-ratings, both women and men rated themselves as high or low respectively.

Moreover, the researchers also observed that the navigation performance gap between men and women was correlated with the gender gap index, with higher performance gap linked to higher gender gap. They also examined the self-ratings – performance gap in relation to such a metric and found a significant positive correlation between the self-rating – performance gap and the gender inequality index of a country. Thus, the more unequal a country in terms of gender gap, the greater the overconfidence of men in self-estimating their performance on spatial tasks.

== Age and sense of direction ==
There are some studies that show a decline in wayfinding attitudes in older adults compared to younger ones.

The study, made by Walkowiak et al., showed that asking the participants to self-rate their wayfinding abilities as either very good, good, bad, or very bad (that resemble at least in part sense of direction) there is an overestimation amongst the oldest male participants, and they rated their wayfinding skills to be better than that of the youngest males. However, despite the higher scores in self-reported navigation abilities, the wayfinding performance (based on tasks using a mobile videogame) seems to be getting worse with the increasing age.

In further across-lifespan studies females self-reported going out less and not using navigation aids, such as maps and GPS, preferring the use of verbal directions with respect to males. In this study they also examined the relationship between age and sense of direction, and they found that older people are also less likely to go out and reach places, but because of this they also got lost less in unfamiliar environments. This suggests a strategy used by older people, because they might be scared of losing their ways, so they avoid scenarios where that might happen. Concerning GPS use, the researchers also found modest evidence that older people as well prefer verbal directions to navigation aids compared to younger people.

== See also ==
- Direction determination
- Left-right confusion
- Personal relative direction
- Spatial ability
- Spatial disorientation
