= Getting lost =

Losing spatial reference

Getting lost is the occurrence of a person or animal losing spatial reference. This situation consists of two elements: the feeling of disorientation and a spatial component. While getting lost, being lost or totally lost, etc. are popular expressions for someone in a desperate situation (perhaps not literally lost), getting lost is also a positive term for a goal some travellers have in exploring without a plan. Getting lost can also occur in metaphorical senses, such as being unable to follow a conversation.

== Process ==
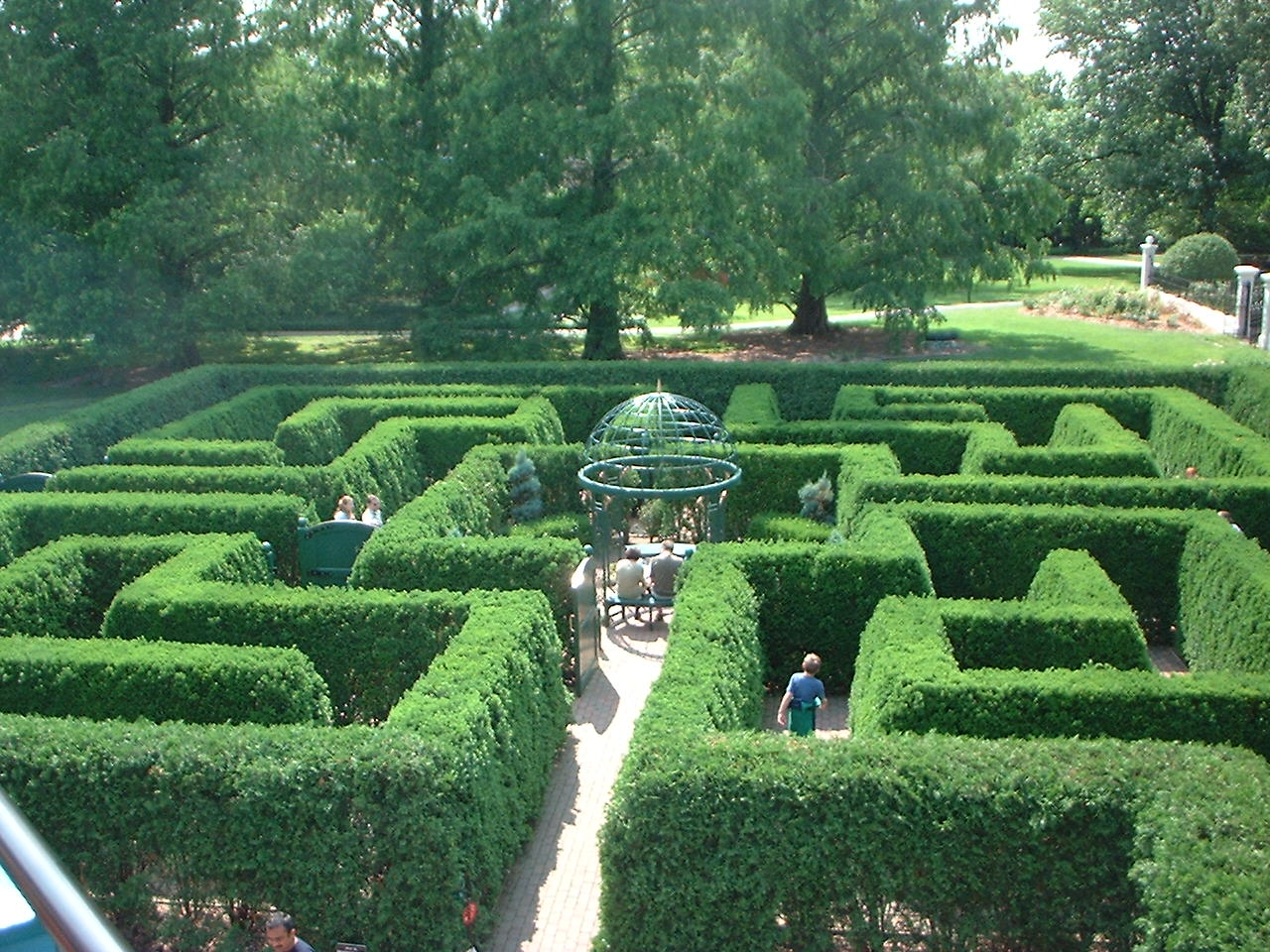
In a maze, one can get lost on a voluntary basis

Psychology and neuroscience help to understand the underlying processes which take place before, during and after getting lost. Getting lost is an aspect of behavioral geography, in which human wayfinding and cognitive and environmental factors play a role. For successful travel, it is necessary to be able to identify origin and destination, to determine turn angles, to identify segment lengths and directions of movement, to recognize on-route and distant landmarks. This information is required to plot a course designed to reach a destination (previously known or unknown) or to return to a home base after wandering. If a destination is known but is not directly connected by a path, road, or track to the origin, successful travel may involve search and exploration, spatial updating of one's location, finding familiar landmarks, recognition of segment length and sequencing, identification of a frame of reference. Human movement is often guided by external aids (cartographic maps, charts, compasses, pedometers, and the like).

Getting lost is particularly problematic for children (who have not yet developed tools and strategies for maintaining their bearings) and for the elderly, particularly those experiencing the onset of dementia. Such individuals "can get lost while trying to find their local shop – due to their diminishing memory they can forget where the shop is, or where they live and why they went out of their house in the first place". People experiencing dementia also get lost more easily in poor visibility conditions because the mind fails to appropriately fill in cues as to missing landmarks. Getting lost in unfamiliar terrain can lead even an adult with a healthy mind to panic and engage in unthinking behaviors that make the situation even worse. The tendency of the mind to seek patterns and familiar signs can contribute to this in two ways. First the lost person may mistake features of the terrain for markers that were seen before they became lost, creating a false sense of orientation that may lead the lost person to pursue routes that take them even further off course. Second, the lost person may mistake such features for markers that were seen after they became lost, creating a false sense that they have made a circle and returned to an earlier point of their effort to find their bearings. This may result from topographical disorientation, the inability to orient oneself in one's surroundings, sometimes as a result of focal brain damage. This disability may result from the inability to make use of selective spatial information (e.g., environmental landmarks) or to orient by means of specific cognitive strategies such as the ability to form a mental representation of the environment, also known as a cognitive map. Search and rescue teams have identified some behavioral patterns in people who get lost in wilderness settings, and they use those patterns to improve the likelihood of finding lost people. For example, lost people tend to follow linear features (e.g., a stream) and to go downhill.

Getting lost at sea is a special case of getting lost, as large bodies of water may be bereft of landmarks. A person who becomes lost at sea is called a castaway, and a number of people have disappeared mysteriously at sea, with some presumably having first gotten lost at sea. Getting lost at sea in the water (as opposed to in a vessel) presents different environmental threats to getting lost on land, due to immersion and the potential for hypothermia.

== Historical occasions ==
There have been several historically notable instances of people getting lost and then either managing to discern their location or find help, or being rescued, or dying. George Shannon, the youngest adult member of the Lewis and Clark Expedition got lost on two occasions after being separated from the expedition. On August 26, 1804, he was sent to retrieve two pack horses; he was separated from the party for sixteen days and nearly starved, as he went without food for twelve days except for some grapes and rabbits. At first he thought he was behind the expedition, so he sped up thinking he could catch up. Then, getting hungry, he went downstream to look for a trading party he could stay with. Finally John Colter was sent to find him. The second time was on August 6, 1805, when the expedition was at the Three Forks. Shannon was dispatched up a fork the party had named Wisdom (the middle fork was named Jefferson and the placid fork, Philanthropy). He rejoined the party after three days by backtracking to the forks and following the trail of the others.

John Muir wrote in his journals of an occasion when a visiting artist named Billy Simms "went forth to sketch while I was among the glaciers, and got lost - was thirty-six hours without food". Mentally ailing Church of England mission priest Alexander Mackonochie died after getting lost on December 14, 1887, while walking in the Forest of Mamore, near Loch Leven, Scotland: the circumstances were later commemorated in a poem by William McGonagall. In September 2014, Soviet and Russian mathematician Alexey Chervonenkis got lost in Losiny Ostrov National Park; a later search operation found him dead near Mytishchi, a suburb of Moscow.

== In fiction and mythology ==
People are sometimes depicted in fiction and literature as getting lost, with substantial consequences. For example, due to "the physical structure of Rome, whose streets were notoriously labyrinthine", it has been observed that "getting lost in Rome was staple of travel narratives". The experience of getting lost is also a commonly reported theme of dreams.

In previous times, mythological explanations were given for getting lost and going astray. In the mythology of the British Isles, the culprit making someone get lost—being pixy-led, fairy-led or pouk-ledden as it is called—can be a fairy, Robin Goodfellow, Puck, Hob, a pixy or one of the gwyllion. In the mythology of Ireland, there are also places under fairy spells, leading to the same effect. They are called stray sod or foidin seachrain.

In German speaking Europe, someone getting lost could be attributed to be the fault of a variety of sprites (such as a Will-o'-the-wisp, a wood sprite, or the wild huntsman, the Mittagsweibchen ("noon-woman") or Rübezahl), of a witch or magic in general, or of mythical plants such as the Irrwurz. There are further places known called Irrfleck ("astray spot") or Irr-Revier ("astray district") where people go astray.

Getting lost in the bush has been identified as an enduring trope of Australian literature, often featuring lost children.
