= Terms of orientation =

Linguistic descriptors of spatial positioning

In linguistics, terms of orientation, terms of location, or spatial words are common descriptors used to indicate the spatial positioning of objects in three-dimensional space, including notions of top, bottom, front, back, left side, and right side as used in everyday language and interactions. Assigning these to objects then allows things to be described in relation to the object, above, below, in front of, behind, beside, and so forth.

== Basic concepts ==
Linguist Eve V. Clark notes that "many objects in the world around us have an inherent orientation that we usually take for granted". One of the first learning tasks that children are presented with is learning the difference between the top and bottom of things, and the front and back of things. Children tend to first learn to understand the concept of things having a top, as demonstrated by the tendency to initially identify the uppermost surface of a set of shelves as the place to add a new object, ignoring lower shelves. The orientation assigned to an object can differ depending on the vantage point and intent of the observer:

The reference frame [for an object] can be established in different ways. One way is to use the intrinsic orientation of the reference object. In this case, the regions that are above, below, in front of, behind, to the left of, and to the right of the reference objects are the regions which are adjacent to the top, bottom, front, back, left side, and right side, respectively. If the intrinsic orientation of the reference object is used to establish the reference frame, I am referring to the intrinsic use of the corresponding prepositions. Thus, in intrinsic use, two arguments are needed for a locative description: the primary object and the reference object.

For objects having a clearly discernible top and bottom, these aspects are determined by gravity, with the surface of the object tending to be closer to gravitational pull being the bottom, and the surface of the object tending to be farther from gravitational pull being the top. However, these distinction "do not distinguish between intrinsic tops and bottoms and absolute or environmental tops and bottoms", such as when an object has fallen over. For example, "a candle has an intrinsic top and bottom, because its canonical position is upright with certain defining features at each end. Even when a candle has fallen over, we can still talk about its top and bottom". Where an object does not inherently have such characteristics, the assignment of a top, bottom, and the like, is temporary and contingent. "If the reference object doesn't have an intrinsic orientation, or its intrinsic orientation isn't used for establishing the frame of reference, factors of the situational context determine the reference frame".

Terms describing the orientation of objects extend to the positional relationships of those objects relative to other objects, such as above, below, in front of, behind, and beside. The Cambridge Dictionary notes that "we usually use above, but not over, when there is no contact between the things referred to. Over or on top of have a more general meaning, and can be used when one thing touches or covers another". These universal terms are then easily translated to metaphorical concepts, such as being "on top of things", or of happiness being at the "top" of emotional states and sadness being at the "bottom".

== Specialized terms in specific fields ==
Various specialized language is used in specific fields to identify, for example, anatomical terms of location (such as "anterior and posterior", "dorsal and ventral", or "proximal and distal") or geometric terms of location (such as "circumferential", "tangential", "parallel", and "orthogonal"). In everyday life, however, people generally use simpler and more universal terms. Orientational terms are often relative to the viewer, such that a person facing multiple objects from one vantage point may see one object as being on the right side of another, while a person facing those objects from a different vantage point may see the relationship differently. For some uses, where it is necessary to avoid confusion from differences in viewpoint, separate terminology is used to describe the sides of things. For example, proper right and proper left are conceptual terms used to unambiguously convey relative direction when describing an image or other object. The "proper right" hand of a figure is the hand that would be regarded by that figure as its right hand.

In stagecraft, blocking is used to designate portions of the stage in an absolute sense, with stage right, stage left, upstage, and downstage being used to refer to the same direction relative to the stage, irrespective of the position of the viewer. Similarly, port and starboard are nautical terms for watercraft, aircraft and spacecraft, referring respectively to the left and right sides of the vessel, when aboard and facing the bow (front). Port and starboard unambiguously refer to the left and right side of the vessel, not the observer. That is, the port side of the vessel always refers to the same portion of the vessel's structure, and does not depend on which way the observer is facing. The port side is the side to the left of an observer aboard the vessel and facing the bow, towards the direction the vehicle is heading when underway. The starboard side is thus to the right of such an observer.

== Orientation in living things ==
The existence of anatomical terms of location is a reflection of the tendency of living things, more than naturally occurring nonliving objects, to have an orientation, described by the concept of body relative direction. Aristotle reasoned that concepts of "front" and "back" were only relevant to animals with the ability to perceive these relative positions. An analysis of Aristotle's writings on the subject summed it up as follows:

The reason why plants do not have their own front and back, Aristotle says, is that they lack sense-perception. Animals... have the dimension of depth, defined by the opposites front and back. Front and back are grounded in sense-perception, and since to be an animal is to have sense-perception, all animals have a front and a back.

Notably, Aristotle's assertion that "all animals have a front and a back" is not entirely accurate, with some uncharacteristic sea animals such as jellyfish, sea urchins, and starfish lacking these characteristics. With respect to jellyfish, Aristotle denied that they were animals at all. With respect to the small set of spherical animals, such as sea urchins, it has been noted that "since all radii are alike, a spherical animal can be divided into two similar pieces by a cut in any direction through the center. There is no front or rear, no top or bottom, no right or left sides, no ends—at least no permanent ones". It is further observed that an animal lacking a distinct front and back has "a disadvantage in directed locomotion", meaning that this form is "most typical of free-floating organisms that do not move under their own power".

== Illustrations ==
Objects with no set orientation markers

A ping pong ball, like the orange one pictured below, is a uniform sphere, and is therefore a typical example of an object that has no set top, bottom, front, back, or sides; it only has these characteristics in a contingent and temporary sense relative to the viewer. The ball, seen from above in the picture, could be described as having its "top" facing the viewer and its "bottom" obscured, or could be described as having its "top" and "bottom" as the uppermost and lowermost points visible to the viewer relative to the screen on which the object is being viewed.

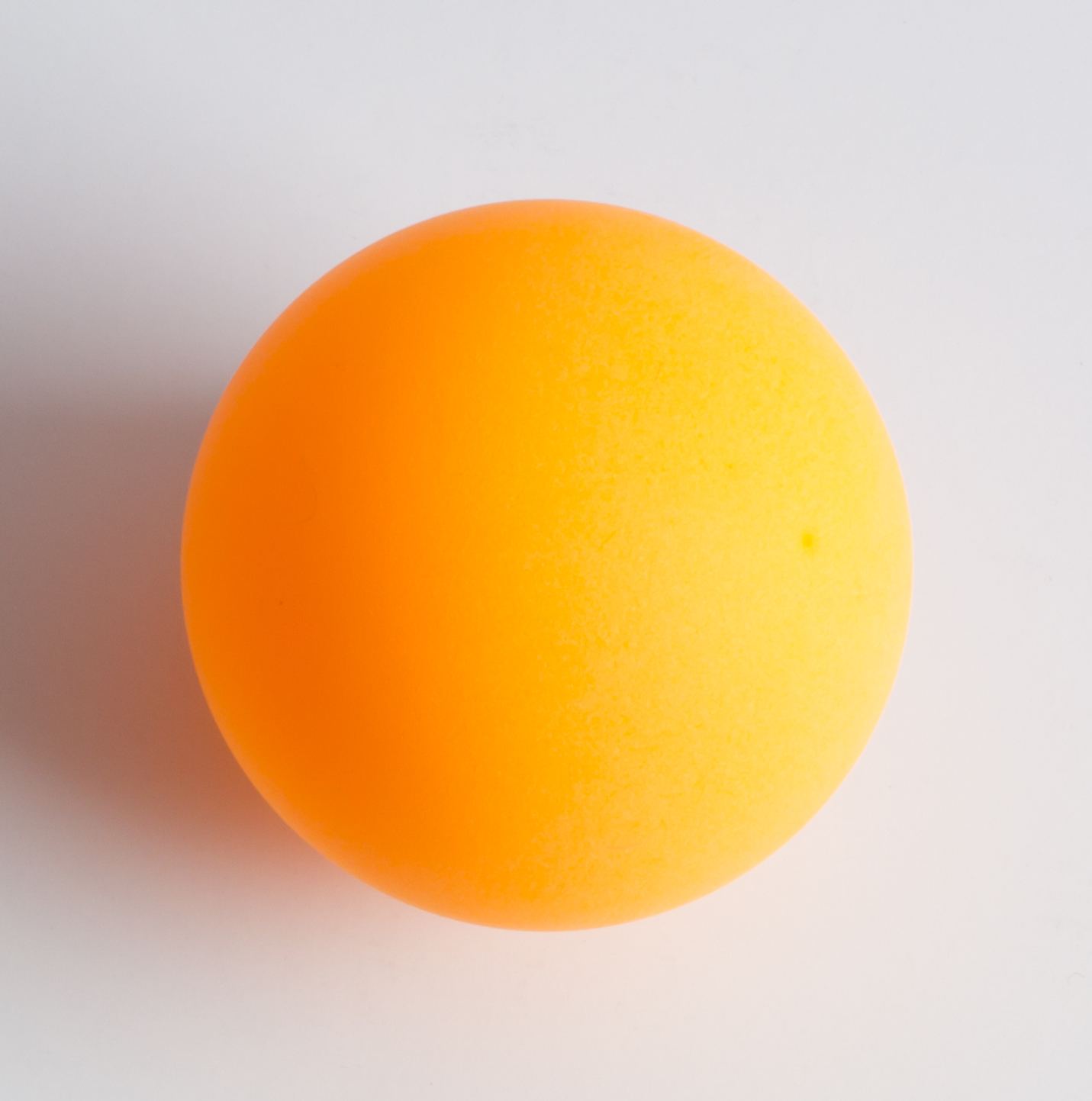
A ping pong ball is a typical example of an object that has no set top, bottom, front, back, or sides.

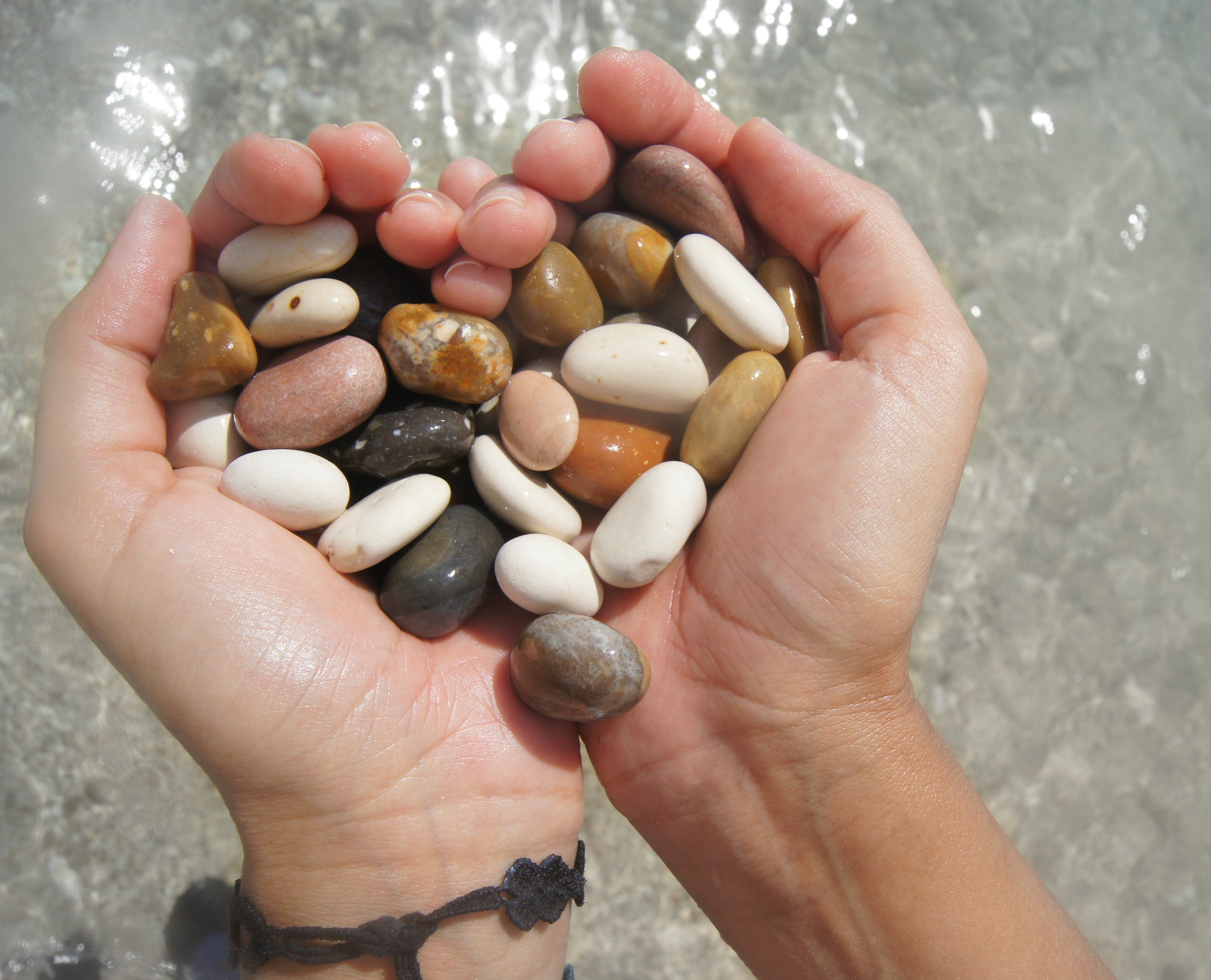
Pebbles found on the beach have irregular shapes, but no set top, bottom, front, back, or sides.

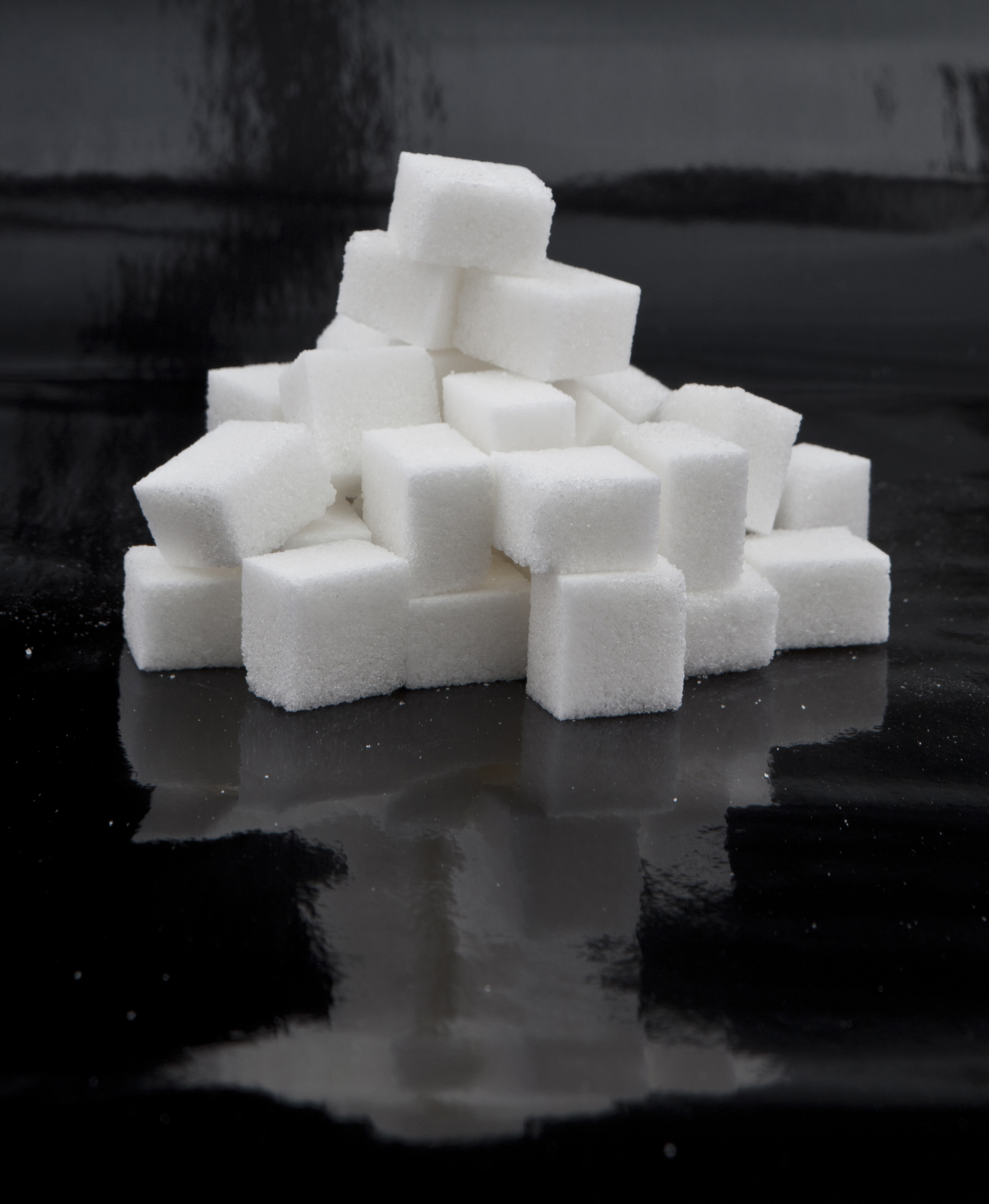
Sugar cubes also have no set top, bottom, front, back, or sides; they may be provisionally assigned these characteristics.

An asteroid like 162173 Ryugu has no set top, bottom, front, back, or sides, but its rotation makes it easy to provisionally assign a top and bottom.

Objects with some set orientation markers

In the images, both the cones of the Korean fir and the man-made traffic cone have a clearly discernible top and bottom, but are not clearly differentiated along other dimensions. A person viewing either kind of cone would be likely to provisionally identify the surface of the cone facing them as "the front", and would further identify an object between themselves and the cone as being "in front of" the fir cone. The mountain has a clearly discernible top and bottom, but the assignment of a front and back would be arbitrary.

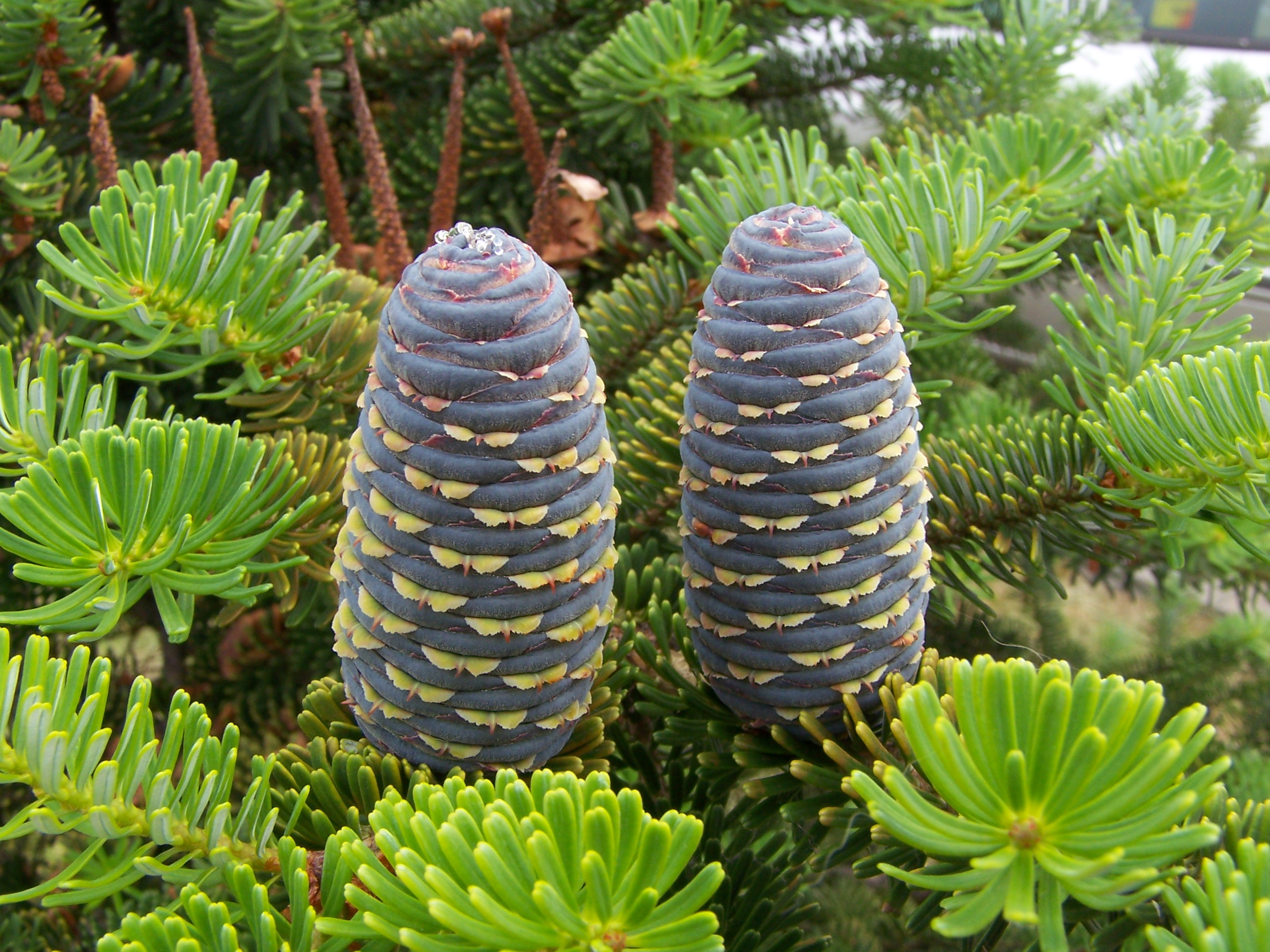
Cones of the Korean fir have a clearly discernible top and bottom, but are not clearly differentiated along other dimensions.

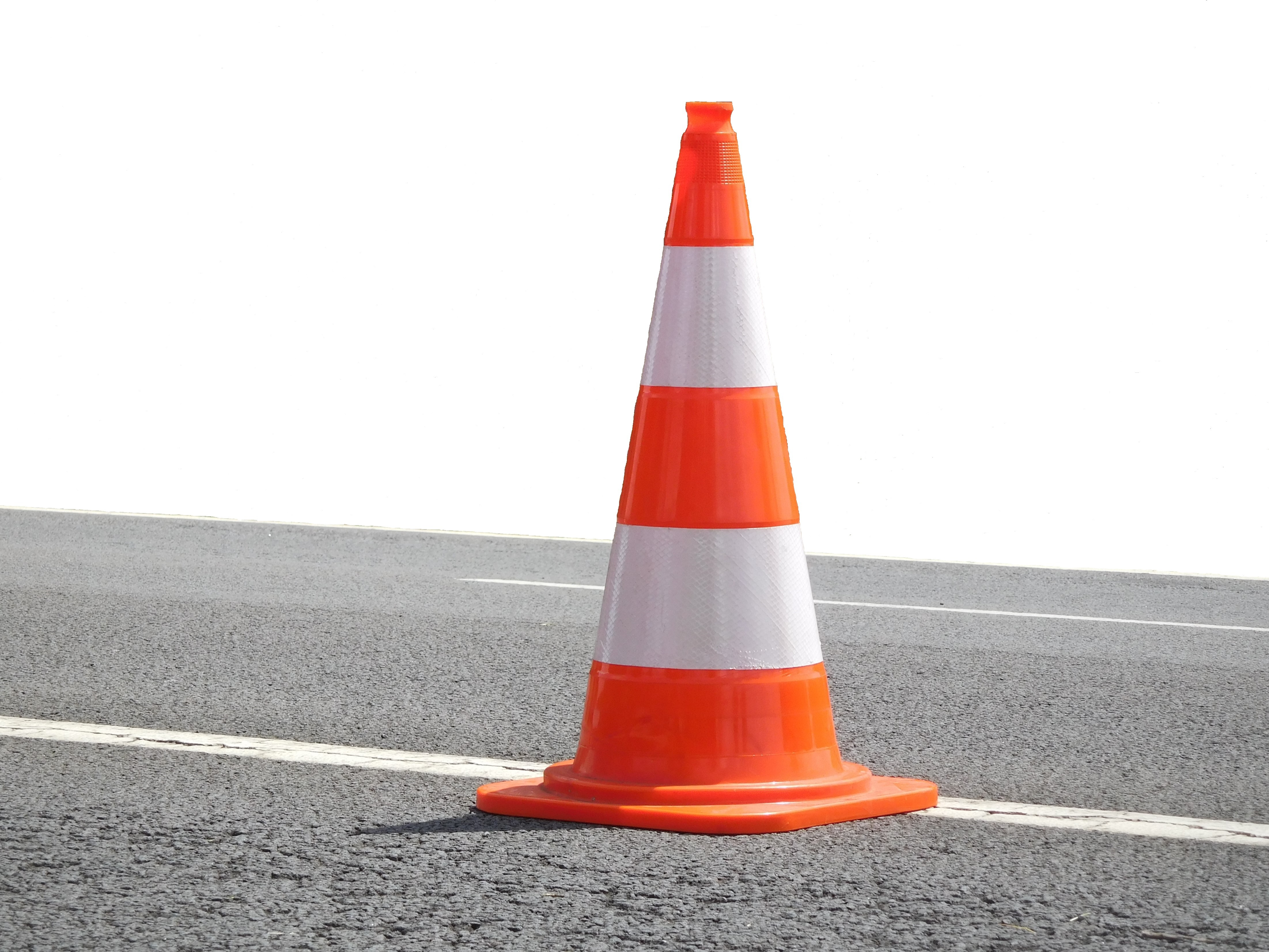
A traffic cone also has a clearly discernible top and bottom, but is not clearly differentiated along other dimensions.

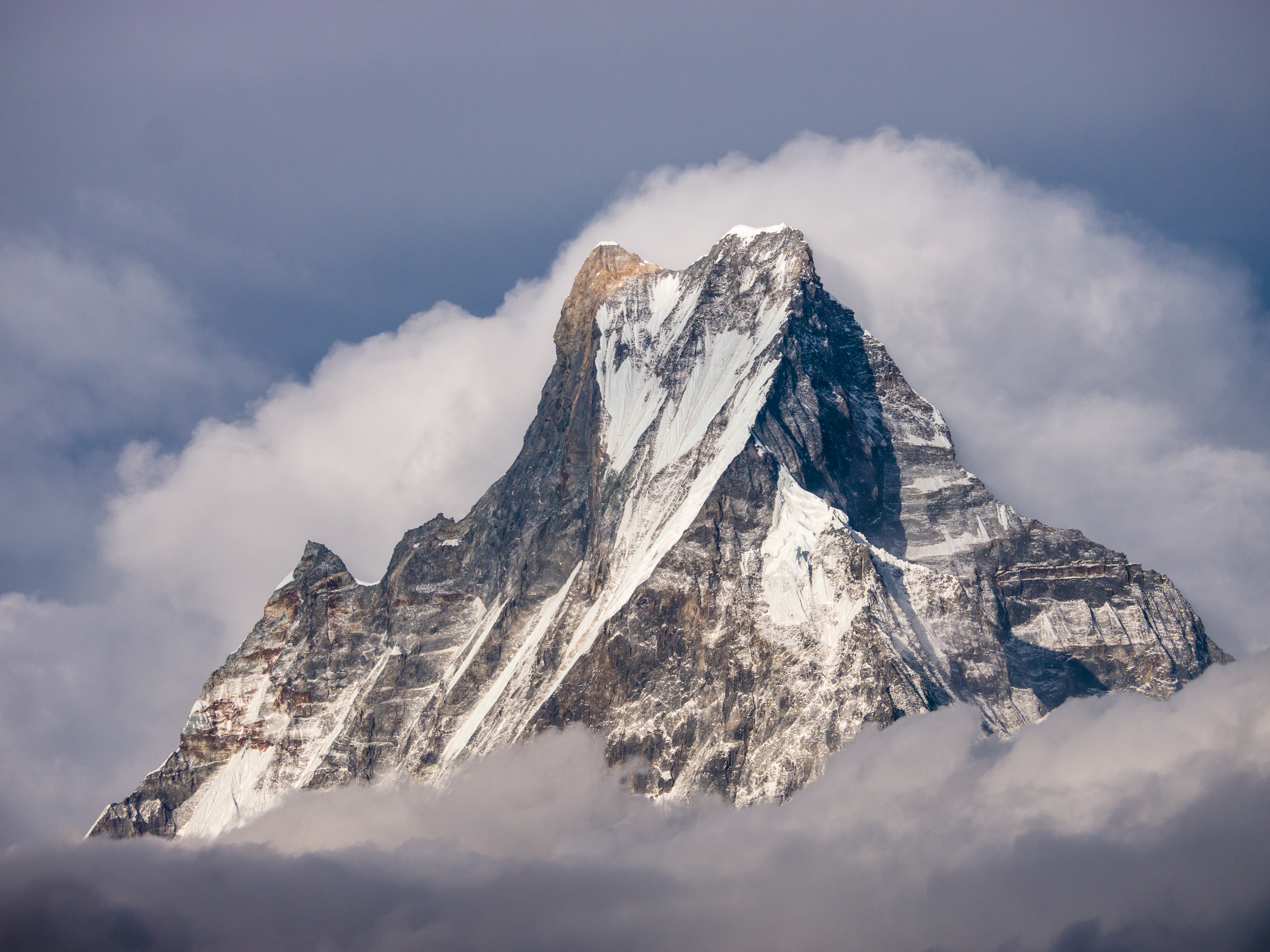
A mountain such as Machapuchare in Nepal has a clearly discernible top and bottom, but is not clearly differentiated along other dimensions, though people may designate a front, back, and sides.

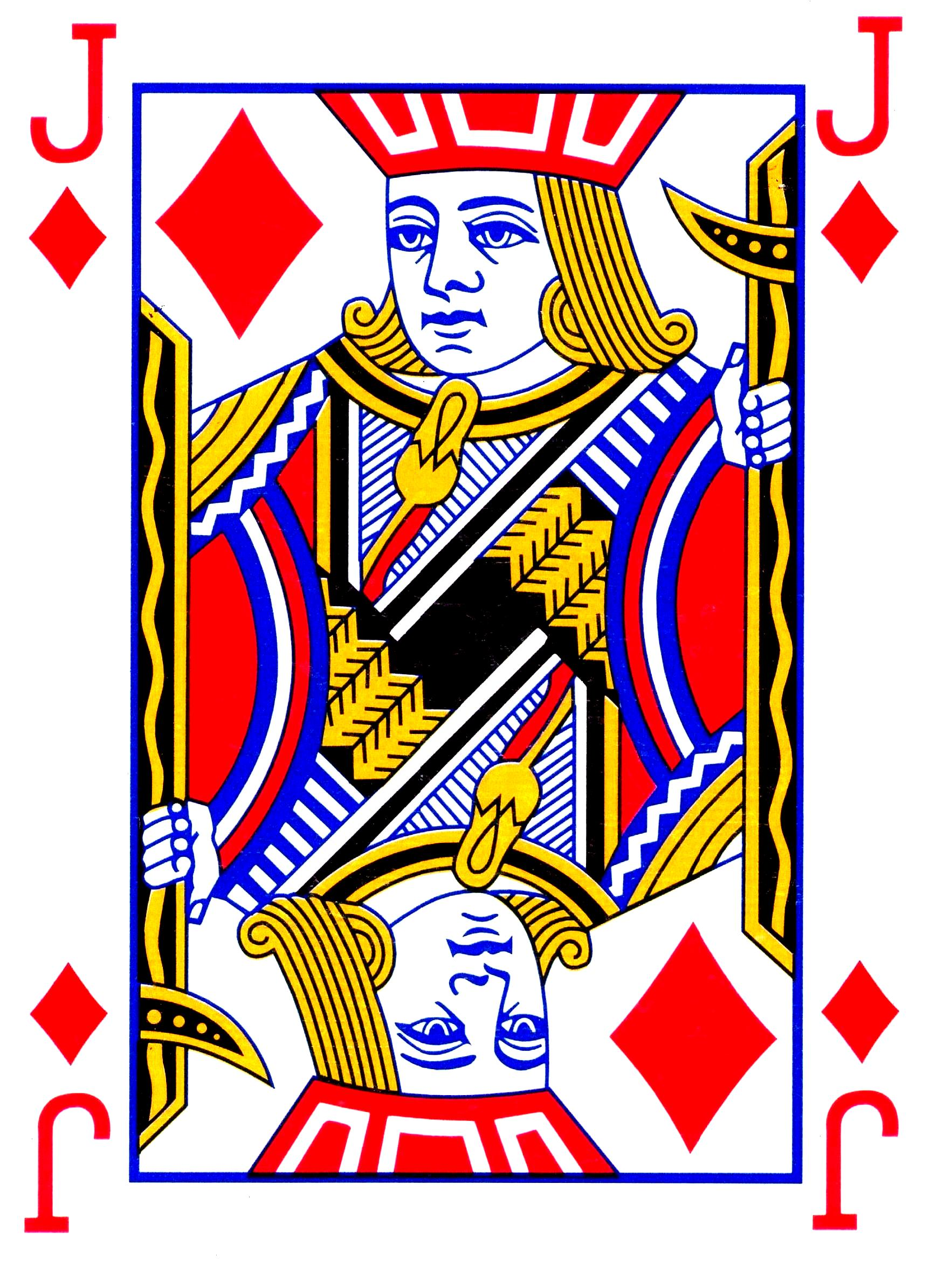
A playing card featuring the jack of diamonds has a clearly discernible front (shown) and back (not shown), but because the card is horizontally reversible, the top and bottom are provisional.

Objects with fully set orientation markers

In the third image below, a cat and a rat are sitting on top of a dog, which is lying on its side; all three animals have a clearly discernible top and bottom, and a clearly discernible front, back, and sides. Although the cat and rat are "on top of the dog", they are not sitting on the part that would be considered the top of the dog. Rather, they are sitting on the side of the dog, which serves as a provisional "top" surface, even though it continues to be understood to be the side of the animal.

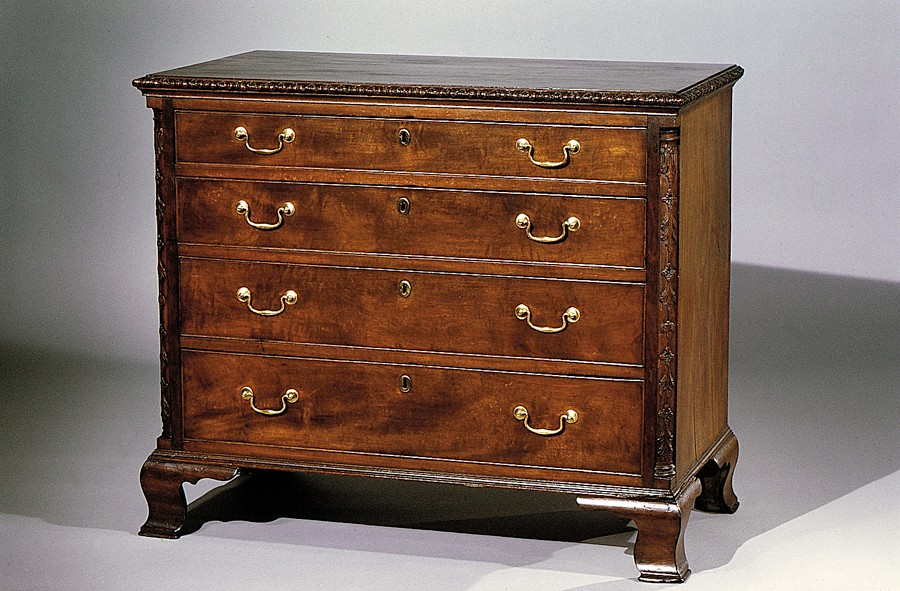
A chest of drawers has a clearly discernible top, bottom, front, back, and sides.

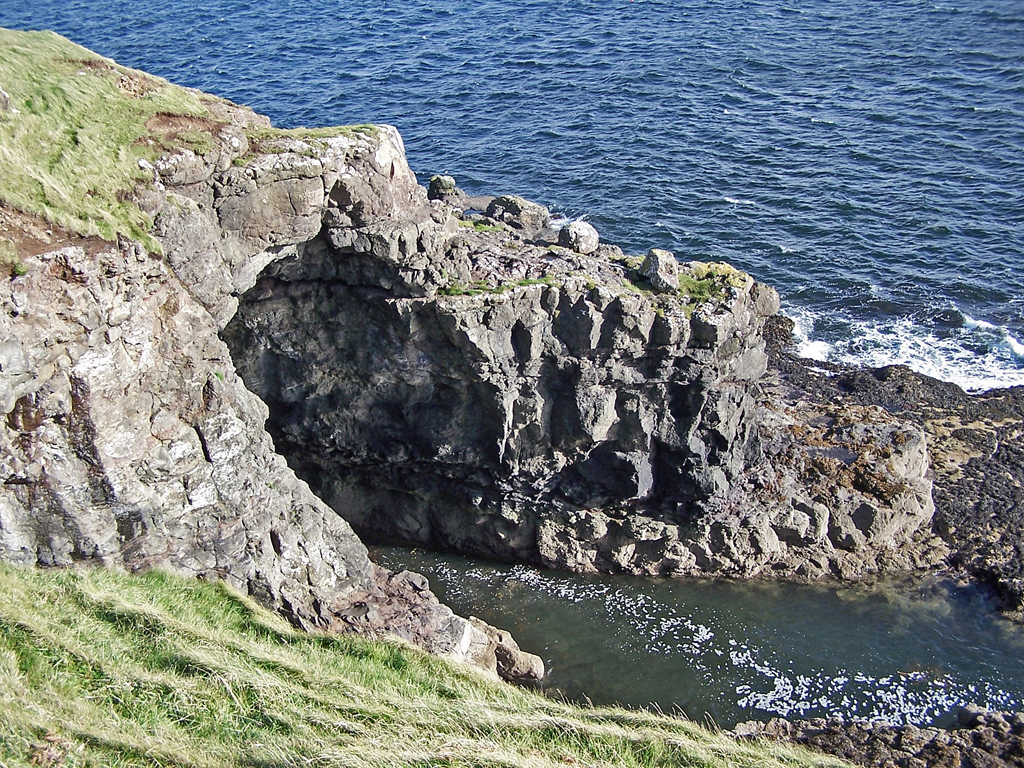
A single-entrance cave is a rare example of a natural formation with a clearly discernible top, bottom, front, back, and sides.

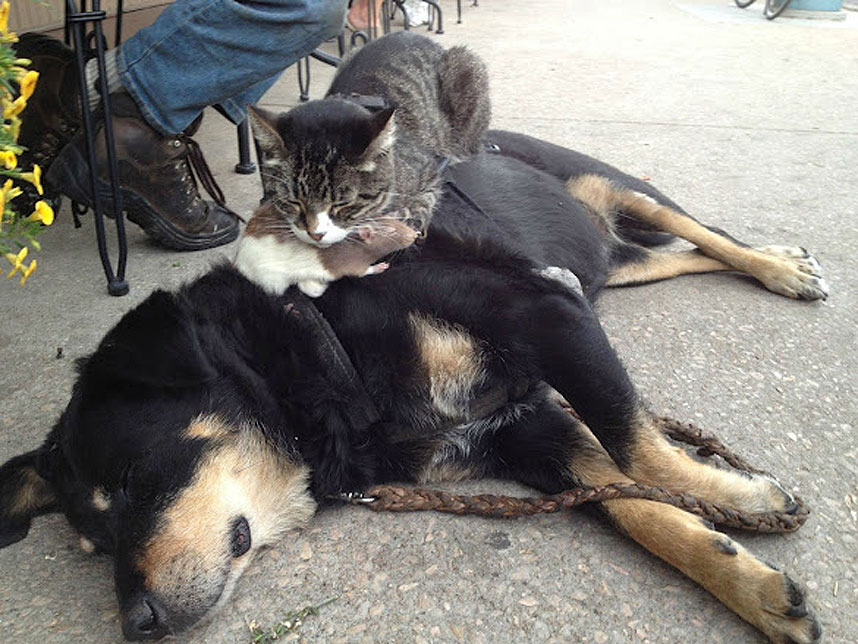
A cat and a rat sitting on top of a dog, which is lying on its side; each animal has a clearly discernible top, bottom, front, back, and sides.

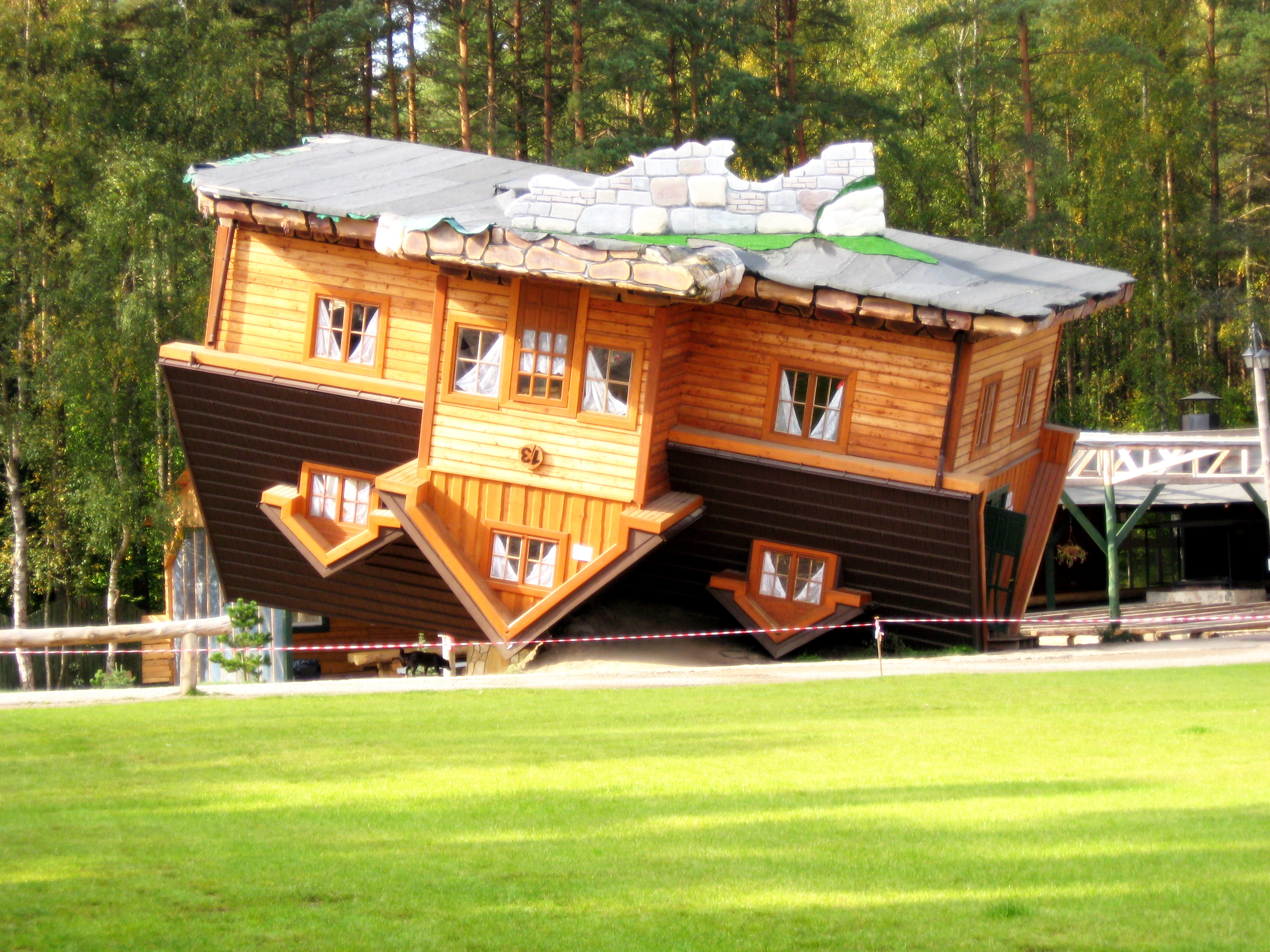
An 'upside-down house' in Szymbark, Pomeranian Voivodeship, is built to appear as though its bottom should be its top, and vice versa.

== See also ==
The dictionary definition of terms of orientation in English at Wiktionary

- Deixis
- Direction (geometry)
- Orientation (geometry)
- Orientability
- Position (geometry)#Relative position
- Sinistral and dextral
- Spatial reference system
- Vertical and horizontal
