= Irrwurz =

Plant in German, French and Celtic folklore

The Irrwurz (German: [ˈɪʁˌvʊʁts]), Irrwurzel (both "astray root"; pl. Irrwurzen or Irrwurzeln) or Irrkraut ("astray herb"; pl. Irrkräuter) is a legendary plant from German-speaking countries. In France it is known as herbe d'égarement ("herb of befuddlement"; pl. herbes d'égarement) among other names. A Celtic equivalent is the stray sod.

== The German Irrwurz ==
=== Botanical identity ===
The exact botanical identity of the Irrwurz varies. Sometimes it is identified with fern, though not in Tyrol where fern and Irrwurzel are said to be completely different plants. It is also said to be a special kind of tree root, namely one growing crosswise, one growing like St. Andrew's cross, or one belonging to a tree hit by lightning. Furthermore, it also gets identified or confused with another kind of plant with legendary features, the springwort (German Springwurzel).

=== Traits ===
The typical trait of the Irrwurz is that whoever steps on it goes astray and cannot find the way back. This plant, according to legend, is often found growing in forests, this being the reason people get lost in the woods. In Thuringia it is specified that a person only goes astray when stepping over Irrkraut (here: fern) without seeing it. In Tyrol, stepping on an Irrwurz immediately transfers you to a knacker's yard or into a swamp. Other, less common variants of the legend include getting lost after the seed of the Irrkraut, called Irrsame ("astray seed"), fell inside one's shoes, or not finding home after eating some Irrwurzel. In Switzerland, where this plant is known as Vexierchrut ("vexing herb") and identified with fern, one goes astray when carrying some of it in one's pocket. In Thuringia, where the Irrkraut fern is also known as Otterkraut or Atterkreutich (both "adder or viper herb"), it does not only lead people astray but also makes adders and vipers chase the person carrying the plant lest they throw it away. In Carinthia, getting lost after stepping on a Irrwurzen is attributed to a spirit or goblin standing in front of the right path and 'veneering' (i.e. hiding) it.

=== Remedies ===
There are some remedies known which are of help after getting lost. As such, the plant's magic can be staved off by taking off one's shoes or specifically switching them (right to left and left to right). Women might also take off their apron and tie it on again inside out. Both methods can be used not only to end the magic but also to prevent it from happening in the first place. In Tyrol, though, one has to go astray until another steps on the Irrwurzel.

=== Extinction ===
In the Ziller Valley in Tyrol, the last Irrwurz is said to have been burned in 1803 by an oil merchant who owned it. He did it after being told so by the cleric who came to him when he lay on his deathbed.

=== In the US ===
The German ancestors of the Pennsylvania Dutch brought the mythological idea of Irrkraut to the New World, calling it Verirrgraut ("going astray herb") in their dialect and identifying it with the rattlesnake plantain. When stepping on it at night, the victim is said to wander around aimlessly until morning comes. If stepping on it at day, the victim has to be shocked back to reason or else it won't stop wandering around aimlessly. Pennsylvania Dutch remedies against going astray are walking barefoot or switching shoes.

== The French herbe d'égarement ==
=== Name varieties ===
The herbe d'égarement is known under a plethora of names through all of France. It is called herbe qui égare ("herb which leads astray") in Normandy and in Meudon near Paris. In Besançon, its name is herbe à la recule ("herb to move backwards"). In the 18th century it was also called herbe de fourvoiement ("herb of going astray"). In Normandy it is further called egaire, in Saintogne herbe maudite ("herb of the damned soul") or herbe des tournes ("herb of turns"), in Anjou herbe à adirer ("herb to get lost"). In Upper Brittany and Lorraine it is known as herbe d'oubli ("herb of oblivion"). In Lower Brittany it is simply known as l'herbe, or ar Iotan in Breton (both "the herb").

=== Traits and remedies ===
The herbe d'égarement is a plant of unknown appearance which makes those who step on it lose their sense of direction or retrace their own steps. In Franche-Comté, it is also said that the plantain makes people go astray. In Burgundy, whoever stepps on the so-called tourmentine growing in the forest will walk the same path a hundred times over without being able to recognize it lest he finds the herb Paris whose seeds show where the path continues when they fall. The Breton ar Iotan is inhabited by a spirit which makes people lose their way. At night it spreads a phosphorescent light like that of certain glowworms. Its spell can be broken by turning one's clothing inside out, though. In Léon in Brittany, where it is known as herbe qui trouble la vue ("herb which troubles the sight"), one switches one's clogs as a remedy. Around Moncontour in Brittany, the herbe d'oubli further has the power to make people understand the language of animals but only as long as the one who has touched or taken it isn't aware that the plant in question is in fact the herbe d'oubli.

== Literature ==
- Marzell: Irrkraut, -wurz. In: Hanns Bächtold-Stäubli, Eduard Hoffmann-Krayer: Handwörterbuch des Deutschen Aberglaubens: Band 4 Hieb- und stichfest – Knistern. Berlin 1932. (reprint: Walter de Gruyter, Berlin/New York 2000, ISBN 978-3-11-016860-0)
- Marzell: Farn. In: Hanns Bächtold-Stäubli, Eduard Hoffmann-Krayer: Handwörterbuch des Deutschen Aberglaubens: Band 2 C.M.B – Frautragen. Berlin 1930. (reprint: Walter de Gruyter, Berlin/New York 2000, ISBN 978-3-11-016860-0)
- Ranke: irreführen. In: Hanns Bächtold-Stäubli, Eduard Hoffmann-Krayer: Handwörterbuch des Deutschen Aberglaubens: Band 4 Hieb- und stichfest – Knistern. Berlin 1932. (reprint: Walter de Gruyter, Berlin/New York 2000, ISBN 978-3-11-016860-0)
- Jacob Grimm: Deutsche Mythologie: Vollständige Ausgabe. Berlin 1844. (reprint: Marix-Verlag, Wiesbaden 2014, ISBN 978-3-86539-143-8)
- Leander Petzoldt: Kleines Lexikon der Dämonen und Elementargeister. Verlag C.H. Beck, Munich 1990, ISBN 978-3-406-34019-2.
- Ignaz Vinzenz Zingerle: Sagen, Maerchen und Gebraeuche aus Tirol. Innsbruck 1859. (reprint: Inktank publishing, Bremen 2018, ISBN 978-3-7477-8319-1)
- Audrey Burie Kirchner, Margaret R. Tassia: In Days Gone By: Folklore and Traditions of the Pennsylvania Dutch. Libraries Unlimited, Inc., Englewood 1996, ISBN 978-1-56308-381-5.
- Paul Sébillot: Croyances, mythes et légendes des pays de France. (originally Le Folk-lore de France). Paris, 1904–1907. (reprint: omnibus, Paris 2002, ISBN 978-2-258-05989-4)
