= Visuospatial dysgnosia =

Neurological disorder

Visuospatial dysgnosia is a loss of the sense of "whereness" in the relation of oneself to one's environment and in the relation of objects to each other. Visuospatial dysgnosia is often linked with topographical disorientation.

== Symptoms ==
The syndrome rarely presents itself the same way in every patient. Some symptoms that occur may be:

- Constructional apraxia: difficulty in constructing: drawing, copying, designs, copying 3D models
- Topographical disorientation: difficulty finding one's way in the environment
- Optic ataxia: deficit in visually-guided reaching
- Ocular motor apraxia: inability to direct gaze, a breakdown (failure) in starting (initiating) fast eye movements
- Dressing apraxia: difficulty in dressing usually related to inability to orient clothing spatially, and to a disrupted awareness of body parts and the position of the body and its parts in relation to themselves and objects in the environment
- Right-left confusion: difficulty in distinguishing the difference between the directions left and right

== Lesion areas ==
Studies have narrowed the area of the brain that, when damaged, causes visuospatial dysgnosia to the border of the occipito-temporoparietal region. Predominantly, lesions (damage, often from stroke) are found in the angular gyrus of the right hemisphere (in people with left-hemisphere language), and are usually unilateral, meaning in one hemisphere of the brain.

Bilateral lesions produce more complex dysgnosic signs such as object anomia (inability to name an object), prosopagnosia (inability to recognize faces), alexia (inability to read), dressing apraxia, and memory impairment in conjunction with visuospatial dysgnosia symptoms.

Visuospatial dysgnosia has many symptoms in common with Bálint's syndrome and can present simultaneously. Visuospatial dysgnosia, along with Balint's syndrome, has been connected with Alzheimer's disease as a possible early sign of the disease. Generally, the first symptom of Alzheimer's onset is loss of memory, but visual or visuospatial dysfunction is the presenting symptom in some cases and is common later in the disease course.

== Therapies ==
For patients with visuospatial dysgnosia, the information input may be strengthened by adding tactile, motor, and verbal perceptual inputs. This comes from the general occupational therapy practice of teaching clients with intellectual dysfunctions to use the most effective combinations of perceptual input modalities, which may enable them to complete a task.
