= Cardinal direction =

Directions of north, south, east and west

A compass rose showing four cardinal directions, the four intercardinal directions, and the eight secondary intercardinal directions, for a total of 16 directions.

The four cardinal directions or cardinal points are the four main compass directions: north (N), east (E), south (S), and west (W). The corresponding azimuths (clockwise horizontal angle from north) are 0°, 90°, 180°, and 270°.

The four ordinal directions or intercardinal directions are northeast (NE), southeast (SE), southwest (SW), and northwest (NW). The corresponding azimuths are 45°, 135°, 225°, and 315°.

The intermediate direction of every pair of neighboring cardinal and intercardinal directions is called a secondary intercardinal direction. These eight shortest points in the compass rose shown to the right are:

1. West-northwest (WNW)
2. North-northwest (NNW)
3. North-northeast (NNE)
4. East-northeast (ENE)
5. East-southeast (ESE)
6. South-southeast (SSE)
7. South-southwest (SSW)
8. West-southwest (WSW)

Points between the cardinal directions form the points of the compass. Arbitrary horizontal directions may be indicated by their azimuth angle value.

== Determination ==
In navigation and wayfinding, direction determination is a technique for determining a cardinal direction or compass point. The most direct method is using a compass (magnetic compass or gyrocompass), but indirect methods exist, based on the Sun path (unaided or by using a watch or sundial), the stars, and satellite navigation.

== Additional points ==
Azimuth	Cardinal direction	Intercardinal direction	Secondary intercardinal direction	Tertiary intercardinal direction
0°	North			
11¼°				NbE
22½°			NNE	
33¾°				NEbN
45°		NE		
56¼°				NEbE
67½°			ENE	
78¾°				EbN
90°	East			
101¼°				EbS
112½°			ESE	
123¾°				SEbE
135°		SE		
146¼°				SEbS
157½°			SSE	
168¾°				SbE
180°	South			
191¼°				SbW
202½°			SSW	
213¾°				SWbS
225°		SW		
236¼°				SWbW
247½°			WSW	
258¾°				WbS
270°	West			
281¼°				WbN
292½°			WNW	
303¾°				NWbW
315°		NW		
326¼°				NWbN
337½°			NNW	
348¾°				NbW

=== Azimuth ===
The directional names are routinely associated with azimuths, the angle of rotation (in degrees) in the unit circle over the horizontal plane. It is a necessary step for navigational calculations (derived from trigonometry) and for use with Global Positioning System (GPS) receivers. The four cardinal directions correspond to the following degrees of a compass:

- North (N): 0° = 360°
- East (E): 90°
- South (S): 180°
- West (W): 270°

=== Intercardinal directions ===
The intercardinal (intermediate, or, historically, ordinal) directions are the four intermediate compass directions located halfway between each pair of cardinal directions.

- Northeast (NE), 45°, halfway between north and east, is the opposite of southwest.
- Southeast (SE), 135°, halfway between south and east, is the opposite of northwest.
- Southwest (SW), 225°, halfway between south and west, is the opposite of northeast.
- Northwest (NW), 315°, halfway between north and west, is the opposite of southeast.

=== Subintercardinal directions ===
The eight above listed directional names have been further compounded known as secondary intercardinal directions, resulting in a total of 16 named points evenly spaced around the compass. But there exist even tertiary intercardinal directions, resulting in a total of 32 named points evenly spaced around the compass: north (N), north by east (NbE), north-northeast (NNE), northeast by north (NEbN), northeast (NE), northeast by east (NEbE), east-northeast (ENE), east by north (EbN), east (E), etc.

== Beyond geography ==
Cardinal directions or cardinal points may sometimes be extended to include vertical position (elevation, altitude, depth): north and south, east and west, up and down; or mathematically the six directions of the x-, y-, and z-axes in three-dimensional Cartesian coordinates. Topographic maps include elevation, typically via contour lines. Alternatively, elevation angle may be combined with cardinal direction (or, more generally, arbitrary azimuth angle) to form a local spherical coordinate system.

=== In astronomy ===
In astronomy, the cardinal points of an astronomical star as seen in the sky are four points defined by the directions toward which the celestial poles lie relative to the center of the disk of the object in the sky. A line (a great circle on the celestial sphere) from the center of the disk to the North celestial pole will intersect the edge of the body (the "limb") at the North point. The North point will then be the point on the limb that is closest to the North celestial pole. Similarly, a line from the center to the South celestial pole will define the South point by its intersection with the limb. The points at right angles to the North and South points are the East and West points. Going around the disk clockwise from the North point, one encounters in order the West point, the South point, and then the East point. This is opposite to the order on a terrestrial map because one is looking up instead of down.

Similarly, when describing the location of one astronomical object relative to another, "north" means closer to the North celestial pole, "east" means at a higher right ascension, "south" means closer to the South celestial pole, and "west" means at a lower right ascension. If one is looking at two stars that are below the North Star, for example, the one that is "east" will actually be further to the left.

== Germanic origin of names ==
During the Migration Period, the Germanic names for the cardinal directions entered the Romance languages, where they replaced the Latin names borealis (or septentrionalis) with north, australis (or meridionalis) with south, occidentalis with west and orientalis with east. It is possible that some northern people used the Germanic names for the intermediate directions. Medieval Scandinavian orientation would thus have involved a 45 degree rotation of cardinal directions.

- north (Proto-Germanic *norþ-) from the proto-Indo-European *nórto-s 'submerged' from the root *ner- 'left, below, to the left of the rising sun' whence comes the Ancient Greek name Nereus.
- east (*aus-t-) from the word for dawn. The proto-Indo-European form is *austo-s from the root *aues- 'shine (red)'. See Ēostre.
- south (*sunþ-), derived from proto-Indo-European *sú-n-to-s from the root *seu- 'seethe, boil'. Cognate with this root is the word Sun, thus "the region of the Sun".
- west (*wes-t-) from a word for "evening". The proto-Indo-European form is *uestos from the root *ues- 'shine (red)', itself a form of *aues-. Cognate with the root are the Latin words vesper and vesta and the Ancient Greek Hestia, Hesperus and Hesperides.

== Cultural variations ==
In many regions of the world, prevalent winds change direction seasonally, and consequently many cultures associate specific named winds with cardinal and intercardinal directions. For example, classical Greek culture characterized these winds as Anemoi.

In pre-modern Europe more generally, between eight and 32 points of the compass – cardinal and intercardinal directions – were given names. These often corresponded to the directional winds of the Mediterranean Sea (for example, southeast was linked to the Sirocco, a wind from the Sahara).

Particular colors are associated in some traditions with the cardinal points. These are typically "natural colors" of human perception rather than optical primary colors.

Many cultures, especially in Asia, include the center as a fifth cardinal point.

=== Northern Eurasia ===
Northern Eurasia	N	E	S	W	C	Source
Slavic					—	
China						
Ainu						
Turkic						
Kalmyks					—	
Tibet						

Central Asian, Eastern European and North East Asian cultures frequently have traditions associating colors with four or five cardinal points.

Systems with five cardinal points (four directions and the center) include those from pre-modern China, as well as traditional Turkic, Tibetan and Ainu cultures. In Chinese tradition, the five cardinal point system is related to I Ching, the Wu Xing and the five naked-eye planets. In traditional Chinese astrology, the zodiacal belt is divided into the four constellation groups corresponding to the directions.

Each direction is often identified with a color, and (at least in China) with a mythological creature of that color. Geographical or ethnic terms may contain the name of the color instead of the name of the corresponding direction.

==== Examples ====
East: Green/Blue (青 "qīng" corresponds to both green and blue); Spring; Wood

Qingdao (Tsingtao): "Green Island", a city on the east coast of China
Green Ukraine

South: Red; Summer; Fire

Red River (Asia): south of China
Red Ruthenia
Red Jews: a semi-mythological group of Jews
Red Croatia
Red Sea

West: White; Autumn; Metal

White Sheep Turkmen
Akdeniz, meaning 'White Sea': Mediterranean Sea in Turkish
Balts, Baltic words containing the stem balt- ("white")
Belarus, meaning 'White Russia'
White Ruthenia
White Serbia
White Croatia

North: Black; Winter; Water

Heilongjiang: "Black Dragon River" province in Northeast China, also the Amur River
Kara-Khitan Khanate: "Black Khitans" who originated in Northern China
Karadeniz, literally meaning 'Black Sea': Black Sea in Turkish
Black Hungarians
Black Ruthenia

Center: Yellow; Earth

Huangshan: "Yellow Mountain" in central China
Huang He: "Yellow River" in central China
Golden Horde: "Central Army" of the Mongols

=== Arabic world ===
Countries where Arabic is used refer to the cardinal directions as الشَّمَال aš-šamāl (N), الشَّرْق aš-šarq (E), الْجَنُوب al-janūb (S), and الْغَرْب al-ḡarb (W). Additionally, الْوَسَط al-wasaṭ is used for the center. All five are used for geographic subdivision names (wilayahs, states, regions, governorates, provinces, districts or even towns), and some are the origin of some Southern Iberian place names (such as Algarve, Portugal and Axarquía, Spain).

=== North America ===
North America	E	N	W	S	C	Source
Anishinaabe					—	
Apache					—	
Aztecs					—	
Báxoje					—	
Cherokee						
Cheyenne					—	
Lakota					—	
Maya						
Navajo					—	
Puebloans					—	
Purépecha						

In Mesoamerica and North America, a number of traditional indigenous cosmologies include four cardinal directions and a center. Some may also include "above" and "below" as directions, and therefore focus on a cosmology of seven directions. For example, among the Hopi of the Southwestern United States, the four named cardinal directions are not North, South, East and West but are the four directions associated with the places of sunrise and sunset at the winter and summer solstices. Each direction may be associated with a color, which can vary widely between nations, but which is usually one of the basic colors found in nature and natural pigments, such as black, red, white, and yellow, with occasional appearances of blue, green, or other hues. There can be great variety in color symbolism, even among cultures that are close neighbors geographically.

=== India ===
Ten Hindu deities, known as the "Dikpālas", have been recognized in classical Indian scriptures, symbolizing the four cardinal and four intercardinal directions with the additional directions of up and down. Each of the ten directions has its own name in Sanskrit.

=== Indigenous Australia ===
Some Indigenous Australians have cardinal directions deeply embedded in their culture. For example, the Warlpiri people have a cultural philosophy deeply connected to the four cardinal directions and the Guugu Yimithirr people use cardinal directions rather than relative direction even when indicating the position of an object close to their body. (For more information, see: Cultures without relative directions.)

The precise direction of the cardinal points appears to be important in Aboriginal stone arrangements.

Many aboriginal languages contain words for the usual four cardinal directions, but some contain words for 5 or even 6 cardinal directions.

== Unique (non-compound) names of intercardinal directions ==
Cardinal and non-compound intercardinal directions in Estonian and Finnish. Notice the intermixed "south" and "southwest". Further intermixing between directions south and northwest occur in other Finnic languages.

In some languages, such as Estonian, Finnish and Breton, the intercardinal directions have names that are not compounds of the names of the cardinal directions (as, for instance, northeast is compounded from north and east). In Estonian, those are kirre (northeast), kagu (southeast), edel (southwest), and loe (northwest), in Finnish koillinen (northeast), kaakko (southeast), lounas (southwest), and luode (northwest). In Japanese, there is the interesting situation that native Japanese words (yamato kotoba, kun readings of kanji) are used for the cardinal directions (such as minami for 南, south), but borrowed Chinese words (on readings of kanji) are used for intercardinal directions (such as tō-nan for 東南, southeast, lit. "east-south"). In the Malay language, adding laut (sea) to either east (timur) or west (barat) results in northeast or northwest, respectively, whereas adding daya to west (giving barat daya) results in southwest. Southeast has a special word: tenggara.

Sanskrit and other Indian languages that borrow from it use the names of the gods associated with each direction: east (Indra), southeast (Agni), south (Yama/Dharma), southwest (Nirrti), west (Varuna), northwest (Vayu), north (Kubera/Heaven) and northeast (Ishana/Shiva). North is associated with the Himalayas and heaven while the south is associated with the underworld or land of the fathers (Pitr loka). The directions are named by adding "disha" to the names of each god or entity: e.g. Indradisha (direction of Indra) or Pitrdisha (direction of the forefathers i.e. south).

The cardinal directions of the Hopi language are related to the places of sunrise and sunset at the solstices, and correspond approximately to the European intercardinal directions.

== Non-compass directional systems ==
Use of the compass directions is common and deeply embedded in European and Chinese culture (see south-pointing chariot). Some other cultures make greater use of other referents, such as toward the sea or toward the mountains (Hawaii, Bali), or upstream and downstream (most notably in ancient Egypt, also in the Yurok and Karuk languages). Lengo (Guadalcanal, Solomon Islands) has four non-compass directions: landward, seaward, upcoast, and downcoast.

Some languages lack words for body-relative directions such as left/right, and use geographical directions instead.

== See also ==
- Classical compass winds – an early source of cardinal directions
- Cultural synesthesia
- Direction (geometry)
- Elevation – the mapping information ignored by the cardinal point system
- Geocaching – an international hobby
- Geographic Information System (GIS)
- Latitude and Longitude
- List of cartographers – famous map makers through history
- List of international common standards
- Magnetic deviation – explanation of the slight misalignment of a compass with the Earth's north and south poles
- Orienteering – an international hobby/sport that depends on knowledge of cardinal directions and how to locate them
- Polar coordinate system
- Uses of trigonometry
