= Left–right confusion =

Inability to differentiate left and right directions

Left–right confusion (LRC) is the inability to accurately differentiate between left and right directions. Conversely, left–right discrimination (LRD) refers to a person's ability to differentiate between left and right. LRC is reported by approximately 15% of the population according to the 2020 research by Van der Ham and her colleagues. People who have LRC can typically perform daily navigational tasks, such as driving according to road signs or following a map, but may have difficulty performing actions that require a precise understanding of directional commands, such as ballroom dancing.

== Prevalence ==
Data regarding LRC prevalence is primarily based on behavioral studies, self-assessments, and surveys. Gormley and Brydges found that in a group of 800 adults, 17% of women and 9% of men reported difficulty differentiating between left and right. Such studies suggest that women are more prone to LRC than men, with women reporting higher rates of LRC in both accuracy and speed of response.

== Sex differences ==
The Bergen Left–Right Discrimination (BLRD) test is designed to measure individual performance in LRD accuracy. However, this test has been criticized for incorporating tasks that require the use of additional strategies, such as mental rotation (MR). Because men have been shown to consistently outperform women in MR tasks, tests involving the use of this particular strategy may present alternative cognitive demands and lead to inaccurate assessment of LRD performance. An extended version of the BLRD test was designed to allow for differential evaluation of LRD and MR abilities, in which subtests were created with either high or low demands on mental rotation. Results from these studies did not find sex differences in LRD performance when mental rotation demands were low. Another study found that sex differences in left–right discrimination existed in terms of self-reported difficulty, but not in actual tested ability.

Alternatively, studies focused on LRD as a phenomenon distinct from MR concluded that there are sex differences present in LRD. Scientists controlled for MR demands, potential menstrual cycle effects, and other hormone fluctuations, and determined that the neurocognitive mechanisms that support LRD are different for men and women. This research revealed that inferior parietal and right angular gyrus activation were correlated with LRD performance in both men and women. Women also demonstrated increased prefrontal activation, but did not exhibit greater bilateral activation. Additionally, no correlation was found between LRD accuracy and brain activation, or between brain activation and reaction time, for either sex. These results indicate that there are sex differences in the neurocognitive mechanisms underlying LRD performance; however, findings did not suggest that women are more prone to LRC than men.

== Acquisition and comparison ==
Humans are constantly making decisions about spatial relations; however, some spatial relations, such as left–right, are commonly confused, while other spatial relations, such as up–down, above–below, and front–back, are seldom, if ever, mistaken. The ability to categorize and compartmentalize space is an essential tool for navigating this 3D world; an ability shown to develop in early infancy. Infant ability to visually match above–below and left–right relations appears to diminish in early toddlerhood, as language acquisition may complicate verbal labeling. Children learn to verbally discriminate between above–below relations around the age of three, and learn left–right linguistic labels between the ages of six and seven; however, these classifications may only exist in the linguistic context. In other words, children may learn the terms for left and right without having developed a cognitive representation to allow for the accurate application of such spatial distinctions.

Research seeks to explain the neural activity associated with left–right discrimination, attempting to identify differences in the encoding, consolidation, and retrieval of left–right versus above–below relations. One study found that neural activity patterns for left–right and above–below distinctions are represented differently in the brain, leading to the theory that these spatial judgements are supported by separate cognitive mechanisms. Experiments used magnetoencephalography (MEG) to record neural activity during a computerized nonverbal task, examining left–right and above–below differences in encoding and working memory. Results showed differences in neural activity patterns in the right cerebellum, right superior temporal gyrus, and left temporoparietal junction during the encoding phase, and indicated differential neural activity in the inferior parietal, right superior temporal, and right cerebellum regions in the working memory tests.

== The role of distraction ==
Although some individuals may struggle with LRD more than others, discriminating between left and right in the face of distraction has been shown to impair even the most proficient individual's ability to accurately differentiate between the two. This issue is of particular importance to medical students, clinicians and health care professionals, where distraction in the workplace and LRD inaccuracy can lead to severe consequences, including laterality errors and wrong-side surgeries. Laterality errors in the field of aviation may also lead to equally devastating results, for example, causing a major airline crash.

Distraction has a significant impact on LRD accuracy, and the type of distraction can alter the magnitude of these effects. For example, cognitive distraction, which occurs when an individual is not directly focused on the task at hand, has a more profound effect on LRD performance than auditory distraction, such as the presence of continuous ambient noise. Additionally, in the field of health care, it has been noted that mental rotation is often involved in making left–right distinctions, such as when a medical practitioner is facing their patient and must adjust for the opposite left–right relations.
