= Stray sod =

Mythical Object

In contemporary fantasy literature, a stray sod is a clump of grass enchanted by faeries. If a person steps on one, they will become disoriented and lost, even in familiar surroundings. Wearing an item of clothing inside-out breaks the enchantment, allowing the person to find their way again. The concept and phrase appear to originate in ancient Celtic mythology, specifically Irish folklore.In more modern Christianized interpretations, the source of the enchantment may not be fairies.

In other writing and in speech, the phrase "stepped on a stray sod" can be used metaphorically to denote sudden, unexpected or inexplicable disorientation.

Stray sods appear in the series The Spiderwick Chronicles, disorienting travelers. The companion guide to the series notes that in order to reverse the effects, one must either have bread in his or her pocket or turn their clothes inside out.

== See also ==
- Fairy ring
- Irrwurz
