= Direction determination =

Ways to determine a direction

In navigation and wayfinding, direction determination is a technique for determining a cardinal direction or compass point. The most direct method is using a compass (magnetic compass or gyrocompass), but indirect methods exist, based on the Sun path (unaided or by using a watch or sundial), the stars, and satellite navigation.

== Compass ==
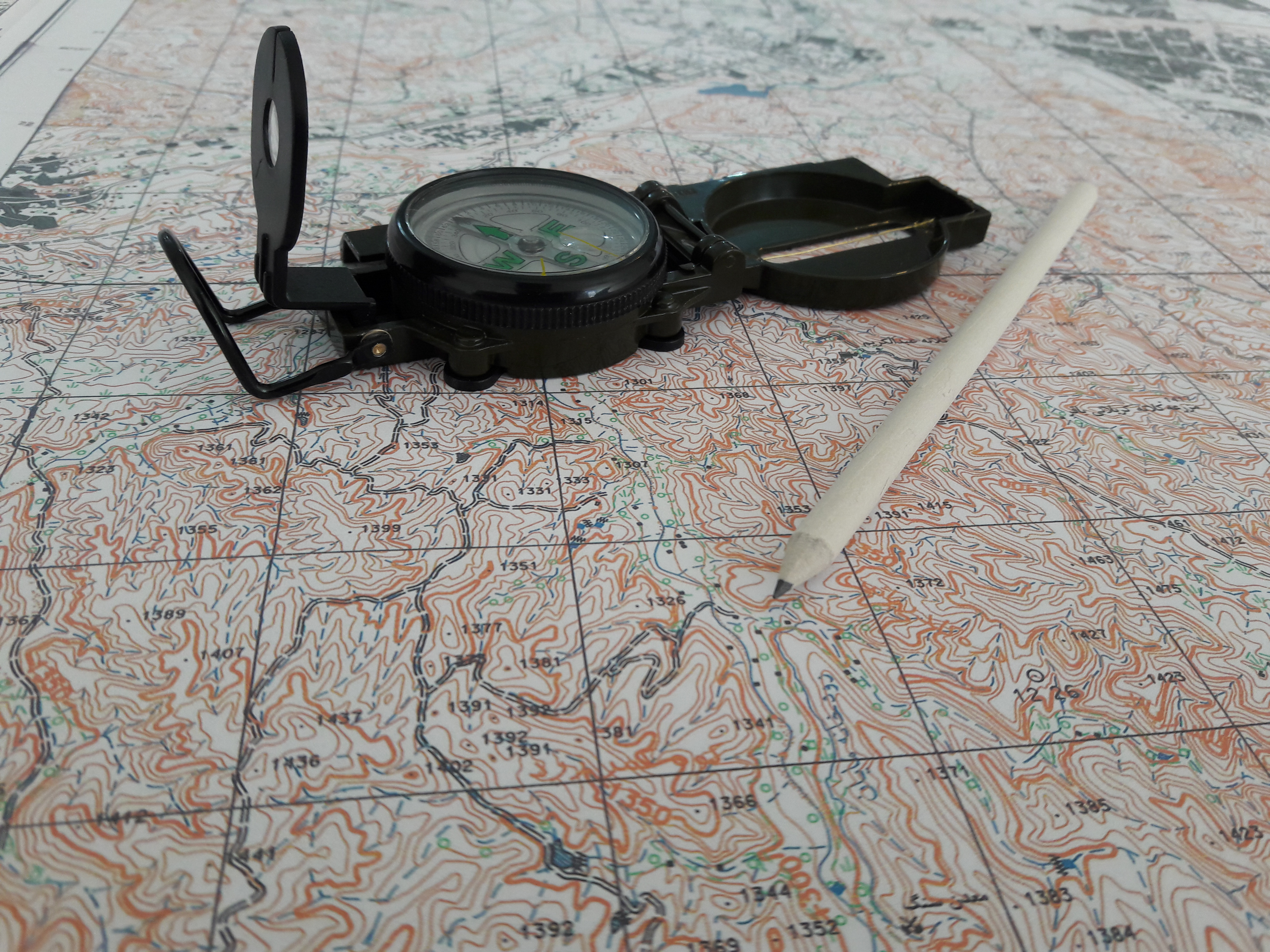
A compass and map

The Earth has a magnetic field which is approximately aligned with its axis of rotation. A magnetic compass is a device that uses this field to determine the cardinal directions. Magnetic compasses are widely used, but only moderately accurate. The north pole of the magnetic needle points toward the geographic north pole of the earth and vice versa. This is because the geographic north pole of the earth lies very close to the magnetic south pole of the earth. This south magnetic pole of the earth located at an angle of 17 degrees to the geographic north pole attracts the north pole of the magnetic needle and vice versa.

=== Gyrocompass ===
At the very end of the 19th century, in response to the development of battleships with large traversable guns that affected magnetic compasses, and possibly to avoid the need to wait for fair weather at night to precisely verify one's alignment with true north, the gyrocompass was developed for shipboard use. Since it finds true, rather than magnetic, north, it is immune to interference by local or shipboard magnetic fields. Its major disadvantage is that it depends on technology that many individuals might find too expensive to justify outside the context of a large commercial or military operation. It also requires a continuous power supply for its motors, and that it can be allowed to sit in one location for a period of time while it properly aligns itself.

== Based on the Sun ==
The position of the Sun in the sky can be used for orientation if the general time of day is known. In the morning the Sun rises roughly in the east (due east only on the equinoxes) and tracks southward (in the Northern Hemisphere) or northward (in the Southern Hemisphere). In the evening, the Sun sets in the west, again roughly and only due west exactly on the equinoxes. In the middle of the day, it is to the south for viewers in the Northern Hemisphere, who live north of the Tropic of Cancer, and the north for those in the Southern Hemisphere, who live south of the Tropic of Capricorn. This method does not work very well when closer to the equator (i.e. between the Tropic of Cancer and the Tropic of Capricorn) since, in the Northern Hemisphere, the Sun may be directly overhead or even to the north in summer. Conversely, at low latitudes in the Southern Hemisphere the Sun may be to the south of the observer in summer. In these locations, first determine whether the Sun is moving from east to west through north or south by watching its movements—left to right means it is going through south while the right to left means it is going through north; or observers can watch the Sun's shadows. If they move clockwise, the Sun will be in the south at midday, and if they move anticlockwise, then the Sun will be in the north at midday. The Sun is seen to rise from the east and set in the West.

Because of the Earth's axial tilt, no matter what the location of the viewer, there are only two days each year when the Sun rises precisely due east. These days are the equinoxes. On all other days, depending on the time of year, the Sun is seen to rise either north or south of true east (and sets north or south of true west). For all locations, the Sun is seen to rise north of east (and set north of west) from the Northward equinox to the Southward equinox, and rise south of east (and set south of west) from the Southward equinox to the Northward equinox

=== Watch dial ===
A method to identify north and south directions using the sun and a 12-hour analogue clock or watch set to the local time, 10:10 a.m. in this example.

There is a traditional method by which an analogue watch can be used to locate north and south. The Sun appears to move in the sky over a 24-hour period while the hour hand of a 12-hour clock dial takes twelve hours to complete one rotation. In the Northern Hemisphere, if the watch is rotated so that the hour hand points toward the Sun, the point halfway between the hour hand and 12 o'clock will indicate south. For this method to work in the Southern Hemisphere, the 12 is pointed toward the Sun and the point halfway between the hour hand and 12 o'clock will indicate north. During daylight saving time, the same method can be employed using 1 o'clock instead of 12. The difference between local time and zone time, the equation of time, and (near the tropics) the non-uniform change of the Sun's azimuth at different times of day limit the accuracy of this method.

=== Sundial ===
A portable sundial can be used as a more accurate instrument than a watch for determining the cardinal directions. Because the design of a sundial takes account of the latitude of the observer, it can be used at any latitude. See: Sundial#Using a sundial as a compass.

== Other stars ==
Astronomy provides a method for finding direction at night. All the stars appear to lie on the imaginary celestial sphere. Because of the rotation of the Earth, the diurnal motion makes stars appear to rotate around an axis passing through the North and South poles of the Earth. This axis intersects the Celestial Sphere at the North and South Celestial poles, which appear to the observer to lie directly above due North and South respectively on the horizon.

In either hemisphere, observations of the night sky show that the visible stars appear to be moving in circular paths, caused by the rotation of the Earth. This is best seen in a long exposure photograph, which is obtained by locking the shutter open for most of the intensely dark part of a moonless night. The resulting photograph reveals a multitude of concentric arcs (portions of perfect circles) from which the exact center can be readily derived, and which corresponds to the Celestial pole, which lies directly above the position of the true pole (North or South) on the horizon. A published photograph exposed for nearly 8 hours demonstrates this effect.

The Northern Celestial pole is currently (but not permanently) within a fraction of 1 degree of the bright star Polaris. The exact position of the pole changes over thousands of years because of the precession of the equinoxes. Polaris is also known as the North Star, and is generically called a pole star or lodestar. Polaris is only visible during fair weather at night to inhabitants of the Northern Hemisphere. The asterism "Big Dipper" may be used to find Polaris. The 2 corner stars of the "pan" (those opposite from the handle) point above the top of the "pan" to Polaris.

While observers in the Northern Hemisphere can use the star Polaris to determine the Northern celestial pole, the South Star in the constellation Octans is too faint to use for navigation. For this reason, the preferred alternative is to use the constellation Crux (The Southern Cross). The southern celestial pole lies at the intersection of (a) the line along the long axis of crux (i.e. through Alpha Crucis and Gamma Crucis) and (b) a line perpendicularly bisecting the line joining the "Pointers" (Alpha Centauri and Beta Centauri).

== Satellite navigation ==
Near the end of the 20th century, the advent of satellite-based Global Positioning Systems (GPS) provided yet another means for any individual to determine true north accurately. While GPS Receivers (GPSRs) function best with a clear view of the entire sky, they function day or night, and in all but the most severe weather. The government agencies responsible for the satellites continuously monitor and adjust them to maintain their accurate alignment with the Earth. In contrast with the gyrocompass which is most accurate when stationary, the GPS receiver, if it has only one antenna, must be moving, typically at more than 0.1 mph (0.2 km/h), to correctly display compass directions. On ships and aircraft, GPS receivers are often equipped with two or more antennas, separately attached to the vehicle. The exact latitudes and longitudes of the antennas are determined, which allows the cardinal directions to be calculated relative to the structure of the vehicle. Within these limitations GPSRs are considered both accurate and reliable. The GPSR has thus become the fastest and most convenient way to obtain a verifiable alignment with the cardinal directions.

== Radio methods ==
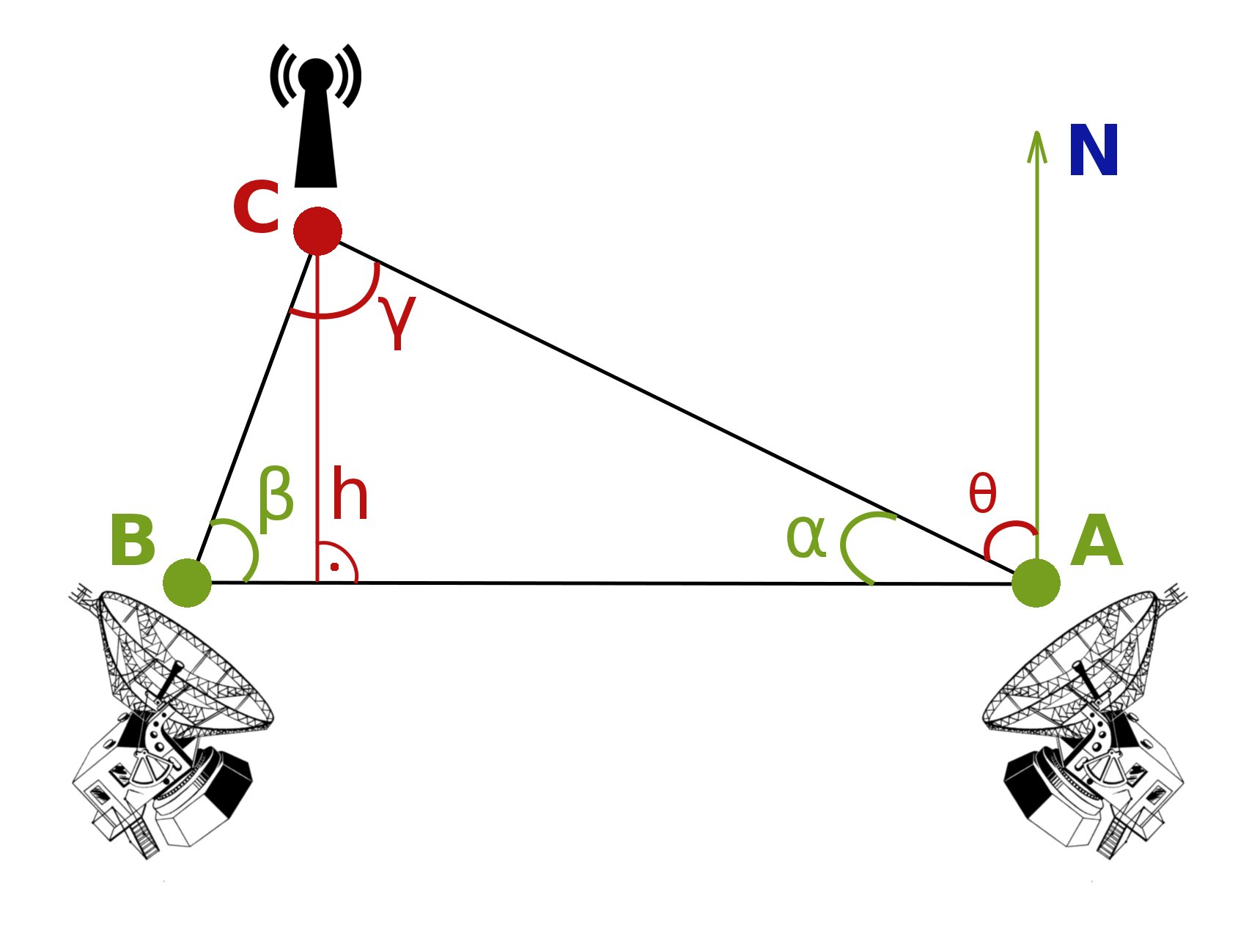
Radiotriangulation scheme using two direction-finding antennas (A and B)

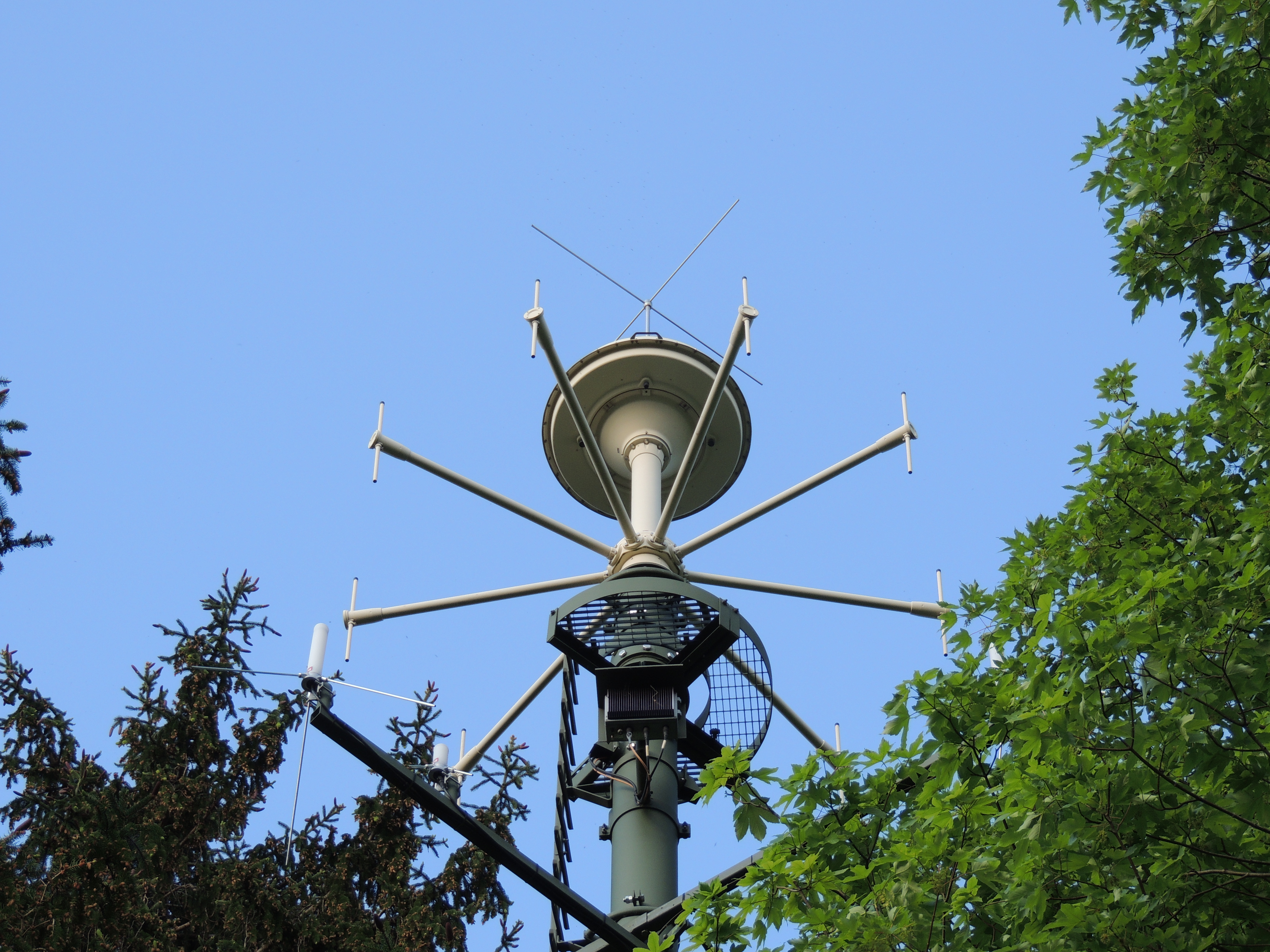
Direction finding antenna near the city of Lucerne, Switzerland

Direction finding (DF), radio direction finding (RDF), or radiogoniometry is the use of radio waves to determine the direction to a radio source. The source may be a cooperating radio transmitter or may be an inadvertent source, a naturally occurring radio source, or an illicit or enemy system. Radio direction finding differs from radar in that only the direction is determined by any one receiver; a radar system usually also gives a distance to the object of interest, as well as direction. By triangulation, the location of a radio source can be determined by measuring its direction from two or more locations. Radio direction finding is used in radio navigation for ships and aircraft, to locate emergency transmitters for search and rescue, for tracking wildlife, and to locate illegal or interfering transmitters. During the Second World War, radio direction finding was used by both sides to locate and direct aircraft, surface ships, and submarines.

RDF systems can be used with any radio source, although very long wavelengths (low frequencies) require very large antennas, and are generally used only on ground-based systems. These wavelengths are nevertheless used for marine radio navigation as they can travel very long distances "over the horizon", which is valuable for ships when the line-of-sight may be only a few tens of kilometres. For aerial use, where the horizon may extend to hundreds of kilometres, higher frequencies can be used, allowing the use of much smaller antennas. An automatic direction finder, which could be tuned to radio beacons called non-directional beacons or commercial AM radio broadcasters, was in the 20th century a feature of most aircraft, but is being phased out.

For the military, RDF is a key tool of signals intelligence. The ability to locate the position of an enemy transmitter has been invaluable since World War I, and played a key role in World War II's Battle of the Atlantic. It is estimated that the UK's advanced "huff-duff" systems were directly or indirectly responsible for 24% of all U-boats sunk during the war. Modern systems often used phased array antennas to allow rapid beamforming for highly accurate results, and are part of a larger electronic warfare suite.

Early radio direction finders used mechanically rotated antennas that compared signal strengths, and several electronic versions of the same concept followed. Modern systems use the comparison of phase or doppler techniques which are generally simpler to automate. Early British radar sets were referred to as RDF, which is often stated was a deception. In fact, the Chain Home systems used large RDF receivers to determine directions. Later radar systems generally used a single antenna for broadcast and reception, and determined direction from the direction the antenna was facing.

== See also ==
- Direction of prayer
- Pole star
- Position determination
- Sense of direction
