= Proper right and proper left =

Terms for unambiguous directions, like port and starboard

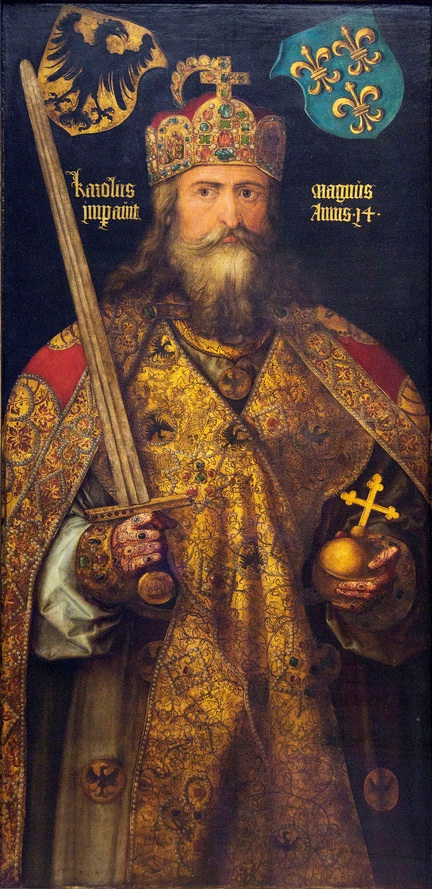
Charlemagne holds a sword in his proper right hand, on the "viewer's left", and an orb in his proper left hand, on the "viewer's right".

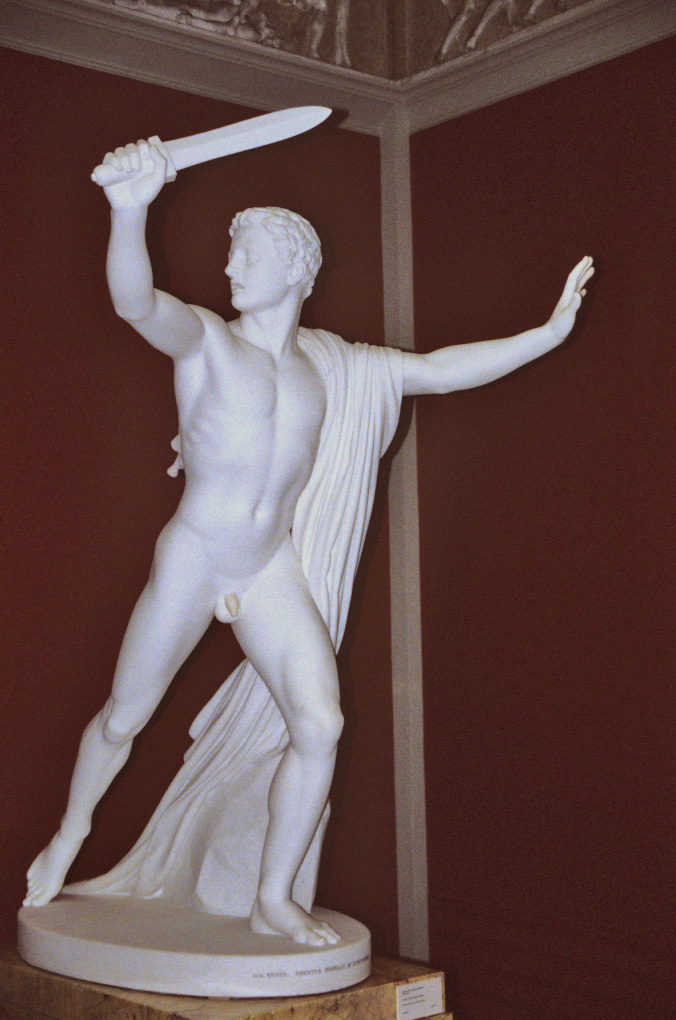
Statue holding a sword in its proper right hand

Proper right and proper left are terms used to unambiguously convey relative direction when describing an image or other object. Proper comes from a Latin word meaning "one's own"; the "proper right" hand of a figure is the hand that would be regarded by that figure as its own right hand. In a frontal representation, that appears on the left as the viewer sees it, creating the potential for ambiguity if the hand is just described as the "right hand".

The terms are mainly used in discussing images of humans, whether in art history, medical contexts such as x-ray images, or elsewhere, but they can be used in describing any object that has an unambiguous front and back (for example furniture) or, when describing things that move or change position, with reference to the original position. However a more restricted use may be preferred, and the internal instructions for cataloguing objects in the "Inventory of American Sculpture" at the Smithsonian American Art Museum say that "The terms 'proper right' and 'proper left' should be used when describing figures only". In heraldry, right and left is always used in the meaning of proper right and proper left, as for the imaginary bearer of a coat of arms; to avoid confusion, the Latin terms dexter and sinister are often used.

The alternative is to use language that makes it clear that the viewer's perspective is being used. The swords in the illustrations might be described as: "to the left as the viewer sees it", "at the view's left", "at the viewer's left", and so on. However these formulations do not work for freestanding sculpture in the round, where the viewer might be at any position around the sculpture. A British 19th-century manual for military drill contrasts "proper left" with "present left" when discussing the orientation of formations performing intricate movements on a parade ground, "proper" meaning the orientation at the start of the drill.

The terms are analogous to the nautical port and starboard, where "port" is to a watercraft as "proper left" is to a sculpture, and they are used for essentially the same reason. Their use obviates the need for potentially ambiguous language such as "my right", "your left", and so on, by expressing the direction in a manner that holds true regardless of the relative orientations of the object and observer. Another example is stage right and left in the theatre, which uses the actor's orientation, "stage right" equating to the audience's "house left".

== Examples of usage ==
This is from the auction catalogue description of an African wood figure:

There is extensive insect loss in the proper right leg, some at the proper right elbow, and at the fronts of both feet. There is a chip off the proper right breast, and the proper right leg was broken off and reglued.

Describing an Indian sculpture:

The figure standing on the yakṣī's proper left, however, is not a mirror image of the other male ...
