= Port and starboard =

Nautical terms for direction

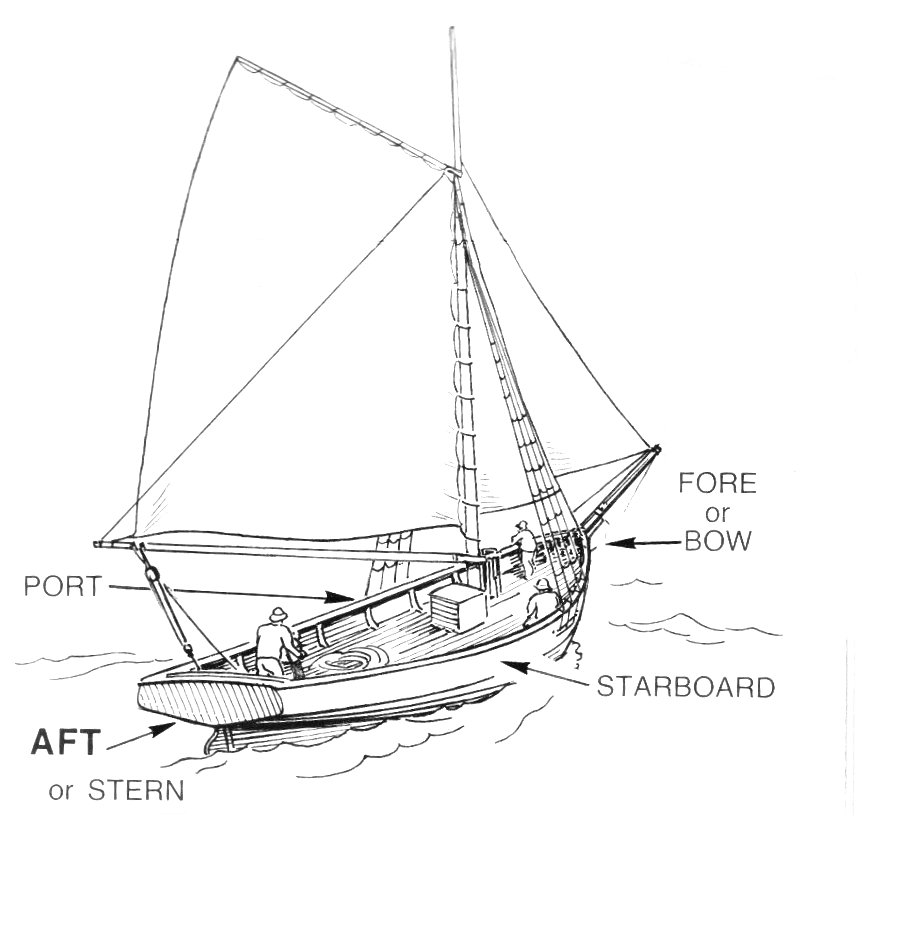

Schematic view of a ship's navigation lights indicating its port (red) and starboard (green) sides

Port and starboard are nautical terms for watercraft, aircraft and spacecraft, referring respectively to the left and right sides of the vessel, when aboard and facing the bow (front).

Vessels with bilateral symmetry have left and right halves which are mirror images of each other. One asymmetric feature is where access to a boat, ship, or aircraft is at the side; it is usually only on the port side (hence the name).

== Side ==
Port side and starboard side respectively refer to the left and right sides of the vessel, when aboard and facing the bow. The port and starboard sides of the vessel always refer to the same portion of the vessel's structure, and do not depend on the position of someone aboard the vessel.

The port side is the side to the left of an observer aboard the vessel and facing the bow, towards the direction the vessel is heading when underway in the forward direction. The starboard side is to the right of such an observer.

This convention allows orders and information to be communicated unambiguously, without needing to know which way any particular crew member is facing.

== Etymology ==
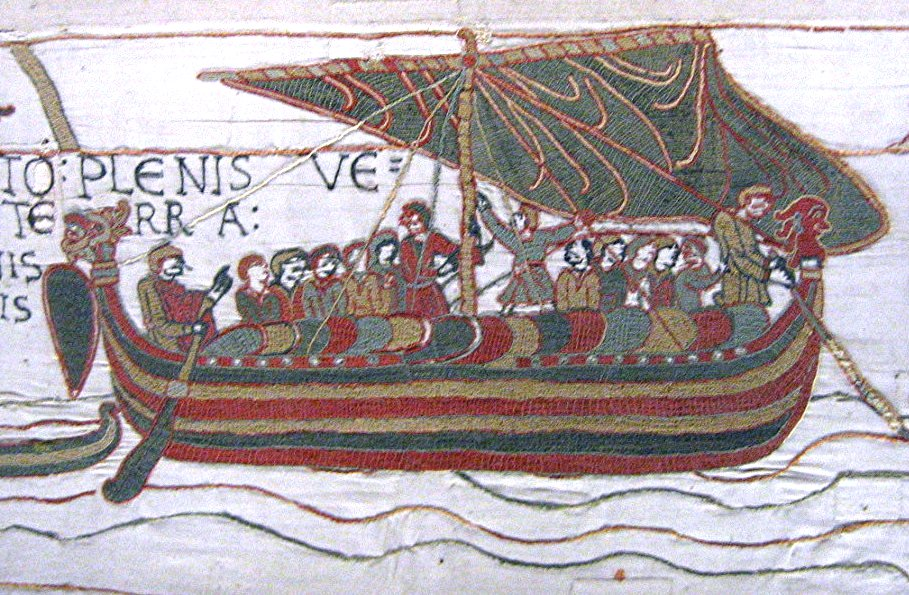
Image from the Bayeux Tapestry showing a longship with a steering oar on the starboard side.

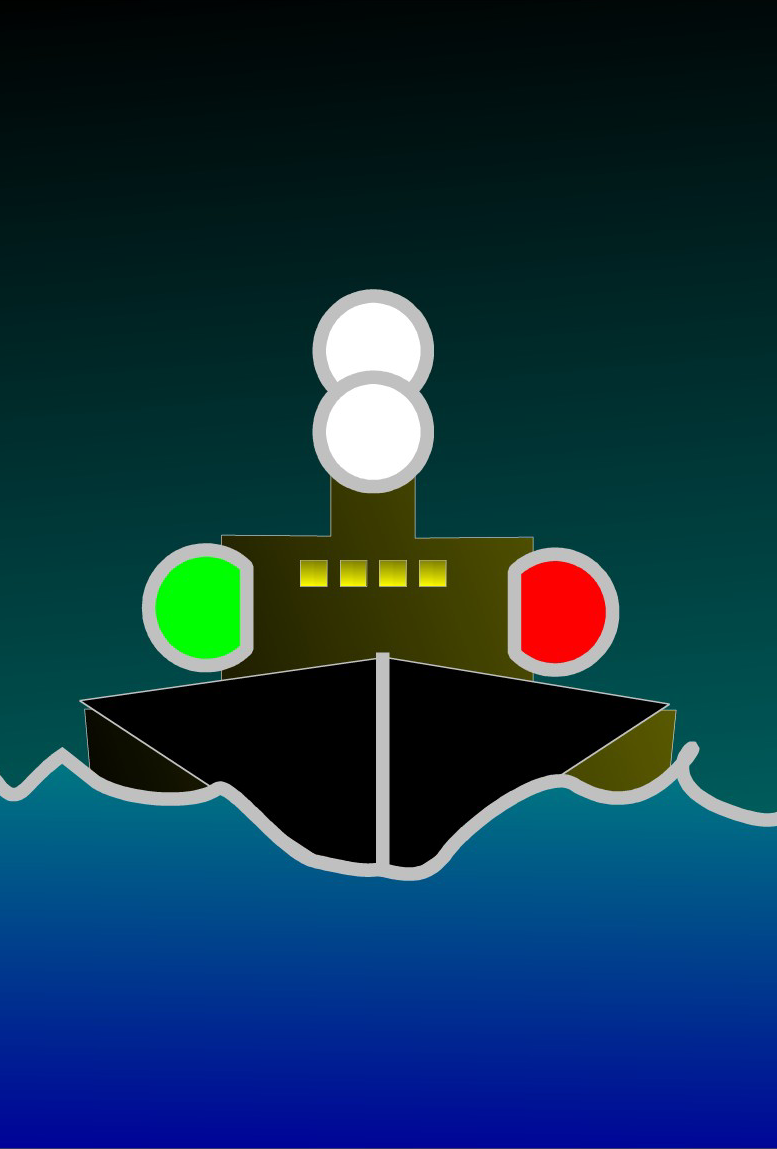
Oncoming boat indicating its port (red) and starboard (green) sides

Starboard derives from the Old English steorbord, steor meaning steer, and bord meaning side. Before ships had rudders, they were steered with a steering oar on the right hand side of the ship, because more people are right-handed. The "steer-board" etymology is shared by the German Steuerbord, Dutch stuurboord, Icelandic stjórnborði, Scandinavian styrbord, French tribord, Italian tribordo, (Note: However the proper Italian terms for starboard and port are dritta and sinistra respectively. The offshoots from French tribordo and babordo were largely, and only, used in adventure novels of the nineteenth century translated from French.) Portuguese estibordo, Spanish estribor and Estonian tüürpoord.

Since the steering oar was on the right side of the boat, it would dock on the left side. In Old English, this side was known as bæcbord. An Anglo-Saxon record of a voyage by Ohthere of Hålogaland used the word "bæcbord" ("back-board") for the left side of a ship. With the steering rudder on the starboard side, the man on the rudder had his back to the left side of ship. German Backbord, Dutch bakboord, Icelandic bakborði, Swedish babord, Spanish babor, Portuguese bombordo, Italian babordo, French bâbord, and Estonian pakpoord, are all cognate.

From around 1300, the term ladde-borde was used, from Middle English ladebord, lade meaning load, and bord meaning side. Ladebord was changed to larboard in the 1500s, possibly by association with starboard. This side was also called port, since it was the docking side. The Oxford English Dictionary cites this usage since 1543.

Larboard sounds similar to starboard and in 1844 the Royal Navy ordered that port be used instead. The United States Navy followed suit in 1846. Larboard continued to be used well into the 1850s by whalers. In chapter 12 of Life on the Mississippi (1883), Mark Twain writes larboard to refer to the left side of the ship (Mississippi River steamboat) in his days on the river – circa 1857–1861. Lewis Carroll rhymed larboard and starboard in "Fit the Second" of The Hunting of the Snark (1876).

== Importance of standard terms ==
The navigational treaty convention, the International Regulations for Preventing Collisions at Sea—for instance, as appears in the UK's Merchant Shipping (Distress Signals and Prevention of Collisions) Regulations 1996 (and comparable US documents from the US Coast Guard)—sets forth requirements for maritime vessels to avoid collisions, whether by sail or powered, and whether a vessel is overtaking, approaching head-on, or crossing. To set forth these navigational rules, the terms starboard and port are essential, and to aid in in situ decision-making, the two sides of each vessel are marked, dusk to dawn, by navigation lights, the vessel's starboard side by green and its port side by red. Aircraft are lit in the same way.

== Other nautical uses ==
Port and starboard are also commonly used when dividing crews; for example with a two watch system the teams supplying the personnel are often named Port and Starboard. This may extend to entire crews, such as the forward-deployed crews of the Royal Navy's Gulf-based frigate, or ballistic missile submarines.

== See also ==
- Anatomical terms of location, another example of terms of directionality that do not depend on the location of the observer for things that are bilaterally symmetrical
- Dexter and sinister, in heraldry
- Glossary of nautical terms
- List of ship directions
- Proper right and proper left, in images of people, etc.
- Reflection symmetry
- Sinistral and dextral, chirality, in scientific contexts
- Terms of orientation
