= Haplogroup E-V42 =

- Possible time of origin: ~4,200 years before present (Bronze Age)
- Possible place of origin: Arabian Peninsula (southern Arabia)
- Ancestor: E-Z830 (within E-M35 / E-V1515)
- Descendants: E-BY36924, E-Y23661, E-Y44734
- Defining mutations: V42
- Highest frequencies: Saudi Arabia, Yemen, Kuwait

Haplogroup E-V42 is a rare and early‑diverging human Y-chromosome lineage belonging to the broader E-M35 (E1b1b1) phylogeny. It is defined by the single-nucleotide polymorphism V42 and is a subclade of E-Z830, the paternal lineage carried by the Natufian hunter‑gatherers of the Levant. Modern distribution and high‑resolution sequencing show that E‑V42 is overwhelmingly concentrated in the Arabian Peninsula, with only minor, derived branches found in northeast Africa and Iberia. Its time to the most recent common ancestor (TMRCA) is estimated at approximately 4,200 years before present (ybp), placing its initial diversification in the Middle to Late Bronze Age.

== Phylogeny and relationship to the Natufians ==
E-V42 belongs to the well‑resolved Y‑chromosome tree:

- E-M35 (E1b1b1) → E-Z827 (E1b1b1b) → E-Z830 → E-V1515 → E-V42.

The upstream clade E-Z830 is historically significant because it was the dominant paternal lineage of the Natufian culture (c. 15,000–12,000 ybp) in the Levant. In the landmark ancient DNA study by Lazaridis et al. (2016), which analysed 44 ancient Near Eastern remains, nearly all Natufian males carried E‑Z830 (samples I0861, I1072, etc.). The Natufians were among the first people to adopt sedentary life and early forms of agriculture, and their descendants later spread into the Arabian Peninsula and North Africa.

From E‑Z830, two major branches emerged: E-M123 (widespread in the Middle East, Europe, and Africa) and E-V1515. E-V1515 further splits into several subclades, including E-M293 (associated with pastoralist expansions in East Africa) and E-V42. Unlike E-M123, which dispersed widely, E‑V42 remained largely confined to Arabia, suggesting long‑term paternal continuity in the peninsula since the Bronze Age.

== Refined phylogeny and dispersal patterns (2026 study) ==
A comprehensive high‑resolution study by Mohammed & Harorh (2026) examined 127 publicly available Y‑chromosome sequences assigned to E‑V42 from the YFull YTree database (version 13.07.00, accessed 31 January 2026). This is the largest and most detailed analysis of E‑V42 to date.

=== Key findings ===
- Geographic core: More than 89% of the 127 samples originated from the Arabian Peninsula:
  - Saudi Arabia: 82 samples (64.6%)
  - Yemen: 15 samples (11.8%)
  - Kuwait: 17 samples (13.4%)
  - Qatar, Bahrain, and other Arabian states: minor numbers.

This distribution firmly establishes southern Arabia as the primary demographic and phylogenetic centre of E‑V42.

- Temporal framework: The TMRCA of the entire E‑V42 lineage was calculated at ~4,200 ybp (Bronze Age), using corrected SNP counts from X‑degenerate regions and a mutation rate of 0.8178 × 10^{−9} per base pair per year. Major subclades show internal diversification:
  - E-BY36924: ~3,800 ybp
  - E-Y23661: ~2,500 ybp

These ages indicate prolonged in‑situ evolution within Arabia rather than a single rapid expansion.

- Outlier lineages:
  - Horn of Africa: A few isolated E‑V42 carriers (e.g., the single Ethiopian Jew originally reported by Trombetta et al. 2011) are interpreted as low‑frequency traces of prehistoric gene flow across the Red Sea, not as an African origin for the clade.
  - Iberia (Portugal): The terminal subclade E-Y44734 appears exclusively in three Portuguese samples, with an extremely shallow TMRCA of ~125 ybp. This points to a historical‑period introduction, plausibly via medieval population movements from North Africa (e.g., during the Islamic period or later Ottoman‑era contacts).
- Comparison with earlier models: While Trombetta et al. (2015) had placed E‑V42 within E-V1515 and suggested a northern Horn of Africa origin for the broader clade, the expanded dataset of Mohammed & Harorh (2026) demonstrates that the vast majority of E‑V42 diversity and frequency lies in Arabia. The earlier African samples are now seen as peripheral, not basal.

The study concludes that E‑V42 exemplifies long‑term paternal continuity in southern Arabia from the Bronze Age onwards, and its rare occurrences outside the peninsula are best explained by episodic, historically mediated gene flow rather than by prehistoric dispersals.

== Geographic distribution ==
Based on the 127 YFull sequences (Mohammed & Harorh 2026, supplemented by earlier reports):

Distribution of E-V42 samples
Region / Country	Number of samples	Percentage
Saudi Arabia	82	64.6%
Kuwait	17	13.4%
Yemen	15	11.8%
Portugal	3	2.4%
Syria	2	1.6%
Qatar	1	0.8%
Iraq	1	0.8%
Egypt	1	0.8%
Bahrain	1	0.8%
Unknown / unreported	4	3.1%
Total	127	100%

Note: Percentages are relative to the convenience sample available on YFull; they do not represent unbiased population frequencies.

Outside the Arabian core, the only structured subclade is E-Y44734 in Portugal. Other single occurrences in Syria, Iraq, and Egypt are likely due to recent mobility and do not indicate local diversification.

== Archaeological and historical context ==
The TMRCA of E‑V42 (~4,200 ybp) coincides with the Middle to Late Bronze Age in the Arabian Peninsula. This period witnessed the rise of oasis farming, long‑distance trade (e.g., the Magan and Dilmun civilisations), and early state formation. The deep rooting of E‑V42 in Arabia supports a model of indigenous paternal continuity rather than a replacement by later migrations.

The presence of the ancestral lineage E-Z830 in Natufian and Pre-Pottery Neolithic B (PPNB) remains (Lazaridis et al. 2016; ʿAin Ghazal, Jordan) provides a direct link between the Pleistocene hunter‑gatherers of the Levant and the Bronze Age populations of Arabia. This connection is further strengthened by the distribution of E‑V42, which appears to be a local Arabian offshoot of that ancient Levantine stock.

== Methodological considerations ==
All age estimates are model‑based and depend on the mutation rate and SNP selection criteria. The YFull dataset is a convenience sample, so frequencies should be interpreted cautiously. Future ancient DNA recovery from Bronze Age Arabian sites is needed to validate the proposed chronology.

== See also ==
- Haplogroup E-M35
- Haplogroup E-Z827
- Natufian culture
