= Haplogroup E-M35 =

Human Y-chromosome DNA haplogroup

- Possible time of origin: 34,800 BP
- Coalescence age: 23,900 BP
- Possible place of origin: Eastern Africa (Note: Semino et al. (2004): "Both phylogeography and microsatellite variance suggest that E-P2 and its derivative, E-M35, probably originated in eastern Africa.")
- Ancestor: E-M215
- Descendants: E-V68, E-Z827
- Defining mutations: M35

E-M35, also known as E1b1b1-M35, is a human Y-chromosome DNA haplogroup. E-M35 has two basal branches, E-V68 and E-Z827. E-V68 and E-Z827 are primarily distributed in North Africa and the Horn of Africa, and occur at lower frequencies in the Middle East, Europe, and Southern Africa.

== Origins ==
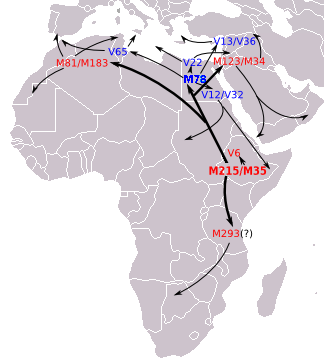
The ancient dispersals of the major E-M35 lineages. The map shows the supposed earliest movements of E-M215 lineages as described in the most recent articles.

In June 2015, Trombetta et al. reported a previously unappreciated large difference in the age between haplogroup E-M215 (38.6 kya; 95% CI 31.4–45.9 kya) and its sub-haplogroup E-M35 (25.0 kya; 95% CI 20.0–30.0 kya) and estimated its origin to be in Horn of Africa, where the node separating the E-V38 and E-M215 branches occurs about 47,500 years ago (95% CI: 41.3–56.8 ka). E-M35 was dated by Batini in 2015 to between 15,400 and 20,500 years ago.

All major sub-branches of E-M35 are thought to have originated in the same general area as the parent clade: in North Africa, the Horn of Africa, or nearby areas of the Near East. Some branches of E-M35 are assumed to have left Africa thousands of years ago, whereas others may have arrived from the Near East. For example, Underhill (2002) associates the spread of the haplogroup with the Neolithic Revolution, believing that the structure and regional pattern of E-M35 subclades potentially give "reagents with which to infer specific episodes of population histories associated with the Neolithic agricultural expansion". Battaglia et al. (2008) also estimate that E-M78 (called E1b1b1a1 in that paper) has been in Europe longer than 10,000 years. Accordingly, human remains excavated in a Spanish funeral cave dating from approximately 7,000 years ago were shown to be in this haplogroup. Two more E-M78 have been found in the Neolithic Sopot and Lengyel cultures too.

Concerning E-M35 in Europe within this scheme, Underhill & Kivisild (2007) have remarked that E-M215 seems to represent a late-Pleistocene migration from North Africa to Europe over the Sinai Peninsula in Egypt. (Note: "Y chromosome data show a signal for a separate late-Pleistocene migration from Africa to Europe via Sinai as evidenced through the distribution of haplogroup E3b lineages, which is not manifested in mtDNA haplogroup distributions."Underhill & Kivisild (2007:547)) While this proposal remains uncontested, it has more recently been proposed by Trombetta et al. (2011) that there is also evidence for additional migration of E-M215 carrying men directly from North Africa to southwestern Europe, via a maritime route (see below.)

== Ancient DNA ==
According to Lazaridis et al. (2016), Natufian skeletal remains from the ancient Levant predominantly carried the Y-DNA haplogroup E. Of the five Natufian specimens analysed for paternal lineages, one belonged to CT, one to E-M35, one to E-M215, one to E-Z830. Haplogroup E-M35 was also found the dominant marker among fossils from the ensuing Pre-Pottery Neolithic B culture, with the E-M78 and E-Z830 subclades observed in multiple PPNB specimens (~50%).

Following Fregel et al. (2017), two Neolithic farmers from the North African site of Ifri n Ammar ou Moussa belonged to haplogroup E-L19. The majority of their genomes traced back to Natufian and PPN ancestry, indicating a recent intrusion into North Africa from the Levant. Their presence is likely linked to the spread of pastoral technologies from the Levant into North Africa.

Loosdrecht et al. (2018) analysed genome-wide data from seven ancient Iberomaurusian individuals from the Grotte des Pigeons near Taforalt in eastern Morocco. The fossils were directly dated to between 15,100 and 13,900 calibrated years before present. The scientists found that five male specimens with sufficient nuclear DNA preservation all belonged to the E1b1b1a1 (M78) subclade, with one skeleton bearing the E1b1b1a1b1 parent lineage to E-V13. Martiniano et al. (2022) later reassigned all the Taforalt samples to haplogroup E-M78 and none to E-L618, the predecessor to E-V13.

Haplogroup E-M35 has been identified among both Amorite and Akkadian remains, found in the sites of Megiddo, Ebla, and Alalakh. It is also attested among later Semitic populations, such as the Phoenicians who settled throughout the Mediterranean region, where it appears to have been the most prevalent lineage.

In Egypt, haplogroup E-V1515 has been identified in the remains of an elite Egyptian individual from the site of Nuerat, dating to the Old Kingdom period, while haplogroup E-V22 has been detected in an ancient Egyptian mummy excavated at the Abusir el-Meleq archaeological site in Middle Egypt, dated to between the late New Kingdom and the Roman era.

== Distribution ==
E-M215 and E-M35 are quite common among Afroasiatic speakers. The linguistic group and carriers of E-M35 lineage have a high probability to have arisen and dispersed together from the Afroasiatic Urheimat. Amongst populations with an Afro-Asiatic speaking history, a significant proportion of Palestinians and Jewish male lineages are E-M35. Haplogroup E-M35, which accounts for approximately 18% to 20% of 18% of Palestinians and Ashkenazi and 8.6% to 30% of Sephardi Y-chromosomes, appears to be one of the major founding lineages of the Palestinian and the Jewish population. (Note: "Paragroup E-M35 * and haplogroup J-12f2a* fit the criteria for major AJ founding lineages because they are widespread both in AJ populations and in Near Eastern populations, and occur at much lower frequencies in European non-Jewish populations." Behar et al. (2004))

The following table only includes sample populations with more than 1% E-M215 men with all known subclades as of June 2015. It contains the E-V1515 clade defined by Trombetta et al. 2015, and all the E1b1b subclades distributed below the Sahara ( E-V42, E-M293, E-V92, E-V6), which were identified as E-M35 basal clades in a former phylogeny.

Population	N	Region	Language	Total E-M215	E-V2009	E-M78*	E-V1477	E-V1083*	E-V13	E-V22	E-V12*	E-V32	E-V259	E-V65	E-V257*	E-M81	E-M123*	E-M34	E-V1515*	E-V1486*	E-V2881*	E-V1792	E-V92	E-M293*	E-V3065	E-V42	E-V1785*	E-V6	E-V16
Northern Africa																													
Moroccan Arabs	55	Morocco	AA/Semitic	15.9	0.0	0.0	0.0	0.0	0.0	7.3	0.0	0.0	0.0	32.7	0.0	30.9	0.0	0.0	0.0	0.0	0.0	0.0	0.0	0.0	0.0	0.0	0.0	0.0	0.0
Asni Berbers	54	Morocco	AA/Berber	85.2	0.0	0.0	0.0	0.0	0.0	3.7	0.0	0.0	0.0	0.0	1.9	79.6	0.0	0.0	0.0	0.0	0.0	0.0	0.0	0.0	0.0	0.0	0.0	0.0	0.0
Bouhria Berbers	67	Morocco	AA/Berber	79.1	0.0	0.0	0.0	0.0	1.5	0.0	0.0	0.0	0.0	0.0	0.0	77.6	0.0	0.0	0.0	0.0	0.0	0.0	0.0	0.0	0.0	0.0	0.0	0.0	0.0
Middle Atlas Berbers	69	Morocco	AA/Berber	81.2	0.0	0.0	0.0	0.0	0.0	0.0	0.0	0.0	0.0	10.1	0.0	71.0	0.0	0.0	0.0	0.0	0.0	0.0	0.0	0.0	0.0	0.0	0.0	0.0	0.0
Marrakech Berbers	27	Morocco	AA/Berber	92.6	0.0	0.0	0.0	0.0	0.0	3.7	3.7	0.0	0.0	0.0	3.7	77.8	0.0	3.7	0.0	0.0	0.0	0.0	0.0	0.0	0.0	0.0	0.0	0.0	0.0
Souss Berbers	34	Morocco	AA/Berber	79.4	2.9	0.0	0.0	0.0	0.0	0.0	0.0	0.0	0.0	0.0	0.0	76.5	0.0	0.0	0.0	0.0	0.0	0.0	0.0	0.0	0.0	0.0	0.0	0.0	0.0
Ouarzazate Berbers	31	Morocco	AA/Berber	54.8	0.0	0.0	0.0	0.0	0.0	0.0	0.0	0.0	0.0	0.0	0.0	54.8	0.0	0.0	0.0	0.0	0.0	0.0	0.0	0.0	0.0	0.0	0.0	0.0	0.0
Mozabite Berbers	67	Algeria	AA/Berber	89.6	0.0	0.0	0.0	0.0	0.0	0.0	0.0	0.0	0.0	1.5	0.0	86.6	0.0	1.5	0.0	0.0	0.0	0.0	0.0	0.0	0.0	0.0	0.0	0.0	0.0
Tunisian Jews	10	Tunisia	AA/Semitic	20.0	0.0	0.0	10.0	0.0	0.0	0.0	0.0	0.0	0.0	0.0	0.0	10.0	0.0	0.0	0.0	0.0	0.0	0.0	0.0	0.0	0.0	0.0	0.0	0.0	0.0
Libyan Arabs	10	Libya	AA/Semitic	20.0	0.0	0.0	0.0	0.0	0.0	0.0	0.0	0.0	0.0	20.0	0.0	30.0	0.0	0.0	0.0	0.0	0.0	0.0	0.0	0.0	0.0	0.0	0.0	0.0	0.0
Libyan Jews	23	Libya	AA/Semitic	26.1	0.0	0.0	0.0	0.0	4.3	0.0	0.0	0.0	0.0	4.3	0.0	0.0	0.0	17.4	0.0	0.0	0.0	0.0	0.0	0.0	0.0	0.0	0.0	0.0	0.0
Northern Egyptians	49	Egypt	AA/Semitic	20.9	0.0	0.0	0.0	0.0	2.0	16.3	4.1	2.0	0.0	0.0	0.0	4.1	4.1	10.2	0.0	0.0	0.0	0.0	0.0	0.0	0.0	0.0	0.0	0.0	0.0
Egyptian Berbers from Siwa	93	Egypt	AA/Semitic	18.3	0.0	0.0	0.0	0.0	0.0	0.0	2.2	0.0	0.0	4.3	2.2	1.1	0.0	2.2	0.0	0.0	0.0	0.0	0.0	0.0	0.0	0.0	0.0	6.5	0.0
Egyptians from Baharia	41	Egypt	AA/Semitic	56.1	0.0	0.0	0.0	0.0	2.4	22.0	14.6	0.0	0.0	2.4	7.3	4.9	0.0	0.0	0.0	0.0	0.0	0.0	0.0	0.0	0.0	0.0	0.0	2.4	0.0
Egyptians from Gurna Oasis	34	Egypt	AA/Semitic	17.6	0.0	5.9	0.0	0.0	0.0	0.0	8.8	2.9	0.0	0.0	0.0	0.0	0.0	0.0	0.0	0.0	0.0	0.0	0.0	0.0	0.0	0.0	0.0	0.0	0.0
Southern Egyptians	47	Egypt	AA/Semitic	78.7	0.0	0.0	0.0	0.0	0.0	0.0	74.5	0.0	0.0	0.0	0.0	0.0	2.1	2.1	0.0	0.0	0.0	0.0	0.0	0.0	0.0	0.0	0.0	0.0	0.0
Western/Central Africa																													
Mandenka	16	Senegal	NC/Mande	6.3	0.0	0.0	0.0	0.0	0.0	0.0	6.3	0.0	0.0	0.0	0.0	0.0	0.0	0.0	0.0	0.0	0.0	0.0	0.0	0.0	0.0	0.0	0.0	0.0	0.0
Tuareg	22	Niger	AA/Berber	13.6	0.0	0.0	0.0	0.0	0.0	0.0	4.5	0.0	0.0	0.0	0.0	9.1	0.0	0.0	0.0	0.0	0.0	0.0	0.0	0.0	0.0	0.0	0.0	0.0	0.0
Daba	29	Cameroon (North)	AA/Chadic	3.4	0.0	0.0	0.0	0.0	0.0	0.0	0.0	0.0	3.4	0.0	0.0	0.0	0.0	0.0	0.0	0.0	0.0	0.0	0.0	0.0	0.0	0.0	0.0	0.0	0.0
Guidar	9	Cameroon (North)	AA/Chadic	11.1	0.0	0.0	0.0	0.0	0.0	0.0	0.0	0.0	11.1	0.0	0.0	0.0	0.0	0.0	0.0	0.0	0.0	0.0	0.0	0.0	0.0	0.0	0.0	0.0	0.0
Mandara	82	Cameroon (North)	AA/Chadic	2.4	0.0	0.0	0.0	0.0	0.0	0.0	1.2	0.0	0.0	0.0	1.2	0.0	0.0	0.0	0.0	0.0	0.0	0.0	0.0	0.0	0.0	0.0	0.0	0.0	0.0
Shuwa Arabs	5	Cameroon (North)	AA/Semitic	20.0	0.0	0.0	0.0	0.0	0.0	0.0	0.0	0.0	0.0	0.0	20.0	0.0	0.0	0.0	0.0	0.0	0.0	0.0	0.0	0.0	0.0	0.0	0.0	0.0	0.0
Fulbe from Cameroon	76	Cameroon (North)	NC/Atlantic	1.3	1.3	0.0	0.0	0.0	0.0	0.0	0.0	0.0	0.0	0.0	0.0	0.0	0.0	0.0	0.0	0.0	0.0	0.0	0.0	0.0	0.0	0.0	0.0	0.0	0.0
Moundang	21	Cameroon (North)	NC/Adamawa	4.8	0.0	0.0	0.0	0.0	0.0	0.0	0.0	4.8	0.0	0.0	0.0	0.0	0.0	0.0	0.0	0.0	0.0	0.0	0.0	0.0	0.0	0.0	0.0	0.0	0.0
Eastern Africa																													
Tigre	5	Eritrea	AA/Semitic	100.0	0.0	0.0	0.0	0.0	0.0	0.0	0.0	60.0	0.0	0.0	0.0	0.0	0.0	0.0	20.0	0.0	0.0	0.0	0.0	0.0	0.0	0.0	0.0	20.0	0.0
Nara	15	Eritrea	NS/Sudanic	60.0	0.0	0.0	0.0	0.0	0.0	6.7	0.0	13.3	0.0	0.0	0.0	0.0	0.0	0.0	13.3	6.7	0.0	0.0	0.0	0.0	0.0	13.3	0.0	6.7	0.0
Cunama	20	Eritrea	NS/Cunama	65.0	0.0	0.0	0.0	0.0	0.0	5.0	0.0	20.0	0.0	0.0	0.0	0.0	0.0	5.0	0.0	0.0	5.0	0.0	0.0	0.0	0.0	15.0	10.0	5.0	0.0
Saho	94	Eritrea	AA/Cushitic	98.9	0.0	0.0	0.0	1.1	0.0	88.3	0.0	0.0	0.0	0.0	0.0	0.0	0.0	1.1	0.0	0.0	0.0	0.0	0.0	0.0	0.0	0.0	0.0	8.5	0.0
Tigrai	32	Eritrea/Ethiopia	AA/Semitic	71.9	0.0	0.0	0.0	0.0	0.0	3.1	3.1	21.9	0.0	0.0	0.0	0.0	0.0	0.0	0.0	3.1	3.1	0.0	0.0	0.0	0.0	0.0	31.3	6.3	0.0
Afar	25	Djibouti	AA/Cushitic	60.0	0.0	0.0	0.0	0.0	0.0	0.0	0.0	0.0	0.0	0.0	0.0	0.0	0.0	4.0	0.0	0.0	0.0	0.0	0.0	0.0	0.0	0.0	0.0	56.0	0.0
Somali	40	Djibouti	AA/Cushitic	25.0	0.0	0.0	0.0	0.0	0.0	0.0	0.0	25.0	0.0	0.0	0.0	0.0	0.0	0.0	0.0	0.0	0.0	0.0	0.0	0.0	0.0	0.0	0.0	0.0	0.0
Ethiopian Jews	22	Ethiopia	AA/Cushitic	31.8	0.0	0.0	0.0	0.0	0.0	0.0	0.0	9.1	0.0	0.0	0.0	0.0	0.0	13.6	0.0	0.0	0.0	0.0	0.0	0.0	0.0	9.1	0.0	0.0	0.0
Amhara	82	Ethiopia	AA/Semitic	45.1	0.0	0.0	0.0	0.0	0.0	2.4	0.0	11.0	0.0	0.0	0.0	0.0	0.0	13.4	0.0	0.0	2.4	0.0	1.2	0.0	0.0	1.2	0.0	8.5	4.9
Oromo	62	Ethiopia	AA/Cushitic	53.2	0.0	0.0	0.0	0.0	0.0	0.0	0.0	22.6	0.0	0.0	0.0	0.0	0.0	4.8	0.0	0.0	17.7	0.0	0.0	1.6	0.0	3.2	0.0	1.6	1.6
Wolayta	12	Ethiopia	AA/Omotic	58.3	0.0	0.0	0.0	0.0	0.0	8.3	0.0	8.3	0.0	0.0	0.0	0.0	0.0	8.3	0.0	0.0	8.3	0.0	0.0	8.3	0.0	0.0	0.0	16.7	0.0
Somali	12	Ethiopia	AA/Cushitic	50.0	0.0	0.0	0.0	0.0	0.0	8.3	0.0	25.0	0.0	0.0	0.0	0.0	0.0	0.0	0.0	0.0	16.7	0.0	0.0	0.0	0.0	0.0	0.0	0.0	0.0
Gurage	7	Ethiopia	AA/Semitic	42.9	0.0	0.0	0.0	0.0	0.0	28.6	0.0	0.0	0.0	0.0	0.0	0.0	0.0	0.0	0.0	0.0	0.0	0.0	0.0	0.0	0.0	0.0	0.0	14.3	0.0
Somali	5	Somalia	AA/Cushitic	100.0	0.0	0.0	0.0	0.0	0.0	0.0	0.0	80.0	0.0	0.0	0.0	0.0	0.0	0.0	0.0	0.0	0.0	20.0	0.0	0.0	0.0	0.0	0.0	0.0	0.0
Turkana	6	Kenya	NS/Sudanic	50.0	0.0	0.0	0.0	0.0	0.0	33.3	0.0	0.0	0.0	0.0	0.0	0.0	0.0	0.0	0.0	0.0	0.0	0.0	0.0	16.7	0.0	0.0	0.0	0.0	0.0
Borana	9	Kenya	AA/Cushitic	77.8	0.0	0.0	0.0	0.0	0.0	0.0	0.0	66.7	0.0	0.0	11.1	0.0	0.0	0.0	0.0	0.0	0.0	0.0	0.0	0.0	0.0	0.0	0.0	0.0	0.0
Somali	6	Kenya	AA/Cushitic	100.0	0.0	0.0	0.0	0.0	0.0	0.0	0.0	66.7	0.0	0.0	0.0	0.0	0.0	0.0	0.0	0.0	16.7	0.0	0.0	0.0	0.0	0.0	0.0	16.7	0.0
Nilotic Western Kenya	11	Kenya	NS/Sudanic	45.5	0.0	0.0	0.0	0.0	0.0	9.1	9.1	0.0	0.0	0.0	0.0	0.0	0.0	0.0	0.0	0.0	0.0	0.0	0.0	18.2	0.0	0.0	0.0	9.1	0.0
Luhya	51	Kenya	NC/Bantu	9.8	0.0	0.0	0.0	0.0	0.0	0.0	0.0	5.9	0.0	0.0	0.0	0.0	0.0	0.0	0.0	0.0	0.0	0.0	0.0	3.9	0.0	0.0	0.0	0.0	0.0
Other Bantu	17	Kenya	NC/Bantu	11.8	0.0	0.0	0.0	0.0	0.0	0.0	0.0	0.0	0.0	0.0	0.0	0.0	0.0	0.0	0.0	0.0	0.0	0.0	0.0	11.8	0.0	0.0	0.0	0.0	0.0
Kikuyu	9	Kenya	NC/Bantu	11.1	0.0	0.0	0.0	0.0	0.0	0.0	0.0	0.0	0.0	0.0	0.0	0.0	0.0	0.0	0.0	0.0	0.0	0.0	0.0	11.1	0.0	0.0	0.0	0.0	0.0
Maasai	45	Kenya	NS/Sudanic	37.8	0.0	0.0	0.0	0.0	0.0	6.7	0.0	6.7	0.0	0.0	0.0	0.0	0.0	0.0	0.0	0.0	0.0	0.0	0.0	24.4	0.0	0.0	0.0	0.0	0.0
Tutsi	9	Burundi	NC/Bantu	22.2	0.0	0.0	0.0	0.0	0.0	0.0	0.0	0.0	0.0	0.0	0.0	0.0	0.0	0.0	0.0	0.0	0.0	0.0	0.0	22.2	0.0	0.0	0.0	0.0	0.0
Southern Africa																													
!Kung	64	Angola	KS	10.9	0.0	0.0	0.0	0.0	0.0	0.0	0.0	0.0	0.0	0.0	0.0	0.0	0.0	0.0	0.0	0.0	0.0	0.0	0.0	9.4	1.6	0.0	0.0	0.0	0.0
Khwe	26	Namibia	KS	30.8	0.0	0.0	0.0	0.0	0.0	0.0	0.0	0.0	0.0	0.0	0.0	0.0	0.0	0.0	0.0	0.0	0.0	0.0	0.0	30.8	0.0	0.0	0.0	0.0	0.0
Bantu	8	South Africa	NC/Bantu	12.5	0.0	0.0	0.0	0.0	0.0	0.0	0.0	0.0	0.0	0.0	0.0	0.0	0.0	0.0	0.0	0.0	0.0	0.0	0.0	12.5	0.0	0.0	0.0	0.0	0.0
Europe																													
Northern Portuguese	50	Portugal	IE	10.0	0.0	0.0	0.0	0.0	4.0	0.0	0.0	0.0	0.0	0.0	0.0	4.0	0.0	0.0	2.0	0.0	0.0	0.0	0.0	0.0	0.0	0.0	0.0	0.0	0.0
Southern Portuguese	49	Portugal	IE	16.3	0.0	0.0	0.0	0.0	4.1	0.0	0.0	0.0	0.0	0.0	0.0	12.2	0.0	0.0	0.0	0.0	0.0	0.0	0.0	0.0	0.0	0.0	0.0	0.0	0.0
Pasiegos from Cantabria	56	Spain	IE	42.9	0.0	0.0	0.0	0.0	0.0	0.0	0.0	0.0	0.0	0.0	1.8	41.1	0.0	0.0	0.0	0.0	0.0	0.0	0.0	0.0	0.0	0.0	0.0	0.0	0.0
Asturians	90	Spain	IE	12.2	0.0	0.0	0.0	0.0	5.6	4.4	0.0	0.0	0.0	0.0	0.0	2.2	0.0	0.0	0.0	0.0	0.0	0.0	0.0	0.0	0.0	0.0	0.0	0.0	0.0
Southern Spaniards	62	Spain	IE	6.5	0.0	0.0	0.0	0.0	0.0	3.2	0.0	0.0	0.0	0.0	1.6	1.6	0.0	0.0	0.0	0.0	0.0	0.0	0.0	0.0	0.0	0.0	0.0	0.0	0.0
Spanish Basques	55	Spain	Basque	3.6	0.0	0.0	0.0	0.0	0.0	0.0	0.0	0.0	0.0	0.0	0.0	3.6	0.0	0.0	0.0	0.0	0.0	0.0	0.0	0.0	0.0	0.0	0.0	0.0	0.0
French	85	France	IE	8.2	0.0	0.0	0.0	0.0	3.5	0.0	1.2	0.0	0.0	0.0	0.0	3.5	0.0	0.0	0.0	0.0	0.0	0.0	0.0	0.0	0.0	0.0	0.0	0.0	0.0
French Basques	16	France	Basque	6.3	0.0	0.0	0.0	0.0	0.0	0.0	6.3	0.0	0.0	0.0	0.0	0.0	0.0	0.0	0.0	0.0	0.0	0.0	0.0	0.0	0.0	0.0	0.0	0.0	0.0
Corsicans	140	France	IE	6.4	0.0	0.0	0.0	0.0	4.3	0.0	0.0	0.0	0.0	0.0	0.7	0.0	0.0	1.4	0.0	0.0	0.0	0.0	0.0	0.0	0.0	0.0	0.0	0.0	0.0
Danish	35	Denmark	IE	2.9	0.0	0.0	0.0	0.0	2.9	0.0	0.0	0.0	0.0	0.0	0.0	0.0	0.0	0.0	0.0	0.0	0.0	0.0	0.0	0.0	0.0	0.0	0.0	0.0	0.0
Germans	77	Germany	IE	3.9	0.0	0.0	0.0	0.0	3.9	0.0	0.0	0.0	0.0	0.0	0.0	0.0	0.0	0.0	0.0	0.0	0.0	0.0	0.0	0.0	0.0	0.0	0.0	0.0	0.0
Northern Italians	80	Italy	IE	11.3	0.0	0.0	0.0	0.0	6.3	2.5	0.0	0.0	0.0	0.0	0.0	1.3	0.0	1.3	0.0	0.0	0.0	0.0	0.0	0.0	0.0	0.0	0.0	0.0	0.0
Central Italians	356	Italy	IE	12.9	0.0	0.0	0.0	0.0	5.3	2.0	0.3	0.0	0.0	0.3	0.3	0.8	0.0	3.9	0.0	0.0	0.0	0.0	0.0	0.0	0.0	0.0	0.0	0.0	0.0
Southern Italians	141	Italy	IE	15.6	0.7	0.0	0.0	0.0	8.5	1.4	0.7	0.0	0.0	0.0	0.0	1.4	0.0	2.8	0.0	0.0	0.0	0.0	0.0	0.0	0.0	0.0	0.0	0.0	0.0
Sicilians	153	Italy	IE	20.3	0.0	0.0	0.0	0.0	7.2	4.6	0.7	0.0	0.0	0.7	0.0	0.7	0.0	6.5	0.0	0.0	0.0	0.0	0.0	0.0	0.0	0.0	0.0	0.0	0.0
Sardinians	374	Italy	IE	8.3	0.8	0.0	0.0	0.3	1.1	0.8	0.3	0.0	0.0	1.1	0.3	0.3	0.0	3.5	0.0	0.0	0.0	0.0	0.0	0.0	0.0	0.0	0.0	0.0	0.0
Polish	40	Poland	IE	2.5	0.0	0.0	0.0	0.0	2.5	0.0	0.0	0.0	0.0	0.0	0.0	0.0	0.0	0.0	0.0	0.0	0.0	0.0	0.0	0.0	0.0	0.0	0.0	0.0	0.0
Slovenians	104	Slovenia	IE	2.9	0.0	0.0	0.0	0.0	2.9	0.0	0.0	0.0	0.0	0.0	0.0	0.0	0.0	0.0	0.0	0.0	0.0	0.0	0.0	0.0	0.0	0.0	0.0	0.0	0.0
Estonians	74	Estonia	U	5.4	0.0	0.0	0.0	0.0	4.1	0.0	0.0	0.0	0.0	0.0	0.0	0.0	0.0	0.0	0.0	0.0	0.0	0.0	0.0	0.0	0.0	0.0	0.0	0.0	0.0
Hungarians	106	Hungary	U	10.4	0.0	0.0	0.0	0.0	9.4	0.0	0.0	0.0	0.0	0.0	0.0	0.9	0.0	0.0	0.0	0.0	0.0	0.0	0.0	0.0	0.0	0.0	0.0	0.0	0.0
Romanians	30	Romania	IE	26.7	0.0	0.0	0.0	0.0	26.7	0.0	0.0	0.0	0.0	0.0	0.0	0.0	0.0	0.0	0.0	0.0	0.0	0.0	0.0	0.0	0.0	0.0	0.0	0.0	0.0
Macedonians	99	Macedonia	IE	18.2	0.0	0.0	0.0	0.0	18.2	0.0	0.0	0.0	0.0	0.0	0.0	0.0	0.0	0.0	0.0	0.0	0.0	0.0	0.0	0.0	0.0	0.0	0.0	0.0	0.0
Continental Greeks	32	Greece	IE	28.1	0.0	0.0	0.0	0.0	25.0	0.0	0.0	0.0	0.0	0.0	0.0	0.0	0.0	3.1	0.0	0.0	0.0	0.0	0.0	0.0	0.0	0.0	0.0	0.0	0.0
Bulgarians	112	Bulgaria	IE	22.3	0.0	0.0	0.0	0.0	21.4	0.0	0.0	0.0	0.0	0.0	0.0	0.0	0.9	0.0	0.0	0.0	0.0	0.0	0.0	0.0	0.0	0.0	0.0	0.0	0.0
Sephardic Bulgarians	20	Bulgaria	IE	5.0	0.0	0.0	0.0	0.0	0.0	0.0	0.0	0.0	0.0	0.0	0.0	0.0	0.0	5.0	0.0	0.0	0.0	0.0	0.0	0.0	0.0	0.0	0.0	0.0	0.0
Albanians	21	Albania	IE	33.3	0.0	0.0	0.0	0.0	33.3	0.0	0.0	0.0	0.0	0.0	0.0	0.0	0.0	0.0	0.0	0.0	0.0	0.0	0.0	0.0	0.0	0.0	0.0	0.0	0.0
Near East																													
Sephardic Turkish	19	Turkey	A	10.5	0.0	0.0	0.0	0.0	0.0	0.0	0.0	0.0	0.0	0.0	0.0	5.3	0.0	5.3	0.0	0.0	0.0	0.0	0.0	0.0	0.0	0.0	0.0	0.0	0.0
Istanbul Turkish	35	Turkey	A	17.1	0.0	0.0	0.0	0.0	2.9	5.7	0.0	0.0	0.0	0.0	0.0	5.7	0.0	2.9	0.0	0.0	0.0	0.0	0.0	0.0	0.0	0.0	0.0	0.0	0.0
Southwestern Turkish	40	Turkey	A	7.5	0.0	0.0	0.0	0.0	2.5	0.0	0.0	0.0	0.0	0.0	0.0	2.5	0.0	2.5	0.0	0.0	0.0	0.0	0.0	0.0	0.0	0.0	0.0	0.0	0.0
Northeastern Turkish	41	Turkey	A	2.4	0.0	0.0	0.0	0.0	0.0	0.0	0.0	0.0	0.0	0.0	0.0	2.4	0.0	0.0	0.0	0.0	0.0	0.0	0.0	0.0	0.0	0.0	0.0	0.0	0.0
Central Anatolian	61	Turkey	A	9.8	0.0	0.0	0.0	0.0	4.9	0.0	1.6	0.0	0.0	0.0	0.0	0.0	0.0	3.3	0.0	0.0	0.0	0.0	0.0	0.0	0.0	0.0	0.0	0.0	0.0
Southeastern Turkish	24	Turkey	A	8.3	0.0	0.0	0.0	0.0	4.2	0.0	0.0	0.0	0.0	0.0	0.0	0.0	0.0	4.2	0.0	0.0	0.0	0.0	0.0	0.0	0.0	0.0	0.0	0.0	0.0
Erzurum Turkish	25	Turkey	A	12.0	0.0	0.0	0.0	0.0	0.0	0.0	4.0	0.0	0.0	0.0	0.0	0.0	0.0	8.0	0.0	0.0	0.0	0.0	0.0	0.0	0.0	0.0	0.0	0.0	0.0
Turkish Cypriots	46	Turkey	A	23.9	0.0	0.0	0.0	0.0	10.9	2.2	0.0	0.0	0.0	0.0	0.0	8.7	0.0	2.2	0.0	0.0	0.0	0.0	0.0	0.0	0.0	0.0	0.0	0.0	0.0
Bedouins	28	Israel	AA/Semitic	14.3	0.0	0.0	0.0	0.0	0.0	3.6	0.0	0.0	0.0	0.0	0.0	3.6	0.0	7.1	0.0	0.0	0.0	0.0	0.0	0.0	0.0	0.0	0.0	0.0	0.0
Druze Arabs	28	Israel	AA/Semitic	14.3	0.0	0.0	0.0	0.0	10.7	0.0	0.0	0.0	0.0	0.0	0.0	0.0	0.0	3.6	0.0	0.0	0.0	0.0	0.0	0.0	0.0	0.0	0.0	0.0	0.0
Palestinians	29	Israel	AA/Semitic	13.8	0.0	0.0	0.0	0.0	3.4	6.9	0.0	0.0	0.0	0.0	0.0	0.0	0.0	3.4	0.0	0.0	0.0	0.0	0.0	0.0	0.0	0.0	0.0	0.0	0.0
Emiratis	41	United Arab Emirates	AA/Semitic	7.3	0.0	0.0	0.0	0.0	0.0	2.4	0.0	0.0	0.0	0.0	0.0	0.0	0.0	4.9	0.0	0.0	0.0	0.0	0.0	0.0	0.0	0.0	0.0	0.0	0.0
Omanites	13	Oman	AA/Semitic	15.4	0.0	0.0	0.0	0.0	0.0	7.7	0.0	0.0	0.0	0.0	0.0	0.0	0.0	7.7	0.0	0.0	0.0	0.0	0.0	0.0	0.0	0.0	0.0	0.0	0.0
Yemenites	94	Yemen	AA/Semitic	14.9	0.0	0.0	0.0	0.0	0.0	0.0	2.1	3.2	0.0	0.0	0.0	1.1	0.0	7.4	0.0	0.0	0.0	0.0	0.0	0.0	0.0	0.0	0.0	0.0	1.1

Exceptional cases of men who are M215 positive but M35 negative ("E-M215*") have been discovered so far in two Amharas of Ethiopia and one Yemeni. At least some of these men, perhaps all, are known since early 2011 to be in a rare sibling clade to E-M35, known as E-V16 or E-M281. The discovery of M281 was announced by Semino et al. (2002), who found it in two Ethiopian Oromo. Trombetta et al. (2011) found 5 more Ethiopian individuals and an equivalent SNP to M281, V16. It was in the 2011 paper that the family tree position (M215+/M35-) was discovered as described above. The E-M215 derivative, E-M35 is defined by the M35 SNP. 1 Turkmen individual from Jawzjan with a subclade defining mutation is referred to as E-M35*. As of June 2015, there is an increasingly complex tree structure which divides most men in E-M35 into two branches: E-V68 and E-Z827.

The most frequently described subclades are E-M78, a part of E-V68, and E-M81, which is a branch of E-Z827. These two subclades represent the largest proportion of the modern E-M215 population. E-M78 is found over most of the range where E-M215 is found excluding Southern Africa. E-M81 is found mainly in North Africa. E-M123 is less common but widely scattered, with significant populations in specific parts of the Horn of Africa, the Levant, Arabia, Iberia, and Anatolia. A new clade (E-V1515) was defined by Trombetta et al. 2015, which originated about 12 kya (95% CI 8.6–16.4) in eastern Africa where it is currently mainly distributed. This clade includes the E-V42, E-M293, E-V92 and E-V6 subclades, which were identified as E-M35 basal clades in a previous phylogeny.

Within E-M35, there are striking parallels between two haplogroups, E-V68 and E-V257. Both contain a lineage which has been frequently observed in Africa (E-M78 and E-M81, respectively) and a group of undifferentiated chromosomes that are mostly found in southern Europe. An expansion of E-M35 carriers, possibly from the Middle East as proposed by other authors, and split into two branches separated by the geographic barrier of the Mediterranean Sea, would explain this geographic pattern. However, the absence of E-V68* and E-V257* in the Middle East makes a maritime spread between northern Africa and southern Europe a more plausible hypothesis.

— Trombetta et al. (2011)

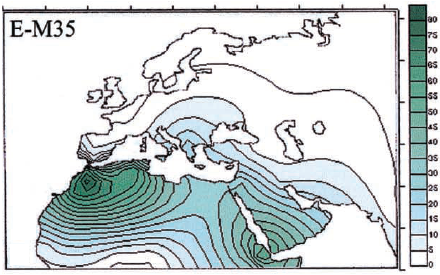
E-M35 distribution frequencies.

=== TMRCA of the major nodes in E-M35 ===
TMRCA (kya)	Trombetta 2015	YFull
E-M215	39	35,4
*E-M35	25	23,9
**E-V68	20	20
***E-M78	15	13
**E-Z827	?	23,6
***E-V257/L19	?	13,9
****E-M81	?	2,7
***E-Z830	20	19
****E-M34	?	15
****E-V1515	19	?

== Subclades ==
=== E-V68 (E1b1b1a) ===
E-V68, is dominated by its longer-known subclade E-M78. Three "E-V68*" individuals who are in E-V68 but not E-M78 have been reported in Sardinia, by Trombetta et al. (2011), when announcing the discovery of V68. The authors noted that because E-V68* was not found in the Middle Eastern samples, this appears to be evidence of maritime migration from Africa to southwestern Europe. E-M78 is a commonly occurring subclade, widely distributed in North Africa, the Horn of Africa, West Asia, (the Middle East and Near East) "up to Southern Asia", and all of Europe. The European distribution has a frequency peak centered in parts of the Balkans (up to almost 50% in some areas) and Sicily, and declining frequencies evident toward western, central, and northeastern Europe.

Based on genetic STR variance data, Cruciani et al. (2007) suggests that E-M78 originated in the region of Egypt and Libya. (Note: Cruciani et al. (2007) use the term Northeastern Africa to refer to Egypt and Libya, as shown in Table 1 of the study. Prior to Cruciani et al. (2007), Semino et al. (2004) East Africa as a possible place of origin of E-M78, based upon Ethiopian testing. This was because of the high frequency and diversity of E-M78 lineages in the region of Ethiopia. However, Cruciani et al. (2007) were able to study more data, including populations from North Africa who were not represented in the Semino et al. (2004) study, and found evidence that the E-M78 lineages which make up a significant proportion of some populations in that region, were relatively young branches (see E-V32 below). They therefore concluded that "Northeast Africa" was the likely place of origin of E-M78 based on "the peripheral geographic distribution of the most derived subhaplogroups with respect to northeastern Africa, as well as the results of quantitative analysis of UEP and microsatellite diversity". So according to Cruciani et al. (2007) E-M35, the parent clade of E-M78, originated in East Africa, subsequently spread to Northeast Africa, and then there was a "back migration" of E-M215 chromosomes that had acquired the E-M78 mutation. Cruciani et al. (2007) therefore note this as evidence for "a corridor for bidirectional migrations" between Northeast Africa (Egypt and Libya in their data) on the one hand and East Africa on the other. The authors believe there were "at least 2 episodes between 23.9–17.3 ky and 18.0–5.9 ky ago".) about 18,600 years ago (17,300 – 20,000 years ago). (Note: Cruciani et al. (2007) use two calculation methods for estimating the age of E-M78 which give very different results. For the main 18,600 years ago, the ASD method is used, while for a second "Ρ method", used as a check, gives 13.7kya with a Standard deviation of 2.3kya, but the difference between the two methods is only large for the age estimation of E-M78, not its subclades. The authors state that the big difference is "attributable to the relevant departure from a star-like structure because of repeated founder effects") Battaglia et al. (2008) describe Egypt as "a hub for the distribution of the various geographically localized M78-related subclades" and, based on archaeological data, they propose that the point of origin of E-M78 (as opposed to later dispersal from Egypt) may have been in a refugium which "existed on the border of present-day Sudan and Egypt, near Lake Nubia, until the onset of a humid phase around 8500 BC. The northward-moving rainfall belts during this period could have also spurred a rapid migration of Mesolithic foragers northwards in Africa, the Levant and ultimately onward to Asia Minor and Europe, where they each eventually differentiated into their regionally distinctive branches". Towards the south, Hassan et al. (2008) also explain evidence that some subclades of E-M78, specifically E-V12 and E-V22, "might have been brought to Sudan from North Africa after the progressive desertification of the Sahara around 6,000–8,000 years ago". And similarly, Cruciani et al. (2007) propose that E-M78 in Ethiopia, Somalia and surrounding areas, back-migrated to this region from the direction of Egypt after acquiring the E-M78 mutation.

Recently, E-M78 was dated by Trombetta et al. 2015. between 20,300 and 14,800 years ago.

==== Subclades of E-M78 ====
Listed here are the main subclades of M78 as of June 2015. Within the E-M78 subclade, Trombetta et al. 2015 allocated most of the former E-M78* chromosomes to three new distinct branches: E-V1083*, E-V1477 and E-V259. The first is a paragroup sister to clades E-V22 and E-V13. The mutation V1477 defines a new basal branch that has been observed only in one northern African sample. Finally, a sister clade of E-V12 defined by V264 includes E-V65 and V259, a new lineage distributed in central Africa.

- E-M78 (E1b1b1a1) North Africa, Horn of Africa, West Asia, Europe (formerly "E1b1b1a").
  - E-M78* Found in Morocco, southern Portugal, southern Spain and Iran (Tehran and Semnan provinces).
  - E-V1477 Found in Tunisian Jews.
  - E-V1083
    - E-V1083* Found only in Eritrea (1.1%) and Sardinia (0.3%).
    - E-V13 This is the most common subclade of E-M215 found in Europe. It is especially common in the Balkans.
    - E-V22. Concentrated in Northeast Africa and the Near East. Peaks among the Saho.
  - E-V1129
    - E-V12. Found in Egypt, Sudan, and Chad other places. Has an important subclade
      - E-V12* Most common lineage among Southern Egyptians (74.5%).
      - E-V32. Very common among Somalis, Tigre and Oromo populations.
    - E-V264
      - E-V259 Found in North Cameroon.
      - E-V65 Associated with North Africa, but also found in Sicily and also found in continental Italy.
  - E-M521 Not mentioned by Trombetta et al.2015. Found in two individuals in Greece by Battaglia et al. (2008) and in one individual from the Eastern Alpine region of Italy by Coia et al. (2013)

=== E-Z827 (E1b1b1b) ===
In human genetics, E-Z827, is the name of a major human Y-chromosome DNA haplogroup abundantly found in North Africa, particularly the Maghreb, and to a lesser extent in Horn of Africa, the Near East and Europe.

=== E-Z827 (E1b1b1b) ===
In human genetics, E-Z827, is the name of a major human Y-chromosome DNA haplogroup abundantly found in North Africa, particularly the Maghreb, and to a lesser extent in Horn of Africa, the Near East and Europe.

==== E-V257/E-L19 (E1b1b1b1) ====
E-V257* individuals in their samples who were E-V257, but not E-M81. A Borana from Kenya, a Marrakesh Berber, a Corsican, a Sardinian, a southern Spaniard and a Cantabrian. As mentioned above, Trombetta et al. (2011) propose that the absence of E-V257* in the Middle East (Yfull found a young one in Iranian Azerbaijan and a different young one in Armenia) makes a maritime movement from northern Africa to southern Europe the most plausible hypothesis so far to explain its distribution. Yfull lists 24 individuals, all of whom belong to a single branch that is 30% younger than their common ancestor with M81.

===== E-M81 =====
E-M81 is the most common subclade of haplogroup E-L19/V257. It is concentrated in the Maghreb, and is dominated by its E-M183 subclade. E-M183 is believed to have originated in the Northwest Africa and has an estimated age of 4700 ybp.

This haplogroup reaches a mean frequency of 61% in the Maghreb and 51% in North Africa, decreasing in frequency from approximately 80% to 100% in Berber populations, including Saharawis, to approximately 29% to the east of this range in Egypt. Because of its young age and prevalence among these groups and also others such as Mozabite, Middle Atlas, Kabyle and other Berber groups, it is sometimes referred to as a genetic "Berber marker". Pereira et al. (2010) report high levels amongst Tuareg in two Saharan populations – 77.8% near Gorom-Gorom, in Burkina Faso, and 81.8% from Gosi in Mali. There was a much lower frequency of 11.1% in the vicinity of Tanut in Niger. E-M81 is also quite common among Maghrebi Arabic-speaking groups. It is generally found at frequencies around 45% in coastal cities of Algeria and Tunisia (Jijel, Oran, Tizi Ouzou, Algiers, Tunis, Sousse).

In this key area from Egypt to the Atlantic Ocean, Solé-Morata et al. (2017) report a M183-SM001 pattern of decreasing microsatellite haplotype variation (implying greater lineage age in the former areas) from the Reguibat tribe in Oran and they found M183* (not SM001) in Iberia, Libya and Morocco. Arredi et al. (2004) however showed microsatellite variation decrease from East to West, accompanied by a substantial increasing frequency. At the eastern extreme of this core range, Kujanova et al. (2009) found M81 in 28.6% (10 out of 35 men) in el-Hayez in the Libyan Desert in Egypt.

Arredi et al. (2004) believe the pattern of distribution and variance to be consistent with the hypothesis of a "demic diffusion" from the East. There is no autochthonous presence of E-M81 in the Near East (there is one in Lebanon), indicating that M81 most likely emerged from its parent clade M35 either in North Africa, or possibly as far south as the Horn of Africa.

In Europe, E-M81 is widespread but rare, in the Iberian Peninsula shows an average frequency of 4% (45/1140) in the Iberian Peninsula with frequencies reaching 3.5% in Galicia, 4% in Western Andalusia and Northwest Castile. However this study includes 153 individuals from Majorca, Minorca and Ibiza islands as well as 24 individuals from Gascony which are not in the Iberian Peninsula. Without these 177 individuals, average for Iberian Peninsula is 4.1% (40/963), it is found at comparable levels to E-M78, with an average frequency of around 5%. Its frequencies are higher in the western half of the peninsula with frequencies reaching 8% in Extremadura and southern Portugal, 4% to 5% in Galicia, 5% in western Andalusia and 4% in northwest Castile and 9% to 17% in Cantabria. The highest frequencies of this clade found so far in Europe were observed in the Valles Pasiegos from Cantabria, ranging from 5.5% (8/45) to 41% (23/56). An average frequency of 8.28% (54/652) has also been reported in the Spanish Canary Islands with frequencies over 10% in the three largest islands of Tenerife (10.68%), Gran Canaria (11.54%) and Fuerteventura (13.33%).

E-M81 is also found in France, 2.70% (15/555) overall with frequencies surpassing 5% in Auvergne (5/89) and Île-de-France (5/91), 0,7% to 5,8% in Sardinia, approximately 2.12% overall in Sicily (but up to 7.14% in Piazza Armerina), and in very much lower frequency near Lucera (1.7%), in continental Italy, possibly due to ancient migrations during the Islamic, Roman, and Carthaginian empires. In a 2014 study by Stefania Sarno et al. with 326 samples from Cosenza, Reggio Calabria, Lecce and five Sicilian provinces, E-M81 shows an average frequency of 1.53%, but the typical Maghrebin core haplotype 13-14-30-24-9-11-13 has been found in only two out of the five E-M81 individuals. These results, along with the negligible contribution from North-African populations revealed by the admixture-like plot analysis, suggest only a marginal impact of trans-Mediterranean gene flows on the current SSI genetic pool.

As a result of its old world distribution, this subclade is found throughout Brazil 5.4% in Brazil (Rio de Janeiro), (Note: (6 out of 112), "The presence of chromosomes of North African origin (E3b1b-M81; Cruciani et al., 2004) can also be explained by a Portuguese but especially Italian-mediated influx, since this haplogroup reaches a frequency of 4.6% in Portugal and of 4.8% Italy, quite similar to the frequency found in Rio de Janeiro (4.4%) among European contributors." Silva et al. (2006)) and among Hispanic men from California and Hawaii 2.4%.

In smaller numbers, E-M81 men can be found in areas in contact with North Africa, both around the Sahara, in places like Sudan, and around the Mediterranean in places like Lebanon, Turkey, and amongst Sephardi Jews.

There are two recognized subclades of E-M81, although one is much more important than the other.

The E-M81 subclade has been found in ancient Guanche (Bimbapes) fossils excavated in Punta Azul, El Hierro, Canary Islands, which are dated to the 10th century (~44%).

====== E-M107 ======
Underhill (2000) found one example of E-M107 in Mali.

====== E-M183 ======
E-M183 is extremely dominant (more than 99%) within E-M81. Karafet et al. (2008) first described it as a subclade of E-M81. The known subclades of E-M183 include:

- E-M165 Underhill et al. (2000) found one example in Middle East.
- E-L351 Found in two related participants in The E-M35 Phylogeny Project.

==== E-Z830 (E1b1b1b2) ====
This is a recently discovered subclade which has not yet been included in most haplogroup trees, E-Z830 includes the confirmed subclades of E-M123, E-V1515 (E-M293, E-V42, E-V6, E-V92), and E-Z830*, and is a sibling clade to E-L19. Currently, the E-M35 phylogeny project] recognizes four distinct clusters of Z830* carriers, two of which are exclusively Jewish in origin. The remaining two are significantly smaller, and include scattered individuals in Germany, Spain, Latin America, Egypt, and Ethiopia.

==== E-PF2431 ====
E-PF2431 is a minor subclade of E-L19 mostly found in Europe, with smaller but notable frequencies in the Middle East/North Africa and sub-Saharan Africa. This haplogroup has been identified among Phoenicians from Motya, ancient Romans from Pompeii, and Medieval Arabs.

=== E-Z830 (E1b1b1b2) ===
This is a recently discovered subclade which has not yet been included in most haplogroup trees, E-Z830 includes the confirmed subclades of E-M123, E-V1515 (E-M293, E-V42, E-V6, E-V92), and E-Z830*, and is a sibling clade to E-L19. Currently, the E-M35 phylogeny project] recognizes four distinct clusters of Z830* carriers, two of which are exclusively Jewish in origin. The remaining two are significantly smaller, and include scattered individuals in Germany, Spain, Latin America, Egypt, and Ethiopia.

==== E-M123 ====
E-M123 is mostly known for its major subclade E-M34, which dominates this clade. (Note: As of 11 November 2008 for example, the E-M35 phylogeny project had records of four E-M123* tests, compared to 93 test results with E-M34.)

==== E-V1515 ====
A new clade (E-V1515) was defined by Trombetta et al. 2015, which originated about 12 kya (95% CI 8.6–16.4) in eastern Africa where it is currently mainly distributed. This clade includes all the sub-Saharan haplogroups ( E-V42, E-M293, E-V92, E-V6) reported as E-M35 basal clades in a previous phylogeny.

===== E-M293 =====
E-M293 is a subclade of E-V1515. It was first identified by ISOGG as the second clade within E-Z830. It was discovered before E-Z830, being announced in Henn et al. (2008), which associated it with the spread of pastoralism from East Africa into Southern Africa. So far high levels have been found in specific ethnic groups in Tanzania and Southern Africa. Highest were the Datooga (43%), Khwe (Kxoe) (31%), Burunge (28%), and Sandawe peoples (24%). Henn (2008) in their study also found two Bantu-speaking Kenyan males with the M293 mutation.

Other E-M215 subclades are rare in Southern Africa. The authors state "Without information about M293 in the Maasai, Hema, and other populations in Kenya, Sudan, and Ethiopia, we cannot pinpoint the precise geographic source of M293 with greater confidence. However, the available evidence points to present-day Tanzania as an early and important geographic locus of M293 evolution.". They also say that "M293 is only found in sub-Saharan Africa, indicating a separate phylogenetic history for M35.1 * (former) samples further north".

E-P72 appears in Karafet (2008). Trombetta et al. (2011) announced that this is a subclade of E-M293.

== E-V42 ==
Trombetta et al. (2011) announced the discovery of E-V42 in two Beta Israel persons. It was suggested that it may be restricted to the region around Ethiopia. However, further testing by commercial DNA testing companies confirmed many positive results for this subclade in Saudi Arabia, Kuwait and one person in Portugal who has a root from Arabia.[77] A 2026 preprint study by magd addin & Theyazan Mohammed Awad Harorh refined the phylogeny of E-V42, confirming its presence in southern Arabia with an estimated origin around 4,200 years ago during the Bronze Age, and also identified a downstream subclade (E-Y44734) in Iberia.

=== E-V6 ===
The E-V6 subclade of E-V1515 is defined by V6. Cruciani et al. (2004) identified a significant presence of these lineages in Ethiopia and also some in the neighboring Somalis. Among the Ethiopian and Somali samples, the highest were 14.7% among the Amhara and 16.7% among the Wolayta.

To the south, Tishkoff et al. (2007) identified one V6+ man in a sample of 35 Datooga of Tanzania. And further to the north, Dugoujon et al. (2009) identified another 6 men in a sample of 93 from the Siwa Oasis, which is a Berber population

=== E-V92 ===
Trombetta et al. (2011) announced the discovery of E-V92 in two Amharas. Like E-V6 and E-V42 it possibly only exists in the area of Ethiopia.

== Phylogenetics ==
=== Phylogenetic history ===
Prior to 2002, there were in academic literature at least seven naming systems for the Y-Chromosome phylogenetic tree. This led to considerable confusion. In 2002, the major research groups came together and formed the Y-Chromosome Consortium (YCC). They published a joint paper that created a single new tree that all agreed to use. Later, a group of citizen scientists with an interest in population genetics and genetic genealogy formed a working group to create an amateur tree aiming at being above all timely. The table below brings together all of these works at the point of the landmark 2002 YCC Tree. This allows a researcher reviewing older published literature to quickly move between nomenclatures.

YCC 2002/2008 (Shorthand)	(α)	(β)	(γ)	(δ)	(ε)	(ζ)	(η)	YCC 2002 (Longhand)	YCC 2005 (Longhand)	YCC 2008 (Longhand)	YCC 2010r (Longhand)	ISOGG 2006	ISOGG 2007	ISOGG 2008	ISOGG 2009	ISOGG 2010	ISOGG 2011	ISOGG 2012
E-P29	21	III	3A	13	Eu3	H2	B	E*	E	E	E	E	E	E	E	E	E	E
E-M33	21	III	3A	13	Eu3	H2	B	E1*	E1	E1a	E1a	E1	E1	E1a	E1a	E1a	E1a	E1a
E-M44	21	III	3A	13	Eu3	H2	B	E1a	E1a	E1a1	E1a1	E1a	E1a	E1a1	E1a1	E1a1	E1a1	E1a1
E-M75	21	III	3A	13	Eu3	H2	B	E2a	E2	E2	E2	E2	E2	E2	E2	E2	E2	E2
E-M54	21	III	3A	13	Eu3	H2	B	E2b	E2b	E2b	E2b1	-	-	-	-	-	-	-
E-P2	25	III	4	14	Eu3	H2	B	E3*	E3	E1b	E1b1	E3	E3	E1b1	E1b1	E1b1	E1b1	E1b1
E-M2	8	III	5	15	Eu2	H2	B	E3a*	E3a	E1b1	E1b1a	E3a	E3a	E1b1a	E1b1a	E1b1a	E1b1a1	E1b1a1
E-M58	8	III	5	15	Eu2	H2	B	E3a1	E3a1	E1b1a1	E1b1a1	E3a1	E3a1	E1b1a1	E1b1a1	E1b1a1	E1b1a1a1a	E1b1a1a1a
E-M116.2	8	III	5	15	Eu2	H2	B	E3a2	E3a2	E1b1a2	E1b1a2	E3a2	E3a2	E1b1a2	E1b1a2	E1ba12	removed	removed
E-M149	8	III	5	15	Eu2	H2	B	E3a3	E3a3	E1b1a3	E1b1a3	E3a3	E3a3	E1b1a3	E1b1a3	E1b1a3	E1b1a1a1c	E1b1a1a1c
E-M154	8	III	5	15	Eu2	H2	B	E3a4	E3a4	E1b1a4	E1b1a4	E3a4	E3a4	E1b1a4	E1b1a4	E1b1a4	E1b1a1a1g1c	E1b1a1a1g1c
E-M155	8	III	5	15	Eu2	H2	B	E3a5	E3a5	E1b1a5	E1b1a5	E3a5	E3a5	E1b1a5	E1b1a5	E1b1a5	E1b1a1a1d	E1b1a1a1d
E-M10	8	III	5	15	Eu2	H2	B	E3a6	E3a6	E1b1a6	E1b1a6	E3a6	E3a6	E1b1a6	E1b1a6	E1b1a6	E1b1a1a1e	E1b1a1a1e
E-M35	25	III	4	14	Eu4	H2	B	E3b*	E3b	E1b1b1	E1b1b1	E3b1	E3b1	E1b1b1	E1b1b1	E1b1b1	removed	removed
E-M78	25	III	4	14	Eu4	H2	B	E3b1*	E3b1	E1b1b1a	E1b1b1a1	E3b1a	E3b1a	E1b1b1a	E1b1b1a	E1b1b1a	E1b1b1a1	E1b1b1a1
E-M148	25	III	4	14	Eu4	H2	B	E3b1a	E3b1a	E1b1b1a3a	E1b1b1a1c1	E3b1a3a	E3b1a3a	E1b1b1a3a	E1b1b1a3a	E1b1b1a3a	E1b1b1a1c1	E1b1b1a1c1
E-M81	25	III	4	14	Eu4	H2	B	E3b2*	E3b2	E1b1b1b	E1b1b1b1	E3b1b	E3b1b	E1b1b1b	E1b1b1b	E1b1b1b	E1b1b1b1	E1b1b1b1a
E-M107	25	III	4	14	Eu4	H2	B	E3b2a	E3b2a	E1b1b1b1	E1b1b1b1a	E3b1b1	E3b1b1	E1b1b1b1	E1b1b1b1	E1b1b1b1	E1b1b1b1a	E1b1b1b1a1
E-M165	25	III	4	14	Eu4	H2	B	E3b2b	E3b2b	E1b1b1b2	E1b1b1b1b1	E3b1b2	E3b1b2	E1b1b1b2a	E1b1b1b2a	E1b1b1b2a	E1b1b1b2a	E1b1b1b1a2a
E-M123	25	III	4	14	Eu4	H2	B	E3b3*	E3b3	E1b1b1c	E1b1b1c	E3b1c	E3b1c	E1b1b1c	E1b1b1c	E1b1b1c	E1b1b1c	E1b1b1b2a
E-M34	25	III	4	14	Eu4	H2	B	E3b3a*	E3b3a	E1b1b1c1	E1b1b1c1	E3b1c1	E3b1c1	E1b1b1c1	E1b1b1c1	E1b1b1c1	E1b1b1c1	E1b1b1b2a1
E-M136	25	III	4	14	Eu4	H2	B	E3ba1	E3b3a1	E1b1b1c1a	E1b1b1c1a1	E3b1c1a	E3b1c1a	E1b1b1c1a1	E1b1b1c1a1	E1b1b1c1a1	E1b1b1c1a1	E1b1b1b2a1a1

==== Research publications ====
The following research teams per their publications were represented in the creation of the YCC Tree.

- α Jobling & Tyler-Smith (2000) and Kaladjieva (2001)
- β Underhill (2000)
- γ Hammer (2001)
- δ Karafet (2001)
- ε Semino (2000)
- ζ Su (1999)
- η Capelli (2001)

==== Phylogenetic trees ====
Cladogram with the main subclades:

- E1b1b (M215)
  - E1b1b1 (M35)
    - E1b1b1a (V68)
      - E-M78
        - E-V12
        - E-V65
        - E-V13
        - E-V22
      - E-V2729
    - E1b1b1b (Z827)
      - E-M81
      - E-M123
  - E1b1b2 (M281)

The following phylogenetic tree is based on the YCC 2008 tree and subsequent published research as summarized by ISOGG. It includes all known subclades as of June 2015 (Trombetta et al. 2015)

- E-M215 (E1b1b)
  - E-M215*. Rare or non-existent.
  - E-M35 (E1b1b1)
    - E-V68 (E1b1b1a)
      - E-V2009. Found in individuals in Sardinia and Morocco.
      - E-M78 (E1b1b1a1). North Africa, Horn of Africa, West Asia, Sicily. (Formerly "E1b1b1a".)
        - E-M78*
        - E-V1477. Found in Tunisian Jews.
        - E-V1083.
          - E-V1083*. Found only in Eritrea (1.1%) and Sardinia (0.3%).
          - E-V13
          - E-V22
        - E-V1129
          - E-V12
            - E-V12*
            - E-V32
          - E-V264
            - E-V259. Found in North Cameroon.
            - E-V65
              - E-CTS194
    - E-Z827 (E1b1b1b)
      - E-V257/L19 (L19, V257) – E1b1b1b1
        - E-PF2431
        - E-M81 (M81)
          - E-PF2546
            - E-PF2546*
            - E-CTS12227
              - E-MZ11
                - E-MZ12
            - E-A929
              - E-Z5009
                - E-Z5009*
                - E-Z5010
                - E-Z5013
                  - E-Z5013*
                  - E-A1152
              - E-A2227
                - E-A428
                - E-MZ16
              - E-PF6794
                - E-PF6794*
                - E-PF6789
                  - E-MZ21
                  - E-MZ23
                  - E-MZ80
              - E-A930
              - E-Z2198/E-MZ46
                - E-A601
                - E-L351
      - E-Z830 (Z830) – E1b1b1b2
        - E-M123 (M123)
          - E-M34 (M34)
            - E-M84 (M84)
              - E-M136 (M136)
            - E-M290 (M290)
            - E-V23 (V23)
            - E-L791 (L791, L792)
        - E-V1515. E-V1515 and its subclades are mainly restricted to eastern Africa.
          - E-V1515*
          - E-V1486
            - E-V1486*
            - E-V2881
              - E-V2881*
              - E-V1792
              - E-V92
            - E-M293 (M293)
              - E-M293*
              - E-P72 (P72)
              - E-V3065*
          - E-V1700
            - E-V42 (V42)
            - E-V1785
              - E-V1785*
              - E-V6 (V6)
    - E-V16/E-M281 (E1b1b2). Rare. Found in individuals in Ethiopia, Yemen and Saudi Arabia.

== See also ==
=== Genetics ===
- African admixture in Europe
- genetic genealogy
- Haplogroup D
- Haplogroup DE
- Haplogroup
- Haplotype
- Human Y-chromosome DNA haplogroup
- Molecular phylogenetics
- Paragroup
- Subclade
- Y-chromosome haplogroups in populations of the world
- Y-DNA haplogroups by ethnic group
- Y-DNA haplogroups in populations of Sub-Saharan Africa

=== Y-DNA E subclades ===
- Haplogroup E-L485
- Haplogroup E-M123
- Haplogroup E-M180
- Haplogroup E-M215
- Haplogroup E-M33
- Haplogroup E-M521
- Haplogroup E-M75
- Haplogroup E-M96
- Haplogroup E-P147
- Haplogroup E-P177
- Haplogroup E-P2
- Haplogroup E-V12
- Haplogroup E-V13
- Haplogroup E-V22
- Haplogroup E-M2
- Haplogroup E-V65
- Haplogroup E-V68
- Haplogroup E-Z820
- Haplogroup E-Z827

== Bibliography ==
- Adams, Susan M; Bosch, Elena; Balaresque, Patricia L.; Ballereau, Stéphane J.; Lee, Andrew C.; Arroyo, Eduardo; López-Parra, Ana M.; Aler, Mercedes; et al. (2008), "The Genetic Legacy of Religious Diversity and Intolerance: Paternal Lineages of Christians, Jews, and Muslims in the Iberian Peninsula", The American Journal of Human Genetics, 83 (6): 725–36, doi:10.1016/j.ajhg.2008.11.007, PMC 2668061, PMID 19061982
- Alvarez; Santos, Cristina; Montiel, Rafael; Caeiro, Blazquez; Baali, Abdellatif; Dugoujon, Jean-Michel; Aluja, Maria Pilar (2009), "Y-chromosome variation in South Iberia: Insights into the North African contribution", American Journal of Human Biology, 21 (3): 407–409, doi:10.1002/ajhb.20888, PMID 19213004, S2CID 7041905
- Arredi, B; Poloni, E; Paracchini, S; Zerjal, T; Fathallah, D; Makrelouf, M; Pascali, V; Novelletto, A; Tylersmith, C (2004), "A Predominantly Neolithic Origin for Y-Chromosomal DNA Variation in North Africa", American Journal of Human Genetics, 75 (2): 338–345, doi:10.1086/423147, PMC 1216069, PMID 15202071
- Badro, Danielle A.; Douaihy, Bouchra; Haber, Marc; Youhanna, Sonia C.; Salloum, Angélique; Ghassibe-Sabbagh, Michella; Johnsrud, Brian; Khazen, Georges; Matisoo-Smith, Elizabeth; Soria-Hernanz, David F.; Wells, R. Spencer; Tyler-Smith, Chris; Platt, Daniel E.; Zalloua, Pierre A. (2013), "Y-Chromosome and mtDNA Genetics Reveal Significant Contrasts in Affinities of Modern Middle Eastern Populations with European and African Populations", PLOS ONE, 8 (1: e54616) e54616, Bibcode:2013PLoSO...854616B, doi:10.1371/journal.pone.0054616, PMC 3559847, PMID 23382925
- Battaglia, Vincenza; Fornarino, Simona; Al-Zahery, Nadia; Olivieri, Anna; Pala, Maria; Myres, Natalie M; King, Roy J; Rootsi, Siiri; et al. (2008), "Y-chromosomal evidence of the cultural diffusion of agriculture in southeast Europe", European Journal of Human Genetics, 17 (6): 820–830, doi:10.1038/ejhg.2008.249, PMC 2947100, PMID 19107149
- Behar, Doron M.; Thomas, Mark G.; Skorecki, Karl; Hammer, Michael F.; Bulygina, Ekaterina; Rosengarten, Dror; Jones, Abigail L.; Held, Karen; et al. (October 2003), "Multiple Origins of Ashkenazi Levites: Y Chromosome Evidence for Both Near Eastern and European Ancestries", Am. J. Hum. Genet., vol. 73, no. 4, pp. 768–779, doi:10.1086/378506, PMC 1180600, PMID 13680527. Also at http://www.ucl.ac.uk/tcga/tcgapdf/Behar-AJHG-03.pdf and https://web.archive.org/web/20090304100321/http://www.familytreedna.com/pdf/400971.pdf
- Behar; Garrigan; Kaplan; Mobasher; Rosengarten (November 2004), "Contrasting patterns of Y chromosome variation in Ashkenazi Jewish and host non-Jewish European populations" (PDF), Hum. Genet., vol. 114, no. 4, pp. 354–365, doi:10.1007/s00439-003-1073-7, PMID 14740294, S2CID 10310338, archived from the original (PDF) on 2011-11-10
- Beleza, Sandra; Gusmao, Leonor; Lopes, Alexandra; Alves, Cintia; Gomes, Iva; Giouzeli, Maria; Calafell, Francesc; Carracedo, Angel; Amorim, Antonio (2006), "Micro-Phylogeographic and Demographic History of Portuguese Male Lineages", Annals of Human Genetics, 70 (2): 181–194, doi:10.1111/j.1529-8817.2005.00221.x, PMID 16626329, S2CID 4652154
- Bird, Steven (2007), "Haplogroup E3b1a2 as a Possible Indicator of Settlement in Roman Britain by Soldiers of Balkan Origin", Journal of Genetic Genealogy, 3 (2), archived from the original on 2016-04-22
- Bortolini; Thomas, Mark G.; Chikhi, Lourdes; Aguilar, Juan A.; Castro-De-Guerra, Dinorah; Salzano, Francisco M.; Ruiz-Linares, Andres (2004), "Ribeiro's typology, genomes, and Spanish colonialism, as viewed from Gran Canaria and Colombia" (PDF), Genetics and Molecular Biology, 27 (1): 1–8, doi:10.1590/S1415-47572004000100001
- Bosch, Elena; Calafell, Francesc; Comas, David; Oefner, Peter J.; Underhill, Peter A.; Bertranpetit, Jaume (2001), "High-resolution analysis of human Y-chromosome variation shows a sharp discontinuity and limited gene flow between north-western Africa and the Iberian Peninsula", Am J Hum Genet, 68 (4): 1019–1029, doi:10.1086/319521, PMC 1275654, PMID 11254456
- Bosch, E.; Calafell, F.; Gonzalez-Neira, A.; Flaiz, C.; Mateu, E.; Scheil, H.-G.; Huckenbeck, W.; Efremovska, L.; et al. (2006), "Paternal and maternal lineages in the Balkans show a homogeneous landscape over linguistic barriers, except for the isolated Aromuns", Annals of Human Genetics, 70 (4): 459–487, doi:10.1111/j.1469-1809.2005.00251.x, PMID 16759179, S2CID 23156886
- Cadenas; Zhivotovsky, Lev A; Cavalli-Sforza, Luca L; Underhill, Peter A; Herrera, Rene J (2007), "Y-chromosome diversity characterizes the Gulf of Oman", European Journal of Human Genetics, 16 (3): 1–13, doi:10.1038/sj.ejhg.5201934, PMID 17928816
- Capelli, Cristian; Redhead, Nicola; Abernethy, Julia K.; Gratrix, Fiona; Wilson, James F.; Moen, Torolf; Hervig, Tor; Richards, Martin; et al. (2003), "A Y Chromosome Census of the British Isles", Current Biology, 13 (11): 979–84, Bibcode:2003CBio...13..979C, doi:10.1016/S0960-9822(03)00373-7, hdl:20.500.11820/8acb01f3-a7c1-45f5-89de-b796266d651e, PMID 12781138 also at
- Caratti; Gino, S.; Torre, C.; Robino, C. (2009), "Subtyping of Y-chromosomal haplogroup E-M78 (E1b1b1a) by SNP assay and its forensic application", International Journal of Legal Medicine, 123 (4): 357–360, doi:10.1007/s00414-009-0350-y, PMID 19430804, S2CID 5657112
- Capelli, Cristian; Onofri, Valerio; Brisighelli, Francesca; Boschi, Ilaria; Scarnicci, Francesca; Masullo, Mara; Ferri, Gianmarco; Tofanelli, Sergio; et al. (2009), "Moors and Saracens in Europe: estimating the medieval North African male legacy in southern Europe", European Journal of Human Genetics, 17 (6): 848–852, doi:10.1038/ejhg.2008.258, PMC 2947089, PMID 19156170
- Cinnioğlu, Cengiz; King, Roy; Kivisild, Toomas; Kalfoglu, Ersi; Atasoy, Sevil; Cavalleri, Gianpiero L.; Lillie, Anita S.; Roseman, Charles C.; et al. (2004), "Excavating Y-chromosome haplotype strata in Anatolia", Hum Genet, 114 (2): 127–48, doi:10.1007/s00439-003-1031-4, PMID 14586639, S2CID 10763736
- Contu, Daniela; Morelli, Daniela; Santoni, Federico; Foster, Jamie W.; Francalacci, Paolo; Cucca, Francesco (2008), "Y-Chromosome Based Evidence for Pre-Neolithic Origin of the Genetically Homogeneous but Diverse Sardinian Population: Inference for Association Scans", PLOS ONE, 3 (1) e1430, Bibcode:2008PLoSO...3.1430C, doi:10.1371/journal.pone.0001430, PMC 2174525, PMID 18183308
- Cruciani, Fulvio; Santolamazza, Piero; Shen, Peidong; MacAulay, Vincent; Moral, Pedro; Olckers, Antonel; Modiano, David; Holmes, Susan (2002), "A Back Migration from Asia to Sub-Saharan Africa Is Supported by High-Resolution Analysis of Human Y-Chromosome Haplotypes", American Journal of Human Genetics, 70 (5): 1197–1214, Bibcode:2002AmJHG..70.1197C, doi:10.1086/340257, PMC 447595, PMID 11910562
- Cruciani; La Fratta; Santolamazza; Sellitto (May 2004), "Phylogeographic Analysis of Haplogroup E3b (E-M215) Y Chromosomes Reveals Multiple Migratory Events Within and Out Of Africa" (PDF), American Journal of Human Genetics, 74 (5): 1014–1022, doi:10.1086/386294, PMC 1181964, PMID 15042509, archived from the original (PDF) on 2008-06-26
- Cruciani; La Fratta; Torroni; Underhill; Scozzari (2006), "Molecular Dissection of the Y Chromosome Haplogroup E-M78 (E3b1a): A Posteriori Evaluation of a Microsatellite-Network-Based Approach Through Six New Biallelic Markers", Human Mutation, 27 (8): 831–2, doi:10.1002/humu.9445, PMID 16835895, S2CID 26886757
- Cruciani, F.; La Fratta, R.; Trombetta, B.; Santolamazza, P.; Sellitto, D.; Colomb, E. B.; Dugoujon, J.-M.; Crivellaro, F.; et al. (2007), "Tracing Past Human Male Movements in Northern/Eastern Africa and Western Eurasia: New Clues from Y-Chromosomal Haplogroups E-M78 and J-M12", Molecular Biology and Evolution, 24 (6): 1300–1311, doi:10.1093/molbev/msm049, PMID 17351267, archived from the original on October 10, 2017 Also see Supplementary Data.
- Di Gaetano; Cerutti, Francesca; Crobu, Carlo; Robino (2009), "Differential Greek and northern African migrations to Sicily are supported by genetic evidence from the Y chromosome", European Journal of Human Genetics, 17 (1): 91–99, doi:10.1038/ejhg.2008.120, PMC 2985948, PMID 18685561
- Dugoujon; Coudray; Torroni; Cruciani; Scozzari; Moral; Louali; Kossmann (2009), "The Berber and the Berbers: Genetic and linguistic diversities" (PDF), in d'Errico; Hombert (eds.), Becoming Eloquent Advances in the Emergence of Language, Human Cognition, and Modern Cultures, pp. 123–146, doi:10.1075/z.152.05ch4, ISBN 978-90-272-3269-4, archived from the original (PDF) on 2016-10-19
- Ehret, C.; Keita, SO; Newman, P (2004), "The Origins of Afroasiatic", Science, 306 (5702): 1680, doi:10.1126/science.306.5702.1680c, hdl:2022/21062, PMID 15576591, S2CID 8057990
- El-Sibai, Mirvat; Platt, Daniel E.; Haber, Marc; Xue, Yali; Youhanna, Sonia C.; Wells, R. Spencer; Izaabel, Hassan; Sanyoura, May F.; et al. (2009), "Geographical Structure of the Y-chromosomal Genetic Landscape of the Levant: A coastal-inland contrast", Annals of Human Genetics, 73 (6): 568–581, doi:10.1111/j.1469-1809.2009.00538.x, PMC 3312577, PMID 19686289
- Firasat; Khaliq, Shagufta; Mohyuddin, Aisha; Papaioannou, Myrto; Tyler-Smith, Chris; Underhill, Peter A; Ayub, Qasim (2006), "Y-chromosomal evidence for a limited Greek contribution to the Pathan population of Pakistan", European Journal of Human Genetics, 15 (1): 121–126, doi:10.1038/sj.ejhg.5201726, PMC 2588664, PMID 17047675
- Flores, Carlos; Maca-Meyer, Nicole; González, Ana M; Oefner, Peter J; Shen, Peidong; Pérez, Jose A; Rojas, Antonio; Larruga, Jose M; Underhill, Peter A (2004), "Reduced genetic structure of the Iberian peninsula revealed by Y-chromosome analysis: implications for population demography", European Journal of Human Genetics, 12 (10): 855–863, doi:10.1038/sj.ejhg.5201225, PMID 15280900, S2CID 16765118
- Flores; Maca-Meyer, Nicole; Larruga, Jose M.; Cabrera, Vicente M.; Karadsheh, Naif; Gonzalez, Ana M. (2005), "Isolates in a corridor of migrations: a high-resolution analysis of Y-chromosome variation in Jordan", J Hum Genet, 50 (9): 435–441, doi:10.1007/s10038-005-0274-4, PMID 16142507
- Francalacci, P.; Morelli, L.; Underhill, P.A.; Lillie, A.S.; Passarino, G.; Useli, A.; Madeddu, R.; Paoli, G.; et al. (2003), "Peopling of Three Mediterranean Islands (Corsica, Sardinia, and Sicily) Inferred by Y-Chromosome Biallelic Variability", American Journal of Physical Anthropology, 121 (3): 270–279, Bibcode:2003AJPA..121..270F, doi:10.1002/ajpa.10265, PMID 12772214
- Fregel, Rosa; Gomes, Verónica; Gusmão, Leonor; González, Ana M; Cabrera, Vicente M; Amorim, António; Larruga, Jose M (2009), "Demographic history of Canary Islands male gene-pool: replacement of native lineages by European", BMC Evolutionary Biology, 9 (1): 181, Bibcode:2009BMCEE...9..181F, doi:10.1186/1471-2148-9-181, PMC 2728732, PMID 19650893
- Gérard; Berriche, S; Aouizérate, A; Diéterlen, F; Lucotte, G (2006), "North African Berber and Arab influences in the western Mediterranean revealed by Y-chromosome DNA haplotypes", Human Biology, 78 (3): 307–316, doi:10.1353/hub.2006.0045, PMID 17216803, S2CID 13347549
- Gonçalves, R; Freitas, A; Branco, M; Rosa, A; Fernandes, AT; Zhivotovsky, LA; Underhill, PA; Kivisild, T; Brehm, A (2005), "Y-chromosome Lineages from Portugal, Madeira and Açores Record Elements of Sephardim and Berber Ancestry", Annals of Human Genetics, 69 (Pt 4): 443–454, doi:10.1111/j.1529-8817.2005.00161.x, hdl:10400.13/3018, PMID 15996172, S2CID 3229760
- Hammer (2003), "Human population structure and its effects on sampling Y chromosome sequence variation", Genetics, 164 (4): 1495–1509, doi:10.1093/genetics/164.4.1495, PMC 1462677, PMID 12930755
- Hassan, Hisham Y.; Underhill, Peter A.; Cavalli-Sforza, Luca L.; Ibrahim, Muntaser E. (2008), "Y-Chromosome Variation Among Sudanese: Restricted Gene Flow, Concordance With Language, Geography, and History" (PDF), American Journal of Physical Anthropology, 137 (3): 316–23, Bibcode:2008AJPA..137..316H, doi:10.1002/ajpa.20876, PMID 18618658, archived from the original (PDF) on 2009-03-04
- Henn, B. M.; Gignoux, C.; Lin, Alice A; Oefner, Peter J.; Shen, P.; Scozzari, R.; Cruciani, F.; Tishkoff, S. A.; Mountain, J. L.; Underhill, P. A. (2008), "Y-chromosomal evidence of a pastoralist migration through Tanzania to southern Africa", PNAS, 105 (31): 10693–8, Bibcode:2008PNAS..10510693H, doi:10.1073/pnas.0801184105, PMC 2504844, PMID 18678889. See comment on Dienekes blog, comment on the Spitoon blog and public release Archived 2021-05-08 at the Wayback Machine.
- Y-DNA Haplogroup E and its Subclades – 2011, International Society of Genetic Genealogy (ISOGG), 2011
- Jobling, M.A.; Tyler-Smith, C. (2000), "New uses for new haplotypes the human Y chromosome, disease and selection", Trends Genet., 16 (8): 356–362, doi:10.1016/S0168-9525(00)02057-6, PMID 10904265
- Karafet, T. M.; Mendez, F. L.; Meilerman, M. B.; Underhill, P. A.; Zegura, S. L.; Hammer, M. F. (May 2008), "New Binary Polymorphisms Reshape and Increase Resolution of the Human Y-Chromosomal Haplogroup Tree", Genome Research, 18 (5): 830–8, doi:10.1101/gr.7172008, PMC 2336805, PMID 18385274. Published online April 2, 2008. See also Supplementary Material.
- Keita, Shomarka (2008), "Geography, selected Afro-Asiatic families, and Y chromosome lineage variation", In Hot Pursuit of Language in Prehistory: Essays in the Four Fields of Anthropology: In Honor of Harold Crane Fleming, John Benjamins, ISBN 978-90-272-3252-6
- Keita, S. O. Y.; Boyce, A. J. (Anthony J.) (2005), "Genetics, Egypt, and History: Interpreting Geographical Patterns of Y Chromosome Variation", History in Africa, 32: 221–246, doi:10.1353/hia.2005.0013, S2CID 163020672
- King, R. J.; Özcan, S. S.; Carter, T.; Kalfoğlu, E.; Atasoy, S.; Triantaphyllidis, C.; Kouvatsi, A.; Lin, A. A.; et al. (2008), "Differential Y-chromosome Anatolian Influences on the Greek and Cretan Neolithic" (PDF), Annals of Human Genetics, 72 (2): 205–214, doi:10.1111/j.1469-1809.2007.00414.x, PMID 18269686, S2CID 22406638, archived from the original (PDF) on 2009-03-05
- King; Underhill (2002), "Congruent distribution of Neolithic painted pottery and ceramic figurines with Y-chromosome lineages", Antiquity, 76 (293): 707–14, doi:10.1017/S0003598X00091158, S2CID 160359661
- Kujanova; Pereira; Fernandes; Pereira; Cerný (2009), "Near Eastern Neolithic Genetic Input in a Small Oasis of the Egyptian Western Desert", American Journal of Physical Anthropology, 140 (2): 336–346, Bibcode:2009AJPA..140..336K, doi:10.1002/ajpa.21078, PMID 19425100
- Lacan, Marie; Keyser, Christine; Ricaut, François-Xavier; Brucato, Nicolas; Tarrús, Josep; Bosch, Angel; Guilaine, Jean; Crubézy, Eric; Ludes, Bertrand (2011), "Ancient DNA suggests the leading role played by men in the Neolithic dissemination", PNAS, 108 (45): 18255–9, Bibcode:2011PNAS..10818255L, doi:10.1073/pnas.1113061108, PMC 3215063, PMID 22042855
- Lancaster, Andrew (2009), "Y Haplogroups, Archaeological Cultures and Language Families: a Review of the Multidisciplinary Comparisons using the case of E-M35" (PDF), Journal of Genetic Genealogy, 5 (1), archived from the original (PDF) on 2016-05-06
- Luis, J; Rowold, D; Regueiro, M; Caeiro, B; Cinnioglu, C; Roseman, C; Underhill, P; Cavallisforza, L; Herrera, R (2004), "The Levant versus the Horn of Africa: Evidence for Bidirectional Corridors of Human Migrations" (PDF), American Journal of Human Genetics, 74 (3): 532–544, doi:10.1086/382286, PMC 1182266, PMID 14973781, archived from the original (PDF) on 2012-02-16. (Also see Errata)
- Maca-Meyer N, Sánchez-Velasco P, Flores C, Larruga JM, González AM, Oterino A, Leyva-Cobián F, et al. (2003), "Y Chromosome and Mitochondrial DNA Characterization of Pasiegos, a Human Isolate from Cantabria (Spain)", Annals of Human Genetics, 67 (Pt 4): 329–339, CiteSeerX 10.1.1.584.4253, doi:10.1046/j.1469-1809.2003.00045.x, PMID 12914567, S2CID 40355653.
- Martinez, Laisel; Underhill, Peter A; Zhivotovsky, Lev A; Gayden, Tenzin; Moschonas, Nicholas K; Chow, Cheryl-Emiliane T; Conti, Simon; Mamolini, Elisabetta; Cavalli-Sforza, L Luca; Herrera, Rene (April 1, 2007), "Paleolithic Y-haplogroup heritage predominates in a Cretan highland plateau", European Journal of Human Genetics, 15 (4): 485–493, doi:10.1038/sj.ejhg.5201769, ISSN 1018-4813, PMID 17264870
- Mendizabal, Isabel; Sandoval, Karla; Berniell-Lee, Gemma; Calafell, Francesc; Salas, Antonio; Martinez-Fuentes, Antonio; Comas, David (2008), "Genetic origin, admixture, and asymmetry in maternal and paternal human lineages in Cuba", BMC Evol. Biol., 8 (1) 213, Bibcode:2008BMCEE...8..213M, doi:10.1186/1471-2148-8-213, PMC 2492877, PMID 18644108
- Nebel, Almut; Filon, D; Brinkmann, B; Majumder, P; Faerman, M; Oppenheim, A (2001), "The Y Chromosome Pool of Jews as Part of the Genetic Landscape of the Middle East", American Journal of Human Genetics, 69 (5): 1095–1112, doi:10.1086/324070, PMC 1274378, PMID 11573163
- Onofri, Valerio; Alessandrini, Federica; Turchi, Chiara; Pesaresi, Mauro; Buscemi, Loredana; Tagliabracci, Adriano (2006), "Development of multiplex PCRs for evolutionary and forensic applications of 37 human Y chromosome SNPs" (PDF), Forensic Science International, 157 (1): 23–35, doi:10.1016/j.forsciint.2005.03.014, PMID 15896936
- Paracchini; Pearce, CL; Kolonel, LN; Altshuler, D; Henderson, BE; Tyler-Smith, C (2003), "A Y chromosomal influence on prostate cancer risk: the multi-ethnic cohort study", J Med Genet, 40 (11): 815–819, doi:10.1136/jmg.40.11.815, PMC 1735314, PMID 14627670
- Pelotti; Ceccardi, S; Lugaresi, F; Trane, R; Falconi, M; Bini, C; Willuweit, S; Roewer, L (2007), "Microgeographic genetic variation of Y chromosome in a population sample of Ravenna's area in the Emilia-Romagna region (North of Italy)", Forensic Science International: Genetics Supplement Series, 1 (1): 242–243, doi:10.1016/j.fsigss.2007.10.025
- Pereira, Luísa; Černý, Viktor; Cerezo, María; Silva, Nuno M; Hájek, Martin; Vašíková, Alžběta; Kujanová, Martina; Brdička, Radim; Salas, Antonio (2010), "Linking the sub-Saharan and West Eurasian gene pools: maternal and paternal heritage of the Tuareg nomads from the African Sahel" (PDF), European Journal of Human Genetics, 18 (8): 915–923, doi:10.1038/ejhg.2010.21, PMC 2987384, PMID 20234393, archived from the original (PDF) on 2013-05-28
- Peričic, M.; Lauc, LB; Klarić, IM; Rootsi, S; Janićijevic, B; Rudan, I; Terzić, R; Colak, I; et al. (2005), "High-resolution phylogenetic analysis of southeastern Europe traces major episodes of paternal gene flow among Slavic populations", Mol. Biol. Evol., vol. 22, no. 10, pp. 1964–75, doi:10.1093/molbev/msi185, PMID 15944443.
- Pontikos D. "Phylogeographic refinement of haplogroup E" http://dienekes.blogspot.ru/2015/07/phylogeographic-refinement-of.html
- Ramos-Luisa, E.; Blanco-Verea, A.; Brión, M.; Van Huffel, V.; Carracedo, A.; Sánchez-Diz, P. (2009), "Phylogeography of French male lineages (unpublished data 23rd International ISFG Congress)", Forensic Science International, 2: 439–441, doi:10.1016/j.fsigss.2009.09.026, S2CID 85134429
- Regueiro, M.; Cadenas, A.M.; Gayden, T.; Underhill, P.A.; Herrera, R.J. (2006), "Iran: Tricontinental Nexus for Y-Chromosome Driven Migration", Hum Hered, 61 (3): 132–143, doi:10.1159/000093774, PMID 16770078, S2CID 7017701
- Robino, C.; Crobu, F.; Gaetano, C.; Bekada, A.; Benhamamouch, S.; Cerutti, N.; Piazza, A.; Inturri, S.; Torre, C. (2008), "Analysis of Y-chromosomal SNP haplogroups and STR haplotypes in an Algerian population sample", Journal International Journal of Legal Medicine, 122 (3): 251–5, doi:10.1007/s00414-007-0203-5, PMID 17909833, S2CID 11556974
- Rosa, Alexandra; Ornelas, Carolina; Jobling, Mark A; Brehm, António; Villems, Richard (2007), "Y-chromosomal diversity in the population of Guinea-Bissau: a multiethnic perspective", BMC Evolutionary Biology, 7 (1): 124, Bibcode:2007BMCEE...7..124R, doi:10.1186/1471-2148-7-124, PMC 1976131, PMID 17662131
- Rosser, Z; Zerjal, T; Hurles, M; Adojaan, M; Alavantic, D; Amorim, A; Amos, W; Armenteros, M; et al. (2000), "Y-Chromosomal Diversity in Europe Is Clinal and Influenced Primarily by Geography, Rather than by Language", American Journal of Human Genetics, 67 (6): 1526–1543, doi:10.1086/316890, PMC 1287948, PMID 11078479, archived from the original on 2008-05-06
- Sanchez, Juan J; Hallenberg, Charlotte; Børsting, Claus; Hernandez, Alexis; Gorlin, RJ (2005), "High frequencies of Y chromosome lineages characterized by E3b1, DYS19-11, DYS392-12 in Somali males", European Journal of Human Genetics, 13 (7): 856–866, doi:10.1038/sj.ejhg.5201390, PMID 15756297. Published online 9 March 2005
- Scozzari, Rosaria; Cruciani, F; Pangrazio, A; Santolamazza, P; Vona, G; Moral, P; Latini, V; Varesi, L; et al. (2001), "Human Y-Chromosome Variation in the Western Mediterranean Area: Implications for the Peopling of the Region" (PDF), Human Immunology, 62 (9): 871–884, CiteSeerX 10.1.1.408.4857, doi:10.1016/S0198-8859(01)00286-5, PMID 11543889, archived from the original (PDF) on 2012-12-17
- Semino, O.; Passarino, G; Oefner, PJ; Lin, AA; Arbuzova, S; Beckman, LE; De Benedictis, G; Francalacci, P; et al. (2000), "The Genetic Legacy of Paleolithic Homo sapiens sapiens in Extant Europeans: A Y Chromosome Perspective" (PDF), Science, vol. 290, no. 5494, pp. 1155–59, Bibcode:2000Sci...290.1155S, doi:10.1126/science.290.5494.1155, PMID 11073453, archived from the original (PDF) on 2003-11-25.
- Semino; Santachiara-Benerecetti, A. Silvana; Falaschi, Francesco; Cavalli-Sforza, L. Luca; Underhill, Peter A. (2002), "Ethiopians and Khoisan share the deepest clades of the human Y-chromosome phylogeny" (PDF), Am J Hum Genet, vol. 70, no. 1, pp. 265–268, doi:10.1086/338306, PMC 384897, PMID 11719903, archived from the original (PDF) on 2006-03-15
- Semino, Ornella; Magri, Chiara; Benuzzi, Giorgia; Lin, Alice A.; Al-Zahery, Nadia; Battaglia, Vincenza; MacCioni, Liliana; Triantaphyllidis, Costas; et al. (2004), "Origin, Diffusion, and Differentiation of Y-Chromosome Haplogroups E and J: Inferences on the Neolithization of Europe and Later Migratory Events in the Mediterranean Area", American Journal of Human Genetics, vol. 74, no. 5, pp. 1023–1034, Bibcode:2004AmJHG..74.1023S, doi:10.1086/386295, PMC 1181965, PMID 15069642
- Shen, Peidong; Lavi, Tal; Kivisild, Toomas; Chou, Vivian; Sengun, Deniz; Gefel, Dov; Shpirer, Issac; Woolf, Eilon; et al. (2004), "Reconstruction of Patrilineages and Matrilineages of Samaritans and Other Israeli Populations From Y-Chromosome and Mitochondrial DNA Sequence Variation" (PDF), Human Mutation, vol. 24, no. 3, pp. 248–60, doi:10.1002/humu.20077, PMID 15300852, S2CID 1571356, archived from the original (PDF) on 2009-03-05
- Silva; Carvalho, Elizeu; Costa, Guilherme; Tavares, Lígia; Amorim, António; Gusmão, Leonor (2006), "Y-chromosome genetic variation in Rio de Janeiro population", American Journal of Human Biology, 18 (6): 829–837, doi:10.1002/ajhb.20567, PMID 17039481, S2CID 23778828
- Shlush; Behar, Doron M.; Yudkovsky, Guennady; Templeton, Alan; Hadid, Yarin; Basis, Fuad; Hammer, Michael; Itzkovitz, Shalev; Skorecki, Karl (2008), Gemmell, Neil John (ed.), "The Druze: A Population Genetic Refugium of the Near East", PLOS ONE, 3 (5) e2105, Bibcode:2008PLoSO...3.2105S, doi:10.1371/journal.pone.0002105, PMC 2324201, PMID 18461126
- Solé-Morata, Neus; García-Fernández, Carla; Urasin, Vadim; Bekada, Asmahan; Fadhlaoui-Zid, Karima; Zalloua, Pierre; Comas, David; Calafell, Francesc (21 November 2017), "Whole Y-chromosome sequences reveal an extremely recent origin of the most common North African paternal lineage E-M183 (M81)", Scientific Reports, 7 (1): 15941, Bibcode:2017NatSR...715941S, doi:10.1038/s41598-017-16271-y, ISSN 2045-2322, PMC 5698413, PMID 29162904
- Sykes, Bryan (2006), Blood of the Isles: Exploring the Genetic Roots of Our Tribal History, Bantam, ISBN 978-0-593-05652-3
- Tishkoff; Gonder; Henn; Mortensen; Knight (2007), "History of Click-Speaking Populations of Africa Inferred from mtDNA and Y Chromosome Genetic Variation", Mol Biol Evol, 24 (10): 2180–2195, doi:10.1093/molbev/msm155, PMID 17656633, archived from the original on 2011-10-10
- Thomas; Stumpf, M. P.H; Harke, H. (2006), "Evidence for an apartheid-like social structure in early Anglo-Saxon England" (PDF), Proceedings of the Royal Society B, 273 (1601): 2651–2657, doi:10.1098/rspb.2006.3627, PMC 1635457, PMID 17002951, archived from the original (PDF) on 2009-03-05
- Trombetta, Beniamino; Cruciani, Fulvio; Sellitto, Daniele; Scozzari, Rosaria (2011), MacAulay, Vincent (ed.), "A New Topology of the Human Y Chromosome Haplogroup E1b1 (E-P2) Revealed through the Use of Newly Characterized Binary Polymorphisms", PLOS ONE, 6 (1) e16073, Bibcode:2011PLoSO...616073T, doi:10.1371/journal.pone.0016073, PMC 3017091, PMID 21253605
- Underhill, Peter A.; Shen, Peidong; Lin, Alice A.; Jin, Li; Passarino, Giuseppe; Yang, Wei H.; Kauffman, Erin; Bonné-Tamir, Batsheva; et al. (2000), "Y chromosome sequence variation and the history of human populations", Nat Genet, vol. 26, no. 3, pp. 358–361, doi:10.1038/81685, PMID 11062480, S2CID 12893406
- Underhill; Passarino, G.; Lin, A. A.; Shen, P.; Mirazon Lahr, M.; Foley, R. A.; Oefner, P. J.; Cavalli-Sforza, L. L. (2001), "The phylogeography of Y chromosome binary haplotypes and the origins of modern human populations", Ann Hum Genet, vol. 65, no. Pt 1, pp. 43–62, doi:10.1046/j.1469-1809.2001.6510043.x, PMID 11415522, S2CID 9441236
- Underhill (2002), "Inference of Neolithic Population Histories using Y-chromosome Haplotypes", in Bellwood, Peter; Renfrew, A. Colin (eds.), Examining the farming/language dispersal hypothesis, Cambridge: McDonald Institute for Archaeological Research, ISBN 978-1-902937-20-5
- Underhill, Peter A.; Kivisild, Toomas (2007), "Use of Y Chromosome and Mitochondrial DNA Population Structure in Tracing Human Migrations", Annu. Rev. Genet., 41: 539–64, doi:10.1146/annurev.genet.41.110306.130407, PMID 18076332
- Weale, M. E.; Weiss, D. A.; Jager, R. F.; Bradman, N.; Thomas, M. G. (2002), "Y Chromosome Evidence for Anglo-Saxon Mass Migration" (PDF), Mol. Biol. Evol., vol. 19, no. 7, pp. 1008–1021, doi:10.1093/oxfordjournals.molbev.a004160, PMID 12082121, archived from the original (PDF) on 2005-10-29.
- Weale; Shah, T; Jones, AL; Greenhalgh, J; Wilson, JF; Nymadawa, P; Zeitlin, D; Connell, BA; et al. (September 1, 2003), "Rare Deep-Rooting Y Chromosome Lineages in Humans: Lessons for Phylogeography", Genetics, vol. 165, no. 1, pp. 229–234, doi:10.1093/genetics/165.1.229, PMC 1462739, PMID 14504230
- Wood; Stover; Ehret; Destro-Bisol (2005), "Contrasting patterns of Y chromosome and mtDNA variation in Africa: evidence for sex-biased demographic processes", European Journal of Human Genetics, 13 (7): 867–876, doi:10.1038/sj.ejhg.5201408, PMID 15856073
- Y Chromosome Consortium "YCC" (2002), "A Nomenclature System for the Tree of Human Y-Chromosomal Binary Haplogroups", Genome Research, vol. 12, no. 2, pp. 339–348, doi:10.1101/gr.217602, PMC 155271, PMID 11827954
- Zalloua, Pierre A.; Xue, Yali; Khalife, Jade; Makhoul, Nadine; Debiane, Labib; Platt, Daniel E.; Royyuru, Ajay K.; Herrera, Rene J.; et al. (2008), "Y-Chromosomal Diversity in Lebanon Is Structured by Recent Historical Events", American Journal of Human Genetics, 82 (4): 873–882, doi:10.1016/j.ajhg.2008.01.020, PMC 2427286, PMID 18374297
- Zalloua, Pierre A.; Platt, Daniel E.; El Sibai, Mirvat; Khalife, Jade; Makhoul, Nadine; Haber, Marc; Xue, Yali; Izaabel, Hassan; et al. (2008), "Identifying Genetic Traces of Historical Expansions: Phoenician Footprints in the Mediterranean", The American Journal of Human Genetics, 83 (5): 633–642, doi:10.1016/j.ajhg.2008.10.012, PMC 2668035, PMID 18976729
- Zerjal (1999), The use of Y-chromosomal DNA variation to investigate population history; in Papiha SS, Deka R, Chakraborty R (eds): Genomic diversity: applications in human population genetics, Kluwer Academic/Plenum Publishers, pp. 91–101
- Zhao; Khan, Faisal; Borkar, Minal; Herrera, Rene; Agrawal, Suraksha (2009), "Presence of three different paternal lineages among North Indians: A study of 560 Y chromosomes", Annals of Human Biology, 36 (1): 1–14, doi:10.1080/03014460802558522, PMC 2755252, PMID 19058044

=== Sources for conversion tables ===
- Capelli, Cristian; Wilson, James F.; Richards, Martin; Stumpf, Michael P.H.; et al. (February 2001). "A Predominantly Indigenous Paternal Heritage for the Austronesian-Speaking Peoples of Insular Southeast Asia and Oceania". The American Journal of Human Genetics. 68 (2): 432–443. doi:10.1086/318205. PMC 1235276. PMID 11170891.
- Hammer, Michael F.; Karafet, Tatiana M.; Redd, Alan J.; Jarjanazi, Hamdi; et al. (1 July 2001). "Hierarchical Patterns of Global Human Y-Chromosome Diversity". Molecular Biology and Evolution. 18 (7): 1189–1203. doi:10.1093/oxfordjournals.molbev.a003906. PMID 11420360.
- Kaladjieva, Luba; Calafell, Francesc; Jobling, Mark A; Angelicheva, Dora; et al. (February 2001). "Patterns of inter- and intra-group genetic diversity in the Vlax Roma as revealed by Y chromosome and mitochondrial DNA lineages". European Journal of Human Genetics. 9 (2): 97–104. doi:10.1038/sj.ejhg.5200597. PMID 11313742. S2CID 21432405.
- Karafet, Tatiana; Xu, Liping; Du, Ruofu; Wang, William; et al. (September 2001). "Paternal Population History of East Asia: Sources, Patterns, and Microevolutionary Processes". The American Journal of Human Genetics. 69 (3): 615–628. Bibcode:2001AmJHG..69..615K. doi:10.1086/323299. PMC 1235490. PMID 11481588.
- Semino, O.; Passarino, G; Oefner, PJ; Lin, AA; et al. (2000), "The Genetic Legacy of Paleolithic Homo sapiens sapiens in Extant Europeans: A Y Chromosome Perspective", Science, 290 (5494): 1155–9, Bibcode:2000Sci...290.1155S, doi:10.1126/science.290.5494.1155, PMID 11073453
- Su, Bing; Xiao, Junhua; Underhill, Peter; Deka, Ranjan; et al. (December 1999). "Y-Chromosome Evidence for a Northward Migration of Modern Humans into Eastern Asia during the Last Ice Age". The American Journal of Human Genetics. 65 (6): 1718–1724. Bibcode:1999AmJHG..65.1718S. doi:10.1086/302680. PMC 1288383. PMID 10577926.
- Underhill, Peter A.; Shen, Peidong; Lin, Alice A.; Jin, Li; et al. (November 2000). "Y chromosome sequence variation and the history of human populations". Nature Genetics. 26 (3): 358–361. doi:10.1038/81685. PMID 11062480. S2CID 12893406.
