= Haplogroup E-Z827 =

Human Y-chromosome DNA haplogroup

- Possible time of origin: 24,100 BP
- Coalescence age: 23,500 BP
- Possible place of origin: Northern Africa,Middle East
- Ancestor: E-M35
- Descendants: E-L19, E-Z830
- Defining mutations: Z827

E-Z827, also known as E1b1b1b, is a major human Y-chromosome DNA haplogroup. It is the parent lineage to the E-Z830 and E-V257 subclades, and defines their common phylogeny. The former is predominantly found in the Middle East; the latter is most frequently observed in North Africa, with its E-M81 subclade observed among the ancient Guanche natives of the Canary Islands. E-Z827 is also found at lower frequencies in Europe, and in isolated parts of Southeast Africa.

== Subclades of E-Z827 and Distribution ==
=== Family Tree ===
The following phylogeny is based on the YCC 2008 tree and subsequent published research as summarized by ISOGG.

- E-Z827 (Z827) - E1b1b1b
  - E-V257/L19 (L19, V257) - E1b1b1b1
    - E-PF2431 (PF2431)
      - E-PF2438
        - E-Y10561
          - E-FGC18981
            - E-FGC38527
            - E-Y35933
            - E-FGC18960
              - E-Y33020
              - E-FGC18958
        - E-PF2440
          - E-PF2471
            - E-BY9805
    - E-M81 (M81)
      - E-M81*
      - E-PF2546
        - E-PF2546*
        - E-CTS12227
          - E-MZ11
            - E-MZ12
        - E-A929
          - E-Z5009
            - E-Z5009*
            - E-Z5010
            - E-Z5013
              - E-Z5013*
              - E-A1152
          - E-A2227
            - E-A428
            - E-MZ16
          - E-PF6794
            - E-PF6794*
            - E-PF6789
              - E-MZ21
              - E-MZ23
              - E-MZ80
          - E-A930
          - E-Z2198/E-MZ46
            - E-A601
            - E-L351
  - E-Z830 (Z830) - E1b1b1b2
    - E-M123 (M123)
      - E-M34 (M34)
        - E-M84 (M84)
          - E-M136 (M136)
        - E-M290 (M290)
        - E-V23 (V23)
        - E-L791 (L791, L792)
    - E-V1515
      - E-V1515*
      - E-V1486
        - E-V1486*
        - E-V2881
          - E-V2881*
          - E-V1792
          - E-V92
        - E-M293 (M293)
          - E-M293*
          - E-P72 (P72)
          - E-V3065*
      - E-V1700
        - E-V42 (V42)
        - E-V1785
          - E-V1785*
          - E-V6 (V6)

=== E-V257/L19 (E1b1b1b1) ===
- "E-V257/L19*" individuals were found in published samples who were E-V257/L19, but not E-M81. several Middle Easterners and northafricans, a Corsican, a Sardinian, a Borana from Kenya, a southern Spaniard and a Cantabrian.

Within E-M35, there are striking parallels between two haplogroups, E-V68 and E-V257. Both contain a lineage which has been frequently observed in North Africa (E-M78 and E-M81, respectively) and a group of undifferentiated chromosomes that are mostly found in southern Europe. An expansion of E-M35 carriers, possibly from the Middle East as proposed by other authors, and split into two branches separated by the geographic barrier of the Mediterranean Sea, would explain this geographic pattern. However, the absence of E-V68* and E-V257* in the Middle East makes a maritime spread between northern Africa and southern Europe a more plausible hypothesis.

—

==== E-PF2431 ====
PF2431 is the sister branch of M81 which was discovered in Paolo Francalacci (2011). Previously, it was designated L19*/V257*. This mutation has been discovered in North Africa (in Souss in Morocco, in central and eastern Algeria, West Nile in Egypt), the Sahel (Chad, Gambia), Western Europe (United Kingdom (Derbyshire), Germany, Switzerland, Spain, Italy) and Near Eastern (Turkey, Karabakh and Urmia). It would have formed 13800 years ago and is thought to originate from the "green" Sahara. Its TMRCA is estimated at 10600 years by yfull.

Archeology unearthed the remains of a member of the Hungarian conquering elite was analyzed from branch E-FGC19010, it had been discovered in Sandorfalva in Hungary and is dated to the second half of the tenth century. A skeleton was discovered at the Monastery of San Pietro, Villa Magna in Italy, whose DNA belongs to the same branch and lived around 1180CE. Scientists have examined the DNA of a mass grave of victims of the bubonic plague in Ellwangen in Germany, this one dates from the 16th century and belongs to another branch E-FGC18981.

==== E-M81 ====
E-L19/V257's dominant sub-clade E-M81 is thought to have originated in the Near East of Africa 13,000 years ago and to have become dominant during Chartage's expansion or an origin in the area of the northwest of Africa 7,000 years ago, however all Yfull members are M183 and have a TMRCA of just 4200 years ago.

E-M81 is the most common subclade of haplogroup E-L19/V257. It is concentrated in MENA, and is dominated by its E-M183 subclade. E-M183 is believed to have originated in the Near East or Northwest of Africa, and has an estimated age of 4200 ybp.

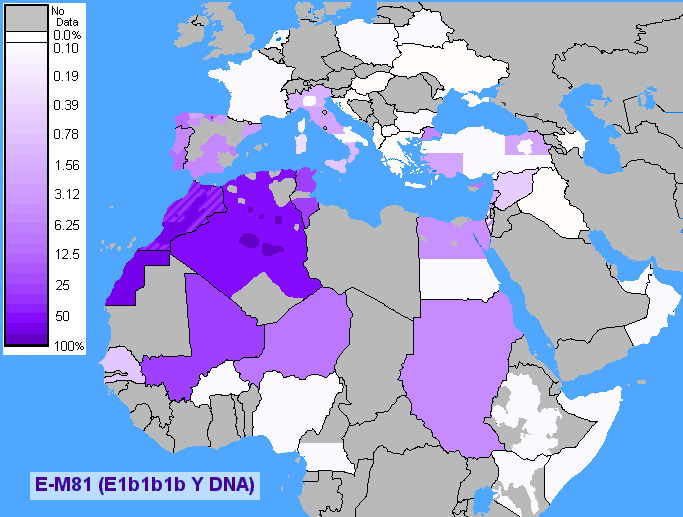
Regional distribution for haplogroup E-M81.

The E-M183 sub haplogroup reaches a mean frequency of 42% in North Africa. It decreases in frequency from 100% among some populations to approximately 28.6% to the east of this range in Egypt. The E-M81 subclade is predominant among North-African Berber speaking populations and Maghrebi Arabs. In Tunisia, it reached 100% frequency among a sample of Arabs from Zriba, 89.5% in Andalusians (Qalaat-al-Andalous) and 100% in Berbers from Chenini-Douiret, Jradou and Takrouna. It is generally found at frequencies around 45% in coastal cities of the Maghreb (Oran, Tunis, Algiers). It is also prevalent among other Berber populations and reaches frequency of 72.4% in Marrakesh Berbers, 80% in Mozabite, and 71% in Middle Atlas Berbers (Moyen). It also reaches high levels (77.8%) among the Tuareg population inhabiting the Sahara in Burkina Faso, near Gor it reaches a much lower frequency of 11.1% in the vicinity of Tanut in the Republic of Niger.

In this key area from Egypt to the Atlantic Ocean, report a pattern of decreasing STR haplotype variation (implying decreasing lineage age in those areas) from East to West (but reports West to East for M183), accompanied by a substantial increasing frequency. At the eastern extreme of this core range, M81 is found in 28.6% (10 out of 35 men) in El-Hayez in the Western desert in Egypt

The pattern of distribution and variance to be consistent with the hypothesis of a post Paleolithic "demic diffusion" from the Middle East. The ancestral lineage of E-M81 in their hypothesis could have been linked with the spread of Neolithic food-producing technologies from the Fertile Crescent via the Nile, although pastoralism rather than agriculture. E-M81 and possibly proto-Afroasiatic language may have been carried either all the way from Asia, or they may represent a "local contribution to the North African Neolithic transition".

The E-M81 subclade has been found in ancient Guanche (Bimbapes) fossils excavated in Punta Azul, El Hierro, Canary Islands, which are dated to the 10th century (~44%). Also found in ifri n'ammar that makes the Northwest African origin the likely origin of where it expanded, and not the Middle East.

===== Europe =====
In Europe, E-M81 has a widespread distribution at very low frequencies but is common mostly in the Iberian Peninsula, where unlike in the rest of Europe, shows an average frequency of 4.3% (49/1140) in the Iberian Peninsula with frequencies reaching 4% and 9% in two separate surveys of Galicia, 10% in Western Andalusia and Northwest Castile. However this study also includes 153 individuals from Majorca, Minorca and Ibiza islands as well as 24 individuals from Gascony which are not in the Iberian Peninsula. Without these 177 individuals, real average for Iberian Peninsula is 4.9% (47/963) it is more common than E-M78, with an average frequency around 5%. Its frequencies are higher in the western half of the peninsula with frequencies reaching 8% in Extremadura and South Portugal, 4% in one study and 9% in another in Galicia, 10% in Western Andalusia and Northwest Castile and 9% to 17% in Cantabria. The highest frequencies of this clade found so far in Europe were observed in the Pasiegos from Cantabria, ranging from 18% (8/45) to 41% (23/56). An average frequency of 8.28% (54/652) has also been reported in the Spanish Canary Islands with frequencies over 10% in the three largest islands of Tenerife (10.68%), Gran Canaria (11.54%) and Fuerteventura (13.33%).

E-M81 is also found in other parts of Europe, such as Britain – especially Wales and Scotland – and France, where it has an overall incidence of 2.7% (15/555), with frequencies surpassing 5.0% in Auvergne (5/89) and Île-de-France (5/91). E-M81 was also observed in Italy with frequencies of 0,7% to 5,8% in Sardinia, approximately 2.12% overall in Sicily (but up to 7.14% in Piazza Armerina), and in very much lower frequency near Lucera (1.7%), in continental Italy, possibly due to ancient migrations during the Islamic, Roman, and Carthaginian empires. In a 2014 study by Stefania Sarno et al. with 326 samples from Cosenza, Reggio Calabria, Lecce and five Sicilian provinces, E-M81 shows an average frequency of 1.53%, but the typical Maghrebin core haplotype 13-14-30-24-9-11-13 has been found in only two out of the five E-M81 individuals. These results, along with the negligible contribution from North-African populations revealed by the admixture-like plot analysis, suggest only a marginal impact of trans-Mediterranean gene flows on the current SSI genetic pool.

===== Latin America =====
As a result of Spanish and Portuguese colonization of the Americas, this sub-clade is found throughout Latin America, for example 6.1% in Cuba, (8 out of 132), 5.4% in Brazil (Rio de Janeiro) (6 out of 112), "The presence of chromosomes of North African origin (E3b1b-M81; can also be explained by a Portuguese-mediated influx, since this haplogroup reaches a frequency of 5.6% in Portugal, quite similar to the frequency found in Rio de Janeiro (5.4%) among European contributors." and among Hispanic men from California and Hawaii 2.4% (7 out of 295),

===== Others =====
In smaller numbers, E-M81 men can be found in areas in contact with the Maghreb, both around the Sahara, in places like Sudan, and around the Mediterranean in places like Lebanon, Turkey, and amongst Sephardic Jews.

===== Distribution =====
The following gives a summary of most of the studies which specifically tested for E-M81, showing where its distribution is greater than 1% in Europe, North Africa, the Middle East and Latin America.

Country/Region	Sampling	n	%E-M81	Source
Mauretania	Arabs	17	94	
Algeria	Arabs	60	80	
Tunisia	Arabs from Zriba	32	100	
Tunisia	Arabs from Djerba	47	93.7	
Algeria	Mozabite Berbers	67	86.6	
Algeria	Mozabite Berbers	20	80	
Algeria	Oran	102	45.1	
Algeria	Algiers	35	42.9	
Algeria	Kabyles from Tizi Ouzou	19	47.4	
Algeria	Arabs and Berbers	156	44.2	
Algeria	Zenata	35	48.6	
Brazil	Rio de Janeiro	112	5.4	
Burkina Faso	Tuaregs	38	77.8	
Canary Islands	Fuerteventura	75	13.3	
Canary Islands	Gran Canaria	78	11.5	
Canary Islands	Tenerife	178	10.7	
Canary Islands	Lanzarote	97	6.2	
Canary Islands	La Palma	85	5.9	
Canary Islands	Gomera	92	4.4	
Canary Islands	Hierro	47	2.1	
Cuba		132	6.1	
Cyprus	Turkish Cypriots	46	8.7	
Egypt	Northern Egyptians	21	4.8	
Egypt	Western Desert	35	28.6	
Egypt		147	8.2	
Egypt	Arabs	370	11.8	
France		85	3.5	
France	Auvergne	89	5.6	
France	Île-de-France	91	5.5	
France	Nord-Pas-de-Calais	68	4.4	
France	Provence-Alpes-Côte d'Azur	45	2.2	
France	Midi-Pyrénées	67	1.5	
France	Béarnais	56	1.8	
France	Bigorre	44	2.3	
Iberia	Spain, Portugal	655	5.2	
Iberia	Spain, Portugal	1140	4.3	
Israel	Bedouins	28	3.6	
Italy	Central Italians	89	2.2	
Italy	Northern Italians	67	1.5	
Italy	East Campania	84	1.2	
Italy	Lucera	60	1.7	
Italy	Peninsular Italy	915	0.3	
Italy	Sicily	236	2.1	
Italy	Sicilians	136	0.7	
Italy	Sardinians	367	0.3	
Italy	Sardinia	1204	5.8	
Jordan	Arabs	101	4	
Lebanon	Arabs	104	1.9	
Lebanon	Arabs	914	1.2	
Libya	Tuaregs	47	48.9	
Libya	Arabs	215	35.9	
Libya	Arabs and Berbers	83	45.7	
Mauritania	Arabs and Berbers	189	55.5	
Morocco	Marrakesh Berbers	29	72.4	
Morocco	Southern Moroccan Berbers	187	98.5	
Morocco	Moyen Atlas Berbers	69	71	
Morocco	Moroccan Arabs	54	31.5	
Morocco	Marrakesh (Amizmiz Valley)	33	84.8	
Morocco	Northern Moroccans (Beni Snassen)	67	79.1	
Morocco	Northern Moroccans (Rhiraya)	54	79.6	
Morocco	Immigrants resident in Italy	51	54.9	
Morocco	Arabs and Berbers	221	65	
Morocco	Arabs and Berbers	760	67.3	
Morocco	Saharawi	29	76	
Niger	Tuaregs	22	9.1	
Niger	Tuaregs	31	11.1	
North Africa	Sahara	89	59.6	
North Africa	Algeria, Tunisia	202	39.1	
Portugal	North	109	5.5	
Portugal	South	49	12.2	
Portugal	North	50	4	
Portugal	South	78	7.7	
Portugal	North	60	3.3	
Portugal		303	5.6	
Portugal	North	101	6	
Portugal	Center	102	4.9	
Portugal	South	100	6	
Portugal	Madeira	129	5.4	
Portugal	Açores	121	5	
Portugal		657	5.6	
Portugal	Entre Douro e Minho	228	6.6	
Portugal	Tras os Montes	64	3.1	
Portugal	Beira Litoral	116	5.2	
Portugal	Beira Interior	58	5.3	
Portugal	Estremadura	43	4.6	
Portugal	Lisboa e Setubal	62	6.5	
Portugal	Alentejo	65	7.7	
Portugal	Coruche	64	9.4	
Portugal	Pias	46	4.3	
Portugal	Alcacer do Sal	21	4.8	
Portugal	Tras-os-Montes (Jews)	57	5.3	
Portugal	Tras-os-Montes (Non Jews)	30	10	
Somalia		201	1.5	
Spain	Pasiegos from Cantabria	19	36.8	
Spain	Pasiegos from Cantabria	56	41.1	
Spain	Pasiegos from Cantabria	45	17.8	
Spain	Spanish Basques	55	3.6	
Spain	Asturians	90	2.2	
Spain	Southern Spaniards	62	1.6	
Spain	Castile, NorthWest	100	10	
Spain	Andalucia, West	73	9.6	
Spain	Galicia	19	10.5	
Spain	Galicia	292	4.1	
Spain	Galicia	88	9.1	
Spain	Galicia	44	9.1	
Spain	Galicia	164	9.1	
Spain	Extremadura	52	7.7	
Spain	Valencia	73	4.1	
Spain	Castile, NorthEast	31	3.2	
Spain	Aragon	34	2.9	
Spain	Minorca	37	2.7	
Spain	Andalucia, East	95	2.1	
Spain	Majorca	62	1.6	
Spain	Castile, La Mancha	63	1.6	
Spain	Catalonia	80	1.3	
Spain	Catalonia	111	3.6	
Spain	Cantabria	161	13	
Spain	Malaga	26	11.5	
Spain	Cantabria	70	8.6	
Spain	Cordoba	27	7.4	
Spain	Valencia	31	6.5	
Spain	Valencia	59	5.1	
Spain	Almeria	36	5.6	
Spain	Leon	60	5	
Spain	Castile	21	4.8	
Spain	Seville	155	4.5	
Spain	Huelva	22	4.5	
Spain	Basques	45	2.2	
Spain	Huelva	167	3	
Spain	Granada	250	3.6	
Spain	Pedroches Valley	68	1.5	
Spain	Andalucia	94	2.1	
Spain	Zamora	235	5.5	
Tunisia	Tunis	148	37.9	
Tunisia	Immigrants resident in Italy	52	32.7	
Tunisia	Berbers from Bou Omrane	40	87.5	
Tunisia	Berbers from Bou Saad	40	92.5	
Tunisia	Arabs from Djerba	46	60.8	
Tunisia	Berbers from Djerba	47	76.6	
Tunisia	Berbers from Chenini–Douiret	27	100	
Tunisia	Berbers from Sened	35	65.7	
Tunisia	Arabs from Jradou	32	100	
Tunisia	Andalusians from Zaghouan	32	40.6	
Tunisia	Cosmopolitan Tunis	33	54.4	
Tunisia	Arabs	601	62.7	
Turkey	Istanbul Turkish	35	5.7	
Turkey	Sephardi Turkish	19	5.3	
Turkey	Southwestern Turkish	40	2.5	
Turkey	Northeastern Turkish	41	2.4	
Egypt	Berbers	93	1.1	

=== E-Z830 (E1b1b1b2) ===
A recently confirmed sub-clade of E-Z827, Z830, includes the confirmed sub-clades of E-M123, E-M293, and E-V42, and is a sibling clade to E-L19. Currently, the E-M35 phylogeny project recognizes four distinct clusters of Z830* carriers, two of which are exclusively Jewish in origin. The remaining two are significantly smaller, and include scattered individuals in Germany, Spain, Latin America, Egypt, and Ethiopia.

==== E-M123 ====
E-M123 is mostly known for its major subclade E-M34, which dominates this clade.

==== E-V1515 ====
A new clade (E-V1515) was defined by Trombetta et al. 2015, which originated about 12 kya (95% CI 8.6-16.4) in eastern Africa where it is currently mainly distributed. This clade includes all the sub-Saharan haplogroups (E-V42, E-M293, E-V92, E-V6) reported as E-M35 basal clades in a previous phylogeny.

We observed the highest frequency and diversity of this haplogroup in the northern part of the Horn of Africa (present day Eritrea and northern Ethiopia), where the majority of the deepest E-V1515 subhaplogroups and paragroups were found. In the southern part of the Horn (southern Ethiopia, Somalia and northern Kenya), haplogroup E-V1515 is almost exclusively represented by the recent (3.5 ka; 95% CI: 1.7–5.9 ka) subhaplogroup E-V1486. Further south, in southern Kenya and southern Africa, a single E-V1486 terminal clade, known as E-M293 (Henn et al. 2008), was found (fig. 3). This phylogeographic pattern is strongly suggestive of human movements from the northern part of the Horn to the Ethiopian/Kenyan borders between 12 ka (the coalescence of E-V1515) and 3.5 ka (the coalescence of E-V1486), and from here toward southern Africa across the equatorial belt in more recent times.

Multiple instances of commercially observed E-V1515 have also been detected in Arabia.

===== E-M293 =====
E-M293 is a subclade of E-V1515. It was identified by ISOGG as the second clade within E-Z830. It was discovered before E-Z830 and is associated with the spread of pastoralism from Eastern Africa by South Cushites into Southern Africa. So far high levels have been found in specific ethnic groups in Tanzania and Southern Africa. Highest were the Datog (43%), Khwe (Kxoe) (31%), Burunge (28%), and Sandawe (24%). Two Bantu-speaking Kenyan males were found with the M293 mutation. Other E-M215 subclades are rare in Southern Africa. The authors state...

Without information about M293 in the Maasai, Hema, and other populations in Kenya, Sudan, and Ethiopia, we cannot pinpoint the precise geographic source of M293 with greater confidence. However, the available evidence points to present-day Tanzania as an early and important geographic locus of M293 evolution.

They also say that "M293 is only found in sub-Saharan Africa, indicating a separate phylogenetic history for M35.1 * (former) samples further north". E-P72. This is a subclade of E-M293.

== E-V42 ==
E-V42 was discovered in two Ethiopian Jews. It was suggested that it may be restricted to the region around Ethiopia. However, further testing by commercial DNA testing companies confirmed positive results for this subclade in Arabia as well.

Subsequent research has refined the phylogeny of this lineage, placing its most recent common ancestor (TMRCA) in the Bronze Age, approximately 4,200 years before present, with a pronounced concentration in the Arabian Peninsula. A limited presence in the Horn of Africa suggests prehistoric gene flow across the Red Sea, while the downstream subclade E-Y44734 is restricted to Iberia (Portugal) within the available dataset, indicating a westward dispersal.

=== E-V6 ===
The E-V6 subclade of E-V1515 is defined by V6 and has been identified a significant presence of these lineages in Ethiopia, and also some in the neighboring Somali population. Among the Ethiopian and Somali samples, the highest were 14.7% among the Ethiopian Amhara, and 16.7% among the Ethiopian Wolayta.

=== E-V92 ===
E-V92 was discovered in two Ethiopian Amhara. Like E-V6 and E-V42 it possibly only exists in the area of Ethiopia.

== Phylogenetics ==
=== Phylogenetic History ===
Prior to 2002, there were in academic literature at least seven naming systems for the Y-Chromosome Phylogenetic tree. This led to considerable confusion. In 2002, the major research groups came together and formed the Y-Chromosome Consortium (YCC). They published a joint paper that created a single new tree that all agreed to use. Later, a group of citizen scientists with an interest in population genetics and genetic genealogy formed a working group to create an amateur tree aiming at being above all timely. The table below brings together all of these works at the point of the landmark 2002 YCC Tree. This allows a researcher reviewing older published literature to quickly move between nomenclatures.

YCC 2002/2008 (Shorthand)	(α)	(β)	(γ)	(δ)	(ε)	(ζ)	(η)	YCC 2002 (Longhand)	YCC 2005 (Longhand)	YCC 2008 (Longhand)	YCC 2010r (Longhand)	ISOGG 2006	ISOGG 2007	ISOGG 2008	ISOGG 2009	ISOGG 2010	ISOGG 2011	ISOGG 2012
E-P29	21	III	3A	13	Eu3	H2	B	E*	E	E	E	E	E	E	E	E	E	E
E-M33	21	III	3A	13	Eu3	H2	B	E1*	E1	E1a	E1a	E1	E1	E1a	E1a	E1a	E1a	E1a
E-M44	21	III	3A	13	Eu3	H2	B	E1a	E1a	E1a1	E1a1	E1a	E1a	E1a1	E1a1	E1a1	E1a1	E1a1
E-M75	21	III	3A	13	Eu3	H2	B	E2a	E2	E2	E2	E2	E2	E2	E2	E2	E2	E2
E-M54	21	III	3A	13	Eu3	H2	B	E2b	E2b	E2b	E2b1	-	-	-	-	-	-	-
E-P2	25	III	4	14	Eu3	H2	B	E3*	E3	E1b	E1b1	E3	E3	E1b1	E1b1	E1b1	E1b1	E1b1
E-M2	8	III	5	15	Eu2	H2	B	E3a*	E3a	E1b1	E1b1a	E3a	E3a	E1b1a	E1b1a	E1b1a	E1b1a1	E1b1a1
E-M58	8	III	5	15	Eu2	H2	B	E3a1	E3a1	E1b1a1	E1b1a1	E3a1	E3a1	E1b1a1	E1b1a1	E1b1a1	E1b1a1a1a	E1b1a1a1a
E-M116.2	8	III	5	15	Eu2	H2	B	E3a2	E3a2	E1b1a2	E1b1a2	E3a2	E3a2	E1b1a2	E1b1a2	E1ba12	removed	removed
E-M149	8	III	5	15	Eu2	H2	B	E3a3	E3a3	E1b1a3	E1b1a3	E3a3	E3a3	E1b1a3	E1b1a3	E1b1a3	E1b1a1a1c	E1b1a1a1c
E-M154	8	III	5	15	Eu2	H2	B	E3a4	E3a4	E1b1a4	E1b1a4	E3a4	E3a4	E1b1a4	E1b1a4	E1b1a4	E1b1a1a1g1c	E1b1a1a1g1c
E-M155	8	III	5	15	Eu2	H2	B	E3a5	E3a5	E1b1a5	E1b1a5	E3a5	E3a5	E1b1a5	E1b1a5	E1b1a5	E1b1a1a1d	E1b1a1a1d
E-M10	8	III	5	15	Eu2	H2	B	E3a6	E3a6	E1b1a6	E1b1a6	E3a6	E3a6	E1b1a6	E1b1a6	E1b1a6	E1b1a1a1e	E1b1a1a1e
E-M35	25	III	4	14	Eu4	H2	B	E3b*	E3b	E1b1b1	E1b1b1	E3b1	E3b1	E1b1b1	E1b1b1	E1b1b1	removed	removed
E-M78	25	III	4	14	Eu4	H2	B	E3b1*	E3b1	E1b1b1a	E1b1b1a1	E3b1a	E3b1a	E1b1b1a	E1b1b1a	E1b1b1a	E1b1b1a1	E1b1b1a1
E-M148	25	III	4	14	Eu4	H2	B	E3b1a	E3b1a	E1b1b1a3a	E1b1b1a1c1	E3b1a3a	E3b1a3a	E1b1b1a3a	E1b1b1a3a	E1b1b1a3a	E1b1b1a1c1	E1b1b1a1c1
E-M81	25	III	4	14	Eu4	H2	B	E3b2*	E3b2	E1b1b1b	E1b1b1b1	E3b1b	E3b1b	E1b1b1b	E1b1b1b	E1b1b1b	E1b1b1b1	E1b1b1b1a
E-M107	25	III	4	14	Eu4	H2	B	E3b2a	E3b2a	E1b1b1b1	E1b1b1b1a	E3b1b1	E3b1b1	E1b1b1b1	E1b1b1b1	E1b1b1b1	E1b1b1b1a	E1b1b1b1a1
E-M165	25	III	4	14	Eu4	H2	B	E3b2b	E3b2b	E1b1b1b2	E1b1b1b1b1	E3b1b2	E3b1b2	E1b1b1b2a	E1b1b1b2a	E1b1b1b2a	E1b1b1b2a	E1b1b1b1a2a
E-M123	25	III	4	14	Eu4	H2	B	E3b3*	E3b3	E1b1b1c	E1b1b1c	E3b1c	E3b1c	E1b1b1c	E1b1b1c	E1b1b1c	E1b1b1c	E1b1b1b2a
E-M34	25	III	4	14	Eu4	H2	B	E3b3a*	E3b3a	E1b1b1c1	E1b1b1c1	E3b1c1	E3b1c1	E1b1b1c1	E1b1b1c1	E1b1b1c1	E1b1b1c1	E1b1b1b2a1
E-M136	25	III	4	14	Eu4	H2	B	E3ba1	E3b3a1	E1b1b1c1a	E1b1b1c1a1	E3b1c1a	E3b1c1a	E1b1b1c1a1	E1b1b1c1a1	E1b1b1c1a1	E1b1b1c1a1	E1b1b1b2a1a1

==== Original Research Publications ====
The following research teams per their publications were represented in the creation of the YCC Tree.

- α
- β
- γ
- δ
- ε
- ζ
- η

== See also ==
- Semitic people
- Arabs
- Israelites
- Berber People

=== Genetics ===
- African admixture in Europe
- Genetic genealogy
- Haplogroup D (Y-DNA)
- Haplogroup DE (Y-DNA)
- Haplogroup
- Haplotype
- Human Y-chromosome DNA haplogroup
- Molecular phylogenetics
- Paragroup
- Subclade
- Y-chromosome haplogroups in populations of the world
- Y-DNA haplogroups by ethnic group
- Y-DNA haplogroups in populations of the Near East
- Y-DNA haplogroups in populations of North Africa

=== Y-DNA E Subclades ===
- Haplogroup E-L485 (Y-DNA)
- Haplogroup E-M123 (Y-DNA)
- Haplogroup E-M180 (Y-DNA)
- Haplogroup E-M215 (Y-DNA)
- Haplogroup E-M33 (Y-DNA)
- Haplogroup E-M521 (Y-DNA)
- Haplogroup E-M75 (Y-DNA)
- Haplogroup E-M96 (Y-DNA)
- Haplogroup E-P147 (Y-DNA)
- Haplogroup E-P177 (Y-DNA)
- Haplogroup E-P2 (Y-DNA)
- Haplogroup E-V12 (Y-DNA)
- Haplogroup E-V42 (Y-DNA)
- Haplogroup E-V13 (Y-DNA)
- Haplogroup E-V22 (Y-DNA)
- Haplogroup E-V38 (Y-DNA)
- Haplogroup E-V65 (Y-DNA)
- Haplogroup E-V68 (Y-DNA)
- Haplogroup E-Z820 (Y-DNA)
- Haplogroup E-Z827 (Y-DNA)
