= Ifri Oudadane =

Moroccan archeological site

- Location of Ifri Oudadane
- 35°12′54.3″N 3°15′15.2″W
- Location: Northeast Morocco

Ifri Oudadane is an archaeological site in the northeastern Rif region of Morocco. It is located on the southwestern coast of the Cape Three Forks on the Mediterranean Sea, and is one of the most important sites in the northwestern Maghreb region of Africa. Discovered during road construction, the site consists of a fairly large rock shelter above the modern coastline, the site has been excavated since 2006 by a team of Moroccan and German archaeologists under the direction of Jörg Linstädter. Although much is known about the transition of humans from hunter gatherer groups to food production in Europe and the Middle East, much of North Africa has not been researched. Ifri Oudadane is one of the first of such sites in North Africa. Dated to between 11000 and 5700 years BP, the site contains evidence that documents the shift of local inhabitants from hunter-gatherer groups to food producers. Such elements of change found at Ifri Oudadane include evidence of animal husbandry, domestication of legumes, and decoration of pottery. The site is known to contain the earliest dated crop in Northern Africa, a lentil.

== Research methods ==
Research at Ifri Oudadane was started in 2006 by the “Eastern Rif” project, a Moroccan-German mixed team. Consisting of the National Institute of Archaeology and Heritage (INSAP) of Morocco, the German Commission for Archeology of External European Affairs (KAAK), and the University of Cologne. Archaeologists dug about 2.5 meters (8.2 ft) deep into the soil inside of the rock shelter. During the 2006 and 2007 digging seasons, excavated material was separated and cleared through screens of various sizes. Starting in 2010, flotation analysis was used to get a better understanding of organic materials, including pollen and foodstuffs. In addition, black carbon (BC) analysis was used to gain a deeper understanding of the history of fire at Ifri Oudadane. This method entails using an acid to oxidize the carbon into benzene polycarboxylic acids. A variety of information can be gathered from this method, including the composition of fires and at which temperature they burned.

== Occupation periods ==
Archaeologists have determined through stratigraphy that the site was occupied during two distinct periods of time.

=== Epipaleolithic: (20-10.5k BP) ===
The Epipaleolithic time period takes up a meter thick layer of the stratigraphy inside of the rock shelter. Archaeologists were able to obtain a date from this period by the seeds of chamaerops plants found in the deposit. The oldest of these have been dated to 9028±41 BP while the most recent were from 7632±29 BP. Through the reconstruction of carbon recovered from sediments it is likely that the area was forested at the time. Stone tool fragments and bone fragments of various wild animals (e.g. Barbary sheep) were found. Lithics of this time period are few in number and many are unspecific flakes, as opposed to specified tools.

==== Environment ====
The environment of the Mediterranean coast in the epipaleolithic has been explored through charcoal and pollen analysis administered by the University of the Basque Country in 2011. Epipaleolithic pollen levels are dominated by arboreal species. In total, 60.5%–72.1% of all pollen recovered in epipaleolithic levels was arboreal in nature. Dominant species included Kermes oak, alder, and willow. Shrub vegetation makes up the majority of the remaining pollen, such as Olea europaea (olives), Pistacia lentiscus, and Myrtus communis. Furthermore, the evidence of an arboreal dominated environment is supported by examining charcoal left at the site.

=== Early Neolithic (8-5k BP) ===
The early Neolithic occupation of Ifri Oudadane is represented by a 1.5 meter (4.9 ft) thick deposit. This time period of the site can be subdivided into three distinct layers, early Neolithic A, B, and C.

==== Environment ====
Early Neolithic pollen analysis shows a significant decrease in arboreal species, as compared to the epipaleolithic, down to somewhere between about 30% and 19%. The shrubs from the epipaleolithic tend to stay the same, while others increased; notably species in the Aster, Boraginacae, and Chichorioideae varieties. An increase of pollen from the family Poaceae is also present, implying a grassier environment. Throughout the three sub periods of the early neolithic, a general increase in the use of the species Pistacia and Juniperus for firewood, and shifting away from hardwood.

==== Early Neolithic A (ENA) ====
ENA deposits are only found in the northeast corner of the site, consisting of charcoal and ash layers. The ENA deposit marks the first occurrence of pottery in the rock shelter. This pottery is decorated with impressed marks. More importantly than that pottery though was the discovery of a domesticated lentil dating back to 7.327±81 BP. Tools found in the ENA layer include large notched stone blades and bone needles/awls. In 2010, flotation analysis found evidence of not only various cereals, lentils, and legumes but also that of wild boar and domesticated sheep and goats.

==== Early Neolithic B (ENB) ====
Compared to the ENA, the ENB phase is very similar. The main change is stylistic differences on pottery. Cardium style pottery is still the main type. Use of comb impressions in pottery begin to appear. The bone industry became more specified, containing needles, spatulas, and even a ring. Further widening of species of plant remains is evident during the ENB, including barley, peas, and wheat. Herbivore coprolites were also found in the soil as evidence of the penning of animals in the shelter. This layer is considered to be the main occupation phase of the site.

==== Early Neolithic C (ENC) ====
The ENC is the final and most thin layer of the stratigraphy. It contains very few artifacts. Dating on these artifacts have produced a date range of around 6.6 to 6.4 KBP. This is potentially a sign of the rock shelter falling out of use and perhaps becoming a seasonal shelter instead of a full-time location. It is thought that a general trend of climatic and environmental degradation brought forth the end of human occupation at Ifri Oudadane and many sites within Northern Africa.

== Pottery at Ifri Oudadane ==
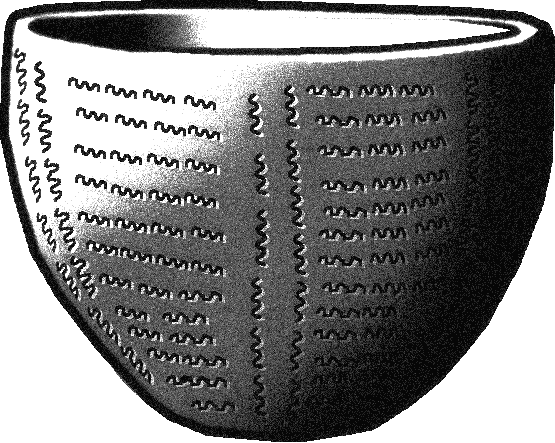
An example of Cardium pottery or Cardial ware, present at Ifri Oudadane.

Ifri Oudadane offers insight into the first pottery of northwest Africa. Pottery in the ENA sections of the rock shelter are of Cardium variety, using horizontal and vertical bands of various impressions. Pottery from this time period is narrow, oval shaped, with a pointed base. As the pottery begins to date more recently, there are two divisions during the ENB. The earlier subsection (7.1-6.9 KYA) is characterized by a closed necked(see amphora)/straight rimmed and open neck/segmented rim pottery. The later subsection of the ENB (6.8-6.3 KYA) pots are ovoid in nature with closed style with outward bending rims. Both assemblages of pottery from the ENB have decorated handles with various vertical and horizontal decoration. Later pottery from the ENB are decorated with stamps (similar to modern rubber stamps instead of individual cardium shell impressions. The pottery of the ENC occupation (6.6-6.3KYA) and the later neolithic period (≈5.7 KYA) are fairly similar. They consist of closed ovoid forms only and have similar decorations, although use of a herringbone motif is found on early neolithic only.

== Significance of research ==
Although much is known about the prehistoric development of agriculture, coined the "Neolithic revolution" by V. Gordon Childe, there is a distinct lack of knowledge about the development of agriculture on the African continent and African archaeology in general. Although Ifri Oudadane is not in any of the three areas of Africa that are thought to have independently developed agriculture (Ethiopian highlands, West Africa, Sahel) its location and the time frame of the early Neolithic occupation layers allows archaeologists to research and contextualize the agricultural revolution in the Maghreb region. This allows for a relationship to form between the development of agriculture in northwestern Africa and the rest of the world.

=== Similarities with European agricultural developments ===
Dates for cultivated plant remains become more recent the further west said materials are recovered from. Whereas the earliest dates from Cyprus are around 10k years before present, dates along the Iberian Peninsula range anywhere between 7.7k and 7.2k years before present. By comparing these dates to those from Ifri Oudadane, of which the earliest cultivated organic remains dates to around 7.3k years BP supports the hypothesis of a fairly contemporaneous spread of agriculture throughout both the northwest and southwest coasts of the Mediterranean. In fact, sites in the Andalusia region (the closest to Morocco) of Spain show dates of 7.3k years BP, matching those of Ifri Oudadane.

=== Developmental changes of fire ===
Reconstructions of the usage of fire in the rock shelter through the analysis of black carbon left in the soil after the burning of various fuels. Through this data, archaeologists have been able to determine differences of fire usage, and in turn the local environment, throughout the various periods of occupation.

==== Epipaleolithic ====
Much more black carbon was detected in the epipaleolithic layers of soil at Ifri Oudadane. Through this observance, it can be determined that temperatures of fires were higher in the epipaleolithic occupations than early neolithic ones. This implies a heavier use of wood as fuel and in turn less space for cultivated crops, as trees would need much space to grow.

==== Early neolithic ====
Black carbon levels were lower in the early neolithic occupation layers, implying a lower temperature fire. Fuels of a lower temperature fire could be anything from grasses, the dung of domesticated animals, and leftover foodstuffs. Such fires point towards an increase in cultivation and domestication, as forest lands would be used to grow crops and wood becomes more rare.

== See also ==
- Gueldaman caves
- Ifri n'Amr or Moussa
- Kelif el Boroud
