= Gueldaman caves =

Karst network of caves in the Soummam valley in Algeria

- Adrar Gueldaman
- Gueldaman prehistoric site
- location in Algeria
- 36°27′N 4°33′E
- Type: cave
- Periods: Mesolithic, Neolithic
- Associated with: Paleo-humans
- Location: Soummam Valley, Béjaïa Province, Algeria
- Region: Kabylia, Tell Atlas

Site notes
- Material: Jurassic limestone
- Height: 898 m (2,946 ft)
- Length: 7 km (4.3 mi)
- Excavation dates: 1926, 2010, 2012
- Archaeologists: de Beaurnais, Royer

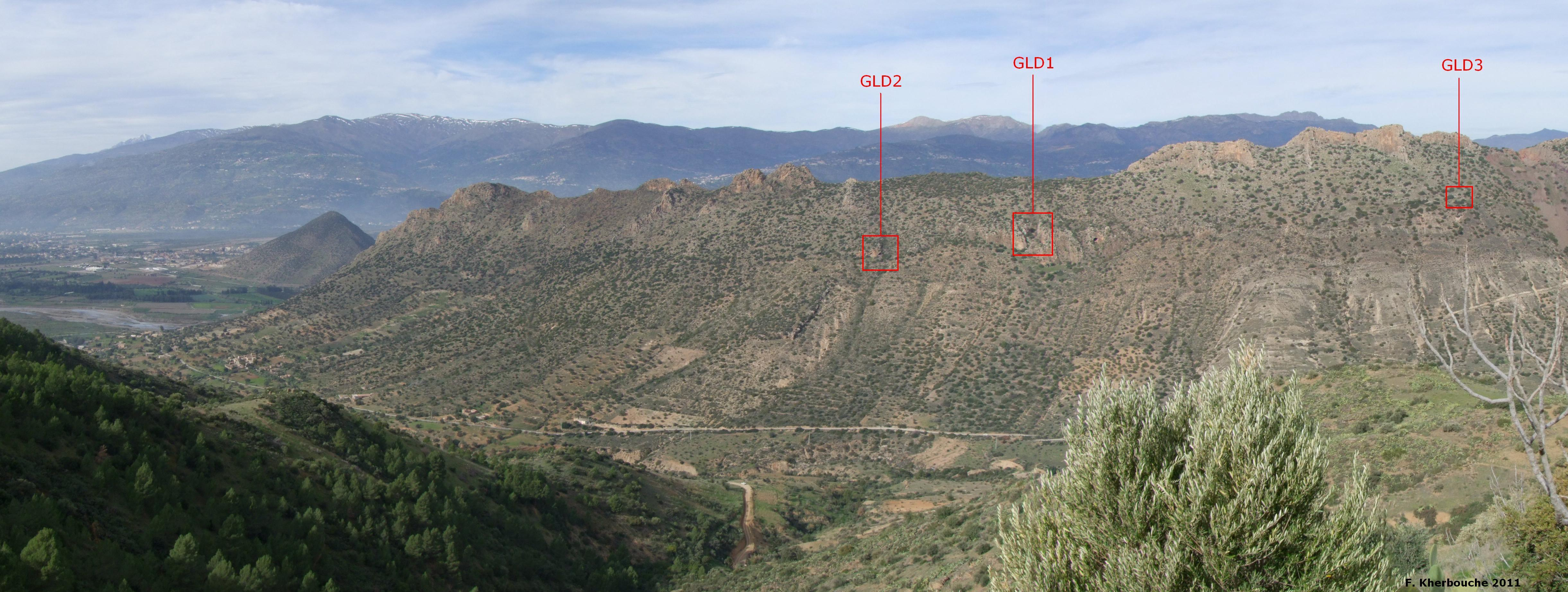
Location of the prehistoric Gueldman Caves

The Gueldaman caves (Adrar Gueldaman) are a prehistoric mountain ridge on the right bank of the Soummam valley in Algeria. The ridge consists of a large karst network with several natural caves, which is situated near the town of Akbou, Béjaïa Province, in the western part of the Babor Mountains in the Tell Atlas range. The location spans over 7 km (4.3 mi) and varies in altitude between 556 m (1,824 ft) to 898 m (2,946 ft). Adrar is a Berber (Amazigh) term for mountain, possibly a cognate of the toponym Atlas. Gueldaman is a Numidian water deity.

== Overview ==
On the South-Eastern side of the ridge sit six caves. The 80 m (260 ft) long cave GLD1 lying 507 m (1,663 ft) above sea level was first excavated during the 1920s by de Beaumais and Royer. Deposits of human occupation were identified and due to the discovery of a set of polished stone tools the site was associated with the early Neolithic although without chrono-stratigraphic analysis and without regard for the regional cultural context at the time. Only since 2010, when excavations resumed by CNRPAH (National Center of prehistoric anthropological and historical research in Algiers) was the regional process of "Neolithisation" investigated methodically. First reflected in the results of the zooarchaeological analysis of the macro-mammals as a shift in the management of the livestock herds takes place from mere production of meat towards the production of meat and the use of secondary products.

GLD1 deposits are more than 5 m deep, remains (mammal bones, mollusc shells and plant-remains), cultural material (ceramics, lithic and bone tools) and ornaments (gastropod shells, bird bones, tortoise shells and ostrich eggshells) are well preserved. Some of these objects suggest long distance trade. Human occupation ranges from 1484 BP to 17.031 BP. The vast majority of artifacts and the introduction of sheep/goat domestication dates to the 6th and 7th millennia BP.

In 2010 to 2012 the caves GLD2 and GLD3 were investigated for the first time and indices of human occupation collected, similar to those of GLD1. As Holocene cultures are unknown in the region, further excavations have to determine, whether Gueldaman is the key to regional acculturation from hunters/gatherers towards herding/cultivation.

The excavations carried out in 2011 and 2012 were mainly focused on two areas of 7 m2 in Sector 2 and 1 m2 in Sector 3. The excavations in S2 were split into two parts. The first excavation started in the second part, but the process was slowly advancing because of the firmness of the residues and clay floor. Soon after reaching 20 cm depth, the investigation was finished. During the excavations in the Section 3, an area at a depth of 2 meters was investigated, but bedrock was not reached.

In 2015, several international geologic and meteorologic sciences institutes published a joint study in which a prolonged drought in the Mediterranean and northern Africa about 4200 years ago was identified. The study supported the hypothesis that past climate anomaly may have played an important role in local cultural disruption, explaining the abandonment of the Gueldaman cave settlements.

== See also ==
- Ifri Oudadane
- Ifri n'Amr or Moussa
- Kelif el Boroud
