= Genetic history of the Middle East =

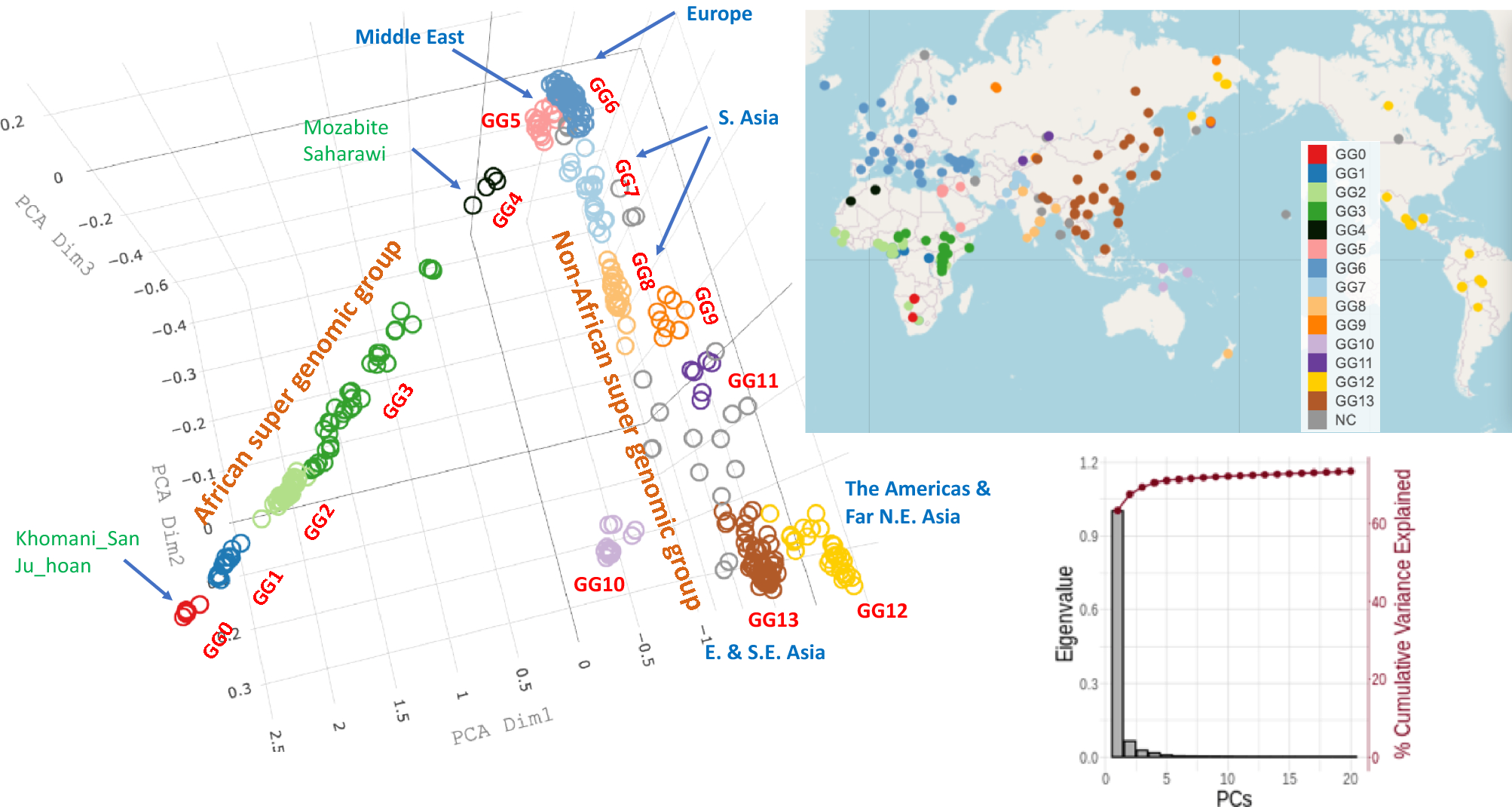
In a whole-genome study of modern-day ethnic groups in the world, samples from various populations in the Middle East were included. Some of these clustered in the "Middle Eastern genomic group" (shown as "GG5" in left image), which included samples from populations such as Samaritans, Bedouins, Jordanians, Palestinians, Iraqi Jews and Yemenite Jews. Left image shows clustering following principal component analysis with three dimensions. Top-right image shows geographical locations where samples were collected.

The genetic history of the Middle East is the subject of research within the fields of human population genomics, archaeogenetics and Middle Eastern studies. Researchers may use Y-DNA, mtDNA, other autosomal DNA, whole genome, or whole exome information to identify the genetic history of ancient and modern populations of Anatolia, Arabia, Egypt, Persia, the Levant, Mesopotamia, and other areas.

== History and overview ==
Developments in DNA sequencing in the 1970s and 1980s provided researchers with the tools needed to study human genetic variation and the genetics of human populations to discover founder populations of modern people groups and human migrations.

In 2005, National Geographic launched The Genographic Project, led by 12 prominent scientists and researchers, to study and map historical human migration patterns by collecting and analyzing DNA samples from hundreds of thousands of people from around the world. National Geographic stopped selling Geno kits on May 31, 2019, and is no longer processing results.

A 2017 review article found that early farming populations in the Levant, Iran, Mesopotamia, Southern Caucasus and Anatolia have significantly influenced modern-day Western Asian genomes. A 2023 study looked at the whole genomes of modern-day ethnic groups around the world, including various populations in the Middle East. The study found that some of these clustered in the "Middle Eastern genomic group", which included samples from populations such as Samaritans, Bedouins, Jordanians, Assyrians, Palestinians, Mandaeans, Iraqi Jews, Syriac Arameans and Yemenite Jews.

== Arabian peninsula ==
A 2024 genome-wide study on 39 individuals who lived between ~650–1750 CE in Socotra, an island situated at the mouth of the Gulf of Aden in the northwest Indian Ocean between Africa and Arabia, indicates a strong genetic connection between these ancient samples and the similarly isolated Hadramawt region of coastal South Arabia that likely reflects a source for the peopling of Socotra. Genome-level analysis shows that, in contrast to the medieval Socotri, all other genotyped mainland Arabs appear to have a much higher proportion of sub-Saharan African-related ancestry dating after the Holocene. The deep ancestry of people from medieval Socotra and the Hadramawt is also unique in deriving less from early Holocene Levantine farmers and more from groups like Late Pleistocene hunter-gatherers from the Levant (Natufians) than other mainland Arabians. This attests to migrations by early farmers having less impact in southernmost Arabia and Socotra and provides compelling evidence that there has not been complete population replacement between the Pleistocene and Holocene throughout the Arabian Peninsula.

== Egypt ==
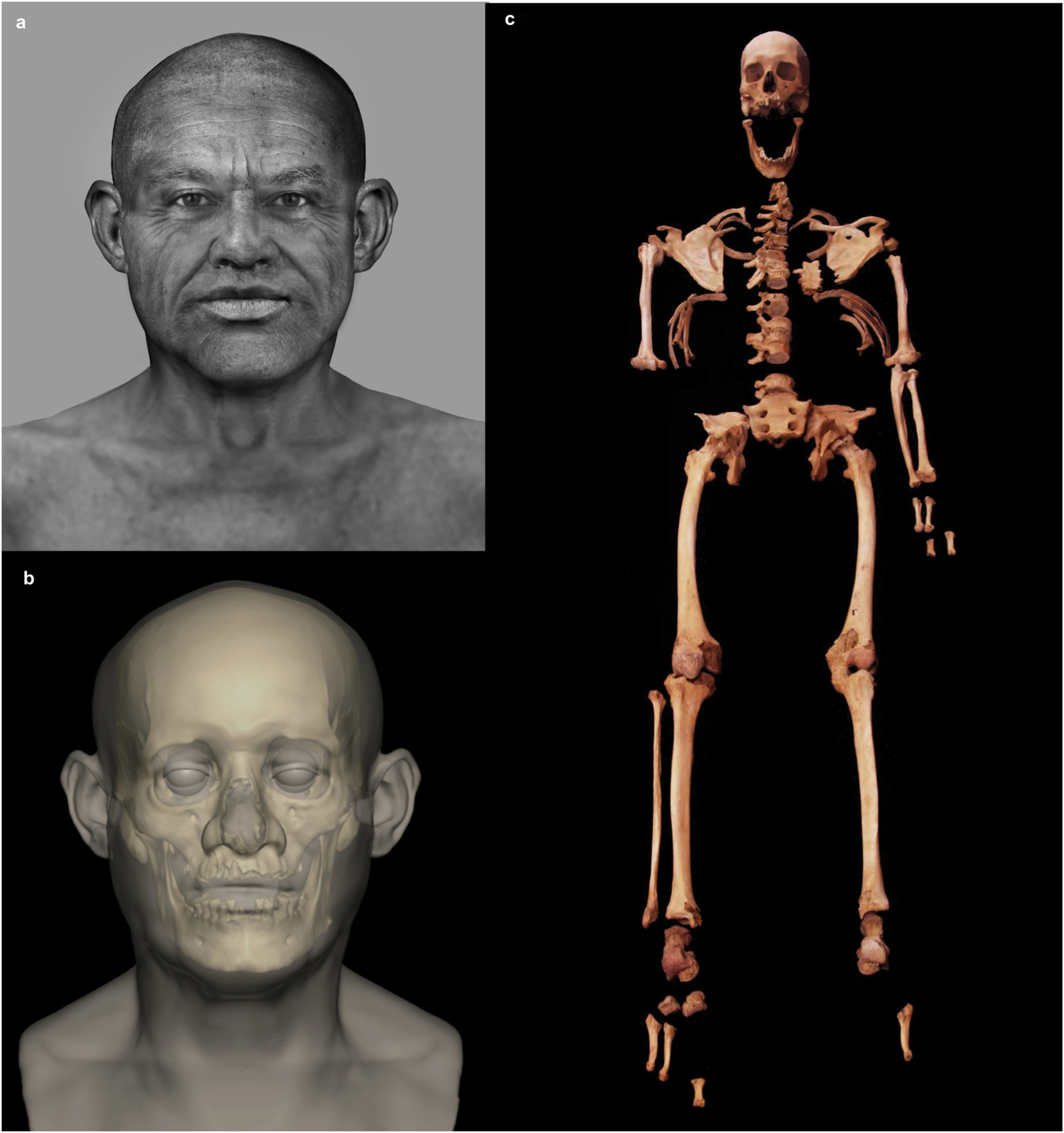
Facial reconstruction and depiction created from the Nuwayrat Old Kingdom individual (NUE001), 2855–2570 BC, Egypt.

Historically, genetic studies on modern Egyptians have identified very old North African lineages along with evidence for the later assimilation of Near Eastern and European groups through an examination of the Y chromosome and mitochondrial DNA chromosome.

Various DNA studies have found that the genetic variant frequencies of North African populations are intermediate between those of the Near East, the Horn of Africa, Southern Europe and Sub Saharan Africa, with the oldest and strongest links being to the populations of West Asia.

A study performed on a sample of 147 modern Egyptians found that the male haplogroups are E1b1b (36.1%, predominantly E-M78), J (32.0%), G (8.8%), T (8.2%), and R (7.5%). The study found that "Egypt's NRY frequency distributions appear to be much more similar to those of the Middle East than to any sub-Saharan African population, suggesting a much larger Eurasian genetic component ... The cumulative frequency of typical sub-Saharan lineages (A, B, E1, E2, E3a, and E3b*) is 9% in Egypt ... whereas the haplogroups of Eurasian origin (Groups C, D, and F–Q) account for 59% [in Egypt]". Cruciani et al. (2007) suggests that E-M78, E1b1b predominant subclade in Egypt, originated in "Northeastern Africa", with a corridor for bidirectional migrations between northeastern and eastern Africa (at least 2 episodes between 23.9 and 17.3 ky and 18.0–5.9 ky ago), trans-Mediterranean migrations directly from northern Africa to Europe (mainly in the last 13.0 ky), and flow from northeastern Africa to western Asia between 20.0 and 6.8 ky ago. Also, the authors identified the frequency of the E-M78 subclade among modern-day populations in the Northeastern African region, which in the study referred to sample groups in Libya and Egypt. Cruciani et al. (2007) also proposed that E-M35, the parent clade of E-M78, originated in East Africa during the Palaeolithic and subsequently spread to the region of Egypt.

A 2004 mtDNA study of 58 upper Egyptian individuals included 34 individuals from Gurna, a small settlement on the hills opposite Luxor. The 34 individuals from Gurna exhibited the haplogroups: M1 (6/34 individuals, 17.6%), H (5/34 individuals, 14.7%), L1a (4/34 individuals, 11.8%) and U (3/34 individuals, 8.8%). The M1 haplotype frequency in Gurna individuals (6/34 individuals, 17.6%) is similar to that seen in the Ethiopian population (20%), along with a West Eurasian component different in haplogroup distribution in the Gurna individuals. However, the M1 haplotypes from Gurna individuals exhibited a mutation that is not present in the Ethiopian population; whereas this mutation was present in non-M1 haplotype individuals from Gurna. Nile Valley Egyptians do not show the characteristics that were shown by the Gurna individuals. The results of the study suggested that the sample of Gurna individuals had retained elements of an ancestral genetic structure from an ancestral East African population, characterized by a high M1 haplogroup frequency. Another 2004 mtDNA study featured the Gurna individuals samples, and clustered them together with the Ethiopian and Yemeni groups, in between the Near Eastern and other African sample groups.

A 2005 genetic study found close affinities of eastern sub-Saharan populations with Egypt in the phylogenetic trees through analysis of the short DNA sequences. The authors suggested that the influential role of the Nile River served as a migratory route and an agent of genetic flow which contributed to present-day heterogeneity in Egypt.

A study that analyzed 275 samples from five populations in Algeria, Tunisia, and Egypt, as well as published data from Moroccan populations, suggests that the North African pattern of Y-chromosomal variation, including in Egypt, is largely of Neolithic origin. The study analyzed North African populations, including North Egyptians and South Egyptians, as well as samples from Southern Europe, the Middle East, and sub-Saharan Africa, and revealed the following conclusions about the male-lineage variation in North Africa: "The lineages that are most prevalent in North Africa are distinct from those in the regions to the immediate north and south: Europe and sub-Saharan Africa ... two haplogroups predominate within North Africa, together making up almost two-thirds of the male lineages: E3b2 and J* (42% and 20%, respectively). E3b2 is rare outside North Africa, and is otherwise known only from Mali, Niger, and Sudan to the immediate south, and the Near East and Southern Europe at very low frequencies. Haplogroup J reaches its highest frequencies in the Middle East".

Shomarka Keita examined a published Y-chromosome dataset on Afro-Asiatic populations and found that a key lineage E-M35/E-M78, a sub-clade of haplogroup E, was shared between the populations in the locale of original Egyptian speakers and modern Cushitic speakers from the Horn. These lineages are present in Egyptians, Berbers, Cushitic speakers from the Horn of Africa, and Semitic speakers in the Near East. He noted that variants are also found in the Aegean and Balkans, but the origin of the M35 subclade was in East Africa, and its clades were dominant in a core portion of Afro-Asiatic speaking populations which included Cushitic, Egyptian and Berber groups. By contrast, Semitic speakers showed a decline in frequency going west to east in the Levantine-Syria region. Keita identified high frequencies of M35 (>50%) among Omotic populations, but stated that this derived from a small, published sample of 12. Keita also wrote that the PN2 mutation was shared by M35 and M2 lineages and this defined clade originated from East Africa. He concluded that "the genetic data give population profiles that clearly indicate males of African origin, as opposed to being of Asian or European descent" but acknowledged that the biodiversity does not indicate any specific set of skin colors or facial features as populations were subject to microevolutionary pressures.

A study analyzed various populations and found that Copts and Egyptians showed low levels of genetic differentiation and lower levels of genetic diversity compared to the northeast African groups. Copts and Egyptians displayed similar levels of European/Middle Eastern ancestry (Copts were estimated to be of 69.54% ± 2.57 European ancestry, and the Egyptians of 70.65% ± 2.47 European ancestry). The study concluded that the Copts and the Egyptians have a common history linked to smaller population sizes, and that the behavior in the admixture analyses is consistent with shared ancestry between Copts and Egyptians and/or additional genetic drift in the Copts.

A genetic study published in the "European Journal of Human Genetics" (2019) found that Northern Africans (including Egyptians) from a global population sample of 164 were closely related to Europeans and West Asians as well as to Southwest Asians. However, the authors acknowledged that the results of the study, which featured the 55 AINSP panel, would have further weight if further extensive population studies from Morocco, Tunisia and Egypt were obtained as only nine population samples were included to represent the North African region.

=== Ancient Egyptians ===
Contamination from handling and intrusion from microbes create obstacles to the recovery of Ancient DNA. Consequently, most DNA studies have been carried out on modern Egyptian populations with the intent of learning about the influences of historical migrations on the population of Egypt. According to historian William Stiebling and archaeologist Susan N. Helft, conflicting DNA analysis on recent genetic samples such as the Amarna royal mummies has led to a lack of consensus on the genetic makeup of the ancient Egyptians and their geographic origins.

In 1993, a study was performed on ancient mummies of the 12th Dynasty, which identified multiple lines of descent, some of which originated from Sub-Saharan Africa, but other lineages were not identified.

Hawass et al. (2010) undertook detailed anthropological, radiological, and genetic studies as part of the King Tutankhamun Family Project. The objectives included attempting to determine familial relationships among 11 royal mummies of the New Kingdom, as well as to research for pathological features, including potential inherited disorders and infectious diseases. Hawass et al. (2012) undertook an anthropological, forensic, radiological, and genetic study of the 20th dynasty mummies of Ramesses III and an unknown man that were found together. This found Y chromosomal haplogroup E1b1a (E-M2) in both individuals, and "Unknown Man E" is now thought to be Ramesses III's son Pentawer.

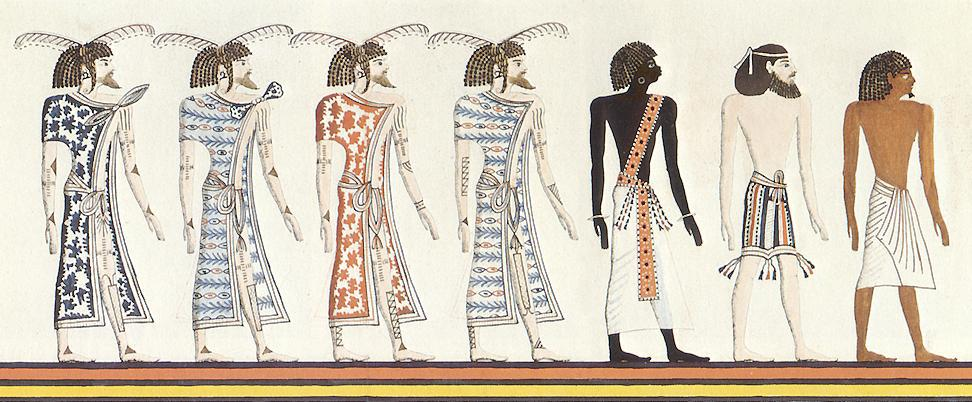
From right to left: an Egyptian, an Assyrian, a Nubian, and Libyans from the tomb of Seti I

In 2013, Nature announced the publication of the first genetic study utilizing next-generation sequencing to ascertain the ancestral lineage of an Ancient Egyptian individual. The research was led by Carsten Pusch of the University of Tübingen in Germany and Rabab Khairat, who released their findings in the Journal of Applied Genetics. DNA was extracted from the heads of five Egyptian mummies that were housed at the institution. All the specimens were dated between 806 BC and 124 AD, a timeframe corresponding with the late Dynastic period. The researchers observed that one of the mummified individuals likely belonged to the mtDNA haplogroup I2, a maternal clade that is believed to have originated in Western Asia.

In a 2017 study published in Nature, three ancient Egyptian mummies were obtained spanning around 1,300 years of Egyptian history from the late New Kingdom to the Roman period. The study used 135 modern Egyptian samples. Two of the three ancient Egyptians were assigned to haplogroup J and one to haplogroup E1b1b1. Both are carried by modern Egyptians. Analyses of the ancient Egyptian samples revealed higher affinities with Near Eastern populations compared to modern Egyptians, likely due to an 8% increase in African component, which occurred predominantly within the last 2000 years. "Genetic continuity between ancient and modern Egyptians cannot be ruled out despite this more recent sub-Saharan African influx, while continuity with modern Ethiopians is not supported." The authors noted that the ancient Egyptian samples were obtained from one site and may not be representative of all of ancient Egypt. They stated that more genetic studies on mummified remains from southern Egypt and Sudan would be needed to reach a conclusive view. Gourdine et al. (2018) criticised the methodology of the study and argued that the Sub-Saharan "genetic affinities" may be attributed to "early settlers" and "the relevant Sub-Saharan genetic markers" do not correspond with the geography of known trade routes". However a follow-up study in 2022 sampled six different excavation sites along the entire length of the Nile Valley, spanning 4000 years of Egyptian history, and the 18 high quality mitochondrial genomes that were reconstructed which the authors argued supported the results from the earlier study at Abusir el-Meleq. In 2023, Christopher Ehret criticised the conclusions of the 2017 study, which proposed the ancient Egyptians had a Levantine background based on insufficient sampling and a "biased" interpretation of the genetic data. Ehret also cited previous genetic analysis which had identified the Horn of Africa as the origin of the E-M35 paternal haplogroup found among Egyptians.

The tomb of two high-status Egyptians, Nakht-Ankh and Khnum-Nakht was discovered by Sir Flinders Petrie and Ernest Mackay in 1907. Nakht-Ankh and Khnum-Nakht lived during the 12th Dynasty (1985–1773 BCE) in Middle Egypt and were aged 20 years apart. Their tomb was completely undisturbed prior to its excavation. Each mummy has a different physical morphology and in the DNA analysis by the University of Manchester, differences between the Y chromosome SNPs indicate different paternal lineages, concluding that Nakht-Ankh and Khnum-Nakht were half-brothers, but Y chromosome sequences were not complete enough to determine paternal haplogroup. The SNP identities were consistent with mtDNA haplogroup M1a1 with 88.05–91.27% degree of confidence, thus confirming the African origins of the two individuals.

In 2020 Yehia Z Gad and other researchers of the Hawass team published results of an analysis of the mitochondrial and Y-chromosomal haplogroups of several mummies of 18th Dynasty Including Tutankhamun in the journal Human Molecular Genetics, Volume 30, Issue R1, 1 March 2021, Pages R24–R28, Results were used to provide information about the phylogenetic groups of his family members and their presence among the reported contemporary Egyptian population data. The analysis confirmed previous data of the Tutankhamun's ancestry with multiple controls authenticating all results. However, the specific clade of R1b was not determined, and the profiles for Tutankhamun and Amenhotep III were incomplete; the analysis produced differing probability figures despite having concordant allele results. Because the relationships of these two mummies with the KV55 mummy had previously been confirmed in an earlier study, the haplogroup prediction of both mummies could be derived from the full profile of the KV55 data. The proposed sibling relationship between Tutankhamun's parents, Akhenaten and the mummy known as the "younger lady" (KV35YL) is further supported.

In 2022, S.O.Y. Keita analysed 8 Short Tandem loci (STR) data published as part of these studies by Hawass et al. (2010), using an algorithm that only has three choices: Eurasians, sub-Saharan Africans, and East Asians, but not North Africa or the Near East, with "Eurasians" being strictly European populations. Nonetheless, using these three options, Keita concluded that the studies showed "a majority to have an affinity with "sub-Saharan" Africans in one affinity analysis". However, Keita cautioned that this does not mean that the royal mummies "lacked other affiliations", which he argued had been obscured in typological thinking. Keita further added that different "data and algorithms might give different results", which reflects the complexity of biological heritage and the associated interpretation.

In 2025, biochemist Jean-Philippe Gourdine reviewed genetic data on the Ancient Egyptian populations in the international scholarly publication, General History of Africa Volume IX. Expanding on a previous STR analysis co-performed with Keita, on the Amarna royal mummies which included Tutankhamun, Gourdine stated the analysis had found “that they had strong affinities with current sub-Saharan populations: 41 per cent to 93.9 per cent for sub-Saharan Africa, compared to 4.6 per cent to 41 per cent for Eurasia and 0.3 per cent to 16 per cent for Asia (Gourdine, 2018).” He also referenced comparable analyses conducted by DNA Tribes company, which specialized in genetic genealogy and had large datasets, with the latter having identified strong affinities between the Amarna royal mummies and Sub-Saharan African populations.

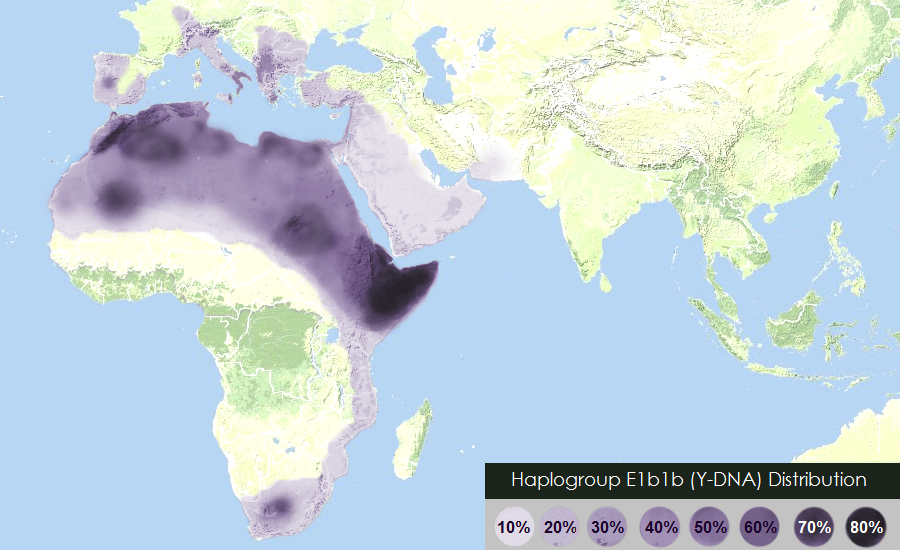
E1b1b is the most common paternal haplogroup across Africa, including Egypt, with modern genetic studies rooting the origin of the E haplogroup in East Africa.

Genetic analysis of a modern Upper Egyptian population in Adaima by Eric Crubézy had identified genetic markers common across Africa, with 71% of the Adaima samples carrying the E1b1 haplogroup and 3% carrying the L0f mitochondrial haplogroup. A secondary review, published in UNESCO General History of Africa Volume IX, in 2025 noted the results were preliminary and need to be confirmed by other laboratories with new sequencing methods. This was supported by an anthropological study which found the notable presence of dental markers, characteristic of Khoisan people, in a predynastic-era cemetery at Adaïma. The genetic marker E1b1 was identified in a number of genetic studies to have wide distribution across Egypt, with "P2/215/M35.1 (E1b1b), for short M35, likely also originated in eastern tropical Africa, and is predominantly distributed in an arc from the Horn of Africa up through Egypt". Multiple STR analysis of the Amarna royal mummies (including Rameses III, Tutankhamun and Amenhotep III) were deployed to estimate their ethnicity have found they had strong affinities with modern Sub-Saharan populations. Nonetheless, these forms of analysis were not exhaustive as only 8 of the 13 CODIS markers were used.

In the view of scholars Christopher Ehret, David Schoenbrun, Steven A. Brandt, and SOY Keita, the Nile Valley served as a crossroads that resulted in population interactions over a long period of time. They cite a range of published genetic studies that identified E1b1 affinities with the Copt populations that are common among Afro-Asiatic linguistic families, including Ethiopian, Cushitic, Beja, Semitic, and Berber populations. These authors referenced a range of genetic studies on the Coptic population which include "(Cruciani et al. 2007; Keita 2008) show for its population: 38.3–60% of M35 and 2–6.9% for M2; M89 12– 58%, and smaller percentages of other haplogroups e.g. B. One Coptic sample from a community that emigrated from Egypt to Sudan had frequencies of 17% of M35, 67% of M89, and 15% of B (Hassan et al. 2008). Another sample of Copts from Adaima in Egypt had >70% of M35, majority M78 (Crubezy 2010)".

Blood typing and DNA sampling on ancient Egyptian mummies is scant; however, a 1982 study of blood typing of dynastic mummies found ABO frequencies to be most similar to modern Egyptians. ABO blood group distribution shows that modern Egyptians form a sister group to North African populations, including Berbers, Nubians and Canary Islanders. A 1972 blood typing study found dynastic mummies to have ABO frequencies most like those of the northern Haratin, a group believed to be largely descended from the ancient Saharans.

== Iran ==
=== Links to Chalcolithic Anatolia ===
A 2017 study analyzed the autosomal DNA and genome of an Iron Age Iranian sample taken from Teppe Hasanlu (F38_Hasanlu, dated to 971–832 BCE) and revealed it had close affinities to a Chalcolithic North-West Anatolian individual from Kumtepe, even closer than Neolithic Iranians. This implies admixture took place between ancient populations of Iran and Anatolia.

=== Gilaks and Mazandaranis ===
A genetic study was conducted on the North Iranian populations of the Gilaks and Mazandaranis, spanning the southwestern coast of the Caspian Sea, up to the border with neighbouring Azerbaijan. The Gilaks and Mazandaranis comprise 7% of the Iranian population. The study suggested that their ancestors came from the Caucasus region, perhaps displacing an earlier group in the South Caspian. Linguistic evidence supports this scenario, in that the Gilaki and Mazandarani languages (but not other Iranian languages) share certain typological features with Caucasian languages, and specifically South Caucasian languages. There have been patterns analyzed of mtDNA and Y chromosome variation in the Gilaki and Mazandarani.

Based on mtDNA HV1 sequences, the Gilaks and Mazandarani most closely resemble their geographic and linguistic neighbors, namely other Iranian groups. However, their Y chromosome types most closely resemble those found in groups from the South Caucasus. A scenario that explains these differences is a South Caucasian origin for the ancestors of the Gilani and Mazandarani, followed by introgression of women (but not men) from local Iranian groups, possibly because of patrilocality. Given that both mtDNA and language are maternally transmitted, the incorporation of local Iranian women would have resulted in the concomitant replacement of the ancestral Caucasian language and mtDNA types of the Gilani and Mazandarani with their current Iranian language and mtDNA types. Concomitant replacement of language and mtDNA may be a more general phenomenon than previously recognized.

The Mazandarani and Gilani groups fall inside a major cluster consisting of populations from the Caucasus and West Asia and are particularly close to the South Caucasus groups—Georgians, Armenians, and Azerbaijanis. Iranians from Tehran and Isfahan are situated more distantly from these groups.

=== Iranian Azeris ===
The 2013 comparative study on the complete mitochondrial DNA diversity in Iranians has indicated that Iranian Azerbaijanis are more related to the people of Georgia, than they are to other Iranians (Like Persians), while the Persians, Armenians and Qashqai on the other hand were more related to each other. It furthermore showed that overall, the complete mtDNA sequence analysis revealed an extremely high level of genetic diversity in the Iranian populations studied which is comparable to the other groups from the South Caucasus, Anatolia and Europe. The same 2013 research further noted that "the results of AMOVA and MDS analyses did not associate any regional and/or linguistic group of populations in the Anatolia, Caucasus and Iran region pointing to strong genetic affinity of Indo-European speaking Persians and Turkic-speaking Qashqais, thus suggesting their origin from a common maternal ancestral gene pool. The pronounced influence of the South Caucasus populations on the maternal diversity of Iranian Azeris is also evident from the MDS analysis results." The study also notes that "It is worth pointing out the position of Azeris from the Caucasus region, who despite their supposed common origin with Iranian Azeris, cluster quite separately and occupy an intermediate position between the Azeris/Georgians and Turks/Iranians grouping". The MtDNA results from the samples overall on average closely resemble those found in the neighbouring regions of the Caucasus, Anatolia, and to a lesser extent (Northern) Mesopotamia.

Among the most common MtDNA lineages in the nation, namely U3b3, appears to be restricted to populations of Iran and the Caucasus, while the sub-cluster U3b1a is common in the whole Near East region.

== Iraq and Kuwait ==
=== Links to South Asia ===
A 2013 study based on DNA extracted from the dental remains of four individuals from different time eras (200–300 CE, 2650–2450 BCE, 2200–1900 BCE) unearthed at Tell Ashara (ancient Terqa, in modern Syria) and Tell Masaikh (ancient Kar-Assurnasirpal) suggested a "possible" genetic link between some people of Bronze Age Mesopotamia and Northern India. However, these links were found in only a handful of people, with the vast majority of Mesopotamian remains from Sumer, Akkad, Assyria and Babylonia having solely local DNA from West Asia, and are likely due to trade links between West and South Asia. A 2014 study expanding on the 2013 study and based on analysis of 15751 DNA samples, concludes that "M65a, M49 and/or M61 haplogroups carrying ancient Mesopotamians might have been the merchants from India".

=== Assyrians ===
In the 1995 book The History and Geography of Human Genes the authors wrote that: "The Assyrians are a fairly homogeneous group of people, believed to originate from the land of old Assyria in northern Iraq and southeast Anatolia, and Ancient Mesopotamia in general[..] they are Christians and are bona fide descendants of their ancient namesakes." In a 2006 study of the Y chromosome DNA of six regional populations, including, for comparison, Assyrians and Syrians from the Levant, researchers found that, "the two Semitic populations (Assyrians and Syrians) are very distinct from each other according to both [comparative] axes. This difference supported also by other methods of comparison points out the weak genetic affinity between the two populations with different historical destinies."

A 2008 study on the genetics of "old ethnic groups in Mesopotamia", including 340 subjects from eight ethnic communities ("These populations included Assyrians, Iraqi Jews, Persian Zoroastrians, Armenians, Arabs, Mandeans, Kurds and Turkmen (representing ethnic groups from Iran, restricted by rules of their religion), and the Iraqi and Kuwaiti populations from Iraq and Kuwait.") found that Assyrians were homogeneous with respect to all other ethnic groups sampled in the study, regardless of religious affiliation and displayed a remarkable genetic continuity from Neolithic, Bronze Age and Iron Age populations of Mesopotamia and Eastern Anatolia.

=== Marsh Arabs ===
A study published in 2011 looking at the relationship between Iraq's Marsh Arabs and ancient Sumerians concluded "the modern Marsh Arabs of Iraq harbour mtDNAs and Y chromosomes that (like those of the Assyrian people, Iraqi Jews and Mandeans) are predominantly of Mesopotamian rather than Arab origin. Certain cultural features of the area such as water buffalo breeding and rice farming, only marginally affected the gene pool of the autochthonous people of the region. Moreover, a Middle Eastern ancestral origin of the modern population of the marshes of southern Iraq implies that, if the Marsh Arabs are descendants of the ancient Sumerians, also Sumerians were not of Indian or Southern Asian ancestry."

The same 2011 study identified Y chromosome haplotypes shared by Marsh Arabs, some Arabic speaking Iraqis, non Arab Assyrians, Iraqi Jews and Mandeans "supporting a common local background."

=== Kuwait ===
The 2013 Genetic study found that Kuwaiti natives can roughly be divided into three groups: the first one is largely of West Asian ancestry, representing Persians with European admixture; the second group is predominantly of city-dwelling Arabian tribe ancestry, and the third group includes most of the tent-dwelling Bedouin surnames and is characterized by the presence of 17% Sub-Saharan African ancestry as a result of slave trade. Population differentiation FST estimates place the first group near Asian populations, the second one near Negev Bedouin tribes, and the third one near the Mozabite population.

== Levant ==
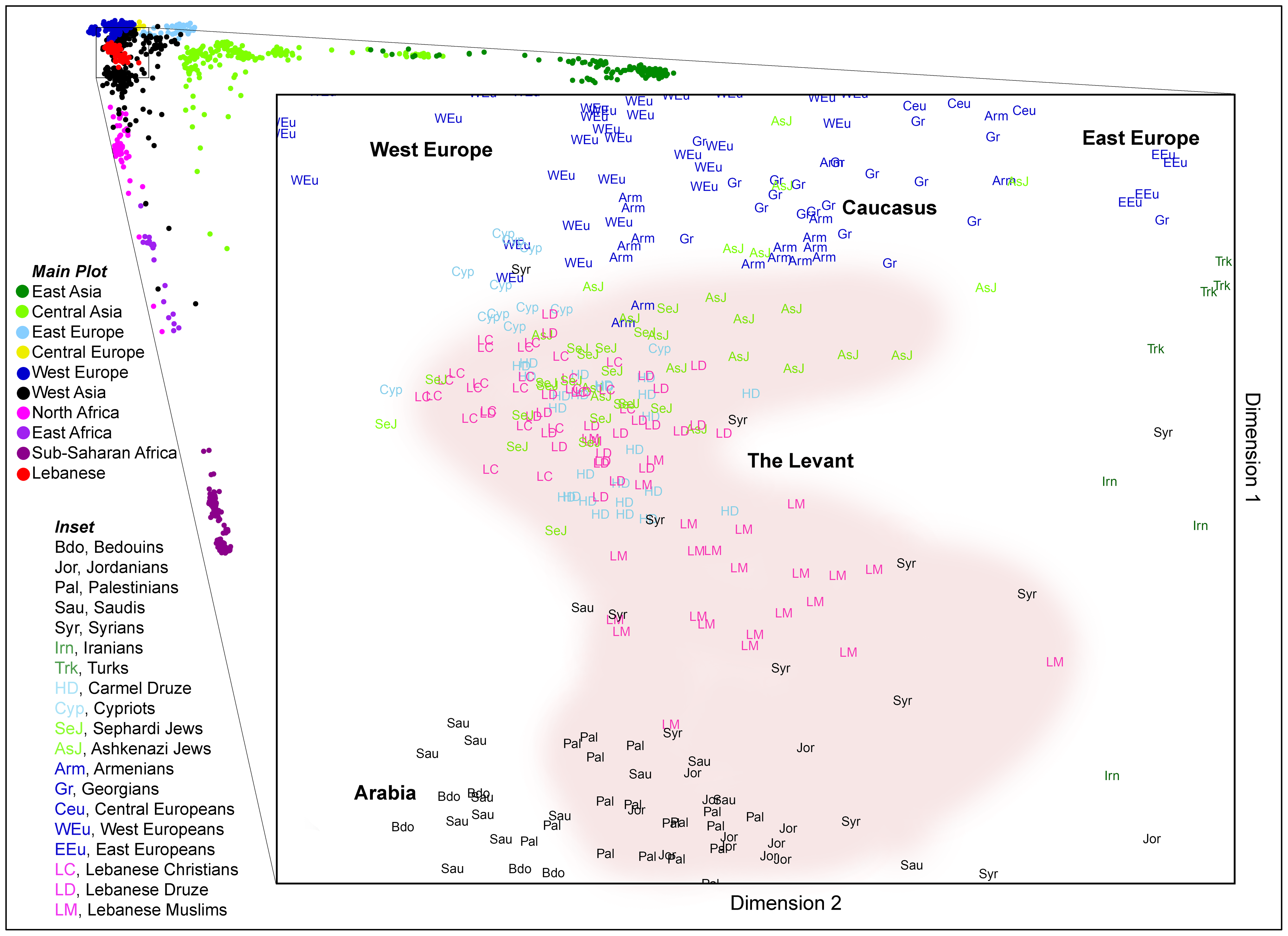
Genome-wide principal component analysis of world populations with the Levantine cluster shaded in pink

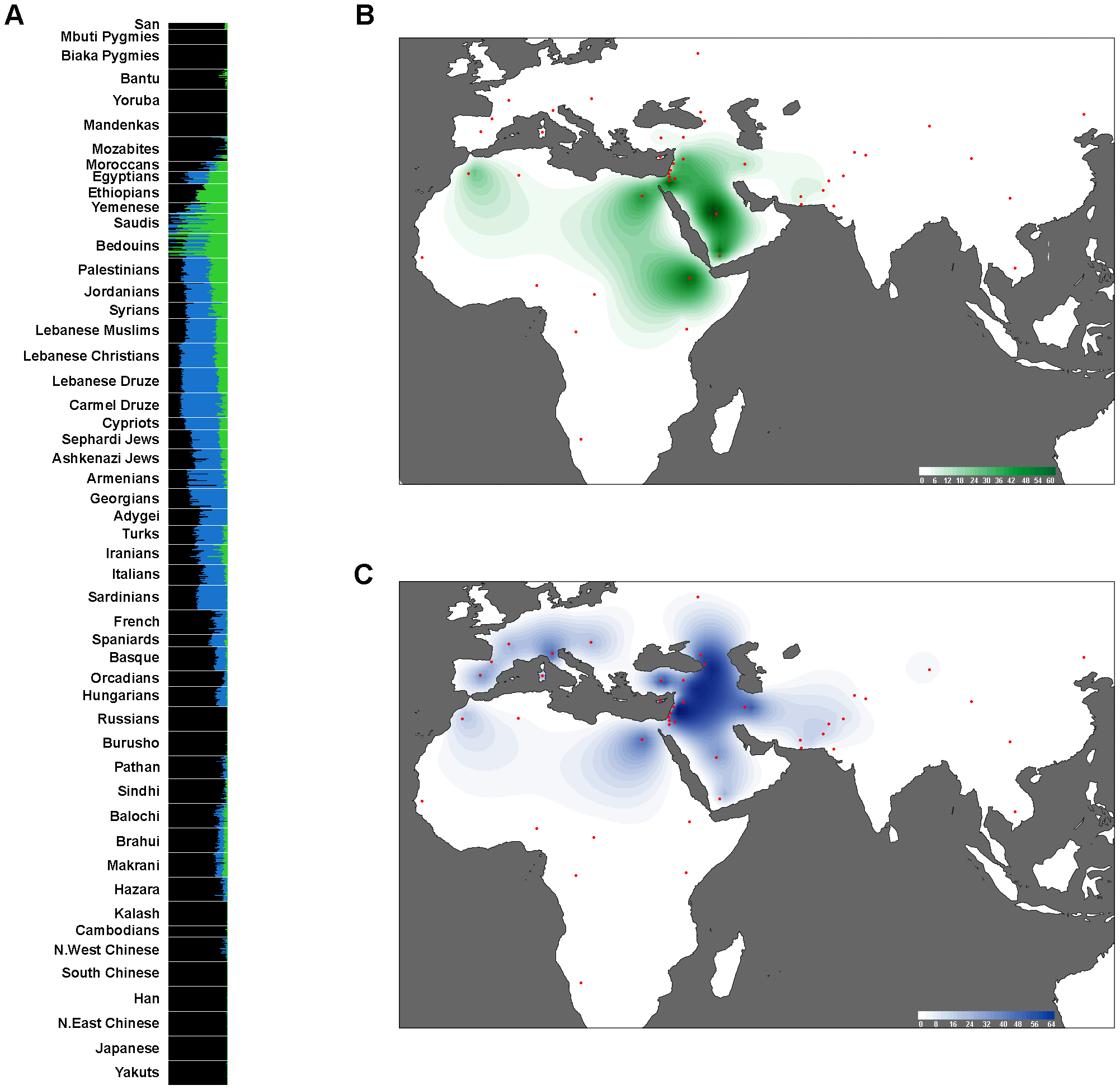
Arabian Peninsula/East African ancestral components Levantine ancestral component Other ancestral components

=== Epi-Paleolithic ===
Ancient DNA analysis has confirmed the genetic relationship between Natufians and other ancient and modern Middle Easterners and the broader West Eurasian meta-population (i.e., Europeans and South-Central Asians). The Natufian population displays also ancestral ties to Paleolithic Taforalt samples, the makers of the Epipaleolithic Iberomaurusian culture of the Maghreb, the Pre-Pottery Neolithic culture of the Levant, the Early Neolithic Ifri N'Amr Ou Moussa culture of the Maghreb, the Late Neolithic Kelif el Boroud culture of the Maghreb, with samples associated with these early cultures all sharing a common genomic component dubbed the "Natufian component", which diverged from other West Eurasian lineages ~26,000 years ago, and is most closely linked to the Arabian lineage.

Individuals associated with the Natufian culture have been found to cluster with other West Eurasian populations, but also have substantial higher ancestry that can be traced back to the hypothetical "Basal Eurasian" lineage, which contributed in varying degrees to all West Eurasian lineages, except the Ancient North Eurasians, and peaks among modern Gulf Arabs. The Natufians were already differentiated from other West Eurasian lineages, such as the Anatolian and Mesopotamian farmers north of the Levant, that contributed to the peopling of Europe in significant amounts, and who had some Western Hunter Gatherer-like (WHG) inferred ancestry, in contrast to Natufians who lacked this component (similar to Neolithic Iranian abd Mesopotamian farmers from the Zagros mountains). This might suggest that different strains of West Eurasians contributed to Natufians and Zagros farmers, as both Natufians and Zagros farmers descended from different populations of local hunter gatherers. Contact between Natufians, other Neolithic Levantines, Caucasus Hunter Gatherers (CHG), Anatolian, Mesopotamian and Iranian farmers is believed to have decreased genetic variability among later populations in the Middle East. Migrations from the Near East also occurred towards North Africa, and the West Eurasian gene flow into the Horn of Africa is best represented by the Levant Neolithic, and may be associated with the spread of Afroasiatic languages from Western Asia into Africa. The scientists suggest that the Levantine early farmers may have spread southward first into North Africa and later into East Africa, bringing along the associated ancestral components.

According to ancient DNA analyses conducted in 2016 on anatomically West Eurasian Natufian skeletal remains in the Raqefet Cave from present-day northern Israel, the remains of 5 Natufians carried the following paternal haplogroups:

Y-DNA

- E1b1b1b2 (xE1b1b1b2a, E1b1b1b2b) - meaning an unspecified branch of E1b1b1b2
- E1b1 (xE1b1a1, E1b1b1b1) - i.e. a branch of E1b1 that is neither E1b1a1 nor E1b1b1b1.
- E1b1b1 - originally classified as CT but further defined as E1b1b1.

Daniel Shriner (2018) reported the following maternal haplogroups recovered from three of the same six males at the Raqefet Cave: J2a2, J2a2, N1b. Using modern populations as a reference, Shriner showed that Natufians carried 61.2% Arabian, 21.2% Northern African, 10.9% Western Asian, and a small amount of Eastern African ancestry at 6.8%, which is associated with the modern Omotic-speaking groups of southern Ethiopia. The study also suggested that this component may be the source of Haplogroup E-M96 (particularly Y-haplogroup E-M215, also known as "E1b1b") among Natufians.

Loosdrecht et al. (2018) argues that the Natufians had contributed genetically to the Iberomaurusian peoples of Paleolithic and Mesolithic northwest Africa, with the Iberomaurusians' other ancestral component being a unique one of sub-Saharan Africa origin (having both West African-like and Hadza-like affinities). The Sub-Saharan African DNA in Taforalt individuals has the closest affinity, most of all, to that of modern West Africans (e.g., Yoruba, or Mende). In addition to having similarity with the remnant of a more basal Sub-Saharan African lineage (e.g., a basal West African lineage shared between Yoruba and Mende peoples), the Sub-Saharan African DNA in the Taforalt individuals of the Iberomaurusian culture may be best represented by modern West Africans.

Lazaridis et al. (2018), as summarized by Fregel (2021), contested the conclusion of Loosdrecht et al. (2018) and argued instead that the Iberomaurusian population of Upper Paleolithic North Africa, represented by the Taforalt sample, can be better modeled as an admixture between a Dzudzuana-like [West-Eurasian] component and an "Ancient North African" component, "that may represent an even earlier split than the Basal Eurasians." Lazaridis et al. (2018) also argued that an Iberomaurusian/Taforalt-like population contributed to the genetic composition of Natufians "and not the other way around", and that this Iberomaurusian/Taforalt lineage also contributed around 13% ancestry to modern West Africans "rather than Taforalt having ancestry from an unknown Sub-Saharan African source". Fregel (2021) summarized: "More evidence will be needed to determine the specific origin of the North African Upper Paleolithic populations."

=== Chalcolithic and Bronze Age periods ===
A 2018 study analyzed 22 out of the 600 people who were buried in Peki'in cave from the Chalcolithic Period, and found that these individuals harbored both local Levantine as well as Anatolian and Zagros-related ancestries. This group has peculiar phenotypical characteristics unseen in earlier Levantines, such as blue eyes.

A 2020 study published in Cell analyzed human remains from Chalcolithic Amuq Valley as well as Bronze Age cities of Ebla and Alalakh in the Levant. The Chalcolithic inhabitants of Tell Kurdu in Amuq Valley were modeled as a mixture of Neolithic Levantine, Anatolian and Zagros-related ancestries. On the other hand, the inhabitants of Ebla and Alalakh required additional Chalcolithic-era Iranian and Southern Levantine ancestry next to their Chalcolithic Amuq valley, implying additional input during the Late Chalcolithic–Early Bronze Age transition. The origins of the Bronze Age groups in the Amuq valley remain debated, despite numerous designations at the time (e.g., Amorites, Hurrians, Palaeo-Syrians). One hypothesis associates the arrival of these groups with climate-forced population movement during the 4.2-kiloyear event, a Mega Drought that led to the abandonment of the entire Khabur river valley in Upper Mesopotamia in search of habitable areas.

=== Canaanites and Phoenicians ===
Zalloua and Wells (2004), under the auspices of a grant from National Geographic Magazine, examined the origins of the Canaanite Phoenicians. The debate between Wells and Zalloua was whether haplogroup J2 (M172) should be identified as that of the Phoenicians or that of its "parent" haplogroup M89 on the YDNA phylogenetic tree. Initial consensus suggested that J2 be identified with the Canaanite-Phoenician (North Levantine) population, with avenues open for future research. As Wells commented, "The Phoenicians were the Canaanites" It was reported in the PBS description of the National Geographic TV Special on this study entitled "Quest for the Phoenicians" that ancient DNA was included in this study as extracted from the tooth of a 2500-year-old Phoenician mummy. Wells identified the haplogroup of the Canaanites as haplogroup J2 which originated from Anatolia and the Caucasus.

A genetic study published in Nature Communications in April 2025 based on ancient samples contested these conclusions, claiming that Punic demographic expansion was primarily driven by the spread of people with Sicilian-Aegean ancestry, while Levantine Phoenicians made little to no genetic contribution to Punic settlements in the central and western Mediterranean. The authors suggest that no single Y-dna haplogroup can serve as and effective marker for Phoenician expansion.

=== Cyprus ===
A 2016 study on 600 Cypriot males asserts that "genome-wide studies indicate that the genetic affinity of Cyprus is nearest to current populations of the Levant". Analyses of Cypriot haplogroup data are consistent with two stages of prehistoric settlement. E-V13 and E-M34 are widespread, and PCA suggests sourcing them to the Balkans and Levant/Anatolia, respectively. Contrasting haplogroups in the PCA were used as surrogates of parental populations. Admixture analyses suggested that the majority of G2a-P15 and R1b-M269 components were contributed by Anatolia and Levant sources, respectively, while Greece/Balkans supplied the majority of E-V13 and J2a-M67. Haplotype-based expansion times were at historical levels suggestive of recent demography.

On the other hand, some of the more recent Principal Component Analyses based on autosomal DNA, have placed Cypriots clearly separate from Levantine and Middle Eastern groups, either at the easternmost flank of the Southern European cluster, or in an intermediate position between Southern Europeans and northern Levantines. In a study by Harvard geneticist Iosif Lazarides and colleagues investigating the genetic origins of the Minoans and Mycenaeans, Cypriots were found to be the second least differentiated population from Bronze Age Mycenaeans based on FST index and also genetically differentiated from Levantines. According to genetic studies, there are close connections between modern Anatolian and Cypriot populations. A 2016 study, which focused on patrilineal ancestry, found that among the sampled Near Eastern and Southeastern European populations, Turkish Cypriots had the shortest genetic distances with those from Cyprus, Turkey, Lebanon, Greece, and Sicily.

A 2017 study found that both Turkish Cypriots' and Greek Cypriots' patrilineal ancestry derives primarily from a single pre-Ottoman local gene pool. The frequency of total haplotypes shared between Turkish and Greek Cypriots is 7-8%, with analysis showing that none of these are found in Turkey, thus not supporting a Turkish origin for the shared haplotypes. No shared haplotypes were observed between Greek Cypriots and mainland Turkish populations, while the total haplotypes shared between Turkish Cypriots and mainland Turks are 3%. Turkish Cypriots also share haplotypes with North Africans to a lesser extent, and have Eastern Eurasian haplogroups (H, C, N, O, Q) – attributed to the arrival of the Ottomans – at a frequency of ~5.5%. Both Cypriot groups show close genetic affinity to Calabrian (southern Italy) and Lebanese patrilineages. The study states that the genetic affinity between Calabrians and Cypriots can be explained as a result of a common ancient Greek (Achaean) genetic contribution, while Lebanese affinity can be explained through several migrations that took place from the coastal Levant to Cyprus from the Neolithic (early farmers), the Iron Age (Phoenicians), and the Middle Ages (Maronites and other Levantine settlers during the Frankish era). The main difference between Greek Cypriots and mainland Greeks is the low frequency of the I and R1a haplogroups among Greek Cypriots because the population of mainland Greece has received significant migrations from other Balkan populations, while the biggest difference between Greek Cypriots and inhabitants of the Middle East is the much lower frequency of haplogroup J1 among Greek Cypriots. The predominant haplogroups among both Turkish and Greek Cypriots are J2a-M410, E-M78, and G2-P287.

In a 2019 genome-wide study, Cypriot samples were grouped with people from the Levant (Druze, Lebanese and Syrians) and Armenia among the sampled populations from Eurasia and Africa, using cluster analysis based on haplotype-sharing patterns.

=== Israel and Palestine ===
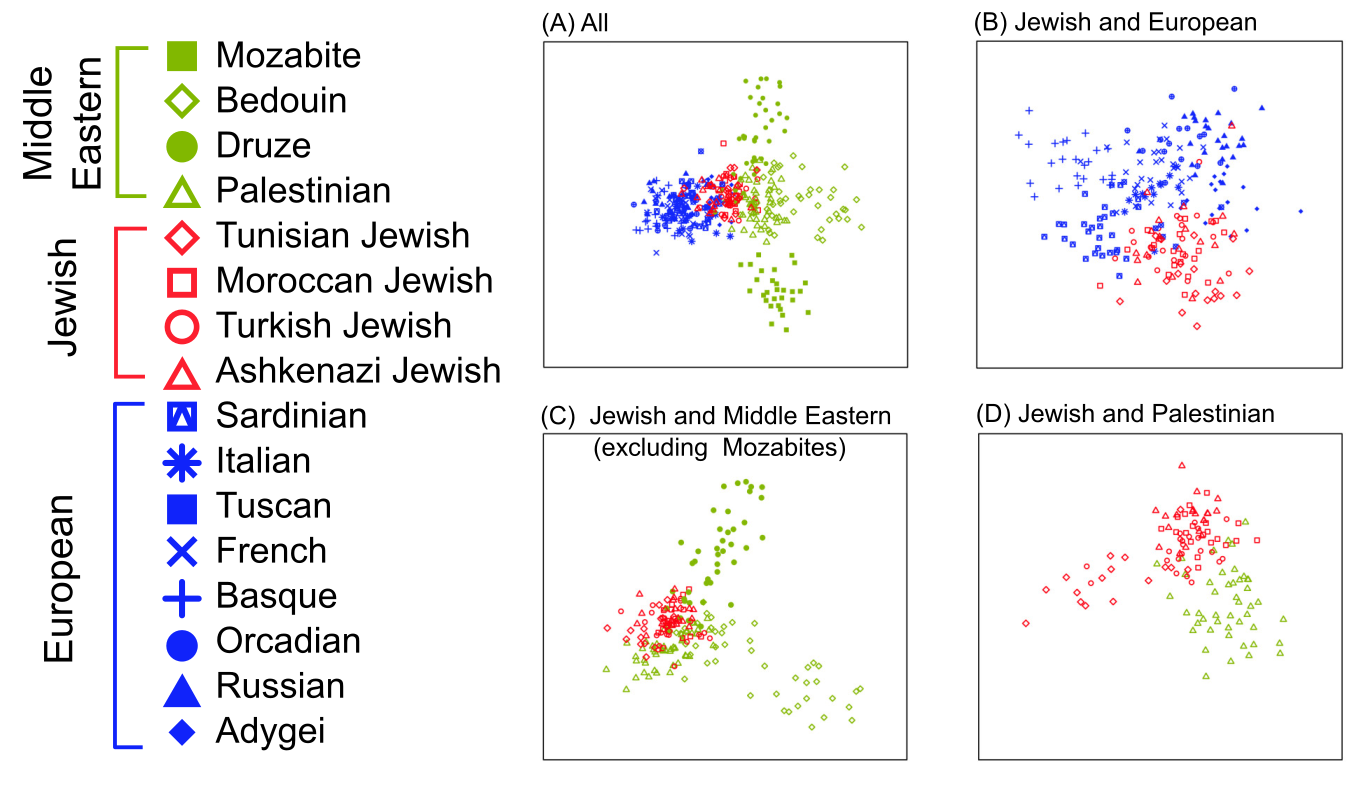
Multidimensional scaling analysis of various populations, including Jews and Palestinians

A study published by the National Academy of Sciences found that "the paternal gene pools of Jewish communities from Europe, North Africa, and the Middle East descended from a common Middle Eastern ancestral population", and suggested that "most Jewish communities have remained relatively isolated from neighbouring non-Jewish communities during and after the Jewish diaspora". According to geneticist Doron Behar and colleagues (2010), this is "consistent with a historical formulation of the Jewish people as descending from ancient Israelites". Approximately 35% to 43% of Jewish men are in the paternal line known as haplogroup J and its sub-haplogroups. This haplogroup is particularly present in the Middle East, North Africa, Horn of Africa, Caucasus, as well as in Southern Europe. 15% to 30% are in haplogroup E1b1b (or E-M35). Using Y-chromosome DNA from male Jews, a study sought to trace the patrilineal lineage of Jewish priests (Cohanim). Results revealed a common ancestral Y-chromosomal haplotype around 2650 years ago, possibly linked to the historic events of Jerusalem's First Temple destruction in 586 BC and the dispersion of the priesthood. Studies of mitochondrial DNA of Jewish populations are more recent, debatable, and more heterogeneous.

Historical records and later genetic studies indicate that the Palestinian people descend mostly from Ancient Levantines extending back to Bronze Age inhabitants of Levant. A 2015 study by Verónica Fernandes and others concluded that Palestinians have a "primarily indigenous origin".

A 2020 study on human remains from Middle Bronze Age Canaanite (2100–1550 BC) populations suggests a significant degree of genetic continuity in Arabic-speaking Levantine populations (such as Palestinians, Druze, Lebanese, Jordanians, Bedouins, and Syrians) as well as Jewish groups (such as Moroccan, Ashkenazi, and Iranian Jews). Palestinians, among other Levantine groups, were found to derive 81–87% of their ancestry from Bronze age Levantines, relating to Canaanites as well as Kura–Araxes culture impact from before 2400 BCE (4400 years before present); 8–12% from an East African source and 5–10% from Bronze age Europeans.

One DNA study by Nebel found substantial genetic overlap among Israeli/Palestinian Arabs and Jews. Nebel proposed that "part, or perhaps the majority" of Muslim Palestinians descend from "local inhabitants, mainly Christians and Jews, who had converted after the Islamic conquest in the seventh century AD".

In a genetic study of Y-chromosomal STRs in two populations from Israel and the Palestinian Authority area: Christian and Muslim Palestinians showed slight genetic differences. The majority of Palestinian Christians (31.82%) were a subclade of E1b1b, followed by G2a (11.36%), and J1 (9.09%). The majority of Palestinian Muslims were haplogroup J1 (37.82%) followed by E1b1b (19.33%), and T (5.88%). The study sample consisted of 44 Palestinian Christians and 119 Palestinian Muslims.

In 2004, a team of geneticists from Stanford University, the Hebrew University of Jerusalem, Tartu University (Estonia), Barzilai Medical Center (Ashkelon, Israel), and the Assaf Harofeh Medical Center (Zerifin, Israel), studied the modern Samaritan ethnic community living in Israel in comparison with modern Israeli populations to explore the ancient genetic history of these people groups. Their findings reported on four family lineages among the Samaritans: the Tsdaka, Joshua-Marhiv, Danfi, and the Cohen family. All Samaritan families were found in haplogroups J1 and J2, except the Cohen family which was found in haplogroup E3b1a-M78. This article predated the E3b1a subclades based on the research of Cruciani et al. (2006)

Mekel-Bobrov et al. (2005) study of ASPM gene variants, found that the Israeli Druze people of the Carmel region have one of the highest rates of the newly evolved ASPM haplogroup D, at 52.2% occurrence of the approximately 6,000-year-old allele. While it is not yet known exactly what selective advantage is provided by this gene variant, the haplogroup D allele is thought to be positively selected in populations and to confer some substantial advantage that has caused its frequency to rapidly increase. According to DNA testing, Druze are remarkable for the high frequency (35%) of males who carry the Y-chromosomal haplogroup L, which is otherwise uncommon in the Middle East. This haplogroup originates from prehistoric South Asia and has spread from Pakistan into southern Iran.

=== Lebanon ===
In a 2011 genetic study that analyzed the male-line Y-chromosome genetics of the different religious groups of Lebanon, revealed no noticeable or significant genetic differentiation between the Maronites, Greek Orthodox Christians, Greek Catholic Christians, Sunni Muslims, Shia Muslims, and Druze of the region on the more frequent haplogroups. Major differences between Lebanese groups were found among the less frequent haplogroups. In a 2007 study, geneticist Pierre Zalloua found that the genetic marker that identifies descendants of the ancient Phoenicians is found among members of all of Lebanon's religious communities. Zalloua emphasized that while Lebanon's communities had their own distinct genetic markers, the division between them was not as pronounced as religious differences. He argued that the genetic commonality among these communities could serve as a unifying force, saying, "It's a story that can actually unite Lebanon much more than anything else."

A 2017 study published by the American Journal of Human Genetics, concluded that present-day Lebanese derive most of their ancestry from a Canaanite-related population (Canaanite being a pre-Phoenician name), which therefore implies substantial genetic continuity in the Levant since at least the Bronze Age. Geneticist Chris Tyler-Smith and his colleagues at the Sanger Institute in Britain compared "sampled ancient DNA from five Canaanite people who lived 3,750 and 3,650 years ago" to modern people; the comparison revealed that 93 percent of the genetic ancestry of people in Lebanon come from the Canaanites, and the other 7 percent is of a Eurasian steppe population.

A 2019 study carried out by the Wellcome Sanger Institute analyzed the remains of nine Crusaders found at a burial site in Lebanon, and concluded that "contrary to the popular belief, the Crusaders did not leave a lasting effect on the genetics of Lebanese Christians." Instead, according to the study, today's Lebanese Christians are "more genetically similar to locals from the Roman period, which preceded the Crusades by more than four centuries." A study on Beta Thalassemia Heterogeneity in Lebanon found out that the thalassemia mutations in some Lebanese Christians are similar to the ones observed in Macedonia, which "may confirm the ancient Macedonian origin of certain Lebanese Christians".

According to a 2020 study published in the American Journal of Human Genetics, there is substantial genetic continuity in Lebanon and the Levant of 91–67% since the Bronze Age (3300–1200 BC) interrupted by three significant admixture events during the Iron Age, Hellenistic, and Ottoman periods, each contributing 3%–11% of non-local ancestry to the admixed population. The admixtures were postulated to be related to Sea Peoples, Central/South Asians and Ottoman Turks respectively.

== Turkey ==
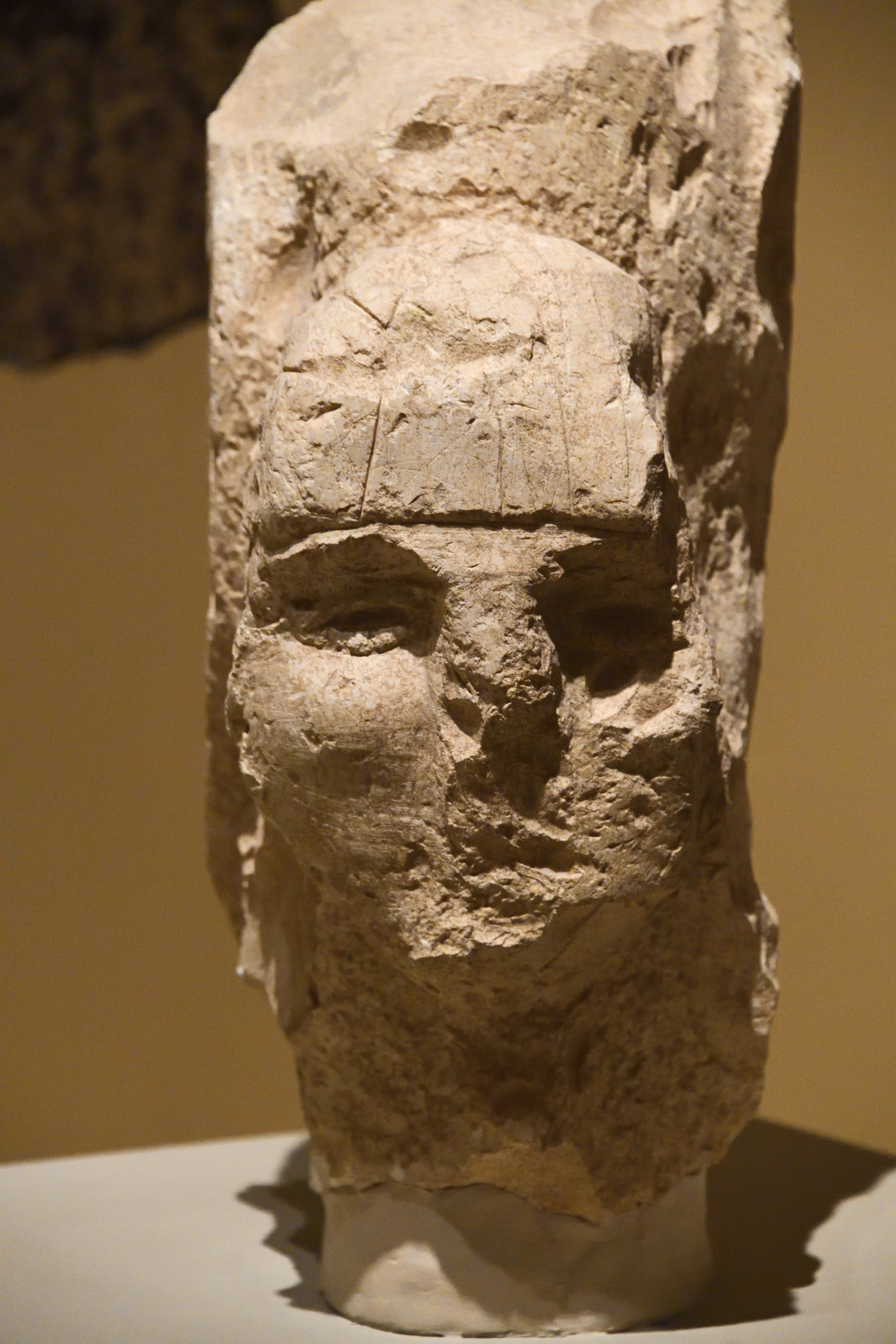
Sculpted head from Nevalı Çori, 8400-8100 BC (Urfa Museum)

Turkish genomic variation, along with several other Western Asian populations, looks most similar to genomic variation of South European populations such as southern Italians. Data from ancient DNA – covering the Paleolithic, the Neolithic, and the Bronze Age periods – showed that Western Asian genomes, including Turkish ones, have been greatly influenced by early agricultural populations in the area; later population movements, such as those of Turkic speakers, also contributed.

A 2014 whole genome sequencing study of Turkish genetics (on 16 individuals) concluded that the Turkish population forms a cluster with Southern European/Mediterranean populations, and the predicted contribution from ancestral East Asian populations (presumably Central Asian) is 21.7%. However, that is not a direct estimate of a migration rate, due to reasons such as unknown original contributing populations. Moreover, the genetic variation of various populations in Central Asia "has been poorly characterized"; Western Asian populations may also be "closely related to populations in the east". Meanwhile, Central Asia is home to numerous populations that "demonstrate an array of mixed anthropological features of East Eurasians (EEA) and West Eurasians (WEA)"; two studies showed Uyghurs have 40-53% ancestry classified as East Asian, with the rest being classified as European. A 2006 study suggested that the true Central Asian contributions to Anatolia was 13% for males and 22% for females (with wide ranges of confidence intervals), and the language replacement in Turkey and Azerbaijan might not have been in accordance with the elite dominance model.

Another study in 2021, which looked at whole genomes and whole exomes of 3,362 unrelated Turkish samples, resulted in establishing the first Turkish variome. The study found mixing between peoples from the Caucasus, Middle East, and Southeast Europe and other parts of Europe in line with the history of Turkey. Moreover, a significant number of rare genome and exome variants were unique to the modern-day Turkish population. Neighbouring populations in the East and West, and the Tuscan people in Italy, were closest to the Turkish population in terms of genetic similarity. Central Asian contributions to maternal, paternal, and autosomal genes were detected, consistent with the historical migration and expansion of Oghuz Turks from Central Asia. The authors speculated that the genetic similarity of the modern-day Turkish population with modern-day European populations might be due to spread of Neolithic Anatolian farmers into Europe, which impacted the genetic makeup of modern-day European populations. Moreover, the study found no clear genetic separation between different regions of Turkey, leading authors to suggest that recent migration events within Turkey resulted in genetic homogenization.

A 2022 study, which looked at modern-day populations and more than 700 ancient genomes from Southern Europe and West Asia covering a period of 11,000 years, found that Turkish people carry the genetic legacy of "both ancient people who lived in Anatolia for thousands of years covered by our study and people coming from Central Asia bearing Turkic languages."

== See also ==
- Biblical terminology for race
- Caucasus hunter-gatherer
- Early human migrations
- Ethnic groups in the Middle East
- Genetic history of Europe
- Genetic history of North Africa
- History of the Middle East
- Middle Bronze Age migrations (ancient Near East)
- Middle Eastern studies
- Near Eastern bioarchaeology
- Y-DNA haplogroups in populations of the Near East

== Bibliography ==
- Cavalli-Sforza LL, Menozzi P, Piazza A (1994). The History and Geography of Human Genes. Princeton, NJ: Princeton University Press. ISBN 978-0-691-08750-4.
- Gourdine J, Keita S, Gourdine J, Anselin A (16 August 2018). "Ancient Egyptian Genomes from northern Egypt: Further discussion". OSF Preprints. doi:10.31219/osf.io/ecwf3.
- Zalloua, P., Wells, S. (2004) "Who Were the Phoenicians?" National Geographic Magazine, October 2004.
