= Kulubnarti fort =

Kulubnarti fort was a fortified house on the island of Kulubnarti in Sudan. It was later converted into a castle. Built during the Middle Ages, the KurfÃ stands on the boulder field at the south end of the island. Tapering towards the top the fort is plastered with clay masonry. Official tax collectors (Kashef) resided at the fortified house at least until the 19th century, when it was converted to a castle. There were similar fortifications in Tarmuki, Kasanarti and Meinarti, all north of the 2nd cataract of the Nile and the flooded Lake Nasser. Modern day excavations could not ascertain if it was abandoned when the population converted from Christianity to Islam. While the Kulubnarti church was close to the fort, dating to the 13th or 14th century of the Christian era, there were no remains found of a nearby mosque from the Ottoman period. The only evidence relating to Islam were three potsherds with Koranic verses.
