= Kulubnarti =

Island in Sudan

Coordinates: 21°4′15″N 30°39′50″E

Kulubnarti ("Kulb island") is a 1 mile (1.6 km) long island in northern Sudan. Located on the Nile, around 100 miles (160 km) south of the Egyptian border, it is part of the village of Kulb.

Until the fifteenth century, Kulubnarti was a remote area. It was one of the last known refuges for Christians in Nubia, while Islam spread to the south. It has been inhabited since the time of the Christian kingdom of Makuria, approximately 1100 AD.

Continuously inhabited from the eleventh century to modern times, it is the only Nubian location which has demonstrated through archaeologically investigation a continuous occupation from the Middle Ages to modern history. Kulubnarti has archaeological and anthropological significance because it has been subjected to one of the only systematic excavations of any site along the southern portion of the Nile. The primary motivation for excavation at Kulubnarti was to increase awareness and understanding of the cultural transition from Christianity to Islam in ancient Nubia. Nubia converted to Christianity by the late 6th century and Christianity prevailed as the dominant religion of the region until the 14th century when Muslims gained control of territory south of the 3rd Cataract. Christianity however, persisted into the 15th century in many regions lying north of the 3rd Cataract, including Kulubnarti. Prior to the archaeological study of Kulubnarti, this cultural transition was almost completely unknown archaeologically and only a few historical references were in existence.

== Geography ==
Kulubnarti is an island located around 120 kilometres (75 mi) southwest of Wadi Halfa. It sits just north of the Dal Cataract, which is situated between the 2nd and 3rd Cataracts. The island is in the Batn-El-Hajar region, a rugged, barren, and rocky area. The usual wide zone of alluvial fertile farmland on the banks of the Nile is missing; only small sections of the island are available for agriculture. The population lives mainly in the modern village at the north and south ends of the island. The altitude is about 200 metres (660 ft) above sea level. There were several villages on this island, with castles, kourfas, houses, and churches.

Before building of the Aswan High Dam, Kulubnarti was an island only at the season of the high Nile flood This remains true today in the sense that it is an island only when the level of Lake Nubia (the Aswan High Dam reservoir) is at its peak.

== Expeditions ==
Johann Ludwig Burckhardt came on his first expedition south of the Nile to the 3rd Cataract in 1813. He was the first to view and describe the abandoned late medieval era settlement situated on the southern end of Kulubnarti. He published his finds about the island and its small, domed church in his 1819 travelogue Travels in Nubia. The first archaeological investigation was done by Somers Clarke in the early 20th century; he explored Christian building remains along the Nile between Cairo and Soba, publishing his findings in 1912, Christian Antiquities in the Nile Valley. In 1969 and 1979, William Y. Adams led the University of Kentucky team's extensive excavations on the island and the neighboring mainland. There were a total of 19 Kulubnarti sites excavated by Adams and his team.

Of the 19 local sites, excavation uncovered 10 settlements, one church, one Christian cemetery, one pottery manufacturing locale, and six rock picture zones. Each of the 19 sites, except for the six rock picture zones, dated to the late medieval period. Approximately 1300 finds were collected and archived. The results showed a continuous history of settlement and exemplified an understanding of the changes in social structures during the gradual transition from the Nubian-Christian empire to the period of Ottoman rule. Additional research groups investigated the cemeteries, including funerary remains.

In 1979, a joint expedition between the University of Colorado and the University of Kentucky, led by Dennis Van Gerven, excavated over 400 burials from two cemeteries, one on the island (site 21-S-46) and one on the mainland (site 21-R-2). The island cemetery was initially thought to have been used in the Early Christian period, while the mainland cemetery was used during the Late Christian period. A recent reanalysis of textiles from the cemeteries and radiocarbon dates has revealed that both cemeteries date from the Early Christian period, though parts of the mainland cemetery are still in use by the modern-day villagers. The human remains from Kulubnarti are one of the best-studied bioarchaeological collections in the world and have contributed significantly to scientists' understanding of morphological variation, biological stress, and health and disease in the ancient and developing worlds.

== Notable landmarks ==
Two notable buildings are the Kulubnarti fort, a fortified house which was converted into a castle, and the 13th-14th century domed Kulubnarti church. Graffito incised into the church building is depicted in three languages, Greek, Coptic, and Old Nubian. East of the fort were four residential buildings of mud brick with stone plinth from the Christian era. There were inscriptions in the western house. Two of the houses had an upper floor, the ground floor being of brick walls and carefully hewn stones. The ceiling on the ground floor rooms consisted of three long, adjacent barrel vaults.

== Biological Research at Kulubnarti ==
Aside from the work of Adams several other research projects have been undertaken at Kulubnarti. Paul Sandberg provided an isotopic analysis of health and illness between the two cemeteries at Kulubnarti, site 21-S-46 and site 21-R-2.

Another study conducted by Kilgore et al. assessed the Kulubnarti sample for evidence and prevalence of traumatic injury. Kilgore et al. found that when compared to other comparative samples, two from North America and two from Europe, Kulubnarti demonstrated a higher prevalence of healed fractures, proportionately greater rates of multiple injuries and severity of injury was generally higher at Kulubnarti. The high prevalence of trauma and the severity of the injuries were largely attributed to the uneven and treacherous terrain in the Batn-El-Hajar.

Ancient DNA analysis of subadult specimens from these burial sites found that the mainland samples predominantly carried European and Near Eastern mtDNA clades, such as the K1, H, I5, and U1 lineages; only 36.4% of the mainland individuals belonged to African-based maternal haplogroups. By contrast, 70% of the specimens at the island burial site bore African-based clades, among which were the L2, L1 and L5 mtDNA haplogroups.

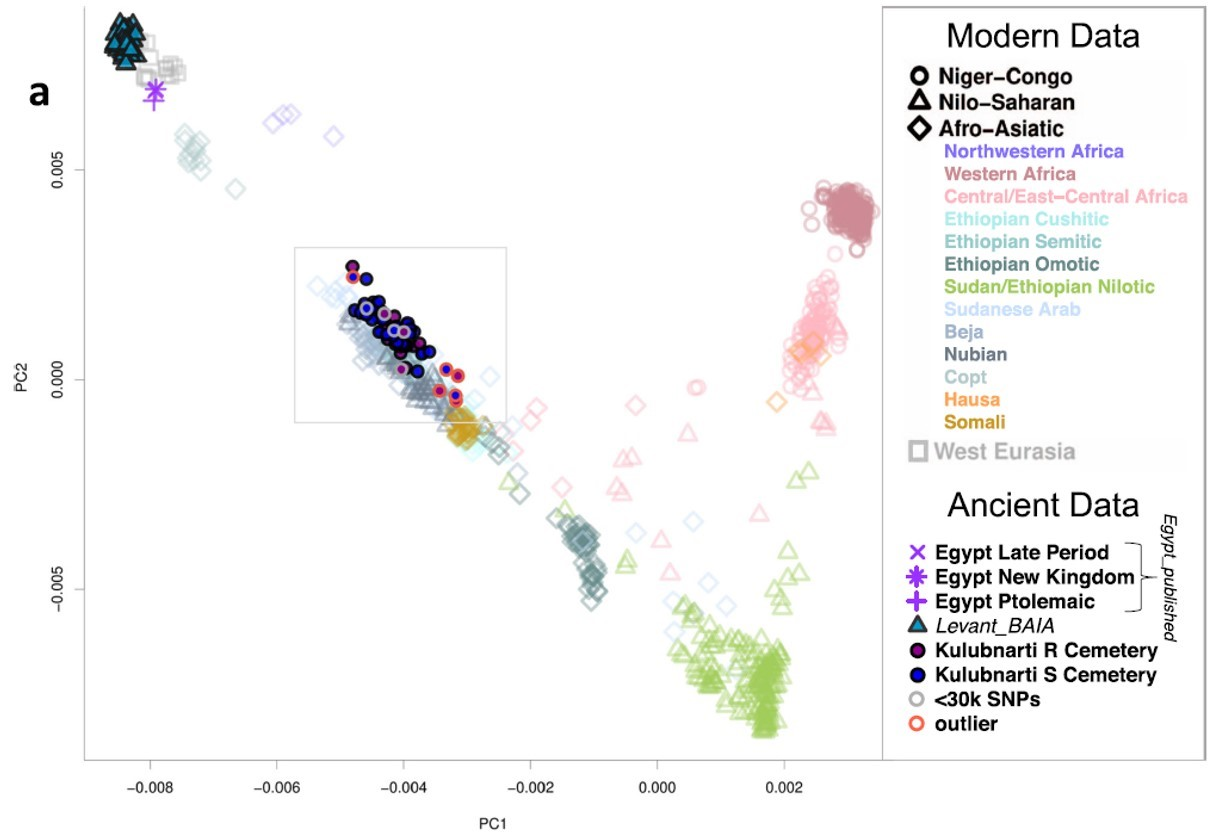
Kendra Sirak et al. (2021): 66 Kulubnarti Nubian, 3 Ancient Egyptian, and 47 Levant Bronze-Age samples projected with modern populations. Kulubnarti Nubians had ~43% Nilotic related and ~57% West Asian ancestry.

In 2015, Sirak et al. analysed the ancient DNA of a Christian-period inhabitant of Kulubnarti. The scientists found that the medieval specimen was most closely related to Middle Eastern populations. 13 individuals from both cemeteries belong to H2a, a European-centered mtDNA haplogroup not previously found in ancient contexts in Africa to our knowledge. 10 individuals from both cemeteries belong to mtDNA haplogroup U5b2b5, though they also exhibit three additional mutations not typically found in members of this haplogroup. Other mtDNA haplogroups: J2a2e, R0a1, T1a7, U1a1, U3b and N1b1a2. 17 males belong to haplogroups on the E1b1b1 (E-M215) branch that originated in northeast Africa ~25 kya and is commonly found in present-day Afro-Asiatic speaking groups. 5 males from the S cemetery belonged to haplogroups on the E1b1b1 branch and another belonged to E2a (E-M41), nine belonged to Y haplogroups with likely West Eurasian origins (R2a2b1b2b-L295, J1a2a1a2d2b2b2c~-YSC0000234, J1a2b2b~-BY94, J2a1b1-M92, G2a-P15, G2a2b2a1-L140), albeit also with distributions that include northeastern Africa, compared to only three from the R cemetery (T1a1a1a1b-Y31477, T1a1a-L208, LT).

The adults interred in the Kulubnarti cemeteries have been the subject of skeletal population genetics analyses focused on framing their relationship with other Nubian groups and select Egyptian samples. Both Kulubnarti cemeteries show some isolation from other Nubians and Egyptians, suggesting genetic drift at the site, which is a common finding when analyzing Nubian groups. Moreover, the S and R cemeteries plot separately in biological distance graphs, demonstrating some genetic differentiation between the island and mainland. An analysis of the biological distances examining Nubian Christian period samples, only, demonstrated the adults in both Kulubnarti cemeteries cluster with the other samples, indicating broad genetic homogeneity among the Nubian sites. Further, the genetic differentiation between the Kulubnarti cemeteries suggests the S cemetery did not have family areas and that unrelated adult individuals may be interred there, but they were not genetically different from individuals in the greater region. The results from a reanalysis of textile and architectural data discounted socioeconomic differences between the two cemeteries explaining any genetic differentiation and instead pointed to the cemeteries potentially being used by the monastery at site 21-S-10 and underscored the need to re-date the material to confirm or reject this hypothesis. Moreover, the S cemetery was shown to potentially be special-use for subadults as the odds of being interred in the S cemetery, as opposed to the R cemetery, were over 6-fold higher for infants and nearly 3-fold higher for other individuals under age 18, as compared to adult females (values were similar for males). It cannot be discounted the monastery and/or other inhabitants preferred to use the S cemetery to bury subadults.

Finally, Kulubnarti has also been utilized as a comparative sample to assess cross –cultural discrepancies in health, stress, disease, violent interaction and mortality levels throughout Sudanese Nubia.

In 2021, Sirak et al. increased individuals analysed in Kulubnarti cemeteries from 3 to 69 "at the Christian Period (~650–1000 CE)". They found that the population of Kulubnarti has 42.5% Dinka people related DNA(Nilotics) and 57.5% West Eurasian related DNA. They also found that Kulubnarti population was an admixture of Nilotic related-ancestry and West Eurasian-related ancestry (mostly through female lineage). Their team also found that the present-day Nubian people are not direct descendants of the people of Kulubnarti without any other subsequence admixtures.

== Archaeological findings at Kulubnarti ==
The excavation of Kulubnarti, organized by Adams, was completed under the auspices of the International Campaign to Save the Monuments of Nubia. The main objective of the research team working at Kulubnarti was to clearly outline the cultural transition from Christianity to Islam using archaeological methods. Upon examination, the churches at Kulubnarti were all Christian in form and none of the structures showed evidence of being converted to a mosque. In fact, no mosques were uncovered in Kulubnarti, suggesting that the religious transition was not readily apparent from a study of the architectural remains. In similar vein, the artifactual remains also provided only minimal evidence of the transition from Christianity to Islam. The artifactual evidence of the cultural transition came in the form of several Islamic texts. The most informative aspect of Kulubnarti, pertaining to the religious conversion, was uncovered in the cemeteries of Kulubnarti. The two cemeteries excavated at Kulubnarti clearly yield evidence of both Christian and Muslim graves. None of the graves could be dated to identify a more precise time for the religious conversion at Kulubnarti.

Further excavations of two Early Christian period (AD 550-800) cemeteries at Kulubnarti, one located on the mainland (R) and the other on an island (S), revealed the existence of two reportedly socioeconomically distinct local populations. However, recent research reanalyzed the evidence presented by Adams and Adams and showed looking at textile types concurrently, rather than individual frequencies as in Adams and Adams, revealed there are no socioeconomic differences. Additionally, the settlement (21-S-40) attributed to the S cemetery and cited as evidence of low socioeconomic status (SES), dates to centuries after the S cemetery. Similarly, the church attributed to the S cemetery at Kulb West dates to centuries later than the S cemetery, and was originally connected to a small settlement nearer to the church than the S cemetery. The biological evidence also does not support claims of socioeconomic differences.

== See also ==
- Ifri n'Amr or Moussa
- Kelif el Boroud
- Luxmanda
- Naqada
