= Kulb =

Coordinates: 21.066111°N 30.661944°E

Kulb is a village on the Nile in northern Sudan. It has been inhabited since the time of the Christian kingdom of Makuria. Until the 15th century, it was in a remote area, serving as a retreat for Christians in Nubia. The domed Kulubnarti church, 21-S-1, is the only known example of a Christian center plan building in Lower Nubia.

== Geography ==
Kulb is located about 130 kilometres (81 mi) south of Wadi Halfa. It sits just north of the Dal Cataract, which is situated between the 2nd and 3rd cataracts. There are two districts, one on the left (west) and another on the right (east) banks of the Nile, called Kulb West and East Kulb accordingly. Between them lies the 1 kilometre (0.62 mi) long island of Kulubnarti. Kulb is situated in the stony Batn-El-Hajar region, and is characterized as being a craggy and barren rocky area.

== History ==
In ancient Egyptian times, Kulb was the southernmost point for metal miners who searched for copper ore and gold for the Pharaohs. During the 4th and 5th Dynasties of Egypt, the Ancient Egyptians quarried from the northern Wadi Allaqi large amounts of copper, leaving rock inscriptions naming Kulb by two officials, "Overseer of the metal detector" (LMY-r smntyw) and a "scribe of the metal detector" (SŠ smntyw). They were apparently responsible for the collection of gold, as their titles indicate that the search for raw materials in Nubia was organized as a state enterprise. From the Roman period, the granite mountains of the Batn-El-Hajar separated the area culturally from the Egyptian influenced Upper Nubia. Kulubnarti has been inhabited since about 1100 AD. It was used until the end of the Christian kingdom of Makuria as a retreat for Christians in Nubia. A fortress on the island may have existed even before that time.

== Excavations ==
The first sketches of the domed church were made in the beginning of the 20th century by the English Egyptologist Somers Clarke, who published his findings in 1912 in Christian Antiquities in the Nile Valley. The domed church was excavated in early 1968 under the direction of James Knudstad. In March 1964, the island was examined and surveyed by Friedrich Wilhelm Deichmann, Erich Dinkler, Peter Grossman, and other members of the German Archaeological Institute Cairo. In 1969 and 1979, William Adams Yewdale led the University of Kentucky team in extensive excavations on the island and on the adjacent mainland. In January–February 1967, Dinkler and Grossman excavated in the southern area of the Batn-El-Hajar. This was followed in the years 1968 and 1969 with two excavation campaigns at Kulb, and on the two northern islands of Sunnarti and Turmuki. It was during this excavation that the perimeter wall of the Kulb fort and some building remains were located. Excavations in the area of research showed evidence of prehistoric culture of the A-group to the Islamic period.
