= Kulubnarti church =

Sudanese church

The Kulubnarti church is an archaeological site and former Christian church located on the island of Kulubnarti, in the village of Kulb in northern Sudan. The island is situated between the 2nd and 3rd cataracts of the Nile, about 120 kilometres (75 mi) southwest of Wadi Halfa, in the Batn-El-Hajar region.

== History ==
"Adams believes that christianity 'probably lasted until the end of the fifteenth century on Kulubnarti island... but the churches both there and in other fortified christian sites in the same area seem to date to the fourteenth century at the latest."

— Ecclesiastical History Society (1975)

Somers Clarke published a sketch in 1912 of the island's church, its walls made of mud bricks. It was fully excavated and recorded by the anthropologist William Yewdale Adams in 1969, and plans and elevations prepared by Friedrich Hinkel. Adams and Peter Grossmann date the church to the 13th or 14th century, Adams having dated pottery finds in the church to that period, and Grossman concurring with the dating on the basis of stylistic comparisons. Greek, Coptic, and Old Nubian language graffito was incised within the church. The church paintings, described by Adams in his 2011 book, were moved to the National Museum of Sudan in Khartoum.

== Architecture ==
The small building has an almost square 7 by 6 metres (23 ft × 20 ft) area. It is typical in all respects of the Late Christian Church Type 4d, having a rectangular rather than an apsidal sanctuary, and eastern corner rooms entered only from the aisles, not from the sanctuary. At the west end there is a staircase in the southwest corner room, but no corresponding room at the northwest corner. There was probably though not certainly a tall cupola over the center of the nave. Entrance, as in all Nubian churches, is through the north and south walls near the western end. There are three pairs of narrow slit windows high in the eastern wall, and two widely separated slit windows in the east and west walls. The entire building consisted of mud bricks with a single layer of rough stones at ground level.

On the interior walls, fairly well preserved remains of two layers of murals were found in the east end of the sanctuary and in both aisles, but not in the eastern corner rooms. Recognizable designs included a Nativity, a figure of Christ Pantocrator flanked by the Disciples, an archangel, and a head of Christ within a tondo, with the symbols of the Four Living Creatures projecting from it. The murals were conserved in 1970 and are now partly on display in the Sudan National Museum. Otherwise the church remains largely as it was when excavated, for it is above the level of waters impounded by the Aswan High Dam.
