= Cave of El Toro =

Cave and archaeological site in Spain

Coordinates: 36°37′38″N 4°31′06″W

Cave of El Toro.

The Cave of El Toro (Spanish: Cueva del Toro) is a cave complex located in the El Torcal de Antequera natural reserve near Málaga, Andalusia, Spain. It lies at about 1,190 meters above sea level. The cave has yielded evidence of human occupation as early as the Early Neolithic (5280 BC).

== Genetics ==
Fregel et al. 2018 examined the remains of 12 individuals buried at El Toro c. 5280-4750 BC during the Early Neolithic. The 1 sample of Y-DNA extracted belonged to the paternal haplogroup G-M201, while the 7 samples of mtDNA extracted belonged to the maternal haplogroups T2c1d, J2b1a (two samples), T2b3 (two samples), K1a1 and K1a2a. The examined individuals were found to be genetically similar to people of the Cardial Ware culture in the rest of Iberia and other Early European Farmers (EEFs) of Early Neolithic Europe. No evidence of sub-Saharan African admixture was detected. Among modern populations they were found to be most similar to Spaniards, Sardinians and North Italians.

== Sources ==
- Fregel, Rosa; et al. (June 26, 2018). "Ancient genomes from North Africa evidence prehistoric migrations to the Maghreb from both the Levant and Europe". Proceedings of the National Academy of Sciences of the United States of America. 115 (26). National Academy of Sciences: 6774–6779. doi:10.1073/pnas.1800851115. PMC 6042094. PMID 29895688.
