= Kehf el Baroud =

Archaeological site in Morocco

Kehf el Baroud, sometimes mistakenly spelled Kelif el Boroud, is an archaeological site in Morocco. It is located to the south of Rabat, near the Aterian industry of Dar es Soltan.

== Genetics ==
Fregel et al. 2018 examined the remains of 8 individuals buried at Kelif el Boroud (c. 3780-3650 BCE) during the Late Neolithic. The 1 sample of Y-DNA extracted belonged to the paternal haplogroup T-M184, while the 6 samples of mtDNA extracted belonged to the maternal haplogroups X2b (two samples), K1a1b1 (two samples), K1a4a1 and lastly T2b3, with the other being undetermined.

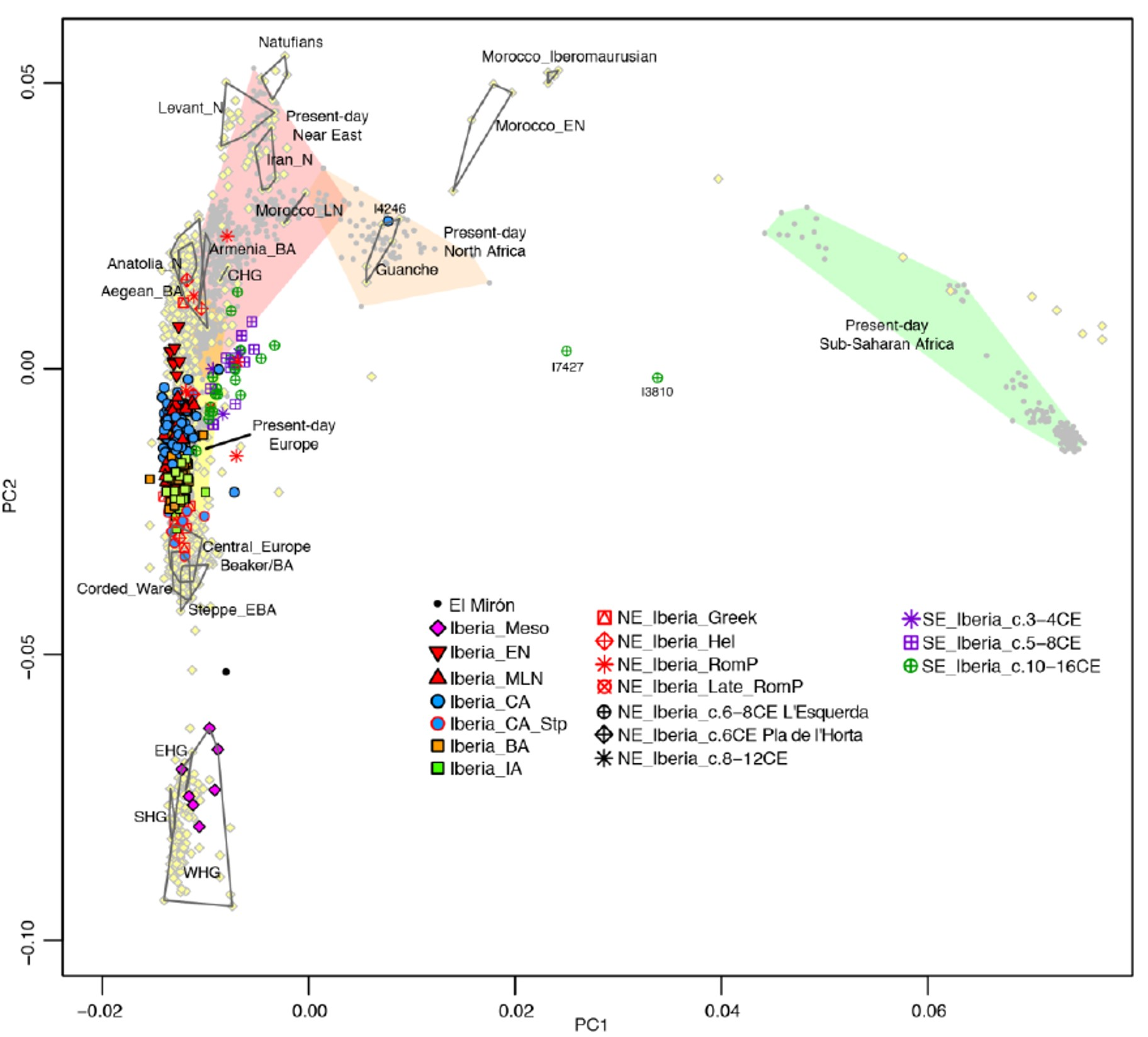

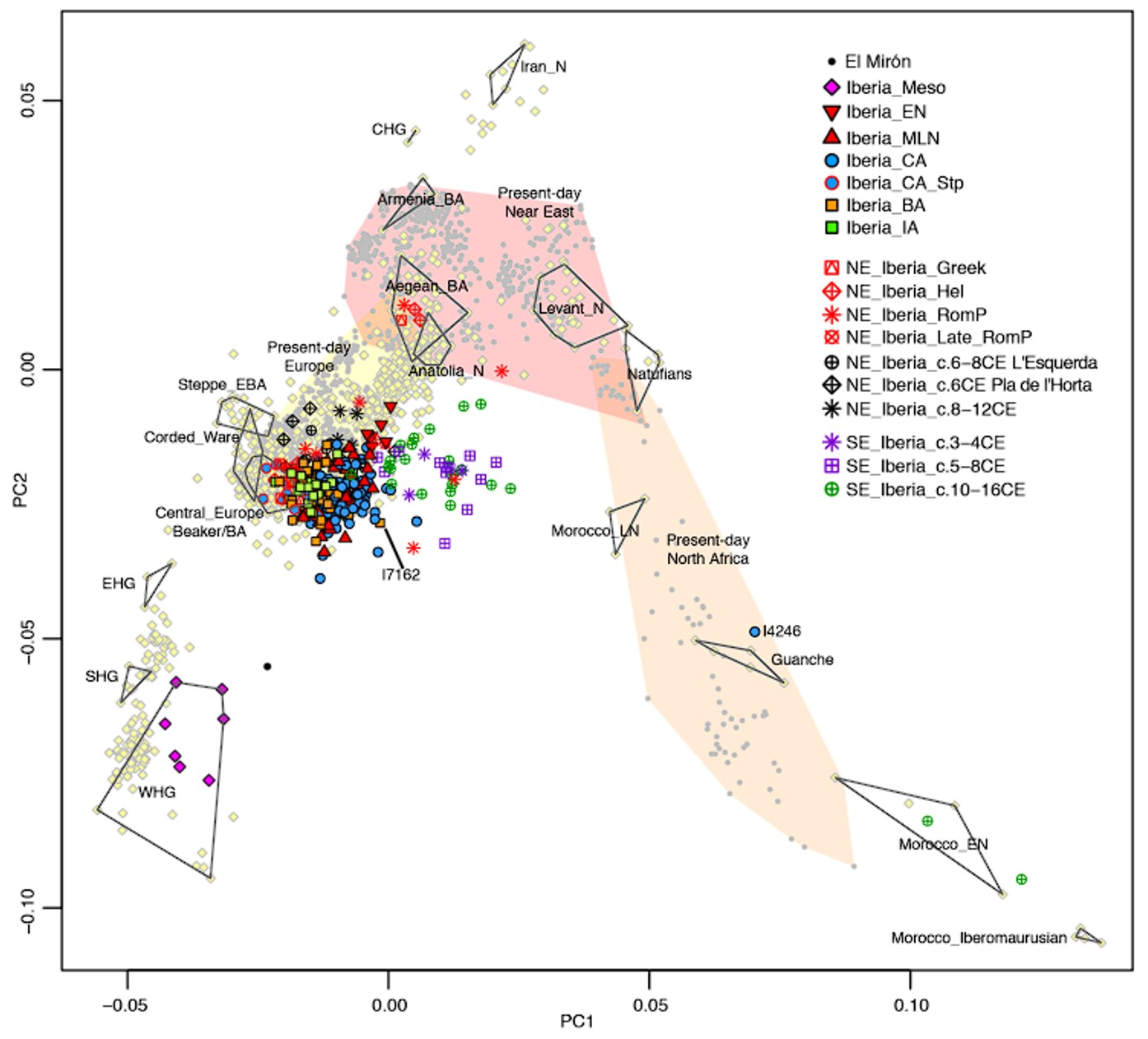
Morocco Late Neolithic in a shared genetic cluster with Guanches and North Africans

The examined individuals were found to share genetic affinities with individuals buried at both the Early Neolithic sites of Ifri N'Amr Ou Moussa in Morocco and the Early Neolithic Cave of El Toro in Spain. They were modelled as being of about 50% Early European Farmer (EEF) ancestry and 50% local North African (IAM) ancestry, suggesting substantial migration from Iberia into North Africa during the Neolithic era of human history. Moreover, they were found to have had a lower amount of Sub-Saharan African admixture than earlier North Africans buried at Ifri N'Amr Ou Moussa, but as well as present North Africans, suggesting that trans-Saharan migrations occurred after. Furthermore, unlike the earlier Ifri N'Amr population, they were fair skinned, and carried various alleles associated with light skin and light eye colors.

The Kelif el Boroud inhabitants were additionally found to be closely related to the native Guanches of the Canary Islands with them having similar admixture profiles, and being ancestral to today's North African populations. Geneticists who conducted these investigations concluded that: "We show that Early Neolithic Moroccans (c. ~5,000 BCE) are similar to Later Stone Age individuals from the same region and possess an endemic element retained in present-day Maghrebi populations, confirming a long-term genetic continuity in the region."

Later research by Simões, Luciana G et al. 2023, showed KEB can be modelled as a mix of ancestries present in northwestern Africa during the Early and Middle Neolithic periods (7,400-6,000 ya). The newcomers from Europe and the Levant brought new ways of life, farming practices, goat and sheep domestication and pottery traditions. These distinct genetic groups coexisted in close proximity, the local hunter-gatherers, farmers from Iberia, and Levantine pastoralists.

== See also ==
- Capsian culture
- Iberomaurusian
- Ifri N'Amr Ou Moussa
- Kulubnarti
- Luxmanda
- Naqada
- Cave of El Toro
- Cardium pottery
- Guanches
- Taforalt

== Sources ==
- Fregel, Rosa; et al. (June 26, 2018). "Ancient genomes from North Africa evidence prehistoric migrations to the Maghreb from both the Levant and Europe". Proceedings of the National Academy of Sciences of the United States of America. 115 (26). National Academy of Sciences: 6774–6779. doi:10.1073/pnas.1800851115. PMC 6042094. PMID 29895688.
