= Ifri N'Amr Ou Moussa =

Moroccan archaeological site

Ifri n'Amr Ou Moussa is an archaeological site discovered in 2005, located in the rural commune of Aït Siberne, Khémisset Province, in Western Morocco. This site has revealed burials associated with the Moroccan Early Neolithic, Levantine Pre-Pottery Neolithic, and Bell Beaker culture.

== Genetics ==
Fregel et al. 2018 examined the remains of 7 individuals buried at Ifri N'Amr Ou Moussa (c. 5325-4786 BCE). The 2 samples of Y-DNA extracted belonged to the paternal haplogroup E-L19*, while the 5 samples of mtDNA extracted belonged to the maternal haplogroups M1b1*, U6a1b (two samples), U6a7b2 and U6a3. The paternal haplogroup E-L19* is very common in North Africa, and the maternal haplogroups are associated with migrations from Eurasia into North Africa during the Neolithic bringing pastoralism technology, and Upper Palaeolithic respectively. They were found to be closely related to the early Stone Age people buried at Taforalt, Morocco (c. 15000 BCE). Both the Taforalt and Ifri N'Amr ou Moussa people were found to also be related to people of the Natufian culture (c. 12000 BCE) and Pre-Pottery Neolithic (c. ~10000 BCE) of the Levant, with whom they appeared to share a common origin. This autosomal genetic continuity with the Taforalt suggested that the ancestors of the Ifri n'Amr ou Moussa people had adopted a Neolithic lifestyle without substantial migration, however a paper from 2023 dealing with ancient genomes in Morocco, found that a change from foraging to food production occurred 7,400 years ago, and farming practices were introduced by Neolithic European groups, being adopted by locals initially without demic diffusion. Nonetheless, the lack paternal continuity with Taforalt individuals, who belonged to haplogroup E-M78 rather than E-L19, suggests that the male ancestors of the Ifri n'Amr ou Moussa are not solely descended from earlier Iberomaurusian culture bearers, and may have influence from the Levant.

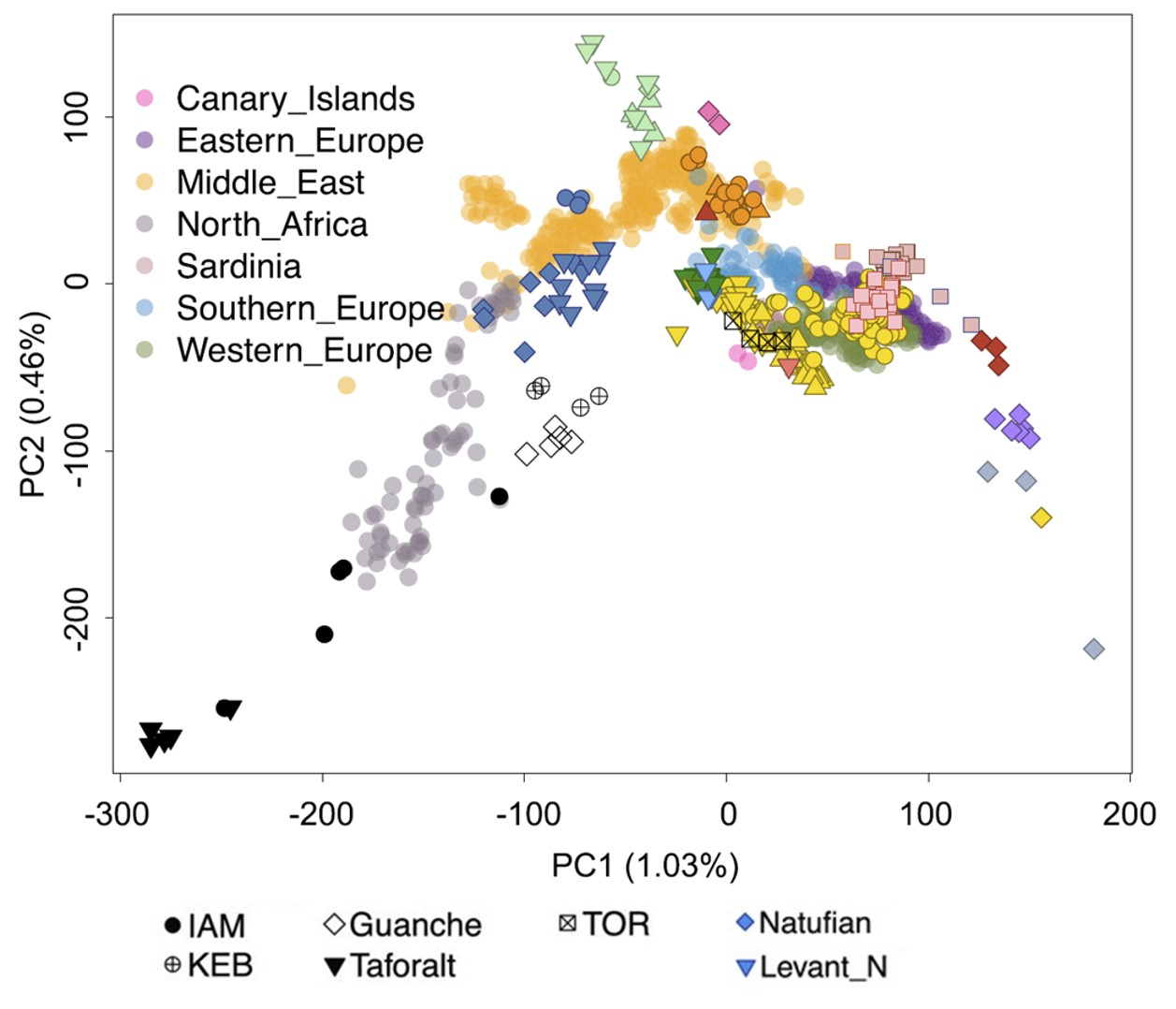
Ancestry inference of ancient samples from North Africa (IAM, KEB, Guanche, Taforalt), the Iberian Peninsula (TOR), and the Middle East (Natufian, Levant_N)

Among modern populations, the examined individuals were determined to be most closely related to the Mozabite people of Algeria. In contrast to the Ifri N'Amr individuals, the examined samples at the Late Neolithic site of Kelif el Boroud (~c. 4000 BCE), carried about 50% Early European Farmer (EEF) ancestry, suggesting substantial migration of Cardial Ware people from Iberia into North Africa during the Neolithic phases. Both the studied groups buried at Ifri n'Amr ou Moussa and Kelif el Boroud carried a much lower amount of Sub-Saharan African admixture than modern North Africans, indicating that the trans-Saharan migrations occurred after Neolithic times (however, they also carried lower Sub-Saharan African admixture than the Stone Age people of Taforalt). Phenotypically, the Ifri n'Amr ou Moussa people were determined to have had dark skin and dark eye color.

The ancient Guanches (c. 500 BCE - 1500 CE) of the Canary Islands were modeled as a mixture of ancestry from the Ifri N'Amr ou Moussa and Kelif el Boroud, with a majority shared component of 80.2% coming from these mainland communities.

== See also ==
- Mechta-Afalou
- Kelif el Boroud
- Taforalt

== Sources ==
- Fregel, Rosa; et al. (June 26, 2018). "Ancient genomes from North Africa evidence prehistoric migrations to the Maghreb from both the Levant and Europe". Proceedings of the National Academy of Sciences of the United States of America. 115 (26). National Academy of Sciences: 6774–6779. Bibcode:2018PNAS..115.6774F. doi:10.1073/pnas.1800851115. PMC 6042094. PMID 29895688.
