= Genetic studies on Bosniaks =

DNA analysis of Bosniak populations

As with all modern European nations, a large degree of 'biological continuity' exists between Bosnians and Bosniaks and their ancient predecessors with Y chromosomal lineages testifying to predominantly Paleolithic European ancestry. Studies based on bi-allelic markers of the NRY (non-recombining region of the Y-chromosome) have shown the three main ethnic groups of Bosnia and Herzegovina (Bosniaks, Bosnian Serbs and Bosnian Croats) to share, in spite of some quantitative differences, a large fraction of the same ancient gene pool distinct for the region. Analysis of autosomal STRs have moreover revealed no significant difference between the population of Bosnia and Herzegovina and neighbouring populations.

== Autosomal DNA ==
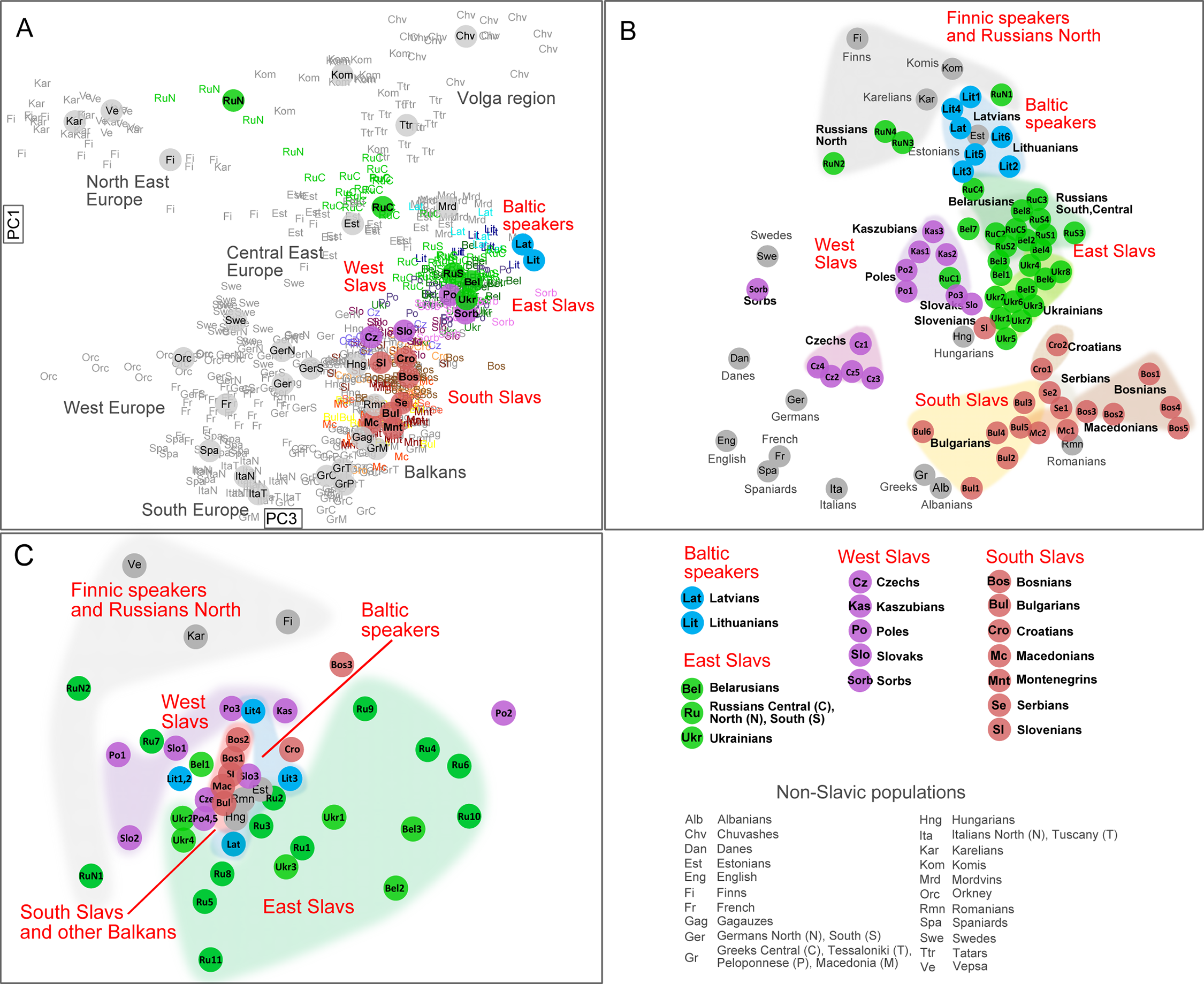
Genetic structure of Bosnians within European context according to three genetic systems: Autosomal DNA (A), Y-DNA (B) and mtDNA (C) per Kushniarevich et al. (2015)

According to 2013 autosomal IBD survey "of recent genealogical ancestry over the past 3,000 years at a continental scale", the speakers of Bosnian language share a very high number of common ancestors dated to the migration period approximately 1,500 years ago with Poland and Romania-Bulgaria cluster among others in Eastern Europe. It is concluded to be caused by the Hunnic and Slavic expansion, which was a "relatively small population that expanded over a large geographic area", particularly "the expansion of the Slavic populations into regions of low population density beginning in the sixth century" and that it is "highly coincident with the modern distribution of Slavic languages". The 2015 IBD analysis found that the South Slavs have lower proximity to Greeks than with East Slavs and West Slavs, and "even patterns of IBD sharing among East-West Slavs–'inter-Slavic' populations (Hungarians, Romanians and Gagauz)–and South Slavs, i.e. across an area of assumed historic movements of people including Slavs". The slight peak of shared IBD segments between South and East-West Slavs suggests a shared "Slavonic-time ancestry".

A 2014 autosomal analysis study of 90 samples showed that Western Balkan populations had a genetic uniformity, intermediate between South Europe and Eastern Europe, in line with their geographic location. According to the same study, Bosnians (together with Croatians) are by autosomal DNA closest to East European populations and overlap mostly with Hungarians. In the 2015 analysis, Bosnians formed a western South Slavic cluster with the Croatians and Slovenians in comparison to eastern cluster formed by Macedonians and Bulgarians with Serbians in the middle. The western cluster (Bosnians included) has an inclination toward Hungarians, Czechs, and Slovaks, while the eastern cluster toward Romanians and some extent Greeks. Based on analysis of IBD sharing, Middle Eastern populations most likely did not contribute to genetics in Islamicized populations in the Western Balkans, including Bosniaks, as these share almost identical patterns with neighboring Christian populations.

According to 2013, 2017 and 2020 autosomal marker studies on 506, 1000 and 600 unrelated individuals, it was confirmed that the Bosnian and Herzegovinian population has highest distance from Turkish people, and highest similarity to Croatian, Serbian and Slovenian people. All three Bosnian and Herzegovinian ethnic groups share a similar genetic background with mostly negligible differences (Bosniaks being closer to Bosnian Croats than to Bosnian Serbs).

== Y-DNA ==
=== Medieval ===
In 2019 and 2021 studies of late medieval stećak archaeological necropolises Kopošići near Ilijaš and Divičani near Jajce, six samples belonged to Y-DNA haplogroup I2a1b3 (with DYS448=19) and one to R1a. Two of the decorated skeletal remains could indicate identity of Bosnian noblemen Mirko Radojević and his son Batić Mirković who served Bosnian King Tvrtko I. In 2021 study of medieval samples from the Travnik area, all eight belonged to J2a, showing close kinship and same paternal lineage by haplotype and haplogroup.

=== Contemporary ===
Y-DNA studies on Bosnians and Bosniaks from Bosnia and Herzegovina show close affinity to other neighboring South Slavs. A majority (>67%) of Bosnians belong to one of the three major European Y-DNA haplogroups: I2 (43.50% especially its subclade I2-CTS10228>S17250+), R1a (15.3% mostly its two subclades R1a-CTS1211+ and R1a-M458+) and R1b (3.5%), while a minority belongs to less frequently occurring haplogroups E-V13 (12.90%) and J2 (8.7%), along with other more rare lineages.

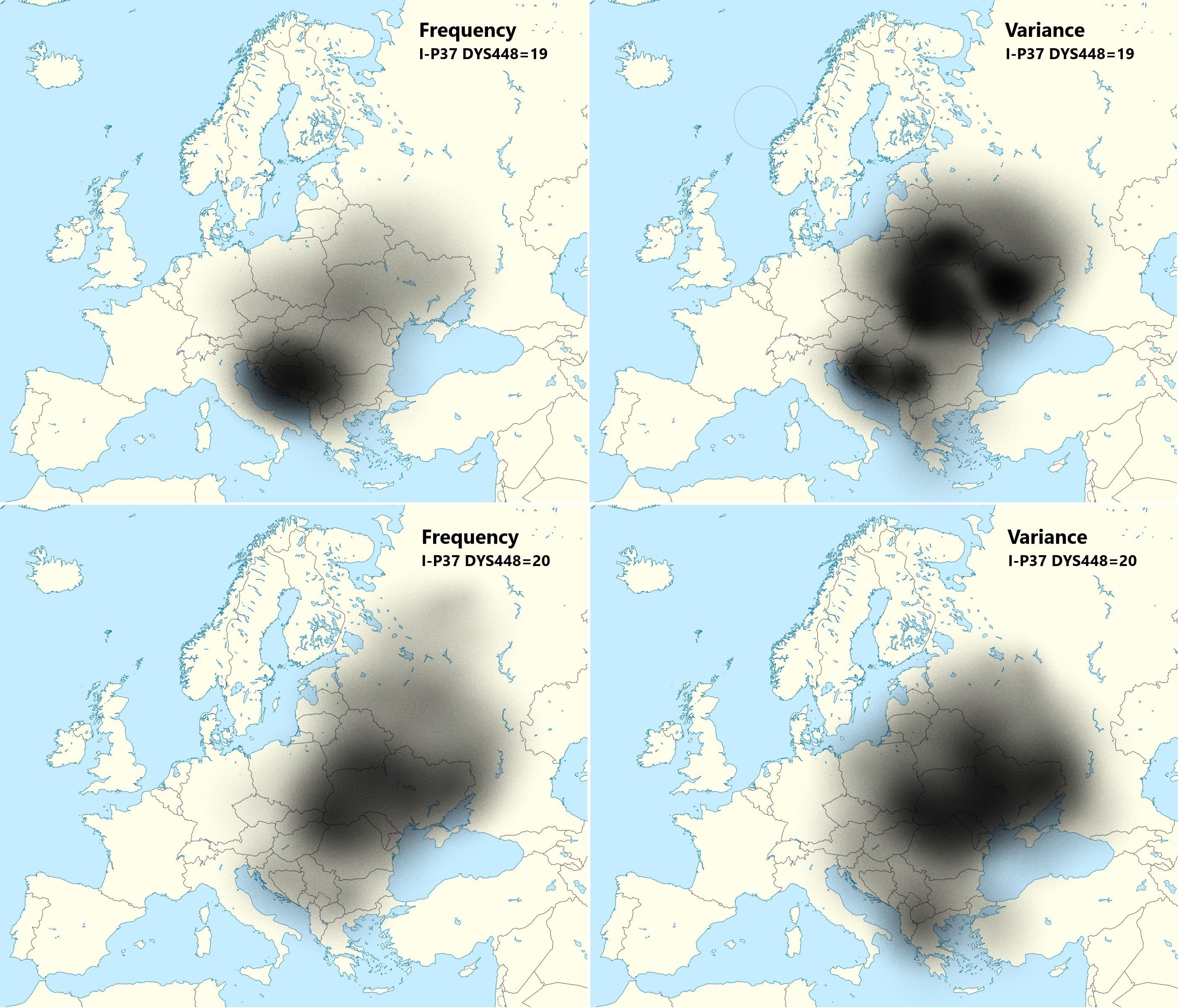
The approximate frequency and variance distribution of haplogroup I-P37 clusters, ancestral "Dnieper-Carpathian" (DYS448=20) and derived "Balkan" (DYS448=19: represented by a single SNP I-PH908), in Eastern Europe per O.M. Utevska (2017).

The frequency of haplogroup I2, especially its subclade I2-CTS10228 and its variance, peaks over a large geographic area covering Bosnia and Herzegovina, Croatia, Serbia, Montenegro, North Macedonia, Albania, Bulgaria, Romania, Moldova, Slovakia, Ukraine, Belarus, Poland and western Russia. In comparison to older research which argued a prehistoric autochthonous origin of the haplogroup I2 in western Balkans, (Note: The SNP I-P37 itself formed approximately 20 thousand YBP and had TMRCA 18 thousand YBP according to YFull, being too old and widespread as an SNP for argumentation of autochthony as well the old research used outdated nomenclature. According to "I-P37 (I2a)" project at Family Tree DNA, the divergence at STR marker DYS448 20 > 19 is reported since 2007, while the SNP which defines the STR Dinaric-South cluster, I-PH908, is reported since 2016. The SNP I-PH908 at ISOGG phylogenetic tree is named as I2a1a2b1a1a1c, while formed and had TMRCA approximately 1,800 YBP according to YFull.) the most recent research by O. M. Utevska (2017) found the haplogroups STR haplotypes have the highest diversity in Ukraine, with ancestral STR marker result DYS448=20 comprising "Dnieper-Carpathian" cluster (modal Y-STR for I2-CTS10228>S17250), while younger derived result DYS448=19 (modal Y-STR for I2-CTS10228>S17250>PH908) comprising the "Balkan cluster" which is predominant among the South Slavs, but can also be found in East and West Slavic populations. The clusters divergence and gradual expansion from the Carpathians in the direction of the Balkan peninsula happened approximately 2,860 ± 730 years ago, coinciding with the Slavic migration. The lack of diversity of DYS448=19 haplotypes in the Western Balkan also indicate a founder effect. Although it is considered that I-L621 might have been present in the Cucuteni–Trypillia culture, until now was only found G2a, and another subclade I2a1a1-CTS595 was present in the Baden culture of the Chalcolithic Carpathian Basin. Although it is dominant among the modern Slavic peoples on the territory of the former Balkan provinces of the Roman Empire, until now it was not found among the samples from the Roman period and is almost absent in contemporary population of Italy. It was found in the skeletal remains with artifacts, indicating leaders, of Hungarian conquerors of the Carpathian Basin from the 9th century, part of Western Eurasian-Slavic component of the Hungarians. According to Pamjav et al. (2019) and Fóthi et al. (2020), the distribution of ancestral subclades like of I-CTS10228 among contemporary carriers indicates a rapid expansion from Southeastern Poland, is mainly related to the Slavs and their medieval migration, and the "largest demographic explosion occurred in the Balkans".

Y-DNA studies done for the majority Bosniak populated city of Zenica and Tuzla Canton, shows however a drastic increase of the two major haplogroups I2 and R1a. Haplogroup I2 scores 52.20% in Zenica (Peričić et al., 2005) and 47% in Tuzla Canton (Dogan et al., 2016), while R1a increases up to 24.60% and 23% in respective region. To the Bosnians and Bosniaks are closest neighboring Croats and Serbs.

Frequencies in Bosnia and Herzegovina and regions

Region	Samples	Source	E1b1b	G	I1	I2a1	J1	J2	F*	K*	R1a	R1b
Bosnia and Herzegovina (Bosniaks)	85	Marjanović et al. (2005)	12.94%=(11/85)	3.53%=(3/85)	4.71%(4/85)	43.53%=(37/85)	2.35%=(2/85)	8.7%	3.53%(3/85)	1.18%=(1/85)	15.29%=(13/85)	3.53%(3/85)

Region	Samples	Source	E1b1b	G	I1	I2a1	J2a	J2b	N	R1a	R1b
Bosnia and Herzegovina (Bosnians)	100	Doğan et al. (2017)	17%	1%	4%	49%	5%	2%	1%	17%	4%

Region	Samples	Source	E1b1b	G2a	I1	I2a	I2b	J1	J2a	J2b	L	N	Q	R1a	R1b	T
Bosnia and Herzegovina (Bosnians)	456	Babić Jordamović et al. (2021)	14.58%	1.25%	6.04%	43.13%	0.21%	0.21%	6.04%	3.54%	0.42%	0.42%	0.21%	14.79%	8.75%	0.42%

Region	Samples	Source	E1b1b	G	I1	I2a1	R1a	R1b
Zenica	69	Peričić et al. (2005)	10.15%=(7/69)	4.35%=(3/69)	1.45%=(1/69)	52.17%=(36/69)	24.64%=(17/69)	1.45%=(1/69)

Region	Samples	Source	E1b1b	G	I1	I2a1	J2	N2	Q	R1a	R1b
Tuzla Canton	100	Dogan et al. (2016)	7%	2%	4%	47%	7%	4%	1%	23%	5%

== Mitochondrial DNA ==
=== Medieval ===
A 2022 study examined 26 skeletal remains from various medieval necropolis, all were predicted for mitochondrial DNA haplogroup H, "two were determined as H5 and the others as H2a sub-haplogroup".

=== Contemporary ===
Genetically, on the maternal mitochondrial DNA line, a majority (>75%) of Bosnians belong to three of the eleven major European mtDNA haplogroups - H (47.92%), U (19.44%) and J (6.94%), while a large minority (>25) belongs to other rare mitochondrial lineages. The mtDNA studies shows that the Bosnian population partly share similarities with other Southern European populations (especially with mtDNA haplogroups such as pre-HV (today known as mtDNA haplogroup R0), HV2 and U1), but are for the mostly featured by a huge combination of mtDNA subclusters that indicates a consanguinity with Central and Eastern Europeans, such as modern German, West Slavic, East Slavic and Finno-Ugric populations. There is especially the observed similarity between Bosnian, Russian and Finnish samples (with mtDNA subclusters such as U5b1, Z, H-16354, H-16263, U5b-16192-16311 and U5a-16114A). The huge differentiation between Bosnian and Slovene samples of mtDNA subclusters that are also observed in Central and Eastern Europe, may suggests a broader genetic heterogeneity among the Slavs that settled the Western Balkans during the early Middle Ages. The 2019 study of ethnic groups of Tuzla Canton of Bosnia and Herzegovina (Bosniaks, Croats and Serbs) found "close gene similarity among maternal gene pools of the ethnic groups of Tuzla Canton", which is "suggesting similar effects of the paternal and maternal gene flows on genetic structure of the three main ethnic groups of modern Bosnia and Herzegovina".

== See also ==
- Genetic studies on Croats
- Genetic studies on Serbs
