= Genetic studies on Croats =

DNA analysis of Croat populations

Population genetics is a scientific discipline which contributes to the examination of the human evolutionary and historical migrations. Particularly useful information is provided by the research of two uniparental markers within our genome, the Y-chromosome (Y-DNA) and mitochondrial DNA (mtDNA), as well as autosomal DNA. The data from Y-DNA and autosomal DNA suggests that the Croats mostly are descendants of the early Slavs of the medieval migration period, according to mtDNA have genetic diversity which fits within a broader European maternal genetic landscape, and overall have a uniformity with other South Slavs from the territory of former Yugoslavia.

There are many Paleolithic period sites located in the territory of Croatia, mostly ascribed to the Mousterian phase in the Middle Paleolithic period. In the Neolithic period in Southeast Europe were founded major cultures like Vinča, Varna, Starčevo. In the Bronze Age happened symbiosis between Proto-Indo-Europeans of Kurgan culture and autochthonous populations, leading to the formation among others also of Proto-Illyrians. They gradually mixed and were assimilated by the Romans, Celts, Ostrogoths, and finally Early Slavs since the late 6th century.

== Y chromosome DNA ==
=== Ancient Y-DNA and atDNA ===
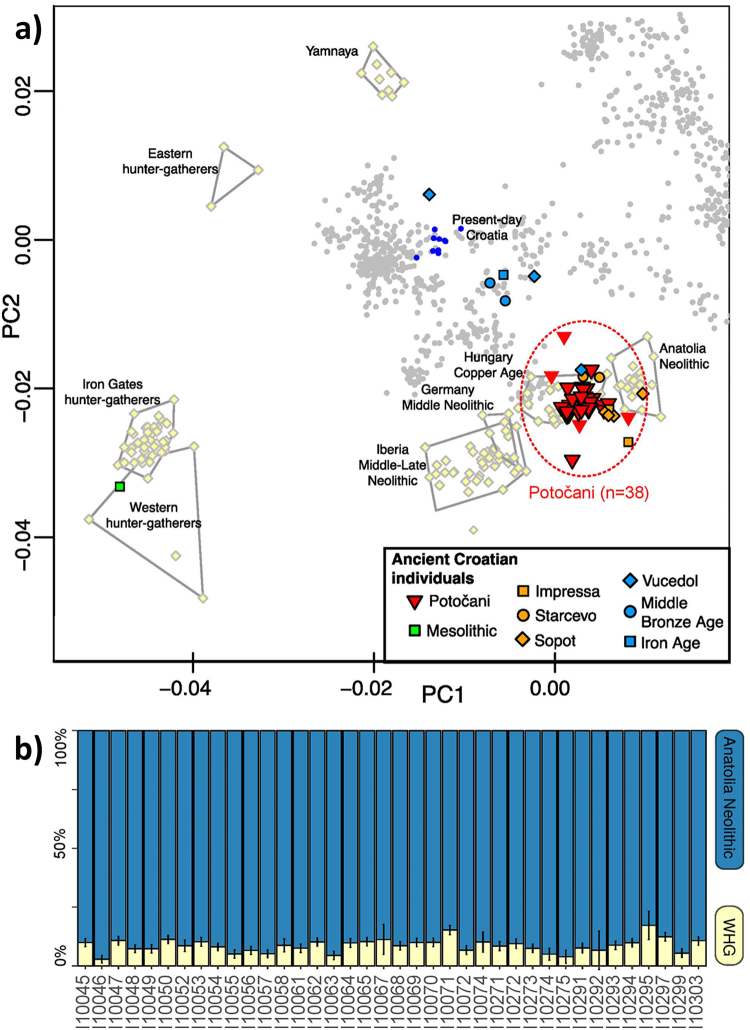
PCA and Admixture of the Copper Age Potočani individuals with PCA of other Neolithic & Bronze & Iron Age samples compared to present-day Croats, per Novak, Olalde, Ringbauer et al. 2021.

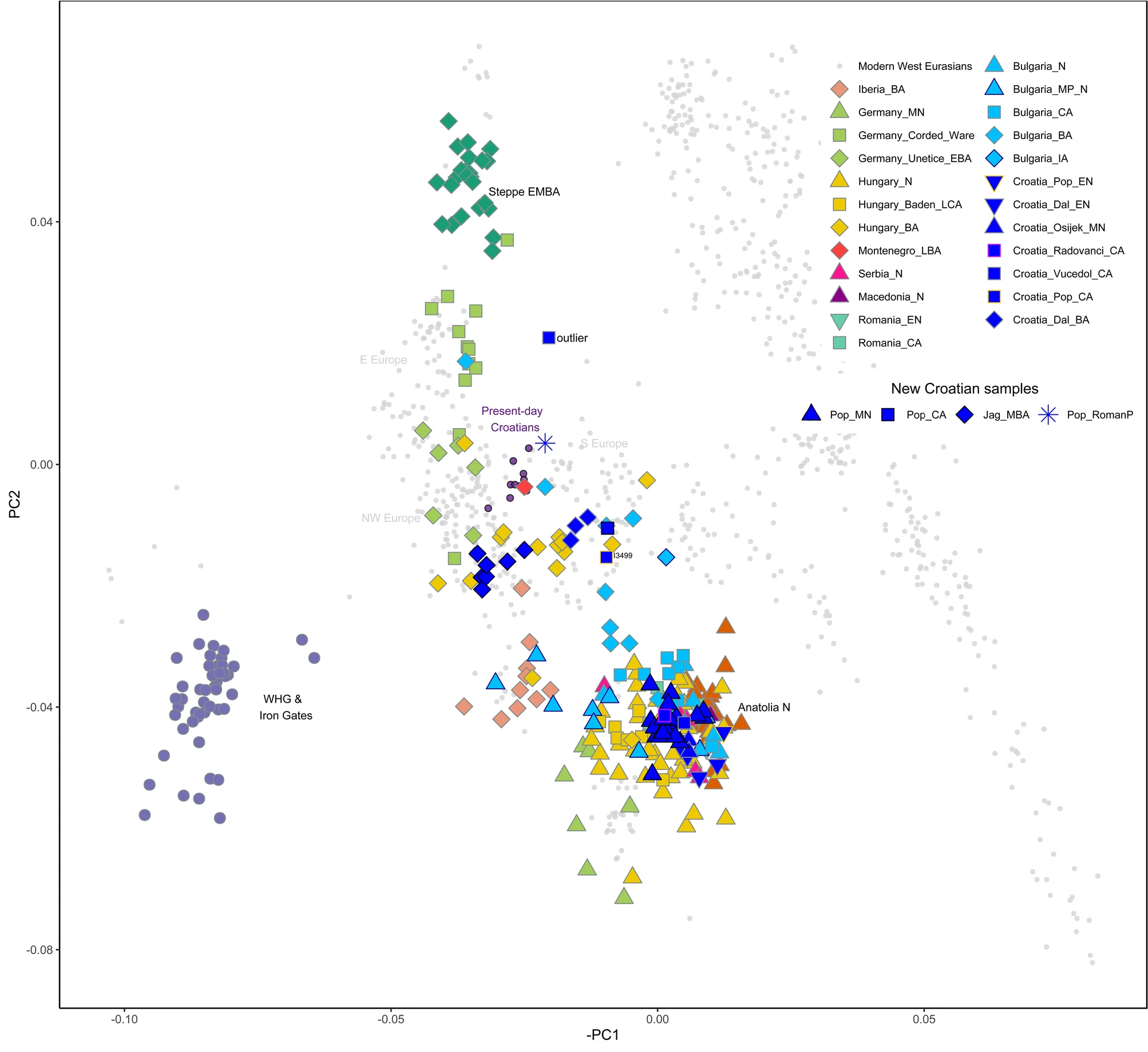
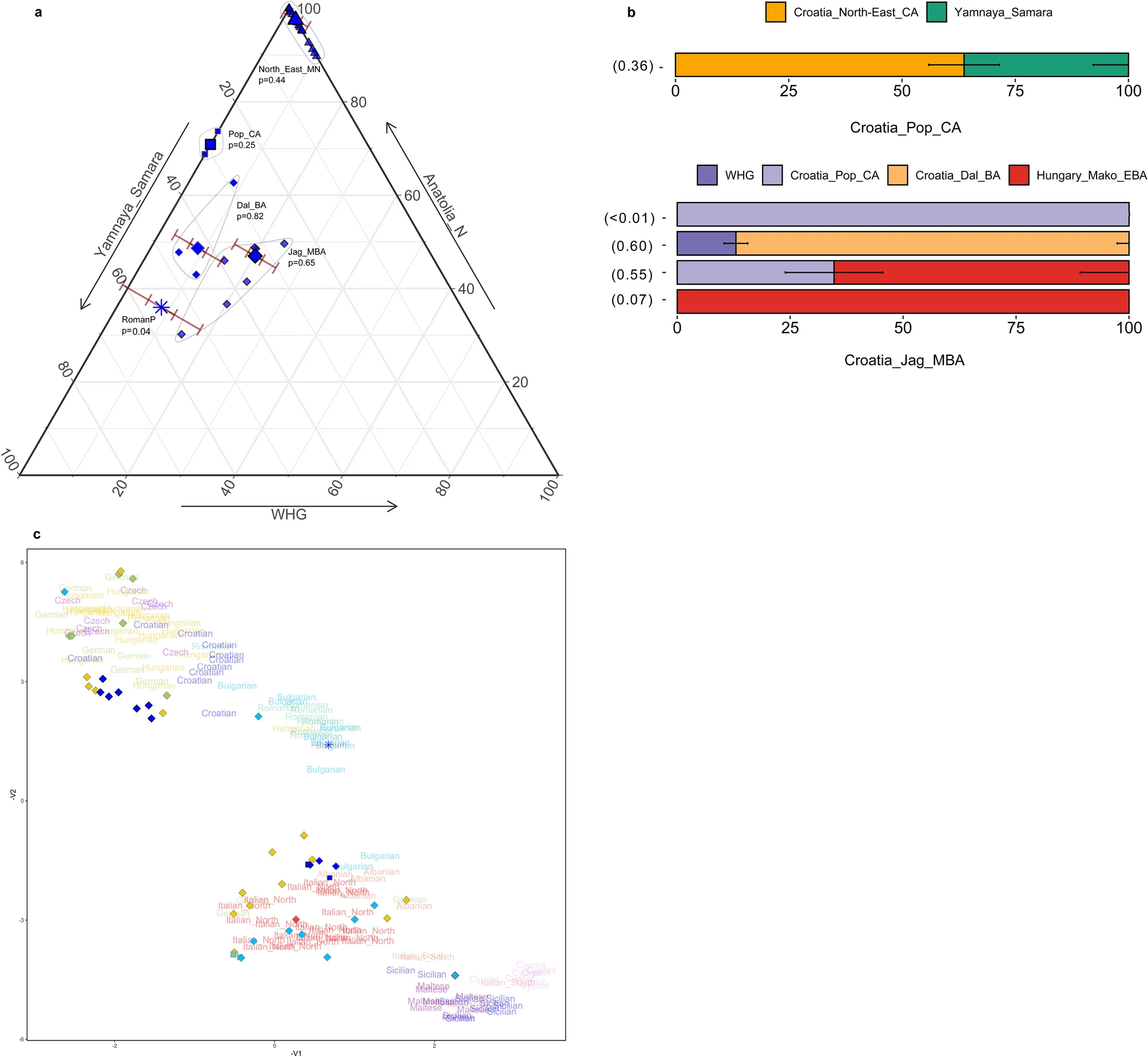
West Eurasian PCA's, Admixture and genetic affinities of ancient and modern Croatian genomes, per Freilich, Ringbauer, Los et al. 2021.

In the 2014 study, of the three successfully generated SNP profiles of Neolithic Starčevo culture samples from Vinkovci, two belonged to Y-DNA haplogroup G2a-P15 and one to I2a1-P37.2, which could indicate G2a as a potential representative of the spread of farming from the Near East to Europe, while I2a as a Mesolithic substratum in Europe. In the 2018 study, 10 out of 17 samples from Croatia had a successful Y-DNA sequencing; two Croatia Cardial Neolithic (6005–5786 BCE) samples from Zemunica Cave belonged to C1a2 and E1b1b1a1b1, Early-Neolithic Starčevo culture (5837–5659 BCE) from Beli Manastir-Popova zemlja to C, Early-Neolithic Croatia Impressa culture (5641–5560 BCE) from Kargadur to G2a2a1, two Middle-Neolithic Sopot culture (5207–4546 BCE) samples from Osijek to G2a2a1 and J2a1, Late-Neolithic Sopot (4790–4558 BCE) from Beli Manastir-Popova zemlja to I, two Vučedol culture (2884–2582 BCE) samples from Beli Manastir-Popova zemlja and Vučedol Tell to R1b1a1a2a2 and G2a2a1a2a, and the Early-Middle Bronze Age (1631–1521 BCE) sample from Veliki Vanik belonged to J2b2a.

In the 2021, was made a genome-wide analysis on 38 out of 41 individuals from the 6200 years old massacre at village Potočani in Eastern Croatia. They belonged to the Middle Copper Age Lasinja culture, and autosomally 70% of them were not in close kinship implying "a community composed of many family groups". According to Admixture and PCA it revealed "that the analyzed individuals are slightly shifted from the Anatolia Neolithic cluster in the direction of Western European hunter-gatherers, similar to other Middle to Late Neolithic European farmers before the arrival of [Western] steppe ancestry", as on average had approximately 91% Anatolian Neolithic Farmers (ANF) and 9% Western Hunter-Gatherer (WHG)-related ancestry, being very distant from modern Croats. Among them were present "paternal lineages typical of Balkan Neolithic populations (eleven G2a2, two I2a1a(xI2a1a2), one I2a2, C and C1a2-V20)".

In the same year were analyzed additional 19 Middle Neolithic of Sopot culture, 1 Copper Age and 1 Roman age sample from Beli Manastir-Popova zemlja as well as 7 Bronze Age samples of Transdanubian Encrusted Pottery culture from Jagodnjak-Krčevine in Eastern Croatia. According to Admixture, Croatian Neolithic samples have 97.6-100% ANF-ancestry, Copper Age samples have 71% ANF-ancestry and 29% Western Steppe Herders (WSH)-ancestry, while Bronze Age samples 47% ANF, 20% WHG and 33% WSG-ancestry. The observed Y-DNA haplogroups in the Neolithic/Copper period were two G2a2a-PF3147, one G2a2b2a1a1-PF3345, one C1a2b-Z38888, two I2a2a-M223 and one J-M304; in the Bronze period were only four G2a2a1a2a2a1-Z31430 and one G2a2a1-PF3148. The one Roman period individual from 260 to 402 CE, "who may or may not be representative for the wider population in that time period", had an autosomal genetic combination very similar to present-day Southeastern Europeans (including Croats), "adding an important data point to the substantial shift in ancestry that occurred in the region between the Bronze Age and today". He carried Scythian-Eurasian Y-DNA haplogroup R1a1a1b2a2-Z2124 > R1a1a1b2a2b1-F1345 (R-F1019* subclade). Between 2018 and 2022 studies analyzed many samples related to the Cetina culture, Proto-Illyrians and specific Illyrian tribes (Iapydes and Liburni), finding that their paternal lineage almost exclusively belonged to the J2b-L283 haplogroup. Two years later, a study was published on 33 ancient samples from the 3rd to 5th centuries from the island of Hvar, and they had Y-DNA haplogroups, in order of frequency, J2a, E1b, J2b, and G2a.

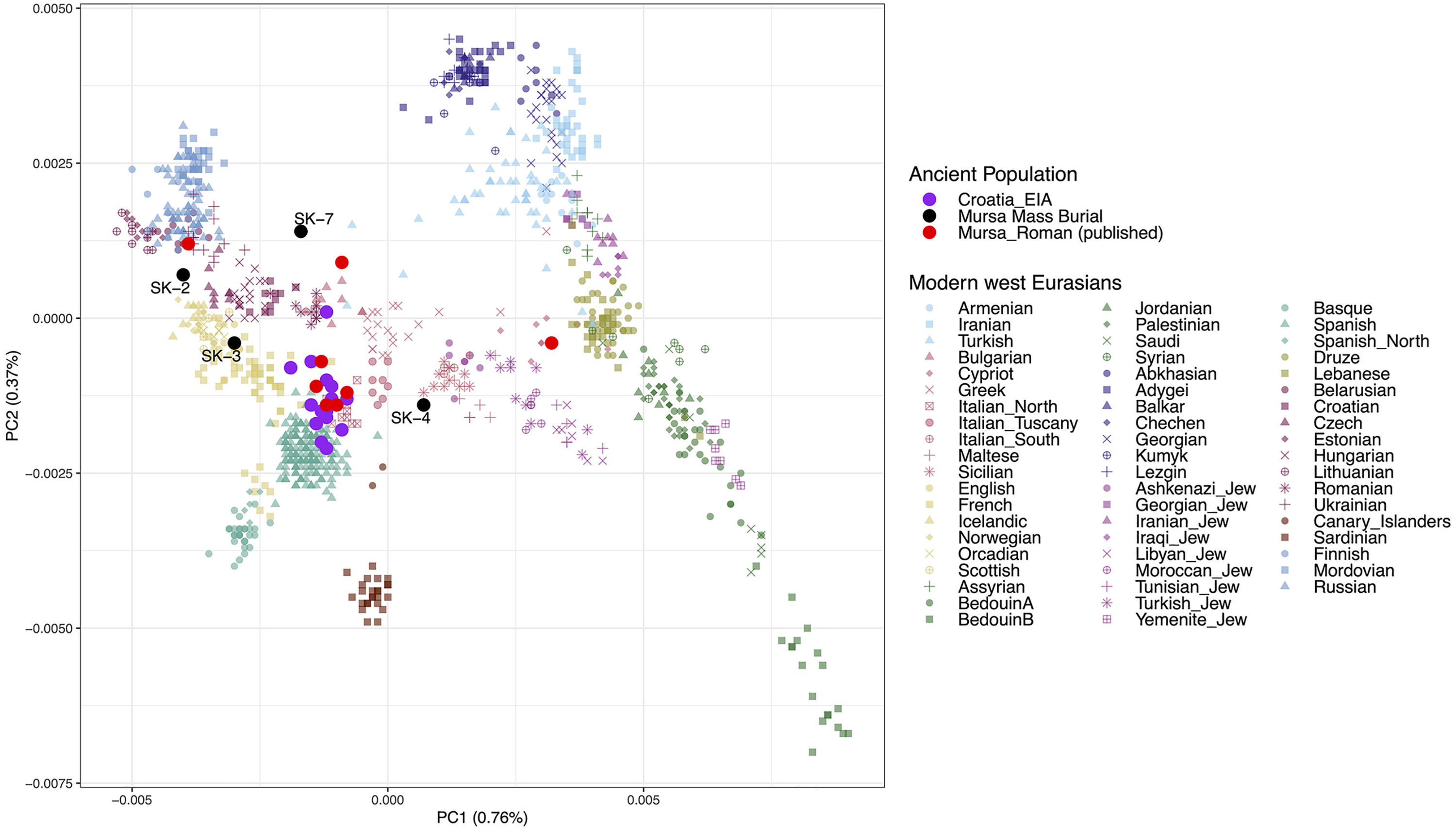
West Eurasian PCA's, Admixture and genetic affinities of Roman-age Mursa, Croatian Iron Ages and modern Croatian genomes, per Novak et al. 2025.

In 2025 seven 3rd-century males from Roman period Mursa (today's Osijek) were analyzed, Roman soldiers but "none of them show genetic continuity with the preceding local Early Iron Age population", with their Y-DNA haplogroups being N1a-L550, R1b-S497, I2a-M223 > L701, and I1a-Z63 > S2077. In 2019 were autosomally analyzed three 5th-century individuals with artificial cranial deformation from Osijek, probably of Hunnic or Germanic origin. According to Principal component analysis and Admixture methods, one of them had East/Northeast Asian, another European/Caucasian, and the third Near Middle Eastern/North African ancestry.

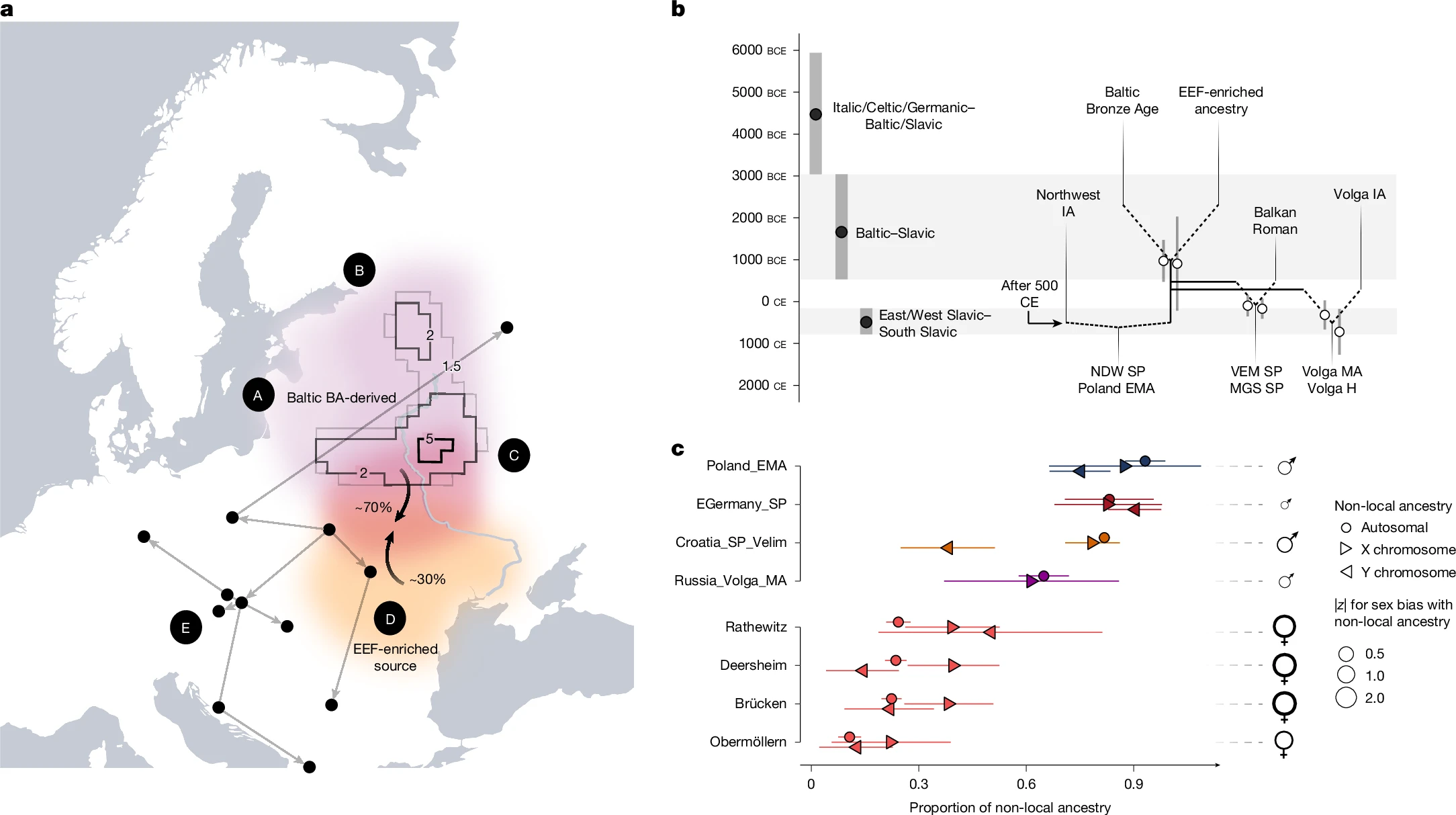
Formation, and putative migration directions of the Slavs during the migration period, per Gretzinger et al. 2025.

A 2022 archaeogenetic study published in Science compared ancient, medieval, and modern Balkans population samples and found that the medieval Slavic migrations "profoundly affected the region", resulting in the reduction of Anatolian Neolithic ancestry in Southeastern Europe. Pre-Slavic Balkan populations have the most of the Anatolian Neolithic component of ancestry, whereas present-day Slavs outside the Balkans have the least, "with present-day people from Southeastern Europe", including Croats, "intermediate between the two extremes", with Greeks and Albanians having the most while Croats and Hungarians the least. A 2023 archaeogenetic study published in Cell confirmed that the spread of Slavic language and identity was because of large movements of people of both males and females with specific Eastern European ancestry and that "more than half of the ancestry of most peoples in the Balkans today comes from the Slavic migrations, with around a third Slavic ancestry even in countries like Greece where no Slavic languages are spoken today". The pre-Slavic period population of Croatia and the region had Y-DNA haplogroups E-V13, R1b, J2b, J2a, G2a while with Slavic migration arrived R1a-Z282 and I2a-L621 among others. The most comprehensive archaeogenetic study until now about the origin and spread of the early Slavs, published 2025 in Nature including 115 samples from pre-Slavic and Slavic period in Croatia, confirmed previous conclusions.

=== Contemporary Y-DNA ===
Genetically, on the paternal Y chromosome line and studies published between 2003 and 2008, a majority (>75%) of male Croats from Croatia belongs to one of the three major European Y-DNA haplogroups – I2 (32%-34%), R1a (27%-34%) and R1b (12%-15%), while a minority (>25%) belongs to haplogroups E (9%), I1 (5%-9%), J (4%), N (2%), and G (1%). According to recent and more extensive studies published between 2012 and 2022, a majority (65%) of male Croats from Croatia belongs to haplogroups I2 (39%-40%) and R1a (22%-24%), while a minority (35%) belongs to haplogroups E (10%), R1b (6%-7%), J (6%-7%), I1 (5-8%), G (2%), Q (0-1.93%), H (0-1.8%), T (0.6%), N (0-0.6%) and L (0.2%).

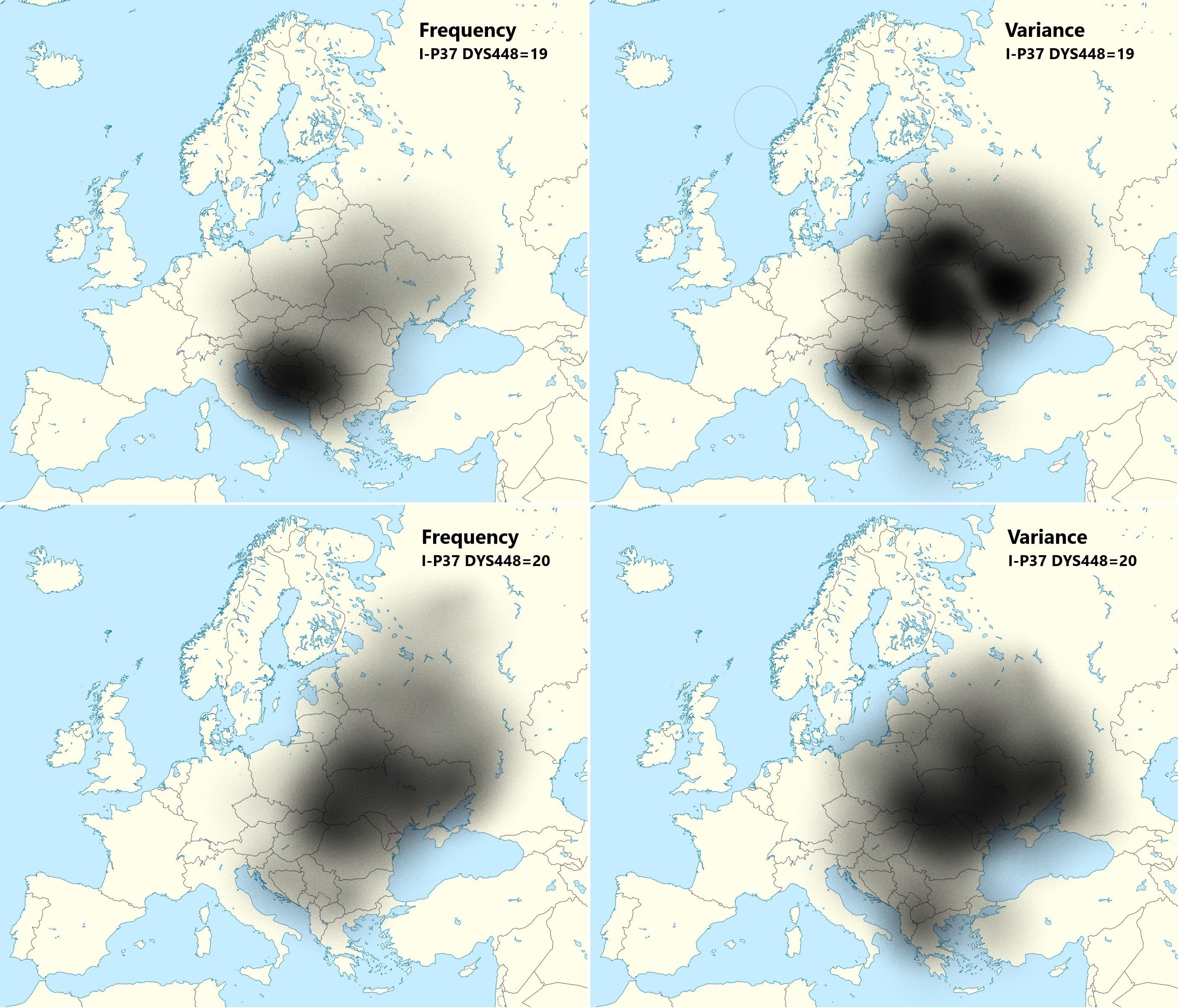
The approximate frequency and variance distribution of haplogroup I-P37 clusters, ancestral "Dnieper-Carpathian" (DYS448=20) and derived "Balkan" (DYS448=19: represented by a single SNP I-PH908), in Eastern Europe per O.M. Utevska (2017).

Haplogroup I among Croats from Croatia is around 43.5%, while in Šokci, a subgroup of Croats from eastern Croatia, is between 44% and 50% of the same haplogroup. It is divided in two major subdivisions – subclade I2 (37.7%), typical for the populations of the Balkans and Eastern Europe, and I1 (5.8%), typical for the populations of Scandinavia. From the I2 subclade, the most prevailing is I2a1a (I-P37.2) i.e. its subclade lineage I-M423 (18,400-14,000 YBP) > I-Y3104 (14,000-11,400 YBP) > I2a1a2b-L621 (11,400-6,500 YBP) > I-CTS10936 (6,500-5,600 YBP) > I-S19848 (5,600 YBP) > I-CTS4002 (5,600-5,100 YBP) > I-CTS10228 (5,100-3,400 YBP) > I-Y3120 (3,400-2,100 YBP) > I-S17250 (2,100-1,850 YBP) > I-PH908 (1,850-1,700 YBP), which is typical of the South Slavic populations of Southeastern Europe, being highest in Bosnia-Herzegovina (>50%). In Croatia the highest frequency is observed in Dalmatia, peaking in cities of Split (50.48%), Dubrovnik (53%) and Zadar (60%), as well southern Adriatic islands of Vis (44.6%), Brač and Korčula (~55%), and Hvar (52.88-65%). It is around average in the cities of Pula (31.31%) and Osijek (27.6-40.91%), some southern Mljet (33.3%), Lastovo (33.3%) and middle Adriatic islands of Pašman (37.2%) and Pag (36.4%). The frequency is lowest in the town of Varaždin (18%) in northwestern Croatia, in the western mountainous Žumberak region (18.2%), and in the middle-northern islands of Cres (3%), Dugi otok (11.4%), Ugljan (24.6%) and Krk (27%). The highest frequency is found in Croats of Bosnia and Herzegovina (63.8-73.3%). Based on 8 STR marker genetic distances closest are populations of near countries, but also depending on method, Ukraine, Belarus, Poland and Russia. The subclade's I-P37.2 very high frequency in the Western Balkans diminishes in all directions. The population with haplogroup I migrated to Europe from the Middle East, approximately 25,000-13,000 years ago. It represents the Paleolithic and Mesolithic population of hunter gatherers in Europe. However, in comparison to older research which argued a prehistoric autochthonous origin of the contemporary haplogroup I2 in Croatia and the Balkans, (Note: The SNP I-P37 itself formed approximately 20 thousand YBP and had TMRCA 18 thousand YBP according to YFull, being too old and widespread as an SNP for argumentation of autochthony as well the old research used outdated nomenclature. According to "I-P37 (I2a)" project at Family Tree DNA, the divergence at STR marker DYS448 20 > 19 is reported since 2007, while the SNP which defines the STR Dinaric-South cluster, I-PH908, is reported since 2014. The SNP I-PH908 at ISOGG phylogenetic tree is named as I2a1a2b1a1a1c, while formed and had TMRCA approximately 1,800 YBP according to YFull.) Battaglia et al. (2009) already observed highest variance of the haplogroup in Ukraine, and Zupan et al. (2013) noted that it suggests it arrived with Slavic migration from the homeland which was in present-day Ukraine. The recent research by O.M. Utevska (2017), concluded that the haplogroup STR haplotypes have the highest diversity in Ukraine, with ancestral STR marker result "DYS448=20" comprising "Dnieper-Carpathian" cluster, while younger derived result "DYS448=19" comprising the "Balkan cluster" which is predominant among the South Slavs. This "Balkan cluster" also has the highest variance in Ukraine, which indicates that the very high frequency in the Western Balkan is because of a founder effect. Utevska calculated that the STR cluster divergence and its secondary expansion from the middle reaches of the Dnieper river or from Eastern Carpathians towards the Balkan peninsula happened approximately 2,860 ± 730 years ago, relating it to the times before Slavs, but much after the decline of the Tripolye culture. However, STR-based calculations give overestimated dates, and more specifically, the cluster is represented by a single SNP, I-PH908, known as I2a1a2b1a1a1c in ISOGG phylogenetic tree (2019), and according to YFull YTree it formed and had TMRCA approximately 1,850-1,700 YBP. Although the haplogroup I2-CTS10228 is dominant among the modern Slavic peoples on the territory of the former Balkan provinces of the Roman Empire, until now it was not found among the samples from the Roman period and is almost absent in contemporary population of Italy. According to Pamjav et al. (2019) and Fóthi et al. (2020), the distribution of ancestral subclades like of I-CTS10228 among contemporary carriers indicates a rapid expansion from Southeastern Poland, is mainly related to the Slavs and their medieval migration, and the "largest demographic explosion occurred in the Balkans". According to Olalde et al. (2023) and Gretzinger et al. (2025) it is confirmed that I2-L621>CTS10228 was absent before the medieval period in the Balkans and arrived with the Slavs.

R1a1a1-M17 (22.1%-25.6%) is the second most prevailing haplogroup. The haplogroup R-M17 in Croatia is mostly divided into two main subclades, R-Z282 > R-M558 which is predominant (19.2%), and R-Z282 > R-M458 (4.9%), while the rare remnants (1.2%) belong to R-Z282* (like R-Z93 and else). It has highest frequency in northern (29.1%) and central (23.6%) region, and almost the same frequency in eastern (18.6%), southern (19.1%), and western (20%) region of Croatia. The highest local frequency of R1a1a1-M17 was observed in the Croats from Varaždin (38%) and Osijek (26-39%), Žumberak (34.1), and in the middle-northern islands of Dugi Otok (34.1%), Krk (37%), Pašman (38%) and Cres (56.6%), being similar to the values of the other Slavs, like Slovenes, Czechs and Slovaks. The frequency is lower in Šokci from eastern Croatia (16%), in the city of Dubrovnik (13.4%) and Split (19%) in Dalmatia, as well on the southern islands of Hvar (8-10.58%) and Vis (17%). In Bosnian Croats, the frequency is similar to those of other South Slavs (12%). Considering subclades, the only outlier is island of Cres which had almost equal percentage of R1a-M558 (29.3%) and R1a-M458 (27.3%). Based on 8 STR marker genetic distances closest are populations of near countries, but also depending on method, Belarus, Slovakia, Poland and Russia. The R-M558 subclade is more frequent among East Slavs in Eastern Europe and Volga-Ural region, while R-M458 among West Slavs in Central and Eastern Europe. Both are present in "informative frequencies in Balkan populations with known Slavonic heritage". R-M558 subclade CTS1211 was also found among Hungarian conquerors which indicates mixing and assimilation of the Slavs among the Hungarians.

The highest frequency of the haplogroup Haplogroup R1b (7.9%-9.1%), which in Croatia is divided into several subclades (mainly R-L23 and its subclade R-U152), has in northern (10.9%) and central (11.8%) region of Croatia, while locally in the Croats from the island of Krk (16.2%) and Dugi Otok (25%), and Žumberak (11.3%), while in the southern islands, city of Dubrovnik (3.9%) and in Bosnian Croats it is almost absent (1-6%), or like in Osijek it was not found. These two haplogroups (R1a and R1b) are connected to Proto-Indo-Europeans migration from the Eurasian area some 5,000 years ago, with R1a particularly to Slavic population's migration. Their frequency show north–south gradiation and an opposite frequency distribution to the haplogroup I-P37.2, and the highest frequency is observed in the northern, central and eastern Croatia.

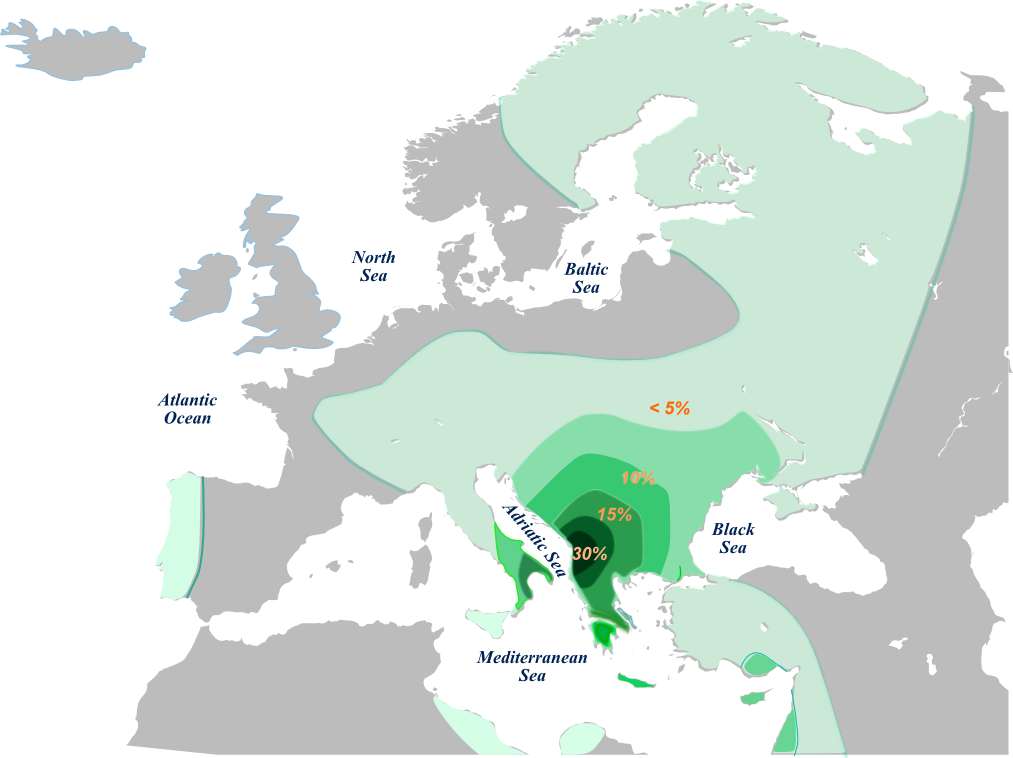
The distribution of haplogroup E-V13 in Europe.

From the haplogroup E (9.8%-10.6%) among Croats the most frequent is subclade E1b1b1a1b-V13 (6.7%), while E1b1b1a3-M149 and E1b1b1c-M123 were also found in small numbers (1.1%). E-V13 it's typical of the populations of south-eastern Europe, peaking among Kosovo Albanians (44%), and is also high among the Macedonians, Greeks, Romanians, Bulgarians and Serbs. The highest frequency in Croatian mainland has been found in Varaždin (16%) and Žumberak (18.2%) in central islands Dugi Otok (15.9%) and Ugljan (13.2%), as well southern islands Vis (23.4%) and Mljet (15.4%). In the northern islands of Cres (3%) and Krk (6.8%) was similar to other southern islands (3.7-4.3%). In Bosnian Croats the frequency was the same as among the Croats from Croatia (8.9%). Subclades of J1 are rare in Croatia, while J2 are higher in Croats from Croatia, peaking in Croats from Osijek (10.2%) and central islands Ugljan (10.2%) and Pašman (16.6%) as well the northern island of Krk (10.8%) and Cres (14.1%), than in Bosnian Croats (both 1.1%). Subclade G2a-P15 both in Croatian and Bosnian Croats is found in low numbers (1.1%), but peaks locally in the north-eastern town of Osijek (13.8%), and the southern islands of Mljet (15.4%), Korčula (10.4%), Brač (6%) as well northern island Cres (7%). The haplogroup E and J are related to post-LGM, Neolithic migration of a population from Anatolia who brought with them domestication of wild animals and plants. Specifically, the haplogroup E's subclade probably arose locally in the Balkan not earlier than 8,000-10,000 years ago. These haplogroups show south–north gradiation. The haplogroup G could have been present in Europe during the LGM or population with some of its subclades arrived with early farmers.

Haplogroup's N subclades are rare in Croatia (0-2.2%). It is very frequent in the Far East, like Siberia and China, while in Europe in Finns (60%) and in the Baltic countries (45%). Unusually for European populations, another central Asian-Siberian haplogroup Q was found in unusually high frequencies due to founder effect in the islands of Hvar (7.69-14%), Lastovo (8.3%) and Korčula (6%). It was also found in an individual from Herzegovina. In later studies, a Croatian from Bosnia and Herzegovina was confirmed to belong to the subclade Q-L472>Z2902>B285>B29 found in Central-East Asia, while a Croatian from Croatia, another one from the island of Hvar, and a Croatian of Jewish origin in Poland belonged to the subclade Q-L245>Y2998>Y2209 which is mostly found in the Middle East and Ashkenazi Jews.

=== Abstract and data ===
The region of modern-day Croatia was part of a wider Balkan region which may have served as one of several refugia during the LGM, a source region for the recolonization of Europe during the post-glacial period and Holocene (10,000 years ago). The eastern Adriatic coast was much further south. The northern and the western parts of that sea were steppes and plains, while the modern Croatian islands (rich in Paleolithic archeological sites) were hills and mountains. The region had a specific role in the structuring of European, and particularly among Slavic, paternal genetic heritage, characterized by the predominance of R1a and I, and scarcity of E lineages. The contemporary insular population's genetic diversity is characterized by strong isolation and endogamy.

In the table below is cited the most extensive study (2012) until now on the population in Croatia. It is a national reference DNA database of 17 loci system which acquired Y-STR haplotypes were predicted in estimated (over 90% probability) Y-SNP haplogroups. The sub-populations were divided in five regions which sub-populations showed strong similarity and homogeneity of paternal genetic contribution, all clustering together, with exception of sub-population from southern Croatia who showed a mild difference. In addition to high degree of overall homogeneity, there are gradient similarities to a central European cluster (Germanic, Slavic, Hungarian), and a southern European cluster (Bosnian, Serbian, Bulgarian, Macedonian, Romanian, Albanian, South Italian), going from north to south (and east to west). Out of the neighboring countries and ethnic peoples are closest to them Bosnia and Herzegovina and Bosniaks.

Population	Samples	Source	I2a(xI2a1)	R1a	E1b1b1-M35	R1b	I1	J2b	G2a	H	J2a1h	J1	J2a1b	E1b1a1-M2	G1	G2c	I2a1	I2b1	I2b(xI2b1)	J2a1-bh	L	N	Q	T
Overall Croatia	1,100	Mršić et al. (2012)	37.7% (415/1100)	22.1% (243/1100)	10.6% (117/1100)	7.9% (87/1100)	5.8% (64/1100)	3.7% (41/1100)	2.7% (30/1100)	1.8% (20/1100)	1.2% (13/1100)	1.1% (12/1100)	1% (11/1100)	0.1%	0	0.1%	0.1%	0.9%	0.3%	0.3%	0.2%	0.6%	0.7%	0.6%
Central Croatia	220	Mršić et al. (2012)	31.8% (70/220)	23.6% (52/220)	11.8% (26/220)	10.4% (23/220)	5% (11/220)	5% (11/220)	3.6% (8/220)	1.3% (3/220)	0.4% (1/220)	2.2% (5/220)	0.9% (2/220)	0	0	0	0.4%	0.9%	0.9%	0	0.4%	0.9%	0	0
North Croatia	220	Mršić et al. (2012)	25.4% (56/220)	29.1% (64/220)	10.9% (24/220)	10.4% (23/220)	4.1% (9/220)	5% (11/220)	3.1% (7/220)	5% (11/220)	0.4% (1/220)	0	0.4% (1/220)	0.4%	0	0	0	2.2%	0.9%	0	0.4%	0.4%	0	1.3%
East; Croatia	220	Mršić et al. (2012)	40% (88/220)	18.6% (41/220)	11.3% (25/220)	8.2% (18/220)	5.9% (13/220)	2.7% (6/220)	1.8% (4/220)	0.9% (2/220)	2.2% (5/220)	2.7% (6/220)	1.3% (3/220)	0	0	0	0	0.4%	0	0.4%	0	0.9%	1.8%	0.4%
West Croatia	220	Mršić et al. (2012)	36.8% (81/220)	20% (44/220)	12.7% (28/220)	5.9% (13/220)	8.6% (19/220)	3.2% (7/220)	3.2% (7/220)	1.8% (4/220)	1.8% (4/220)	0.4% (1/220)	1.8% (4/220)	0	0	0.4%	0	0.4%	0	0.4%	0	0.9%	0.4%	0.9%
South Croatia	220	Mršić et al. (2012)	54.5% (120/220)	19.1% (42/220)	6.3% (14/220)	4.5% (10/220)	5.4% (12/220)	2.7% (6/220)	1.8% (4/220)	0.4% (1/220)	0.9% (2/220)	0	0.4% (1/220)	0	0	0	0	0.4%	0	0.9%	0.4%	0	1.3%	0.4%
Zagreb & Croatia	239	Purps et al. (2014)	36.1%	23.8%	6.4%	13.9%	3.9%	2.1%	n/a	n/a	1.9%	0.9%	n/a	n/a	0	n/a	n/a	n/a	n/a	n/a	n/a	n/a	n/a	n/a
Croatia	720	Šarac et al. (2016)	32.5%	25.6%	9.8%	9.1%	4.1%	5.0%	4.4%	0.3%	2.7%	0.5%	1.0%	0.4%	0	0	0.3%	0.8%	0.5%	1.0%	0	0.6%	0.9%	1.2%
Croatia	518	Primorac et al. (2022)	39%	24.32%	10.81%	6.37%	7.14%	2.12%	1.93%	0	3.47% (J2a)	0.58%	n/a	0	0.19%	n/a	1.35% (I2b)	n/a	n/a	n/a	0.19%	0	1.93%	0.58%
West Herzegovina (Croats)	141	Peričić et al. (2005)	63.8%	12%	8.5%	3.5%	4.9%	0.7%	n/a	n/a	n/a	n/a	n/a	n/a	n/a	n/a	n/a	n/a	n/a	n/a	n/a	n/a	0.7%	n/a
Bosnia and Herzegovina (Croats)	119	Kovačević et al. (2014)	69.8%	11.8%	10.9%	2.5%	0	0.8%	0.8%	n/a	0.8%	n/a	n/a	n/a	n/a	n/a	n/a	n/a	n/a	n/a	n/a	n/a	n/a	n/a

== Mitochondrial DNA ==
=== Ancient mtDNA ===
In the 2014 Y-DNA and mtDNA study, one Mesolithic sample dated 6080–6020 BCE from Vela Spila near Vela Luka on island Korčula belonged to mtDNA haplogroup U5b2a5 common in hunter-gatherer communities, while other eleven Neolithic Starčevo culture samples dated circa 6000–5400 BCE from Vinkovci were assigned haplogroups J1c, K1a, T2b, HV0, K, V, V6, which reveal similar mtDNA diversity and shared ancestry in early farming populations from the Pannonian Basin and the populations of the Central European LBK, accompanied by a reduction of the Mesolithic mtDNA substratum. Preliminary results from 2016 mtDNA study, which will approximately include 30 samples from Neolithic and 5 samples from Early to Late Bronze Age, on 5 ancient Croatian petrous bones (3 Neolithic Cardial Impresso from Zemunica Cave near Bisko, 1 Middle Neolithic Danilo culture from Zidana Cave near Staničići Žumberački, 1 Mid/Late Bronze Age from Jazinka Cave near Nečven) indicated mtDNA haplogroups K2 and K1b1a, H1e/H41, H1b for Neolithic samples similar to Early European Farmers (EEFs) and modern Sardinians and Southern Europeans, while haplogroup HV or H4 for Bronze Age sample similar to modern day Croatian and Balkan population, but without clear evidence for connection with the Indo-European migration. The 2018 study which included 17 samples from Croatia; Mesolithic (7308–7027 BCE) from Vela Spila to U5b2b, three Croatia Cardial Neolithic (6005–5751 BCE) samples from Zemunica Cave to H1, K1b1a and N1a1, Early-Neolithic Starčevo (5837–5659 BCE) from Beli Manastir-Popova zemlja to U8b1b1, two Early-Neolithic Croatia Impressa (5670–5560 BCE) samples from Kargadur to H5a and H7c, two Middle-Neolithic Sopot (5207–4546 BCE) samples from Osijek to U5a1a2 and H10, two Late-Neolithic Sopot (4790–4536 BCE) samples from Beli Manastir-Popova zemlja to U5b2b and N1a1, Eneolithic (3710–3360 BCE) from Radovanci to J1c2, three Vučedol (3000–2582 BCE) samples from Beli Manastir-Popova zemlja and Vucedol Tell to T2e, T2c2 and U4a, Early-Middle Bronze Age (1631–1521 BCE) from Veliki Vanik to I1a1, and the Late Bronze Age (805–761 BCE) sample from Jazinka Cave belonged to HV0e. The 2021 study included 38 Neolithic (4200 BCE) samples from Potočani in Eastern Croatia and belonged to H, H4a1, H5b, H7, H13b1, H26, H42, HV, J1, K1a1, K1a3a, K1a4a1, K1b1b1, N1a1a1, N1a1a1a2, N1a1a1a3, T1a2, T2b, T2b23, T2f, U2, U5b1d1 and X2b, "suggesting that the Potočani victims belonged to a large community with a diverse pool of female lineages". In the same year study of 28 samples from Neolithic up to Roman times in Eastern Croatia found H, HV9, J2b1a5, K1a, K1a1, K1a1a, K1a4, K1a5, K1b1b1, K2a, K2b1, N1a1a1, N1a1a1a2, N1a1a1a3, T2b, T2b11, T2b21, T2b3, T2c1d1, T2f2, U2e1a1, U5a1g, U5b1b1a, U5b2b, U8b1a1.

The 2011 mtDNA study on 27 early medieval skeletal remains in Naklice near Omiš in Southern Dalmatia showed that 67% belonged to haplogroup H, 18% to J, 11% to U5, and 4% to HV. The 2015 mtDNA study on medieval skeletal remains in Šopot (14th-15th century) and Ostrovica (9th century) in Northern Dalmatia confirmed that profiles inherited by the maternal line differed neither between Ostrovica and Šopot site nor between medieval and modern populations, showing the same haplogroup prevalence (H, J, U) in both medieval and contemporary populations. The 2014 study of a male skeleton found in Split from Late Roman Period (dated 1760±80 YBP) showed that it belonged to haplogroup H.

=== Contemporary mtDNA ===
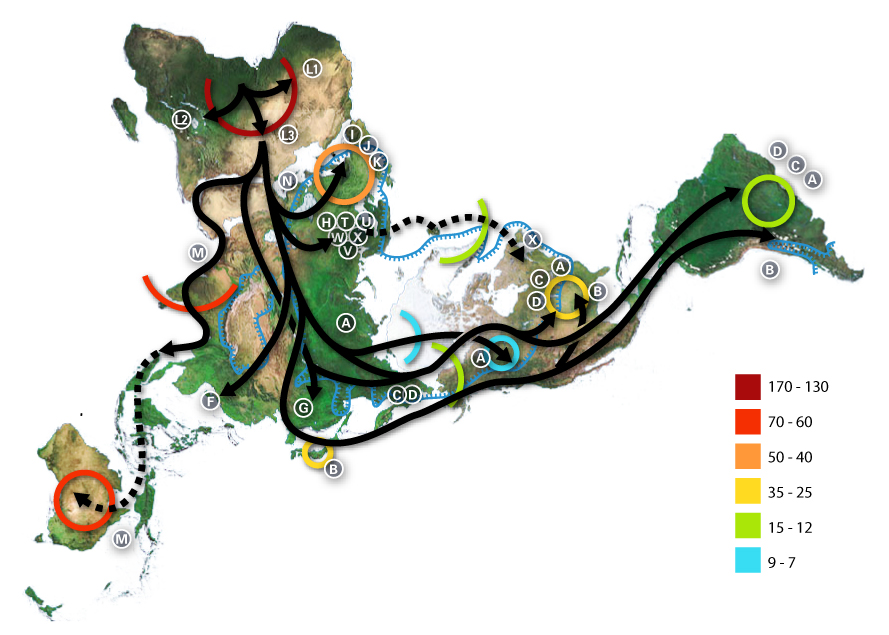
The mtDNA haplogroups hypothetical Out of Africa migrations in thousand of years before present.

Genetically, on the maternal mitochondrial DNA line, a majority (>65%) of Croats from Croatia (mainland and coast) belong to three of the eleven major European mtDNA haplogroups – H (25.5-45%), U (18.85-22%), J (7.5-11%), while a large minority (>35%) belongs to many other smaller haplogroups.

In all the studies, haplogroup H is the most frequent (45% in 2014) maternal haplogroup in Croatian mainland (continental) and coast respectively, but in most recent 2020 study is at lower frequencies of 25.5% due to nomenclature differences primarily of R/R0 (7.5%) lineages. The highest frequency in Croatia observed in population of island Korčula (60.2%), Susak (66%) and Mljet (73.5%), while lowest frequency in islands Cres (27.7%), and Hvar (27.8%). It is the dominant European haplogroup. The elevated frequency of subhaplogroup H1b in Mljet (30.9%), otherwise rare in other studies, is a typical example of a founder effect – migration from the nearest coastal region and micro-evolutionary expansion in the island.

Haplogroup U (18.85% in 2014, 22% in 2020) is mostly represented by its subclade U5 which is the second most frequent haplogroup, with 11.6% in the mainland and 10.4% in the coast, with similar frequencies in the islands of Brač (8.6%), Krk (11.3%), and Hvar (14.8%), while lowest in Korčula (2%). Overall the haplogroup U, including its subclades like U5, is the most frequent in the city of Dubrovnik (19.9%) and islands Lastovo (23.5%) and Cres (29.4%). It is the oldest European haplogroup (coalescence age circa 50,000 YBP) and its subclade U5 makes the majority of the haplogroup diversity in Europe. The high frequency of U4 in Lastovo (11.8%) indicates founder effect.

Haplogroup J is the third most frequent haplogroup (7.5% in 2020), with 11.9% in the mainland but only 3.1% in the coast, however the islands had higher frequencies than the coastal population Korčula (6.1%), Brač (8.6%), Krk (9%), Hvar (9.3%), peak in Žumberak (12.34%) and Lastovo (19.6%), while in Cres is almost totally absent.

Haplogroup T is third or fourth most frequent haplogroup (10% in 2020). Its subclade T2 has similar frequency of 3.1-5.8% in both the coastal and mainland as well insular population, with exceptional peak in island Hvar (12%), and Susak (33%), however the overall haplogroup T has lower frequency in Mljet (1.5%), Lastovo (3.9%) and Dubrovnik (2.3).

Haplogroup K (7.5% in 2020) has average frequency of 3.6% in the mainland and 6.3% in the coast, it is absent in Lastovo and it has lowest frequency in the islands Cres (3.36%) and Hvar (3.7%), while highest in the island Brač (9.5%).

Haplogroup V (under HV > HV0) is a younger sister clade of haplogroup H, and has almost the same minimum and maximum frequency (4-5.7%) in both continental and insular populations, with exception in Korčula (8.2%), as well lower frequency in Mljet (1.5%), Lastovo (2%) and Dubrovnik (3.3%).

Haplogroup W frequency in the mainland and coastal population is between 2.2 and 4.2%, while between insular populations 1.9-3.1%, with exception in Krk (7.5%), and Cres (12.6%). In islands Mljet and Lastovo is between 4.4 and 5.9%, while in Dubrovnik is almost absent (0.6%).

Other mtDNA haplogroup with notable local peaks are: HV subclades with low frequencies in the mainland and coast (0.4-2.1%) but average (4.1-4.6) in islands, and high in Dubrovnik (7.7%) and Brač (10.5%). Haplogroup N1a in Cres (9.24%) is the northernmost finding till now of this branch in Europe, and haplotypes indicate a relatively recent founder effect. It is a characteristic haplogroup of the early farmers. Haplogroup F which is almost absent (only 0.2-0.4% in the mainland), but peaks at 8.3% in Hvar. Haplogroup I in Krk (11.3%), which subhaplogroups separated around the LGM. Haplogroup X ranges 0.63-3.17%, mainly belonging to subclade X2 > X2b, and recent research of Cres and Rab possibly found a "new, island-specific" X3 lineage which "formed within the Croatian population".

=== Abstract and data ===
For decades the Croatian insular populations have been studied because of their isolation which can trace micro-evolutionary processes and understand evolutionary forces, like genetic drift (specific genetic expression), founder effect and population bottlenecks (reduction of population size) which shaped the contemporary population. The results until now indicate that the genetic flow and influx of women to the islands was limited. A moderate genetic isolate can also be considered for the continental population of mountainous region Žumberak because they had a loose affinity with Uskoks's proposed region of origin (Bosnians, Herzegovinians, southern Croatians) or to their current closest neighbors (northern Croatians and Slovenians). On the example of population of the island of Krk, the high-resolution mtDNA analysis showed evidence that settlements Omišalj, Vrbnik, and Dobrinj are related in a joint cluster of early Slavic settlements, while Poljica and Dubašnica regions a separate cluster founded by Slavic and Vlachs or Morlachs migrants from the Velebit hinterland who arrived in the 15th century. On the example of population of the island of Mljet can be perceived demographic and historical events like the island's use for quarantine station, while along Vis and Lastovo consanguinity practice and inbreeding due to lack of genetic diversity, being suitable for genetic-epidemiological research.

In the 2004 mtDNA analysis, one cluster was formed by populations from islands Hvar, Krk and Brač, and second cluster included Croatian mainland and Croatian coast, while the island of Korčula was distinguished due to exceptionally high frequency of haplogroup H. In the 2009 mtDNA interpopulation PCA analysis of sub-haplogroups, insular populations from Krk, Ugljan, Korčula, Brač, Hvar were clustered together implying to have close maternal lineages, with Vis close to them, but Rab (U4, H6, J1c) and especially Cres (prevalence U2, W, N1a) had separate outlying positions from both the cluster and each other, and confirmed "that genetic drift, especially founder effect, has played significant role in shaping genetic composition of the isolated population of the island of Cres". In 2017 study the greatest outlier due to isolation, endogamy and lowest reported gene diversity index was Susak. In the 2014 mtDNA PCA analysis, the populations from eastern and southern Croatia clustered together with Bosnia and Herzegovina, while western and northern Croatia with Slovenia. As Slovenian population does not form Southeast Europe cluster it is considered a possible input from different migration waves of Slavs in the Middle Ages.

Population	Samples	Source	H	HV	J	T	K	U*	U1	U2	U3	U4	U5	U6	U7	U8	R	N	I	W	X	Other
Croatia	488	Šarac et al. (2014)	45.29	4.07	9.83	5.98	4.30	0	1.23	2.66	1.43	2.66	10.06	0.20	0.41	0.20	0	0.82	2.61	1.84	1.84	4.29
East Croatia	61	Šarac et al. (2014)	49.18	11.48	9.84	3.28	4.92	0	0	0	1.64	1.64	9.84	0	0	0	0	1.64	0	4.92	1.64	0
North Croatia	155	Šarac et al. (2014)	41.77	5.06	14.56	10.76	3.16	0	0.63	1.90	0.63	3.16	11.39	0.63	0	0.63	0	0	1.27	2.53	0.63	0.63
West Croatia	209	Šarac et al. (2014)	46.41	11.48	6.70	2.39	5.74	0	2.39	4.31	1.91	2.39	6.22	0	0.96	0	0	0.96	4.78	0	2.39	0
South Croatia	63	Šarac et al. (2014)	49.21	3.17	7.94	9.52	3.17	0	0	1.59	1.59	3.17	12.70	0	0	0	0	1.59	1.59	1.59	3.17	0
Croatia	200	Barbarić et al. (2020)	25.5	11.5	7.5	10	7.5	0	2	4	2.5	2.5	10	0	1	0	7.5	2	3	1	2	0.5

== Contemporary autosomal DNA ==
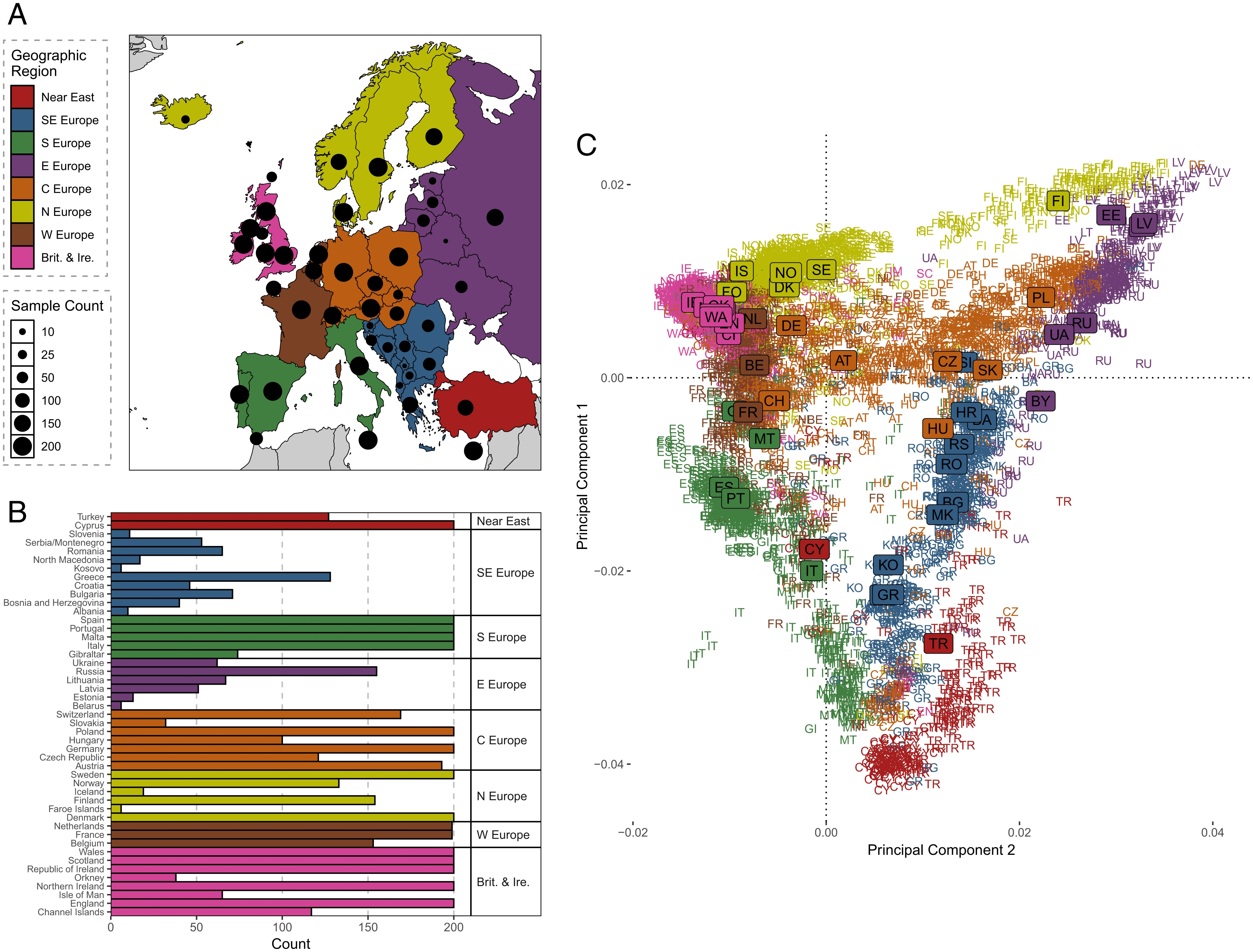
The median plot of Croats from Croatia on a PCA including European countries, per Gilbert et al. 2022.

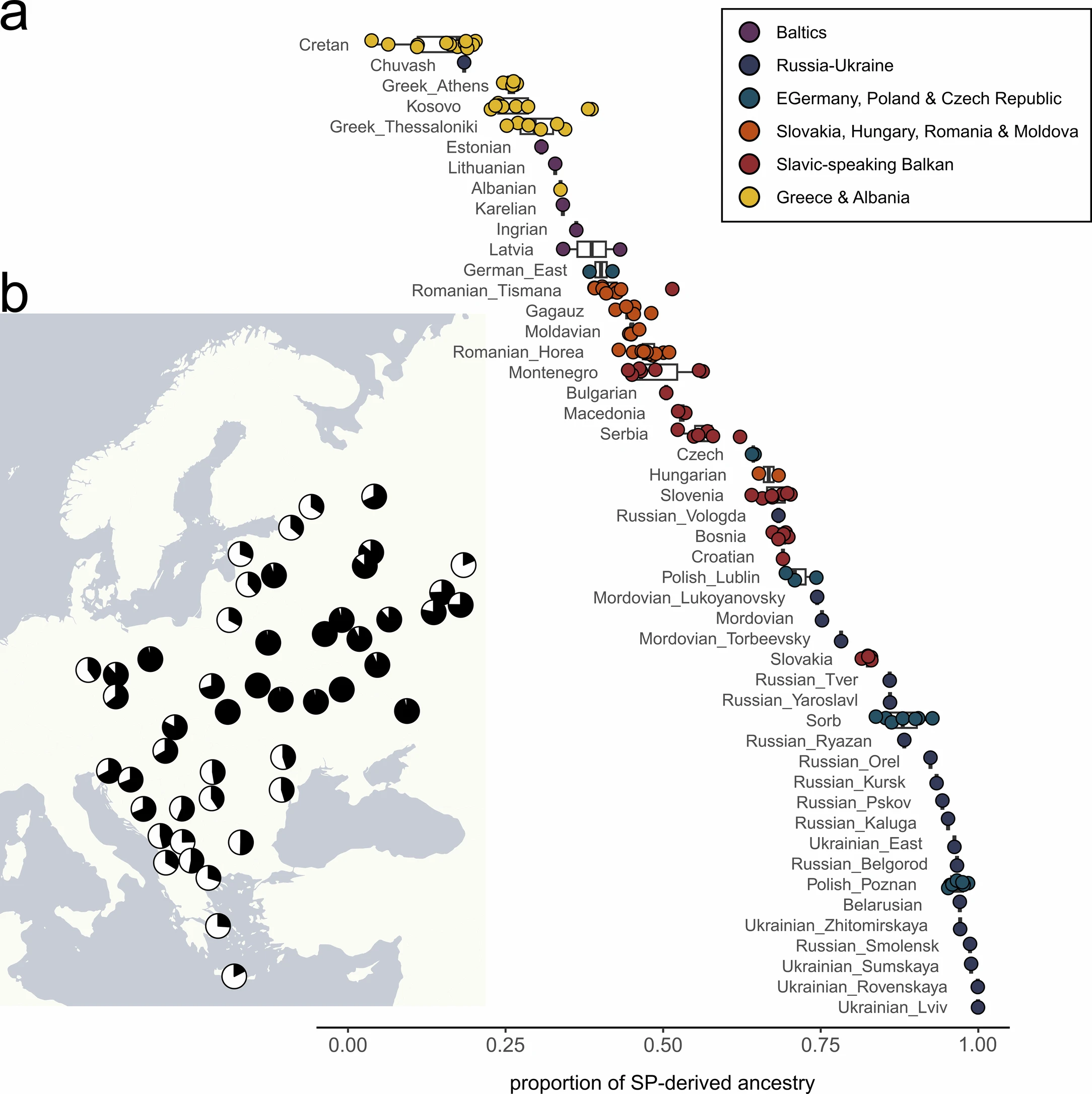
The genetic legacy of the Slavic expansion (black, in Croatia is 69%), per Gretzinger et al. 2025.

According to 2013 autosomal IBD survey "of recent genealogical ancestry over the past 3,000 years at a continental scale", the speakers of Serbo-Croatian language share a very high number of common ancestors dating to the migration period approximately 1,500 years ago with Poland and Romania-Bulgaria cluster among others in Eastern Europe. It is concluded to be caused by the Hunnic and Slavic expansion, which was a "relatively small population that expanded over a large geographic area", particularly "the expansion of the Slavic populations into regions of low population density beginning in the sixth century" and that it is "highly coincident with the modern distribution of Slavic languages". According to Kushniarevich et al., the Hellenthal et al. 2014 IBD analysis also found "multi-directional admixture events among East Europeans (both Slavic and non-Slavic), dated to around 1,000–1,600 YBP" which coincides with "the proposed time-frame for the Slavic expansion". The 2015 IBD analysis found that the South Slavs have lower proximity to Greeks than with East and West Slavs, and that there's an "even patterns of IBD sharing among East-West Slavs–'inter-Slavic' populations (Hungarians, Romanians and Gagauz)–and South Slavs, i.e. across an area of assumed historic movements of people including Slavs". The slight peak of shared IBD segments between South and East-West Slavs suggests a shared "Slavonic-time ancestry". The 2014 IBD analysis comparison of Western Balkan and Middle Eastern populations also found negligible gene flow between 16th and 19th century during the Islamization of the Balkans. In the 2022 analysis Croatian, Bosnian and Herzegovinian, and Serbian individuals made "Northwestern Balkans" cluster which had less Southern European ("Greek") ancestry than "Northeastern Balkans" cluster formed by Romanian and Bulgarian individuals. The "NW Balkans" cluster also had "slightly longer within-cluster IBD segments than NE Balkans, which is matched with a consistently lower Ne and elevated ROH—suggestive of a smaller population than the northeast of the Balkans".

According to a 2014 autosomal analysis of Western Balkan, the Croatian population shows genetic uniformity with other South Slavic populations. The Croatians and Bosnians were more close to East European populations and largely overlapped with Hungarians from Central Europe. In the 2015 analysis, they formed a western South Slavic cluster with the Bosnians and Slovenians in comparison to eastern cluster formed by Macedonians and Bulgarians with Serbians in the middle. The western cluster has an inclination toward Hungarians, Czechs, and Slovaks, while the eastern cluster toward Romanians and some extent Greeks. The modeled ancestral genetic component of Balto-Slavs among South Slavs was between 55 and 70%. In the 2018 analysis of Slovenian population, the Croatian population again clustered with Slovenians, Hungarians and was close to Czech. The population of Croatia mostly shares a common ancestry with Eastern, Western, and Southern Europeans, and has almost no relation to isolated populations like the Sardinians and the Basques.

According to 2023 archaeogenetic study autosomal qpAdm modelling, the modern-day Croats are 66.5% of Central-Eastern European early medieval Slavic ancestry, 31.2% of Croatia-Serbia local Roman ancestry and 2.4% Roman Imperial Era West Anatolian ancestry. According to the latest and most comprehensive 2025 archaeogenetic study, the qpAdm modelling reveals that 82±1% of the local pre-Slavic gene pool in medieval Croatia was replaced by the Slavic ancestry, and modern Croats can be modelled as 69% Slavic and 31% of pre-Slavic local ancestry.

According to 2005 and 2006 autosomal STR marker studies the most isolated islands were Korčula, and Susak. A 2016 whole exome sequencing study of 176 individuals from the island of Vis confirmed the isolate status of the island's population, and revealed the "pattern of loss-of-function mutations, which resembles the trails of adaptive evolution". The 2022 autosomal STR marker study on 2877 unrelated individuals from mainland (cities Zagreb, Pazin, Delnice, Zabok and Donji Miholjac, and region of Baranja) and insular (Krk, Cres, three North Dalmatian islands Ugljan-Pašman-Dugi Otok, Brač, Hvar, Korčula and Vis) subpopulations found higher genetic differentiation (0.005) compared to Southeastern Europe (0.002) indicating "a certain degree of genetic isolation, most likely due to the influence of endogamy within rural island populations". Croatian population is closest to Bosnia and Herzegovina, Hungary and Slovenia. There are visible four main clusters within sampled Croats, first including Mainland-Brač and Krk-North Dalmatian islands, second Hvar-Korčula, third Cres, and fourth Vis, the latter two having highest distances from the others.

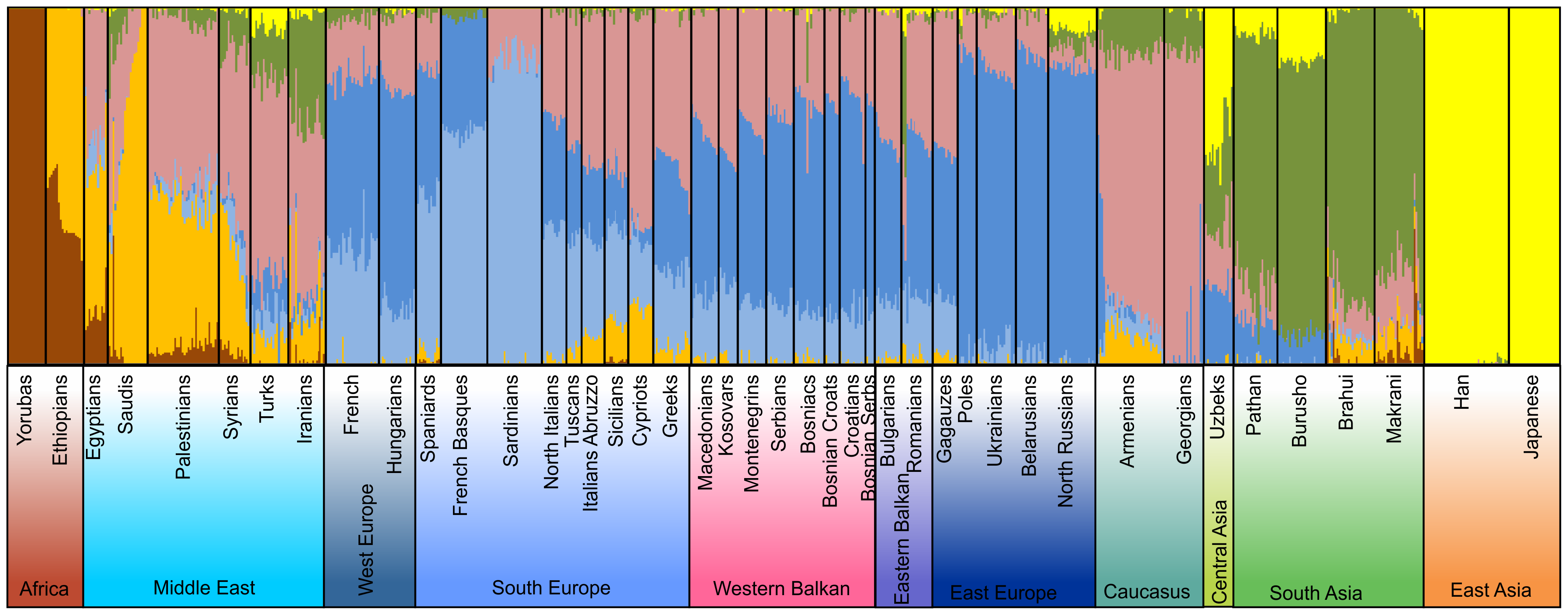
Admixture analysis of autosomal SNPs in a global context on the resolution level of 7 assumed ancestral populations per Kovačević et al. (2014)

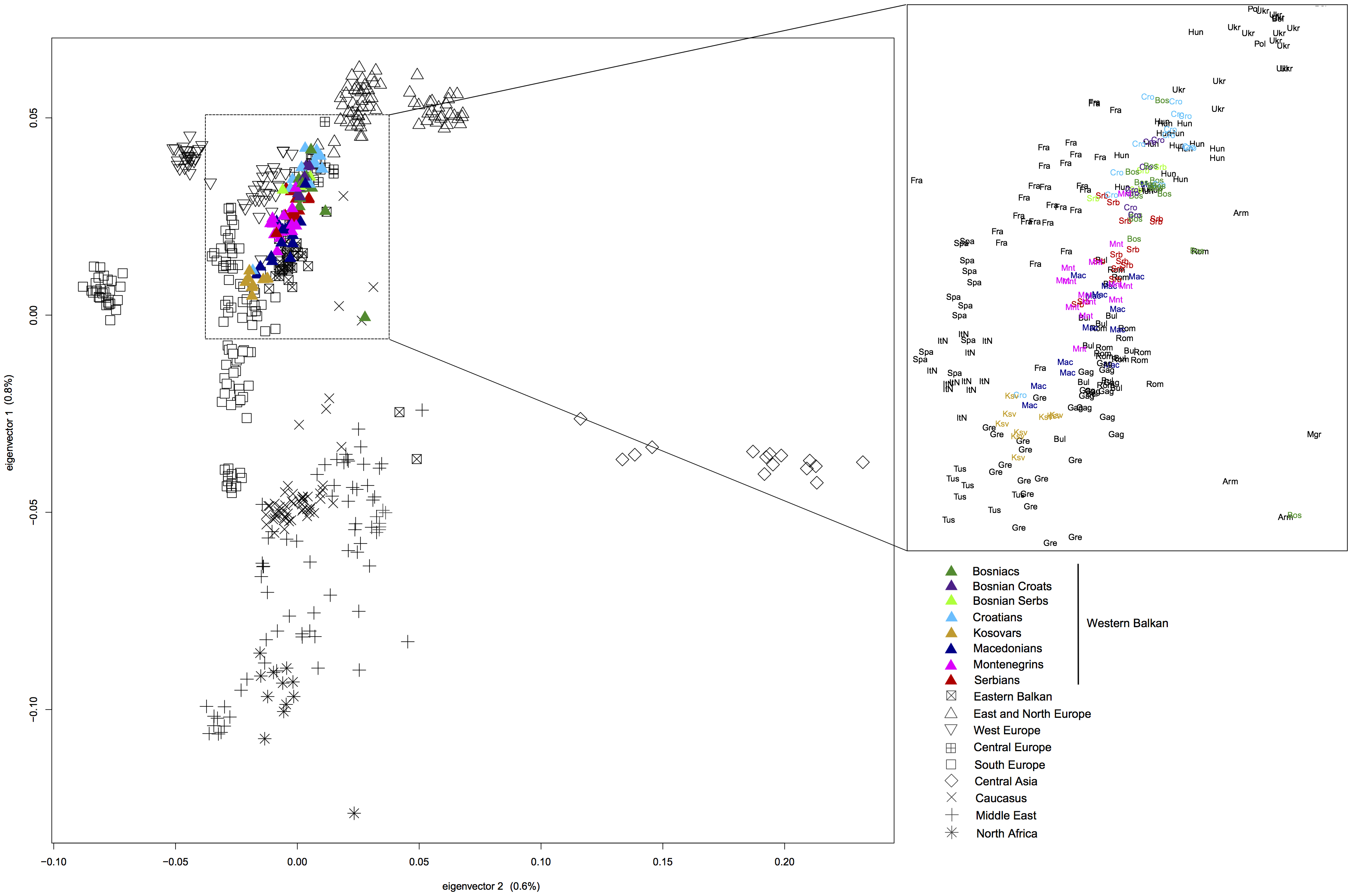
Principal component (PC) analysis of the variation of autosomal SNPs in Western Balkan populations in Eurasian context per Kovačević et al. (2014)

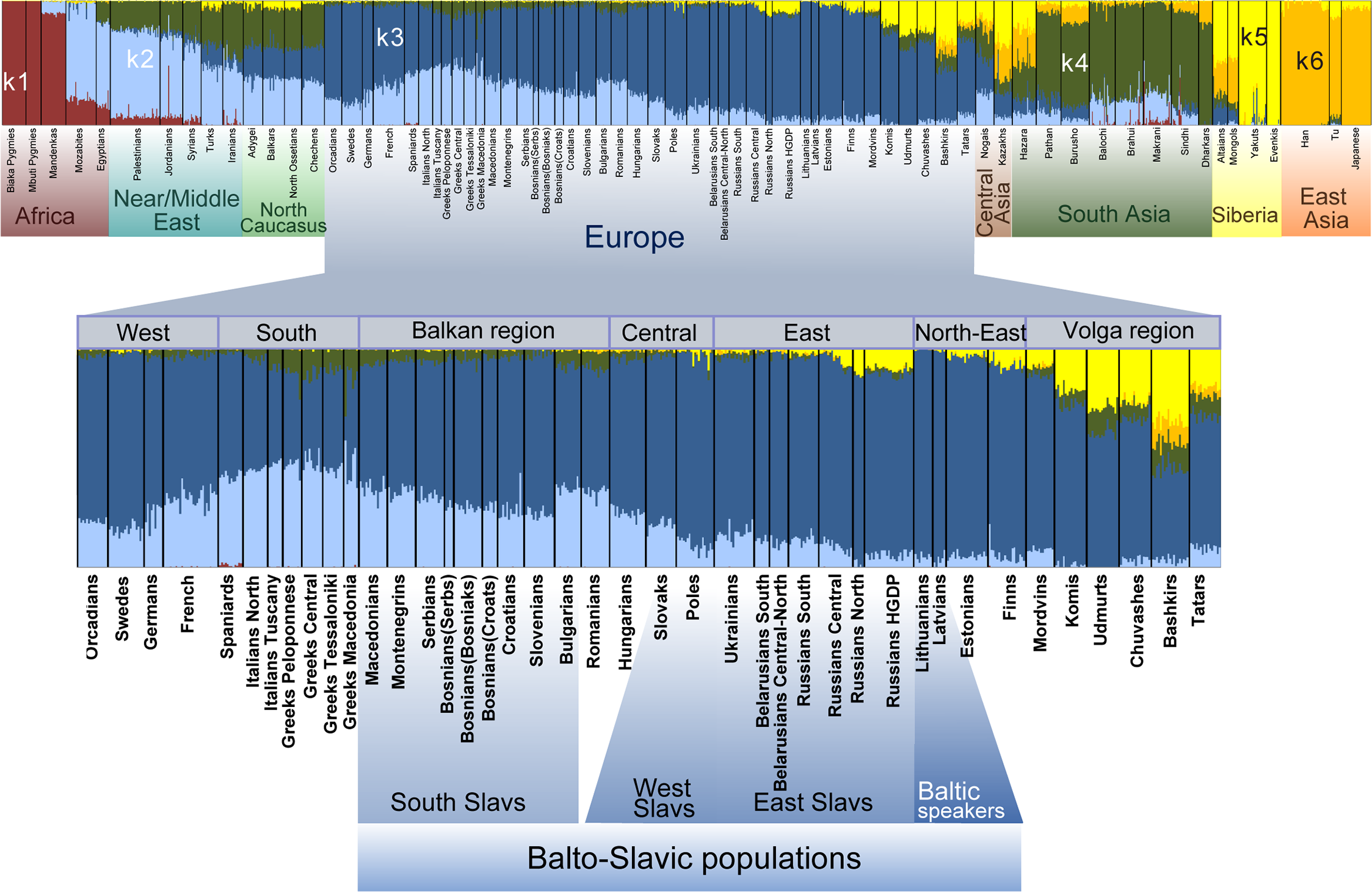
Admixture analysis on the resolution level of 6 assumed ancestral populations per Kushniarevich et al. (2015)

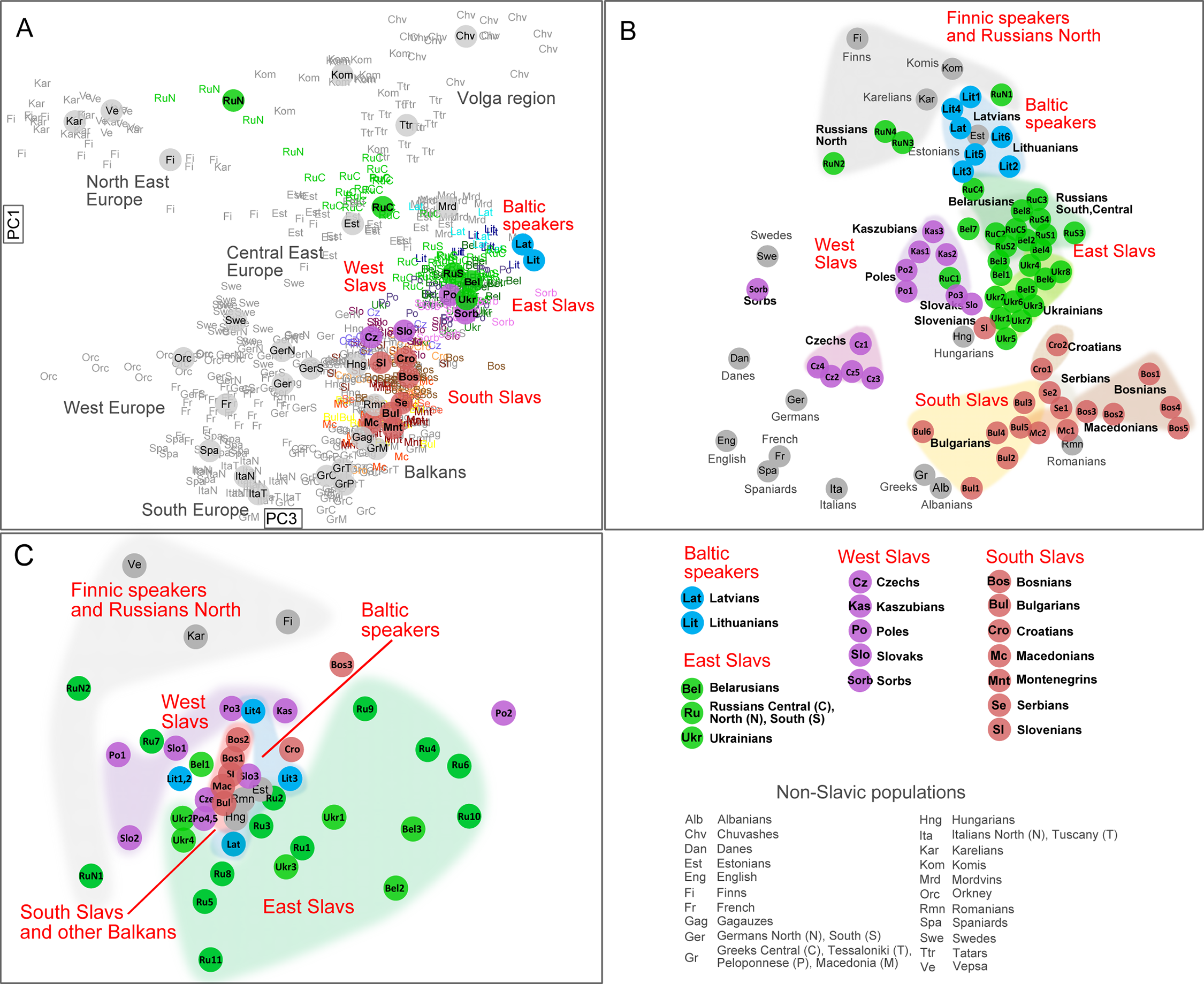
Genetic structure within European context according to three genetic systems atDNA (A), YDNA (B) and mtDNA (C) per Kushniarevich et al. (2015)

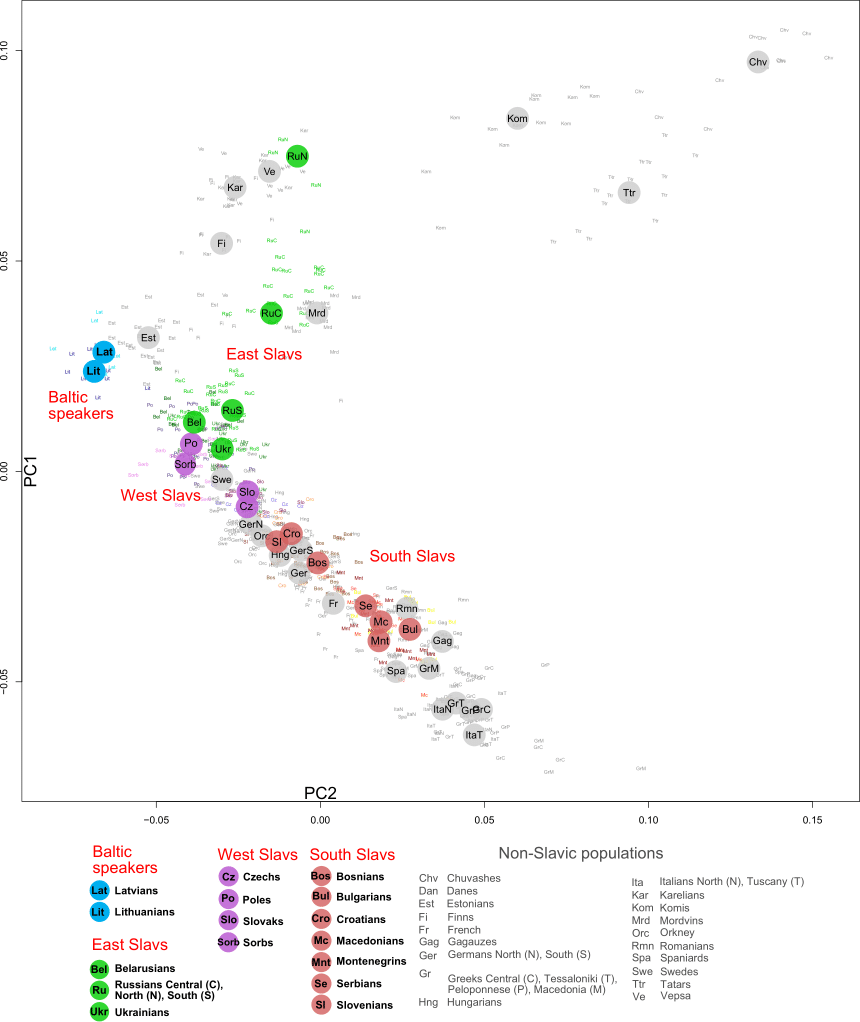
PC1vsPC2 plot based on whole genome SNP data per Kushniarevich et al. (2015)

== See also ==
- White Croats
- Origin hypotheses of the Croats
- Genetic studies on Bosniaks
- Genetic studies on Bulgarians
- Genetic studies on Serbs
- Ancient DNA
- Genetic history of Europe
- Y-DNA haplogroups by ethnic group
- Y-DNA haplogroups in populations of Europe
