= Haplogroup I-M438 =

Human Y-chromosome DNA haplogroup

- Possible time of origin: 28–33,000 years ago
- Possible place of origin: South-Eastern/Eastern Europe
- Ancestor: I-M170
- Descendants: I-L460, I-L1251
- Defining mutations: M438/P215/S31
- Highest frequencies: I2a1a: Sardinia I2a1b: Bosnia and Herzegovina, I2a2: Britain, Germany, and Sweden

Haplogroup I-M438, also known as I2 (ISOGG 2019), is a human DNA Y-chromosome haplogroup, a subclade of haplogroup I-M170. Haplogroup I-M438 originated some time around 26,000–31,000 BCE. It originated in Europe and developed into several main subgroups: I2-M438*, I2a-L460, I2b-L415 and I2c-L596. The haplogroup can be found all over Europe and reaches its maximum frequency in the Dinaric Alps (Balkans) via founder effect, related to the migrations of the Early Slavs to the Balkan peninsula.

The oldest example so far found is that of Hohle Fels (49) from Germany, being at least 14,200 years old.

== Origin and prehistoric presence ==
Haplogroup I2a was the most frequent Y-DNA among Mesolithic Western European hunter-gatherers (WHG) belonging to Villabruna Cluster. A 2015 study found haplogroup I2a in 13,500 year old remains from the Azilian culture (from Grotte du Bichon, modern Switzerland). Subclades of I2a1 (I-P37.2), namely I-M423 and I-M26, have been found in remains of WHGs dating from 10,000 to 8,000 years before present.

In a 2015 study published in Nature, the remains of six individuals from Motala ascribed to the Kongemose culture were successfully analyzed. With regards to Y-DNA, two individuals were ascribed to haplogroup I2a1b, one individual was ascribed to haplogroup I2a1, and one individual was ascribed to haplogroup I2c.

== Subclades ==
The vast majority of individuals belonging to I2 also belong to I-L460, formerly known as I2a. The following subclades are all nested within I-L460.

=== I-P37.2 ===
The I-P37.2+ (also known as I2a1a) (ISOGG 2019). The subclade divergence for I-P37.2 occurred 10.7±4.8 kya. The age of YSTR variation for the P37.2 subclade is 8.0±4.0 kya. It is the predominant version of I2 in Eastern Europe. The I2a is further made up by subgroups I-M26, I-M423, I-L1286, I-L880.

==== I-L158 ====
Haplogroup I-M26 (or M26) I2a1a1a (ISOGG 2019).

Haplogroup I-L158 (L158, L159.1/S169.1, M26) accounts for approximately 40% of all patrilines among Sardinians. It is also found at low to moderate frequency among populations of the Pyrenees (9.5% in Bortzerriak, Navarra; 9.7% in Chazetania, Aragon; 8% in Val d'Aran, Catalunya; 2.9% in Alt Urgell, Catalunya; and 8.1% in Baixa Cerdanya, Catalunya) and Iberia, and it has been found in 1.6% of a sample of Albanians living in the Republic of North Macedonia and 1.2% (3/257) of a sample of Czechs. The age of YSTR variation for the M26 subclade has been calculated as 8.0±4.0 kya.

==== I-L178 ====
I-L178 is very rare, but has been found in two persons from Germany and one from Poland. The age of YSTR variation for the M423 subclade is 8.8±3.6 kya.

==== I2a-L621 ====
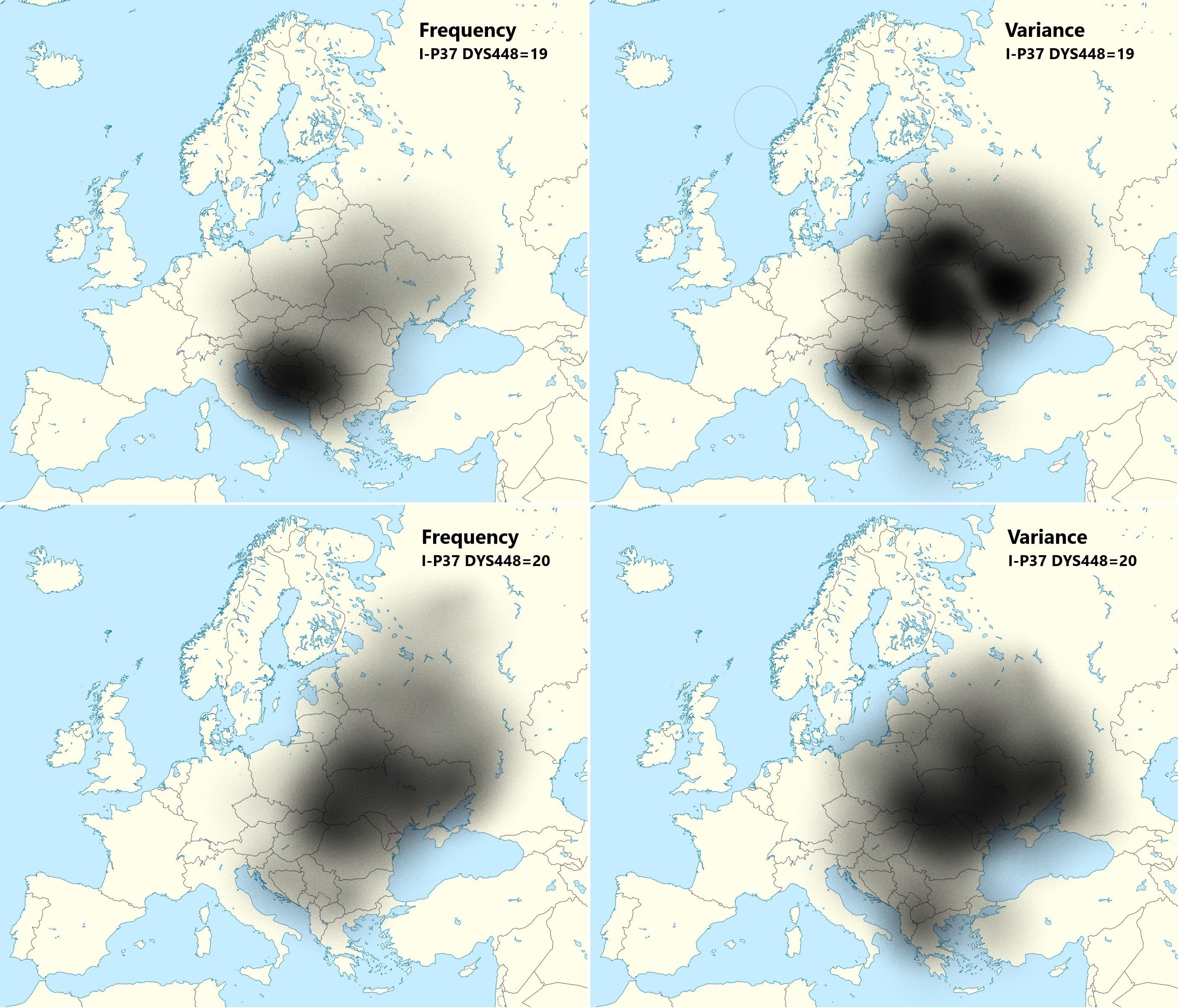
The approximate frequency and variance distribution of haplogroup I-P37 clusters, ancestral "Dnieper-Carpathian" (DYS448=20) and derived "Balkan" (DYS448=19: represented by a single SNP I-PH908), in Eastern Europe per O.M. Utevska (2017).

I2a1a2b-L621 is typical of the Slavic populations, being highest in Southeastern European regions of Bosnia-Herzegovina and South Croatia (>45%), in Croats (37.7-69.8%), Bosniaks (43.53-52.17%), and Serbs (36.6-42%)—often called "Dinaric". It has the highest variance and concentration in Eastern Europe (i.e., Ukraine, Southeastern Poland, Belarus). According to YFull YTree it formed 11,400 YBP and had TMRCA 6,500 YBP, while its main subclades lineage is I-CTS10936 (6,500-5,600 YBP) > I-S19848 (5,600 YBP) > I-CTS4002 (5,600-5,100 YBP) > I-CTS10228 (5,100-3,400 YBP) > I-Y3120 (3,400-2,100 YBP) > I-Y18331 (2,100 YBP) / I-Z17855 (2,100-1650 YBP) / I-Y4460 (2,100 YBP) / I-S17250 (2,100-1,850 YBP) > I-PH908 (1,850-1,700 YBP).

Older research considered that the high frequency of this subclade in the South Slavic-speaking populations to be the result of "pre-Slavic" paleolithic settlement in the region. Peričić et al. (2005) for instance placed its expansion to have occurred "not earlier than the YD to Holocene transition and not later than the early Neolithic". However, the prehistoric autochthonous origin of the haplogroup I2 in the Balkans is now considered as outdated, (Note: The SNP I-P37 itself formed approximately 21,000 YBP and had TMRCA 18,400 YBP according to YFull YTree, being too old and widespread as an SNP for argumentation of ancient autochthony or medieval migration as well the old research used outdated nomenclature. According to "I-P37 (I2a)" project at Family Tree DNA, the divergence at STR marker DYS448 20 > 19 is reported since 2007, while the SNP which defines the STR Dinaric-South cluster, I-PH908, is reported since 2014. The SNP I-PH908 at ISOGG phylogenetic tree is named as I2a1a2b1a1a1c, while formed and had TMRCA approximately 1,800 YBP according to YFull.) as already Battaglia et al. (2009) observed highest variance of the haplogroup in Ukraine, and Zupan et al. (2013) noted that it suggests it arrived with Slavic migration from the homeland which was in present-day Ukraine. O.M. Utevska (2017), in her PhD thesis, despite being a part of research team who came to a different conclusion in 2015, proposed that the haplogroup STR haplotypes have the highest diversity in Ukraine, with ancestral STR marker result "DYS448=20" comprising "Dnieper-Carpathian" cluster, while younger derived result "DYS448=19" comprising the "Balkan cluster" which is predominant among the South Slavs. According to her, this "Balkan cluster" also has the highest variance in Ukraine, which indicates that the very high frequency in the Western Balkan is probably because of a founder effect. Utevska calculated that the STR cluster divergence and its secondary expansion from the middle reaches of the Dnieper river or from Eastern Carpathians towards the Balkan peninsula happened approximately 2,860 ± 730 years ago, relating it to the times before Slavs, but much after the decline of the Cucuteni–Trypillia culture. However, STR-based calculations give overestimated dates, and more specifically, the "Balkan cluster" is represented by a single SNP, I-PH908, known as I2a1a2b1a1a1c in ISOGG phylogenetic tree (2019), and according to YFull YTree it formed and had TMRCA approximately 1,850-1,700 YBP (2nd-3rd century AD).

It is considered that I-L621 could have been present in the Cucuteni–Trypillia culture, but until now was mainly found G2a and non-I2-L621 clades, and another clade I2a1a1-CTS595 was present in the Baden culture of the Chalcolithic Carpathian Basin. Although it is dominant among the modern Slavic peoples on the territory of the former Balkan provinces of the Roman Empire, until now it was not found among the samples from the Roman period and is almost absent in contemporary population of Italy. According to Pamjav et al. (2019) and Fóthi et al. (2020), the distribution of ancestral subclades like of I-CTS10228 among contemporary carriers indicates a rapid expansion from Southeastern Poland, is mainly related to the Slavs and their medieval migration, and the "largest demographic explosion occurred in the Balkans". According to a 2023 archaeogenetic study, I2a-L621 is absent in the antiquity and appears only since the Early Middle Ages "always associated with Eastern European related ancestry in the autosomal genome, which supports that these lineages were introduced in the Balkans by Eastern European migrants during the Early Medieval period."

Some of the earliest archeogenetic samples until now is Sungir 6 (~900 YBP) near Vladimir, Russia which belonged to the I-S17250 > I-Y5596 > I-Z16971 > I-Y5595 > I-A16681 subclade, as well I-CTS10228 and I-Y3120 subclades found in two Vikings from Sweden (VK53) and Ukraine (VK542) with predominantly Slavic ancestry of which the second belongs to Gleb Svyatoslavich (11th century). It was also found in the skeletal remains of Hungarian conquerors of the Carpathian Basin from the 9th century, part of Western Eurasian-Slavic component of the Hungarians.

=== I-M223 ===
Haplogroup I-M223 aka I2a1b1 (ISOGG 2019), formerly I2a2a (ISOGG 2014). The age of YSTR variation for the I-M223 subclade has been variously estimated as 13.2±2.7 kya, 12.3±3.1 kya., 14.6 kya and 14.6±3.8 kya (Rootsi 2004). I-M223 has a peak in Germany and another in the northeast of Sweden, but also appears in Romania/Moldova, Russia, Greece, Italy and around the Black Sea. Haplogroup I-M223 has been found in over 4% of the population only in Germany, the Netherlands, Belgium, Denmark, Scotland, and England – also the southern tips of Sweden and Norway in Northwest Europe; the provinces of Normandy, Maine, Anjou, and Perche in northwestern France; the province of Provence in southeastern France; the regions of Tuscany, Umbria, and Latium in Italy; Moldavia and the area around Russia's Ryazan Oblast and Mordovia in Eastern Europe. Of historical note, both haplogroups I-M253 and I-M223 appear at a low frequency in the historical regions of Bithynia and Galatia in Turkey. Haplogroup I-M223 also occurs among approximately 1% of Sardinians.

==== I-M284 ====
Haplogroup I2a1b1a1a (ISOGG 2019) or I-M284, has been found almost exclusively amongst the populations of the United Kingdom and Ireland suggesting that it may have arisen amongst the Ancient Britons, with a most recent common ancestor (MRCA) who lived about 3,100 years BP. The presence of this subclade "provides some tentative evidence of ancient flow with eastern areas that could support the idea that the [late Celtic] La Tene culture was accompanied by some migration."

Where it is found in those of predominately Irish descent, with Gaelic surnames, it may suggest an ancestor who arrived in Ireland during prehistory, from Celtic Britain. For example, I-M284 includes many males with the surnames McGuinness and McCartan, who have a single, historically recorded male ancestor in the 6th century; thus it is unlikely to be the result of subsequent migration from Britain to Ireland. Some subclades of I-M284 that are atypical of Ireland are relatively common in continental Europe, which also supports a point of origin east of Ireland.

==== I-CTS10057 ====
This subclade is commonly referred to as "Continentals". The most recent common ancestor is estimated to have been born around 10,700 years ago. It is in turn divided into haplogroups I-L701 (Continental clade 3) and I-Z161 (Continental clades 1 and 2). Continental 3 has a wide distribution. Found in Central Europe from Germany, Austria to Poland, Romania and Ukraine, but also in lower frequencies in Greece, Italy, France, Spain, England, Ireland, and Armenia. It may have been disseminated in part by the Goths. It is nearly absent from Scandinavia and Scotland. The age of I-Z161 is estimated to be around 7,000 years old. It is mainly found in North Europe, especially in Denmark, Germany, the Netherlands, and England. It can also be found in Northwest Sicily.

== Structure ==
Up-to-date phylogenetic trees listing subclades of I2 can be found at YFull.com and FamilyTreeDNA.

- Haplogroup I
  - I1
    - I1a (I-DF29)
    - I-Z17954
  - I2
    - I2b (I-L416)
    - - I2a (I-L460)
      - I2c (I-L596)

== See also ==
- Human Y-chromosome DNA haplogroups
- Haplogroup I (Y-DNA)
- Haplogroup I1 (Y-DNA)
