= Divičani =

Divičani Дивичани
- Village
- Location within Bosnia and Herzegovina
- Coordinates: 44°22′N 17°20′E
- Country: Bosnia and Herzegovina
- Entity: Federation of Bosnia and Herzegovina
- Canton: Central Bosnia
- Municipality: Jajce

Area
  - Total: 1.00 sq mi (2.60 km^{2})

Population (2013)
  - Total: 1,065
  - Density: 1,060/sq mi (410/km^{2})
- Time zone: UTC+1 (CET)
  - Summer (DST): UTC+2 (CEST)

Divičani (Serbian Cyrillic: Дивичани) is a village in the municipality of Jajce, Bosnia and Herzegovina.

== Demographics ==
According to the 2013 census, its population was 1,065.

Ethnicity in 2013
Ethnicity	Number	Percentage
Bosniaks	729	68.5%
Croats	170	16.0%
other/undeclared	166	15.6%
Total	1,065	100%
