= Oleg Balanovsky =

Russian researcher (1977–2021)

- Oleg Pavlovich Balanovsky
- Born: 3 July 1977; Moscow, Soviet Union
- Died: 5 July 2021 (44 years); Neya, Kostroma Oblast, Russia
- Education: MSU Faculty of Biology
- Known for: Genetic studies on Russians; Genetic history of Europe
- Scientific career
- Fields: Genetics; Anthropology
- Workplaces: Russian Academy of Sciences; Moscow State University
- Thesis: Variability of the gene pool in space and time - synthesis of data on the genogeography of mitochondrial DNA and Y chromosom (2012)
- Doctoral advisor: Svetlana Limborskaya

Oleg Balanovsky (3 July 1977 – 5 July 2021) was a Russian geneticist. He held the title of Doctor of Biological Sciences and Professor of the RAS, headed the Laboratory of Genomic Geography at the Russian Academy of Sciences. His two most popular monographs are: "Russian Gene Pool on Russian Plain" (2007) and "The gene pool of Europe" (2015).

== Life and education ==
Born in 1977 in Moscow, the son of Elena Balanovskaya, a popular geneticist. In 1994-1998 he studied at MSU. His thesis was awarded the medal "best student work". In 2000, he became a graduate student at the Russian Academy of Sciences. Since 2011, he became the head of the scientific group and reached the position of "leading researcher". In 2012 he defended his dissertation for a doctorate degree. Before his birthday (July 3), he decided to take a vacation and go to a cottage near Kostroma, and on July 5, went swimming with the children on the Neya River, however, the children began to drown and he rushed to rescue, eventually did it, but he could not get out himself and drowned.

== Scientific and social activities ==
He is the author of more than 324 publications in Russian and international journals. He was also quoted in Forbes. He is the author of two monographs on the gene pool of Europe, mostly Russia.

h-index is 24.

== Bibliography ==
- Balanovsky, Oleg (2015). Генофонд Европы [The Gene Pool of Europe] (PDF) (in Russian). Moscow: Товарищество научных изданий КМК. ISBN 978-5-9907157-0-7.
- Balanovsky, Oleg; Balanovskaya, Elena (2007). Генофонд русских на русской равнине [The Gene Pool of Russians on Russian plain] (in Russian). Moscow: Луч. ISBN 978-5-87140-267-2.
