= Parfenyevo =

Parfenyevo (Russian: Парфеньево) is the name of several rural localities in Russia:

- Parfenyevo, Ivanovo Oblast, a village in Ivanovsky District of Ivanovo Oblast
- Parfenyevo, Ostrovsky District, Kostroma Oblast, a village in Klevantsovskoye Settlement of Ostrovsky District of Kostroma Oblast
- Parfenyevo, Parfenyevsky District, Kostroma Oblast, a selo in Parfenyevskoye Settlement of Parfenyevsky District of Kostroma Oblast
- Parfenyevo, Susaninsky District, Kostroma Oblast, a village in Sokirinskoye Settlement of Susaninsky District of Kostroma Oblast
- Parfenyevo, Molokovsky District, Tver Oblast, a village in Molokovsky District, Tver Oblast
- Parfenyevo (Starosandovskoye Rural Settlement), Sandovsky District, Tver Oblast, a village in Sandovsky District, Tver Oblast; municipally, a part of Starosandovskoye Rural Settlement of that district
- Parfenyevo (Bolshemalinskoye Rural Settlement), Sandovsky District, Tver Oblast, a village in Sandovsky District, Tver Oblast; municipally, a part of Bolshemalinskoye Rural Settlement of that district
- Parfenyevo, Lyubimsky District, Yaroslavl Oblast, a village in Voskresensky Rural Okrug of Lyubimsky District of Yaroslavl Oblast
- Parfenyevo, Nekouzsky District, Yaroslavl Oblast, a selo in Rozhalovsky Rural Okrug of Nekouzsky District of Yaroslavl Oblast
- Parfenyevo, Pervomaysky District, Yaroslavl Oblast, a village in Uritsky Rural Okrug of Pervomaysky District of Yaroslavl Oblast
