= Genetic history of Europe =

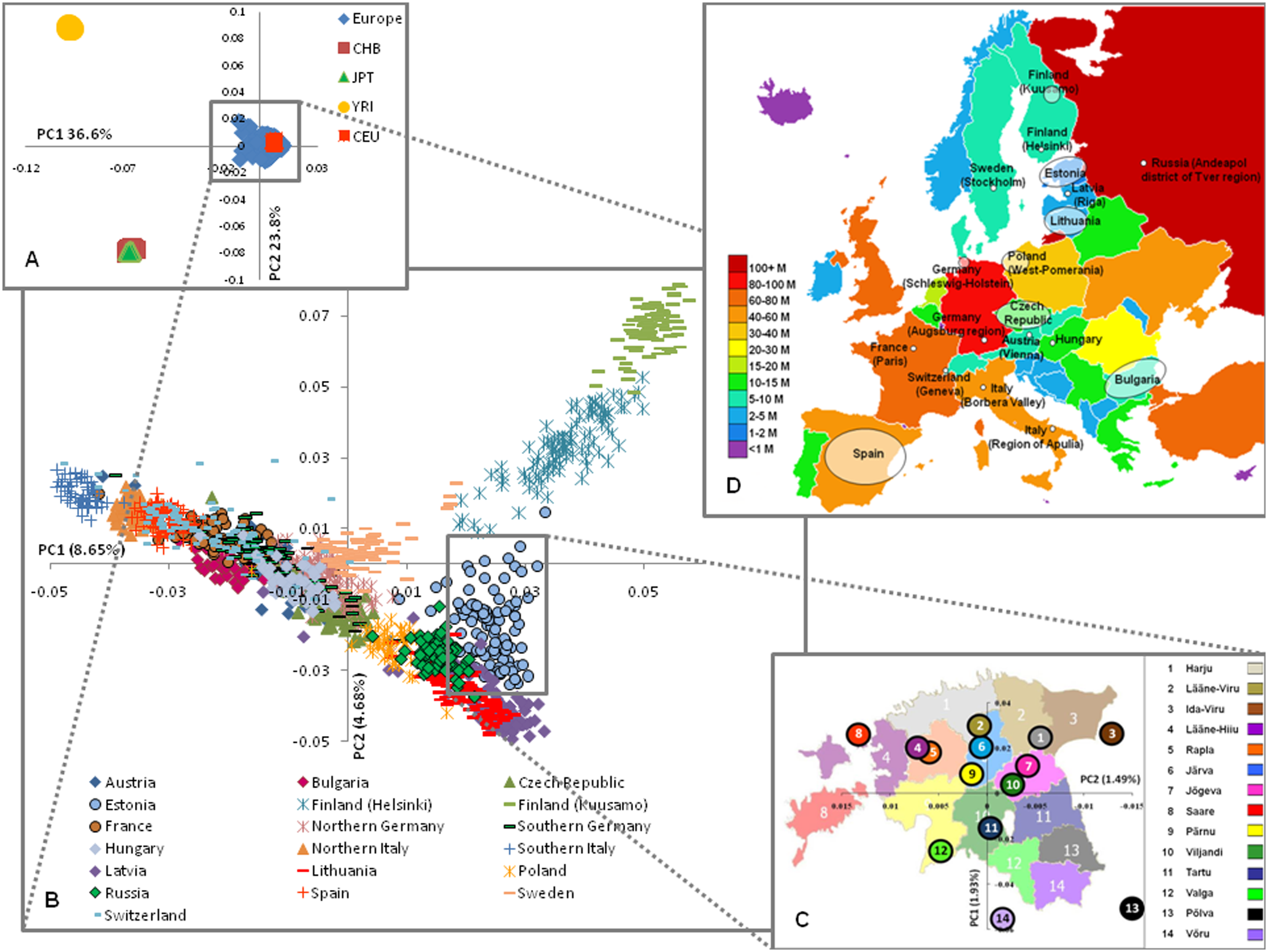
The European genetic structure today (based on 273,464 SNPs). Three levels of structure as revealed by PC analysis are shown: A) inter-continental; B) intra-continental; and C) inside a single country (Estonia), where median values of the PC1&2 are shown. D) European map illustrating the origin of sample and population size. CEU – Utah residents with ancestry from Northern and Western Europe, CHB – Han Chinese from Beijing, JPT – Japanese from Tokyo, and YRI – Yoruba from Ibadan, Nigeria.

The genetic history of Europe includes information around the formation, ethnogenesis, and other DNA-specific information about populations indigenous, or living in Europe.

European early modern human (EEMH) lineages between 40 and 26 ka (Aurignacian) were still part of a large Western Eurasian "meta-population", related to Central and Western Asian populations. Divergence into genetically distinct sub-populations within Western Eurasia is a result of increased selection pressure and founder effects during the Last Glacial Maximum (LGM, Gravettian).

By the end of the LGM, after 20 ka, A Western European lineage, dubbed west European hunter-gatherer (WHG) emerged from the Solutrean refugium during the European Mesolithic. These Mesolithic hunter-gatherer cultures are subsequently replaced in the Neolithic Revolution as a result of the arrival of Early European Farmer (EEF) lineages derived from mesolithic populations of surrounding West Asia (Anatolia). In the European Bronze Age, there were again substantial population replacements in parts of Europe by the intrusion of Western Steppe Herder (WSH) lineages from the Pontic–Caspian steppes, arising from admixture between Eastern Hunter Gatherers (EHG) and peoples related to Near Easterners. These Bronze Age population replacements are associated with the Bell Beaker and Corded Ware cultures archaeologically and with a second wave of Indo-European expansion linguistically.

As a result of the population movements during the Mesolithic to Bronze Age, modern European populations are distinguished by differences in WHG, EEF and Ancient North Eurasian (ANE) ancestry. Admixture rates varied geographically; in the late Neolithic, WHG ancestry in farmers in Hungary was at around 10%, in Germany around 25% and in Iberia as high as 50%. The contribution of EEF is more significant in Mediterranean Europe, and declines towards northern and northeastern Europe, where WHG ancestry is stronger; the Sardinians are considered to be the closest European group to the population of the EEF.

Ethnogenesis of the modern ethnic groups of Europe in the historical period is associated with numerous admixture events, primarily those associated with the Migration period and the decline of the Roman Empire, associated with the Germanic, Norse, and Slavic expansions

Research into the genetic history of Europe became possible in the second half of the 20th century, but did not yield results with high resolution before the 1990s. In the 1990s, preliminary results became possible, but they remained mostly limited to studies of mitochondrial and Y-chromosomal lineages. Autosomal DNA became more easily accessible in the 2000s, and since the mid-2010s, results of previously unattainable resolution, many of them based on full-genome analysis of ancient DNA, have been published at an accelerated pace.

== Prehistory ==
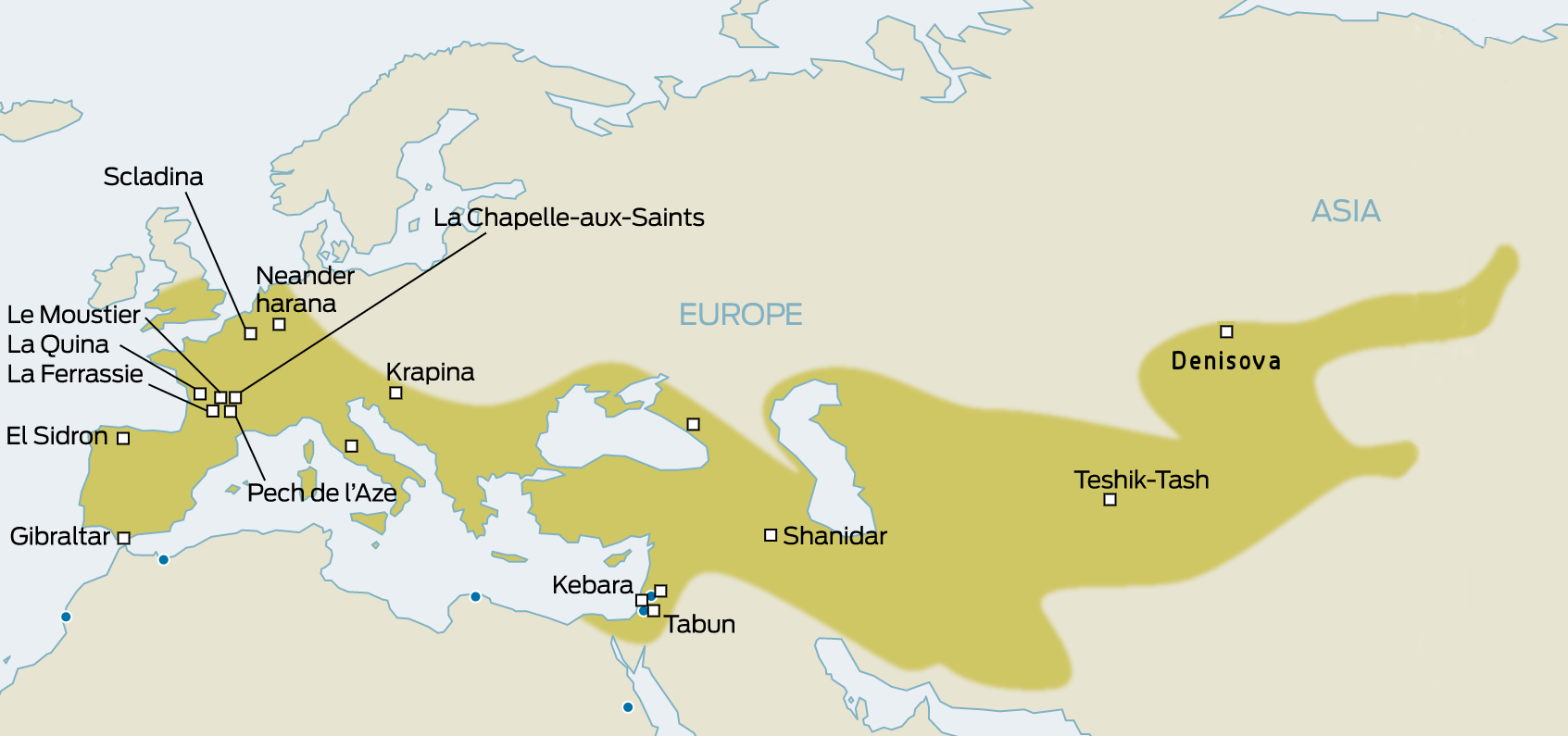
Distribution of the Neanderthals, and main sites

Due to natural selection, the percentage of Neanderthal DNA in ancient Europeans gradually decreased over time. From 45,000 BP to 7,000 BP, the percentage dropped from around 3–6% to 2%. The removal of Neanderthal-derived alleles occurred more frequently around genes than other parts of the genome.

=== Paleolithic ===
Neanderthals inhabited much of Europe and western Asia from as far back as 130,000 years ago. They existed in Europe as late as 30,000 years ago. They were eventually replaced by anatomically modern humans (AMH; sometimes known as Cro-Magnons), who began to appear in Europe circa 40,000 years ago. Given that the two hominid species likely coexisted in Europe, anthropologists have long wondered whether the two interacted. The question was resolved only in 2010, when it was established that Eurasian populations exhibit Neanderthal admixture, estimated at 1.5–2.1% on average. The question now became whether this admixture had taken place in Europe, or rather in the Levant, prior to AMH migration into Europe.

There has also been speculation about the inheritance of specific genes from Neanderthals. For example, one MAPT locus 17q21.3 which is split into deep genetic lineages H1 and H2. Since the H2 lineage seems restricted to European populations, several authors had argued for inheritance from Neanderthals beginning in 2005. However the preliminary results from the sequencing of the full Neanderthal Genome at that time (2009), failed to uncover evidence of interbreeding between Neanderthals and modern humans. By 2010, findings by Svante Pääbo (Max Planck Institute for Evolutionary Anthropology at Leipzig, Germany), Richard E. Green (University of California, Santa Cruz), and David Reich (Harvard Medical School), comparing the genetic material from the bones of three Neanderthals with that from five modern humans, did show a relationship between Neanderthals and modern people outside Africa.

==== Upper Paleolithic ====
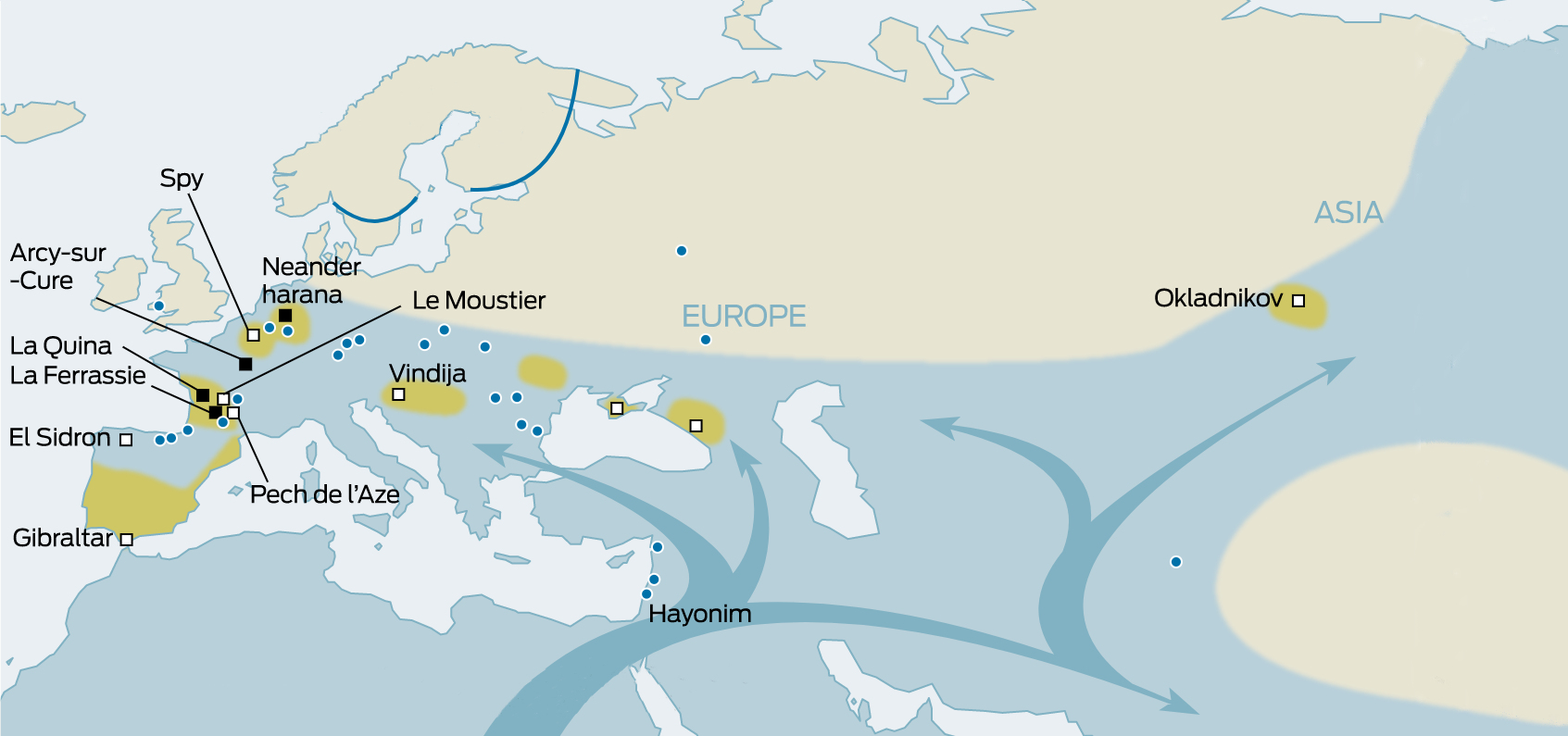
Replacement of Neanderthals by early modern humans

It is thought that modern humans began to inhabit Europe during the Upper Paleolithic about 40,000 years ago. Some evidence shows the spread of the Aurignacian culture.

From a purely patrilineal, Y-chromosome perspective, it appears that Haplogroup C1a2, F and K2a may be those with the oldest presence in Europe. They have been found in some of the oldest human remains sequenced from the Paleolithic era. However, other haplogroups are far more common among modern European males, because of later demographic changes.

Currently the oldest sample of Haplogroup I (M170), which is now relatively common and widespread within Europe, has been found to be Krems WA3 from Lower Austria dating back to about 30–31,000 ybp. At about this time, an Upper Palaeolithic culture also appeared, known as the Gravettian.

Earlier research into Y-DNA had instead focused on haplogroup R1 (M173): the most populous lineage among living European males; R1 was also believed to have emerged ~ 40,000 BP in Central Asia. However, it is now estimated that R1 emerged substantially more recently: a 2008 study dated the most recent common ancestor of haplogroup IJ to 38,500 and haplogroup R1 to 18,000 BP. This suggested that haplogroup IJ colonists formed the first wave and haplogroup R1 arrived much later.

Thus the genetic data suggests that, at least from the perspective of patrilineal ancestry, separate groups of modern humans took two routes into Europe: from the Middle East via the Balkans and another from Central Asia via the Eurasian Steppe, to the north of the Black Sea.

Martin Richards et al. found that 15–40% of extant mtDNA lineages trace back to the Palaeolithic migrations (depending on whether one allows for multiple founder events). MtDNA haplogroup U5, dated to be ~ 40–50 kYa, arrived during the first early upper Palaeolithic colonisation. Individually, it accounts for 5–15% of total mtDNA lineages. Middle U.P. movements are marked by the haplogroups HV, I and U4. HV split into Pre-V (around 26,000 years old) and the larger branch H, both of which spread over Europe, possibly via Gravettian contacts.

Haplogroup H accounts for about half the gene lines in Europe, with many subgroups. The above mtDNA lineages or their precursors, are most likely to have arrived into Europe via the Middle East. This contrasts with Y DNA evidence, whereby some 50%-plus of male lineages are characterised by the R1 superfamily, which is of possible central Asian origin. Ornella Semino postulates that these differences "may be due in part to the apparent more recent molecular age of Y chromosomes relative to other loci, suggesting more rapid replacement of previous Y chromosomes. Gender-based differential migratory demographic behaviors will also influence the observed patterns of mtDNA and Y variation".

==== Last Glacial Maximum ====
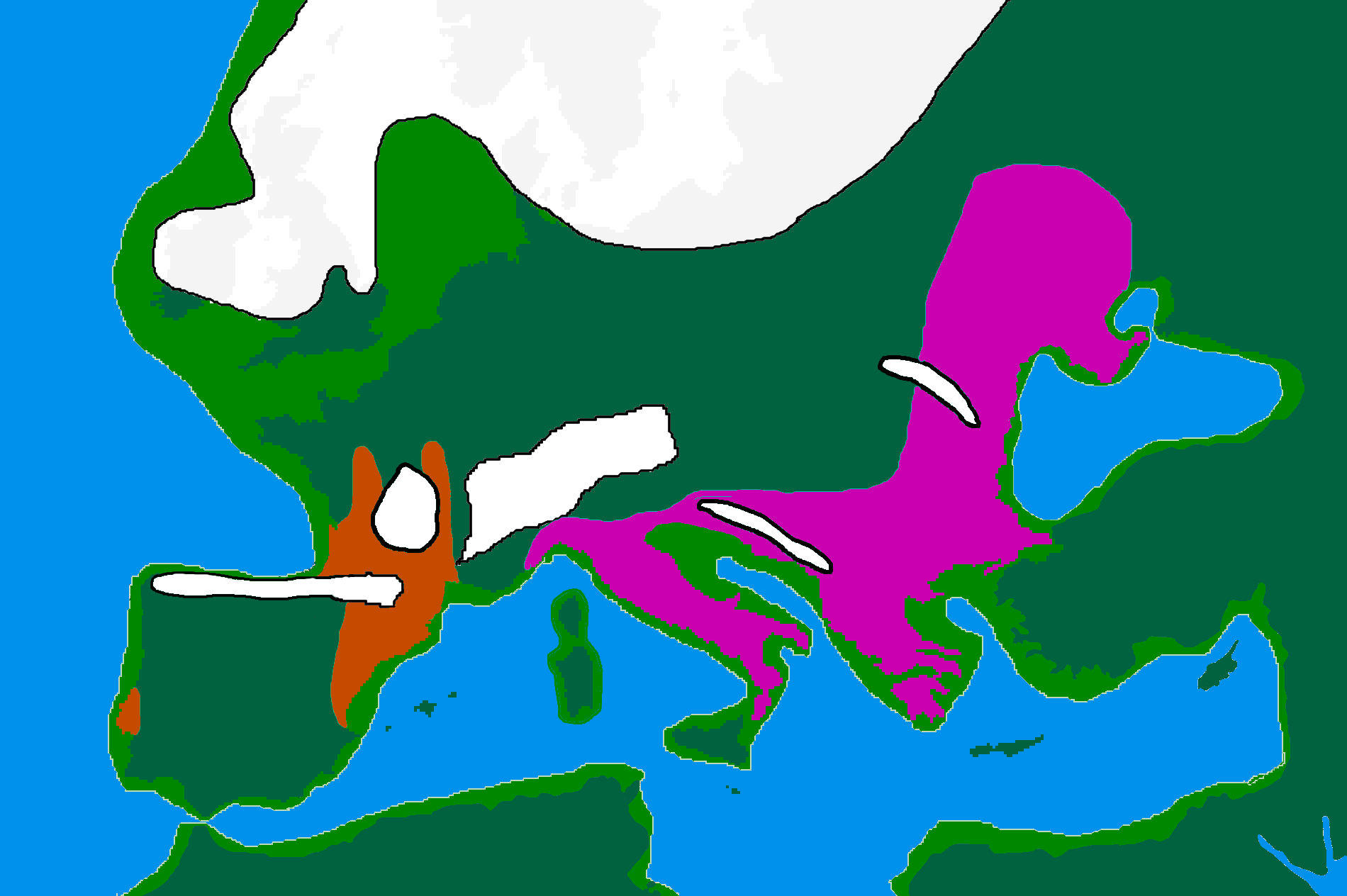
European LGM refuges, 20 kya Solutrean and Proto-Solutrean Cultures Epi-Gravettian Culture

The Last Glacial Maximum ("LGM") started c. 30 ka BCE, at the end of MIS 3, leading to a depopulation of Northern Europe. According to the classical model, people took refuge in climatic sanctuaries (or refugia) as follows:

- Northern Iberia and Southwest France, together making up the "Franco-Cantabrian" refugium
- The Balkans
- Ukraine and more generally the northern coast of the Black Sea
- Italy.

This event decreased the overall genetic diversity in Europe, a "result of drift, consistent with an inferred population bottleneck during the Last Glacial Maximum". As the glaciers receded from about 16,000–13,000 years ago, Europe began to be slowly repopulated by people from refugia, leaving genetic signatures.

Some Y haplogroup I clades appear to have diverged from their parental haplogroups sometime during or shortly after the LGM.

Cinnioglu sees evidence for the existence of an Anatolian refuge, which also harboured Hg R1b1b2. Today, R1b dominates the y chromosome landscape of western Europe, including the British Isles, suggesting that there could have been large population composition changes based on migrations after the LGM.

Semino, Passarino and Pericic place the origins of haplogroup R1a within the Ukrainian ice-age refuge. Its current distribution in eastern Europe and parts of Scandinavia are in part reflective of a re-peopling of Europe from the southern Russian/Ukrainian steppes after the Late Glacial Maximum.

From an mtDNA perspective, Richards et al. found that the majority of mtDNA diversity in Europe is accounted for by post-glacial re-expansions during the late upper Palaeolithic/ Mesolithic. "The regional analyses lend some support to the suggestion that much of western and central Europe was repopulated largely from the southwest when the climate improved. The lineages involved include much of the most common haplogroup, H, as well as much of K, T, W, and X." The study could not determine whether there were new migrations of mtDNA lineages from the near east during this period; a significant input was deemed unlikely.

The alternative model of more refugees was discussed by Bilton et al.

From a study of 51 individuals, researchers were able to identify five separate genetic clusters of ancient Eurasians during the LGM: the Věstonice Cluster (34,000–26,000 years ago), associated with the Gravettian culture; the Mal'ta Cluster (24,000–17,000), associated with the Mal'ta-Buret' culture, the El Mirón Cluster (19,000–14,000 years ago), associated with the Magdalenian culture; the Villabruna Cluster (14,000–7,000 years ago) and the Satsurblia cluster (13,000 to 10,000 years ago).

From around 37,000 years ago, all ancient Europeans began to share some ancestry with modern Europeans. This founding population is represented by GoyetQ116-1, a 35,000 year old specimen from Belgium. This lineage disappears from the record and is not found again until 19,000 BP in Spain at El Mirón, which shows strong affinities to GoyetQ116-1. During this interval, the distinct Věstonice Cluster is predominant in Europe, even at Goyet. The re-expansion of the El Mirón Cluster coincided with warming temperatures following the retreat of the glaciers during the Last Glacial Maximum. From 37,000 to 14,000 years ago, the population of Europe consisted of an isolated population descended from a founding population that did not interbreed significantly with other populations.

=== Mesolithic ===
Mesolithic (post-LGM) populations had diverged significantly due to their relative isolation over several millennia, to the harsh selection pressures during the LGM, and to the founder effects caused by the rapid expansion from LGM refugia in the beginning Mesolithic. By the end of the LGM, around 19 to 11 ka, the familiar varieties of Eurasian phenotypes had emerged. However, the lineage of Mesolithic hunter-gatherers of Western Europe (WHG) does not survive as a majority contribution in any modern population. They were most likely blue eyed, and retained the dark skin pigmentation of pre-LGM EEMH. The HERC2 and OCA2 variations for blue eyes are derived from the WHG lineage were also found in the Yamnaya people.

Around 14,000 years ago, the Villabruna cluster shifted away from GoyetQ116-1 affinity and started to show more affinity with the Near East, a shift which coincided with the warming temperatures of the Bølling-Allerød interstadial. This genetic shift shows that Near East populations had probably already begun moving into Europe during the end of the Upper Paleolithic, about 6,000 years earlier than previously thought, before the introduction of farming. A few specimens from the Villabruna Cluster also show genetic affinities for East Asians that are derived from gene flow. The HERC2 variation for blue eyes first appears around 13,000 to 14,000 years ago in Italy and the Caucasus. The light skin pigmentation characteristic of modern Europeans is estimated to have spread across Europe in a "selective sweep" during the Mesolithic (19 to 11 ka). The associated TYRP1 SLC24A5 and SLC45A2 alleles emerge around 19 ka, still during the LGM, most likely in the Caucasus.

=== Neolithic ===
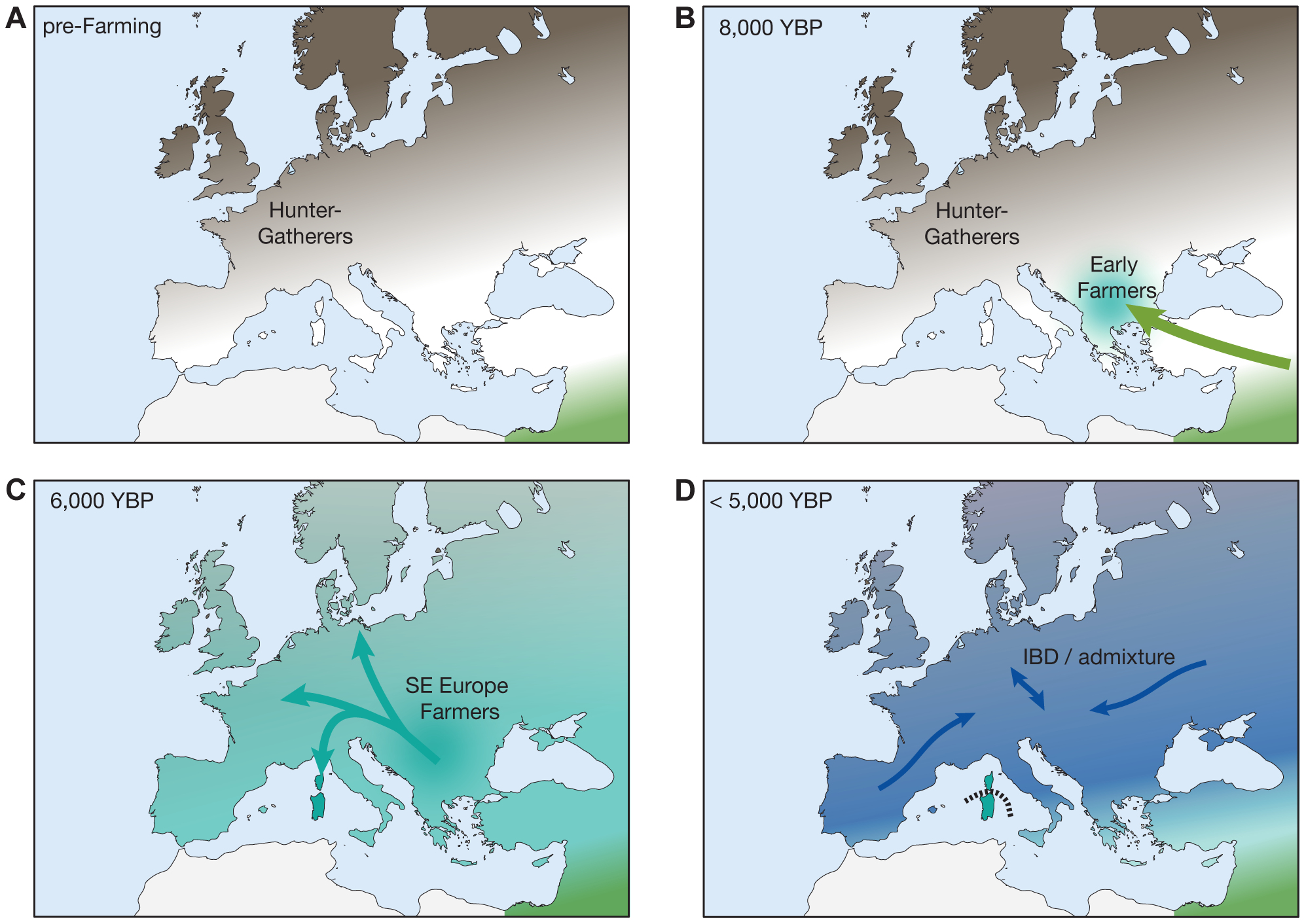
Simplified model for the demographic history of Europeans during the Neolithic period in the introduction of agriculture

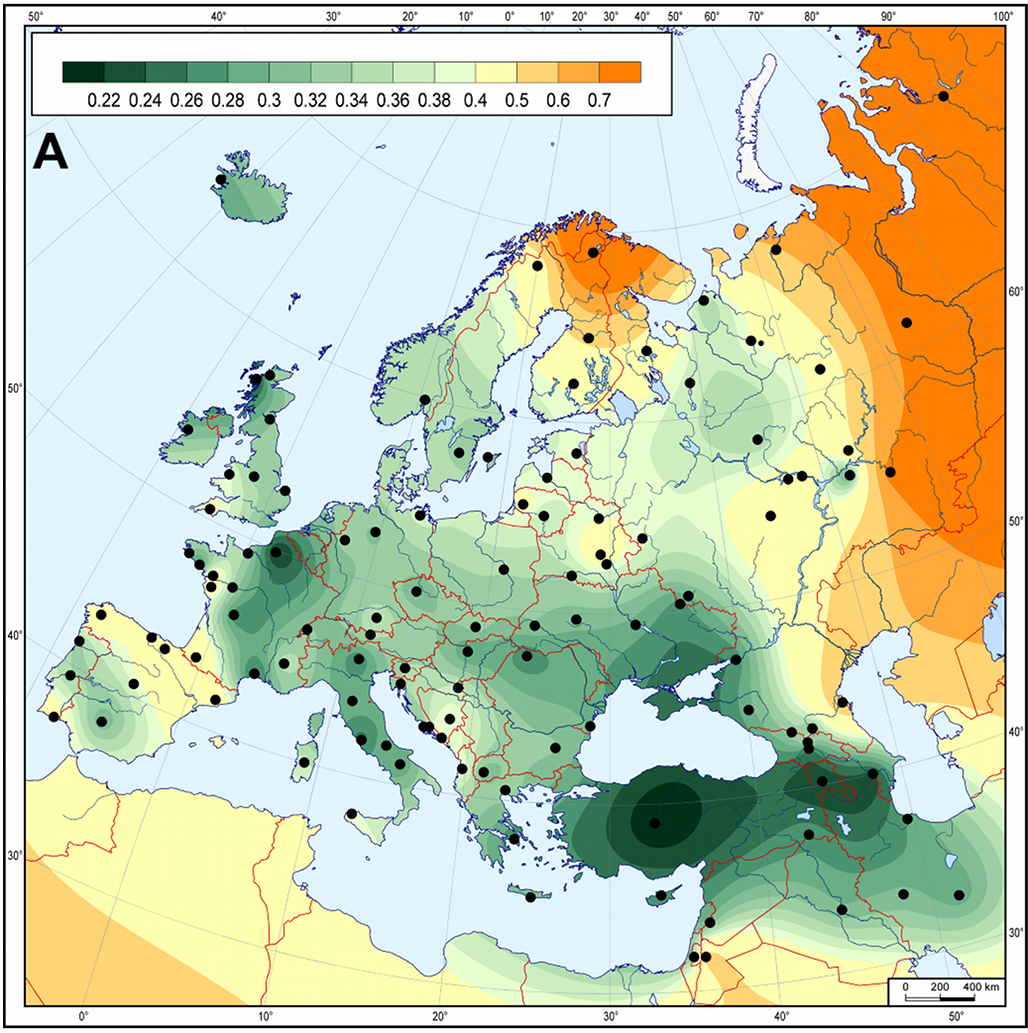
Ancient European Neolithic farmers were genetically closest to modern Near-Eastern/ Anatolian populations. Genetic matrilineal distances between European Neolithic Linear Pottery Culture populations (5,500–4,900 calibrated BC) and modern Western Eurasian populations.

A big cline in genetic variation that has long been recognised in Europe seems to show important dispersals from the direction of the Middle East. This has often been linked to the spread of farming technology during the Neolithic, which has been argued to be one of the most important periods in determining modern European genetic diversity.

The Neolithic started with the introduction of farming, beginning in SE Europe approximately 10,000–3000 BCE, and extending into NW Europe between 4500 and 1700 BCE. During this era, the Neolithic Revolution led to drastic economic as well as socio-cultural changes in Europe and this is also thought to have had a big effect on Europe's genetic diversity, especially concerning genetic lineages entering Europe from the Middle East into the Balkans. There were several phases of this period:

- In a late European Mesolithic prelude to the Neolithic, it appears that Near Eastern peoples from areas that already had farming, and who also had sea-faring technology, had a transient presence in Greece (for example at Franchthi Cave).
- There is consensus that agricultural technology and the main breeds of animals and plants which are farmed entered Europe from somewhere in the area of the Fertile Crescent and specifically the Levant region from the Sinai to Southern Anatolia. (Less certainly, this agricultural revolution is sometimes argued to have in turn been partly triggered by movements of people and technology coming across the Sinai from Africa.) For more see Fertile Crescent: Cosmopolitan diffusion.
- A later stage of the Neolithic, the so-called Pottery Neolithic, saw an introduction of pottery into the Levant, Balkans and Southern Italy (it had been present in the area of modern Sudan for some time before it is found in the Eastern Mediterranean, but it is thought to have developed independently), and this may have also been a period of cultural transfer from the Levant into the Balkans.

An important issue regarding the genetic impact of Neolithic technologies in Europe is the manner by which they were transferred into Europe. Farming was introduced by a significant migration of farmers from the Near East (Cavalli-Sforza's biological demic diffusion model) or a "cultural diffusion" or a combination of the two, and population geneticists have tried to clarify whether any genetic signatures of Near Eastern origin correspond to the expansion routes postulated by the archaeological evidence.

Martin Richards estimated that only 11% of European mtDNA is due to immigration in this period, suggesting that farming was spread primarily due to being adopted by indigenous Mesolithic populations, rather than due to immigration from Near East. Gene flow from SE to NW Europe seems to have continued in the Neolithic, the percentage significantly declining towards the British Isles. Classical genetics also suggested that the largest admixture to the European Paleolithic/Mesolithic stock was due to the Neolithic revolution of the 7th to 5th millennia BCE. Three main mtDNA gene groups have been identified as contributing Neolithic entrants into Europe: J, T1 and U3 (in that order of importance). With others, they amount up to around 20% of the gene pool.

In 2000, Semino's study on Y DNA revealed the presence of haplotypes belonging to the large clade E1b1b1 (E-M35). These were predominantly found in the southern Balkans, southern Italy and parts of Iberia. Semino connected this pattern, along with J haplogroup subclades, to be the Y-DNA component of Cavalli-Sforza's Neolithic demic-diffusion of farmers from the Near East. Rosser et al. rather saw it as a (direct) 'North African component' in European genealogy, although they did not propose a timing and mechanism to account for it. also described E1b1b as representing a late-Pleistocene migration from Africa to Europe over the Sinai Peninsula in Egypt, evidence for which does not show up in mitochondrial DNA.

Concerning timing the distribution and diversity of V13 however, Battaglia proposed an earlier movement whereby the E-M78* lineage ancestral to all modern E-V13 men moved rapidly out of a Southern Egyptian homeland and arrived in Europe with only Mesolithic technologies. They then suggest that the E-V13 sub-clade of E-M78 only expanded subsequently as native Balkan 'foragers-cum-farmers' adopted Neolithic technologies from the Near East. They propose that the first major dispersal of E-V13 from the Balkans may have been in the direction of the Adriatic Sea with the Neolithic Impressed Ware culture often referred to as Impressa or Cardial, rather propose that the main route of E-V13 spread was along the Vardar-Morava-Danube river 'highway' system.

In contrast to Battaglia, Cruciani tentatively suggested (i) a different point where the V13 mutation happened on its way from Egypt to the Balkans via the Middle East, and (ii) a later dispersal time. The authors proposed that the V13 mutation first appeared in western Asia, where it is found in low but significant frequencies, whence it entered the Balkans sometime after 11 kYa. It later experienced a rapid dispersal which he dated to c. 5300 years ago in Europe, coinciding with the Balkan Bronze Age. Like Peričic et al. they consider that "the dispersion of the E-V13 and J-M12 haplogroups seems to have mainly followed the river waterways connecting the southern Balkans to north-central Europe".

More recently, Lacan announced that a 7000-year-old skeleton in a Neolithic context in a Spanish funeral cave, was an E-V13 man. (The other specimens tested from the same site were in haplogroup G2a, which has been found in Neolithic contexts throughout Europe.) Using 7 STR markers, this specimen was identified as being similar to modern individuals tested in Albania, Bosnia, Greece, Corsica, and Provence. The authors therefore proposed that, whether or not the modern distribution of E-V13 of today is a result of more recent events, E-V13 was already in Europe within the Neolithic, carried by early farmers from the Eastern Mediterranean to the Western Mediterranean, much earlier than the Bronze Age. This supports the proposals of Battaglia et al. rather than Cruciani et al. at least concerning earliest European dispersals, but E-V13 may have dispersed more than once. Even more recent than the Bronze Age, it has also been proposed that modern E-V13's modern distribution in Europe is at least partly caused by Roman era movements of people. (See below.)

The migration of Neolithic farmers into Europe brought along several new adaptations. The variation for light skin colour was introduced to Europe by the neolithic farmers. After the arrival of the neolithic farmers, a SLC22A4 mutation was selected for, a mutation which probably arose to deal with ergothioneine deficiency but increases the risk of ulcerative colitis, coeliac disease, and irritable bowel syndrome.

A 2025 study conducted by scientists from the University of Ferrara had found that many of the prehistoric Europeans retained dark skin of their African ancestors until the Bronze and Iron Ages. The analysis suggested that lighter skin had evolved in Europe more sporadically than conventionally believed in academic scholarship. The study had analysed 348 samples pooled from human remains across the British Isles, mainland Europe, Russia, Central Asia, and the Middle East with a chronological range extending from 45,000 to 1,700 years ago.

=== Bronze Age ===
The Bronze Age saw the development of long-distance trading networks, particularly along the Atlantic Coast and in the Danube valley. There was migration from Norway to Orkney and Shetland in this period (and to a lesser extent to mainland Scotland and Ireland). There was also migration from Germany to eastern England. Martin Richards estimated that there was about 4% mtDNA immigration to Europe in the Bronze Age.

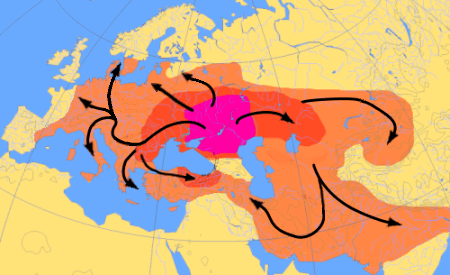
Scheme of Indo-European migrations from ca. 4000 to 1000 BC according to the Kurgan hypothesis

Another theory about the origin of the Indo-European language centres around a hypothetical Proto-Indo-European people, who, according to the Kurgan hypothesis, can be traced to north of the Black and Caspian Seas at about 4500 BCE. They domesticated the horse and possibly invented the wooden disk wheel, and are considered to have spread their culture and genes across Europe. The Y haplogroup R1a is a proposed marker of these "Kurgan" genes, as is the Y Haplogroup R1b, although these haplogroups as a whole may be much older than the language family.

In the far north, carriers of the Y-haplogroup N arrived to Europe from Siberia, eventually expanding as far as Finland, though the specific timing of their arrival is uncertain. The most common North European subclade N1c1 is estimated to be around 8,000 years old. There is evidence of human settlement in Finland dating back to 8500 BCE, linked with the Kunda culture and its putative ancestor, the Swiderian culture, but the latter is thought to have a European origin. The geographical spread of haplogroup N in Europe is well aligned with the Pit–Comb Ware culture, whose emergence is commonly dated c. 4200 BCE, and with the distribution of Uralic languages. Mitochondrial DNA studies of Sami people, haplogroup U5 are consistent with multiple migrations to Scandinavia from Volga-Ural region, starting 6,000 to 7,000 years before present.

The relationship between roles of European and Asian colonists in the prehistory of Finland is a point of some contention. Farther east, the issue is less contentious. Haplogroup N carriers account for a significant part of all non-Slavic ethnic groups in northern Russia, including 37% of Karelians, 35% of Komi people (65% according to another study), 67% of Mari people, as many as 98% of Nenets people, 94% of Nganasans, and 86% to 94% of Yakuts.

The Yamnaya component contains partial ancestry from an Ancient North Eurasian component, a Paleolithic Siberian lineage but closely related to European hunter-gatherers, first identified in Mal'ta. According to Iosif Lazaridis, "the Ancient North Eurasian ancestry is proportionally the smallest component everywhere in Europe, never more than 20 percent, but we find it in nearly every European group we've studied." This genetic component does not come directly from the Mal'ta lineage itself, but a related lineage that separated from the Mal'ta lineage.

Up to a half of the Yamnaya component may have come from a Caucasus hunter-gatherer strand. On November 16, 2015, in a study published in the journal Nature Communications, geneticists announced that they had found a new fourth ancestral "tribe" or "strand" which had contributed to the modern European gene pool. They analysed genomes from two hunter-gatherers from Georgia which were 13,300 and 9,700 years old, and found that these Caucasus hunter-gatherers were probably the source of the farmer-like DNA in the Yamnaya. According to co-author Dr Andrea Manica of the University of Cambridge: "The question of where the Yamnaya come from has been something of a mystery up to now....we can now answer that as we've found that their genetic make-up is a mix of Eastern European hunter-gatherers and a population from this pocket of Caucasus hunter-gatherers who weathered much of the last Ice Age in apparent isolation."

According to Lazaridis et al. (2016), a population related to the people of the Chalcolithic Iran contributed to roughly half of the ancestry of Yamnaya populations of the Pontic–Caspian steppe. These Iranian Chalcolithic people were a mixture of "the Neolithic people of western Iran, the Levant, and Caucasus Hunter Gatherers."

The genetic variations for lactase persistence and greater height came with the Yamnaya people. The derived allele of the KITLG gene (SNP rs12821256) that is associated with – and likely causal for – blond hair in Europeans is found in populations with eastern but not western hunter-gatherers ancestry, suggesting that its origin is in the Ancient North Eurasian (ANE) population and may have been spread in Europe by individuals with steppe ancestry. Consistent with this, the earliest known individual with the derived allele is an ANE individual from the Late Upper Paleolithic Afontova Gora archaeological complex in central Siberia.

=== Recent history ===
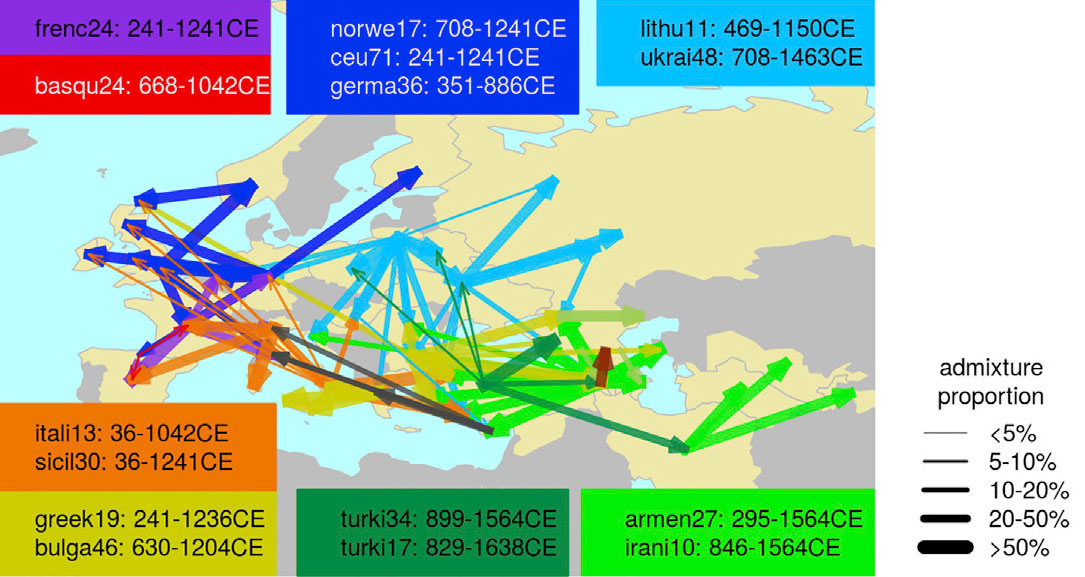
Overview map of recent (1st to 17th centuries AD) admixture events in Europe

Expansions of the Roman Empire do not appear to have left distinct genetic signatures in Europe. Indeed, Romance-speaking populations in the Balkans, like Romanians, Aromanians, Moldovans, etc. have been found to genetically resemble neighbouring Greek and South Slavic-speaking peoples rather than modern Italians. Steven Bird has speculated that E1b1b1a was spread during the Roman era through Thracian and Dacian populations from the Balkans into the rest of Europe.

Concerning the late Roman period of (not only) Germanic "Völkerwanderung", some suggestions have been made, at least for Britain, with Y haplogroup I1a being associated with Anglo-Saxon immigration in eastern England, and R1a being associated with Norse immigration in northern Scotland.

== Genetics of modern European populations ==
=== Patrilineal studies ===
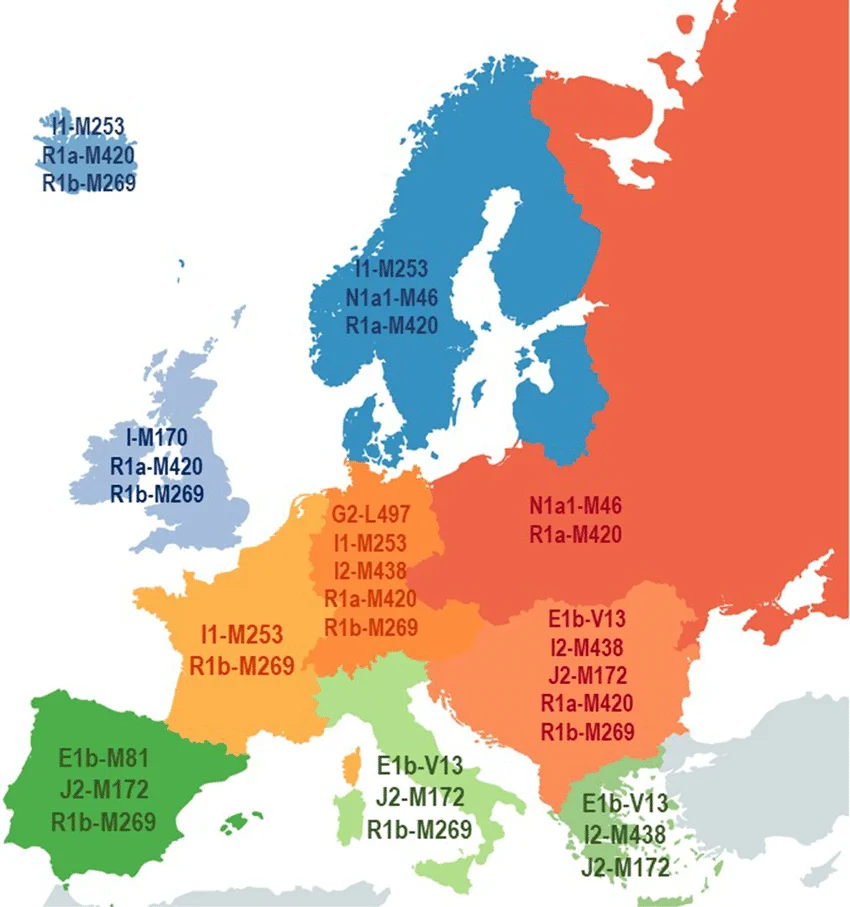
European distribution of predominant Y-chromosome haplogroups.

There are four main Y-chromosome DNA haplogroups that account for most of Europe's patrilineal descent.

- Haplogroup R1b is common in Europe, particularly in Western Europe, with the R1b1a1a2 being the most common among Western Europeans. Nearly all of this R1b in Europe is in the form of the R1b1a2 (2011 name) (R-M269) sub-clade, specifically within the R-L23 sub-sub-clade whereas R1b found in Central Asia, Western Asia and Africa tends to be in other clades. It has also been pointed out that outlier types are present in Europe and are particularly notable in some areas such as Sardinia and Armenia. Haplogroup R1b frequencies vary from highs in western Europe in a steadily decreasing cline with growing distance from the Atlantic: 80–90% (Welsh, Basque, Irish, Scots, Bretons) around 70–80% in Spain, Britain and France and around 40–60% in parts of eastern Germany, and northern Italy. It drops outside this area and is around 30% or less in areas such as southern Italy, Poland, the Balkans and Cyprus. R1b remains the most common clade as one moves east to Germany, while farther east, in Poland, R1a is more common (see below). In Southeast Europe, R1b drops behind R1a in the area in and around Hungary and Serbia but is more common both to the south and north of this region. R1b in Western Europe is dominated by at least two sub-clades, R-U106, which is distributed from the east side of the Rhine into northern and central Europe (with a strong presence in England) and R-P312, which is most common west of the Rhine, including the British Isles.
- Haplogroup R1a, almost entirely in the R1a1a sub-clade, is prevalent in much of Eastern and Central Europe (also in South and Central Asia). For example, there is a sharp increase in R1a1 and decrease in R1b1b2 as one goes east from Germany to Poland. It also has a substantial presence in Scandinavia (particularly Norway). In the Baltic countries R1a frequencies decrease from Lithuania (45%) to Estonia (around 30%).
- Haplogroup I is found in the form of various sub-clades throughout Europe and is found at highest frequencies in the Nordic countries as I1 (Norway, Denmark, Sweden, Finland) and in the Balkan Peninsula as I2a (Bosnia and Herzegovina 65%, Croatia and Serbia). I1 is also frequent in Germany, Great Britain and Netherlands, while I2a is frequent also in Sardinia, Romania/Moldova, Bulgaria and Ukraine. This clade is found at its highest expression by far in Europe and may have been there since before the LGM.
- Haplogroup E1b1b (formerly known as E3b) was part of a migration of Neolithic farmers from the Middle East, which carried E1b1b at low to medium frequency and was introduced into Neolithic Middle Easterners throughout genetic drift from a migration from Africa into the Middle East associated with the Afroasiatic languages. It is believed to have first appeared in Northeast Africa approximately 26,000 years ago and dispersed to North Africa and the Near East during the late Paleolithic and Mesolithic periods. E1b1b lineages are closely linked to the diffusion of Afroasiatic languages. Although present throughout Europe, it peaks in the southern Balkan region amongst Albanians and their neighbors. It is also common in Italy and the Iberian peninsula at lower frequency. Haplogroup E1b1b1, mainly in the form of its E1b1b1a2 (E-V13) sub-clade, reaches frequencies above 47% around the area of Kosovo. This clade is thought to have arrived in Europe from western Asia either in the later Mesolithic, or the Neolithic. North Africa subclade E-M81 is also present in parts of Western and Southern Europe.

Putting aside small enclaves, there are also several haplogroups apart from the above four that are less prominent or most common only in certain areas of Europe.

- Haplogroup G, a common haplogroup among European Neolithic farmers, is common in most parts of Europe at a low frequency, reaching peaks above 70% around Georgia and among the Madjars (although living in Asia they border the eastern perimeter of Europe), up to 10% in Sardinia, 12% in Corsica and Uppsala (Sweden), 11% in the Balkans and Portugal, 10% in Spain and 9% in European Russia. This clade is also found in the Near East.
- Haplogroup N, is common only in the northeast of Europe and in the form of its N1c1 sub-clade reaches frequencies of approximately 60% among Finns and approximately 40% among Estonians, Latvians, and Lithuanians.
- Haplogroup J2, in various sub-clades (J2a, J2b), is found in levels of around 15–30% in the Balkans (particularly Greece) and Italy. Haplogroup J2 is frequent in Western Asia and the Eastern Mediterranean, and may reflect the spread of Anatolian Neolithic farmers.

=== Matrilineal studies ===
There have been a number of studies about the mitochondrial DNA haplogroups (mtDNA) in Europe. In contrast to Y DNA haplogroups, mtDNA haplogroups did not show as much geographical patterning, but were more evenly ubiquitous. Apart from the outlying Saami, all Europeans are characterised by the predominance of haplogroups H, U and T. The lack of observable geographic structuring of mtDNA may be due to socio-cultural factors, namely the phenomena of polygyny and patrilocality.

Genetic studies suggest some maternal gene flow to eastern Europe from eastern Asia or southern Siberia 13,000 – 6,600 years BP. Analysis of Neolithic skeletons in the Great Hungarian Plain found a high frequency of eastern Asian mtDNA haplogroups, some of which survive in modern eastern European populations. Maternal gene flow to Europe from sub-Saharan Africa began as early as 11,000 years BP, although the majority of lineages, approximately 65%, are estimated to have arrived more recently, including during the Romanization period, the Arab conquests of southern Europe, and during the Atlantic slave trade.

=== European population sub-structure ===
Genetically, Europe is relatively homogeneous, but distinct sub-population patterns of various types of genetic markers have been found, particularly along a southeast–northwest cline. For example, Cavalli-Sforza's principal component analyses revealed five major clinal patterns throughout Europe, and similar patterns have continued to be found in more recent studies.

1. A cline of genes with highest frequencies in the Middle East, spreading to lowest levels northwest. Cavalli-Sforza originally described this as faithfully reflecting the spread of agriculture in Neolithic times. This has been the general tendency in interpretation of all genes with this pattern.
2. A cline of genes with highest frequencies among Finnish and Sami in the extreme north east, and spreading to lowest frequencies in the south west.
3. A cline of genes with highest frequencies in the area of the lower Don and Volga rivers in southern Russia, and spreading to lowest frequencies in Spain, Southern Italy, Greece and the areas inhabited by Saami speakers in the extreme north of Scandinavia. Cavalli-Sforza associated this with the spread of Indo-European languages, which he links in turn to a "secondary expansion" after the spread of agriculture, associated with animal grazing.
4. A cline of genes with highest frequencies in the Balkans and Southern Italy, spreading to lowest levels in Britain and the Basque country. Cavalli-Sforza associates this with "the Greek expansion, which reached its peak in historical times around 1000 and 500 BCE but which certainly began earlier".
5. A cline of genes with highest frequencies in the Basque country, and lower levels beyond the area of Iberia and Southern France. In perhaps the most well-known conclusion from Cavalli-Sforza, this weakest of the five patterns was described as isolated remnants of the pre-Neolithic population of Europe, "who at least partially withstood the expansion of the cultivators". It corresponds roughly to the geographical spread of rhesus negative blood types. In particular, the conclusion that the Basques are a genetic isolate has become widely discussed, but also a controversial conclusion.

He also created a phylogenetic tree to analyse the internal relationships among Europeans. He found four major 'outliers'- Basques, Sami, Sardinians and Icelanders; a result he attributed to their relative isolation (note: the Icelanders and the Sardinians speak Indo-European languages, while the other two groups do not). Greeks and Yugoslavs represented a second group of less extreme outliers. The remaining populations clustered into several groups : "Celtic", "Germanic", "south-western Europeans", "Scandinavians" and "eastern Europeans".

A study conducted in May of 2009 researching 19 populations from Europe using 270,000 SNPs highlighted the genetic diversity of European populations corresponding to the northwest to southeast gradient and distinguished "four several distinct regions" within Europe:

- Finland, showing the greatest distance to the rest of Europeans.
- the Baltic region (Estonia, Latvia and Lithuania), western Russia and eastern Poland.
- Central and Western Europe.
- Italy, due to the alps acting as a great genetic barrier.

In this study, barrier analysis revealed "genetic barriers" between Finland, Italy and other countries and that barriers could also be demonstrated within Finland (between Helsinki and Kuusamo) and Italy (between northern and southern part, Fst=0.0050). Fst (Fixation index) was found to correlate considerably with geographic distances ranging from ≤0.0010 for neighbouring populations to 0.0200–0.0230 for Southern Italy and Finland. For comparisons, pair-wise Fst of non-European samples were as follows: Europeans – Africans (Yoruba) 0.1530; Europeans – Chinese 0.1100; Africans (Yoruba) – Chinese 0.1900.

A study by Chao Tian in August 2009 extended the analysis of European population genetic structure to include additional southern European groups and levantine populations (Palestinians, Druzes...) from the Near-East. This study determined autosomal Fst between 18 population groups and concluded that, in general, genetic distances corresponded to geographical relationships with smaller values between population groups with origins in neighbouring countries/regions (for example, Greeks/Tuscans: Fst=0.0010, Greeks/Palestinians: Fst=0.0057) compared with those from very different regions in Europe (for example Greeks/Swedish: Fst=0.0087, Greeks/Russians: Fst=0.0108).

==== Autosomal DNA ====
East Asian ancestry is found at low frequency among some Europeans, such as British (2.5 ± 1%), Orcadians (3.8 ± 1%), French (0.7 ± 0.8%) and Germans (2.7 ± 0.8%). Finns and Russians have roughly 10% East Asian ancestry (northwestern Russians, Sami, and Uralic-speaking minorities in Russia have even more); most of this can be attributed to historic populations speaking Uralic languages coming from Siberia. This Siberian component is itself a composition of Ancient North Eurasian and East Asian-related ancestry from Eastern Siberia, maximized among Evenks and Evens or Nganasans. The spread of this ancestry is linked by some geneticists to the dispersal of Uralic languages; others, however, maintain that the Uralic languages spread prior to the arrival of Siberian geneflow, which is a secondary source of diversity within Uralic-speaking populations. Genetic data points to a western Siberian hunter-gatherer origin of the observed Siberian geneflow among Uralic-speaking groups. Western Siberian hunter-gatherers were characterized by high Ancient North Eurasian ancestry and lower amounts of Eastern Siberian admixture. Genetic data on Volga Tatars or Chuvash, found among "Western Turkic speakers, like Chuvash and Volga Tatar, the East Asian component was detected only in low amounts (~ 5%)". The Lipka Tatars, a Turkic minority in Belarus, have significant East Eurasian ancestry, making up one-third of their genome.

Two whole-genome studies of the two Eastern European populations in Ukraine (Ukrainians from Ukraine) and Russia (Russians from Russia) showed genomic diversity, which has not been represented in the previous genomic surveys, as studies in Europe are mostly biased towards the populations in the western part of the continent. Within Russia, Komi people, a Uralic group living in the northeastern regions, form a pole of genetic diversity that is distinct from other populations, and characterized by a higher European hunter-gatherer (WHG) and Ancient North Eurasian ancestry.

Seldin (2006) used over 5,000 autosomal SNPs. It showed "a consistent and reproducible distinction between 'northern' and 'southern' European population groups". Most individual participants with southern European ancestry (Italians, Greeks, Portuguese, Spaniards), and Ashkenazi Jews have >85% membership in the southern population; and most northern, western, central, and eastern Europeans (Swedes, English, Irish, Germans, and Ukrainians) have >90% in the northern population group. Many of the participants in this study were American citizens who self-identified with different European ethnicities based on self-reported familial pedigree.

A similar study in 2007 using samples predominantly from Europe found that the most important genetic differentiation in Europe occurs on a line from the north to the south-east (northern Europe to the Balkans), with another east–west axis of differentiation across Europe. Its findings were consistent with earlier results based on mtDNA and Y-chromosomal DNA that support the theory that modern Iberians (Spanish and Portuguese) hold the most ancient European genetic ancestry, as well as separating Basques and Sami from other European populations.

It suggested that the English and Irish cluster with other Northern and Eastern Europeans such as Germans and Poles, while some Basque and Italian individuals also clustered with Northern Europeans. Despite these stratifications, it noted that "there is low apparent diversity in Europe with the entire continent-wide samples only marginally more dispersed than single population samples elsewhere in the world".

In 2008, two international research teams published analyses of large-scale genotyping of large samples of Europeans, using over 300,000 autosomal SNPs. With the exception of usual isolates such as Basques, Finns and Sardinians, the European population lacked sharp discontinuities (clustering) as previous studies have found (see Seldin et al. 2006 and Bauchet et al. 2007), although there was a discernible south to north gradient. Overall, they found only a low level of genetic differentiation between subpopulations, and differences which did exist were characterised by a strong continent-wide correlation between geographic and genetic distance. In addition, they found that diversity was greatest in southern Europe due a larger effective population size and/or population expansion from southern to northern Europe. The researchers take this observation to imply that genetically, Europeans are not distributed into discrete populations.

According to geneticist David Reich, based on ancient human genomes that his laboratory sequenced in 2016, Europeans descend from a mixture of four West-Eurasian ancestral components, namely WHG (western hunter-gatherers), EHG, Neolithic farmers from the Levant/Anatolia as well as from Neolithic farmers from Iran (often summarized as "EEF"; early European farmers), in varying degrees.

Like other Eurasian populations, Mesolithic, Neolithic or Bronze Age ancestries are not homogenously distributed in European populations. But WHG-related ancestries are highest in present-day individuals from the Baltic States, Belarus, Poland and Russia whilst EHG-related ancestries are highest in Finland and Estonia. Steppe-related ancestries are found in high levels in northern Europe, peaking in Ireland, Iceland, Norway and Sweden, but decrease further south, especially in southern Europe, where Neolithic Anatolian-related farmer ancestries dominate.

==== Autosomal genetic distances (Fst) based on SNPs (2009) ====
The genetic distance between populations is often measured by Fixation index (Fst), based on genetic polymorphism data, such as single-nucleotide polymorphisms (SNPs) or microsatellites. Fst is a special case of F-statistics, the concept developed in the 1920s by Sewall Wright. Fst is simply the correlation of randomly chosen alleles within the same sub-population relative to that found in the entire population. It is often expressed as the proportion of genetic diversity due to allele frequency differences among populations.

The values range from 0 to 1. A zero value implies that the two populations are panmictic, that they are interbreeding freely. A value of one would imply that the two populations are completely separate. The greater the Fst value, the greater the genetic distance. Essentially, these low Fst values suggest that the majority of genetic variation is at the level of individuals within the same population group (~ 85%); whilst belonging to a different population group within same 'race'/ continent, and even to different racial/ continental groups added a much smaller degree of variation (3–8%; 6–11%, respectively).

Intra-European/Mediterranean Autosomal genetic distances (Fst) based on 3,500 SNPs using the Weir and Cockerham algorithm
	Italian Americans	Palestinians	Swedes	Druzes	Spaniards	Germans	Russians	Irish	Greek Americans	Ashkenazi Jews	Circassians
Italian Americans		0.0064	0.0064	0.0057	0.0010	0.0029	0.0088	0.0048	0.0000	0.0040	0.0067
Palestinians	0.0064		0.0191	0.0064	0.0101	0.0136	0.0202	0.0170	0.0057	0.0093	0.0108
Swedes	0.0064	0.0191		0.0167	0.0040	0.0007	0.0030	0.0020	0.0084	0.0120	0.0117
Druzes	0.0057	0.0064	0.0167		0.0096	0.0121	0.0194	0.0154	0.0052	0.0088	0.0092
Spaniards	0.0010	0.0101	0.0040	0.0096		0.0015	0.0070	0.0037	0.0035	0.0056	0.0090
Germans	0.0029	0.0136	0.0007	0.0121	0.0015		0.0030	0.0010	0.0039	0.0072	0.0089
Russians	0.0088	0.0202	0.0030	0.0194	0.0070	0.0030		0.0038	0.0108	0.0137	0.0120
Irish	0.0048	0.0170	0.0020	0.0154	0.0037	0.0010	0.0038		0.0067	0.0109	0.0110
Greek Americans	0.0000	0.0057	0.0084	0.0052	0.0035	0.0039	0.0108	0.0067		0.0042	0.0054
Ashkenazi Jews	0.0040	0.0093	0.0120	0.0088	0.0056	0.0072	0.0137	0.0109	0.0042		0.0107
Circassians	0.0067	0.0108	0.0117	0.0092	0.0090	0.0089	0.0120	0.0110	0.0054	0.0107	

European Population Genetic Substructure based on SNPs
	Austria	Bulgaria	Czech Republic	Estonia	Finland (Helsinki)	Finland (Kuusamo)	France	Northern Germany	Southern Germany	Hungary	Northern Italy	Southern Italy	Latvia	Lithuania	Poland	Russia	Spain	Sweden	Switzerland	CEU	
Austria		1.14	1.08	1.58	2.24	3.30	1.16	1.10	1.04	1.04	1.49	1.79	1.85	1.70	1.19	1.47	1.41	1.21	1.19	1.12	Austria
Bulgaria	1.14		1.21	1.70	2.19	2.91	1.22	1.32	1.19	1.10	1.32	1.38	1.86	1.73	1.29	1.53	1.30	1.47	1.13	1.29	Bulgaria
Czech Republic	1.08	1.21		1.42	2.20	3.26	1.35	1.15	1.16	1.06	1.69	2.04	1.62	1.48	1.09	1.27	1.63	1.26	1.37	1.21	Czech Republic
Estonia	1.58	1.70	1.42		1.71	2.80	2.08	1.53	1.70	1.41	2.42	2.93	1.24	1.28	1.17	1.21	2.54	1.49	2.16	1.59	Estonia
Finland (Helsinki)	2.24	2.19	2.20	1.71		1.86	2.69	2.17	2.35	1.87	2.82	3.37	2.31	2.33	1.75	2.10	3.14	1.89	2.77	1.99	Finland (Helsinki)
Finland (Kuusamo)	3.30	2.91	3.26	2.80	1.86		3.72	3.27	3.46	2.68	3.64	4.18	3.33	3.37	2.49	3.16	4.21	2.87	3.83	2.89	Finland (Kuusamo)
France	1.16	1.22	1.35	2.08	2.69	3.72		1.25	1.12	1.16	1.38	1.68	2.40	2.20	1.44	1.94	1.13	1.38	1.10	1.13	France
Northern Germany	1.10	1.32	1.15	1.53	2.17	3.27	1.25		1.08	1.11	1.72	2.14	1.84	1.66	1.18	1.49	1.62	1.12	1.36	1.06	Northern Germany
Southern Germany	1.04	1.19	1.16	1.70	2.35	3.46	1.12	1.08		1.08	1.53	1.85	1.20	1.84	1.23	1.58	1.40	1.21	1.17	1.07	Southern Germany
Hungary	1.04	1.10	1.06	1.41	1.87	2.68	1.16	1.11	1.08		1.42	1.63	1.58	1.46	1.14	1.28	1.32	1.22	1.16	1.13	Hungary
Northern Italy	1.49	1.32	1.69	2.42	2.82	3.64	1.38	1.72	1.53	1.42		1.54	2.64	2.48	1.75	2.24	1.42	1.86	1.36	1.56	Northern Italy
Southern Italy	1.79	1.38	2.04	2.93	3.37	4.18	1.68	2.14	1.85	1.63	1.54		3.14	2.96	1.99	2.68	1.67	2.28	1.54	1.84	Southern Italy
Latvia	1.85	1.86	1.62	1.24	2.31	3.33	2.40	1.84	1.20	1.58	2.64	3.14		1.20	1.26	1.84	2.82	1.89	2.52	1.87	Latvia
Lithuania	1.70	1.73	1.48	1.28	2.33	3.37	2.20	1.66	1.84	1.46	2.48	2.96	1.20		1.20	1.26	2.62	1.74	2.29	1.74	Lithuania
Poland	1.19	1.29	1.09	1.17	1.75	2.49	1.44	1.18	1.23	1.14	1.75	1.99	1.26	1.20		1.18	1.66	1.30	1.46	1.28	Poland
Russia	1.47	1.53	1.27	1.21	2.10	3.16	1.94	1.49	1.58	1.28	2.24	2.68	1.84	1.26	1.18		2.32	1.59	1.20	1.56	Russia
Spain	1.41	1.30	1.63	2.54	3.14	4.21	1.13	1.62	1.40	1.32	1.42	1.67	2.82	2.62	1.66	2.32		1.73	1.16	1.34	Spain
Sweden	1.21	1.47	1.26	1.49	1.89	2.87	1.38	1.12	1.21	1.22	1.86	2.28	1.89	1.74	1.30	1.59	1.73		1.50	1.09	Sweden
Switzerland	1.19	1.13	1.37	2.16	2.77	3.83	1.10	1.36	1.17	1.16	1.36	1.54	2.52	2.29	1.46	1.20	1.16	1.50		1.21	Switzerland
CEU	1.12	1.29	1.21	1.59	1.99	2.89	1.13	1.06	1.07	1.13	1.56	1.84	1.87	1.74	1.28	1.56	1.34	1.09	1.21		CEU
	Austria	Bulgaria	Czech Republic	Estonia	Finland (Helsinki)	Finland (Kuusamo)	France	Northern Germany	Southern Germany	Hungary	Northern Italy	Southern Italy	Latvia	Lithuania	Poland	Russia	Spain	Sweden	Switzerland	CEU	

CEU – Utah residents with ancestry from Northern and Western Europe.

== History of research ==
=== Classical genetic markers (by proxy) ===
One of the first scholars to perform genetic studies was Luigi Luca Cavalli-Sforza. He used classical genetic markers to analyse DNA by proxy. This method studies differences in the frequencies of particular allelic traits, namely polymorphisms from proteins found within human blood (such as the ABO blood groups, Rhesus blood antigens, HLA loci, immunoglobulins, G6PD isoenzymes, among others). Subsequently, his team calculated genetic distance between populations, based on the principle that two populations that share similar frequencies of a trait are more closely related than populations that have more divergent frequencies of the trait.

From this, he constructed phylogenetic trees that showed genetic distances diagrammatically. His team also performed principal component analyses, which is good at analysing multivariate data with minimal loss of information. The information that is lost can be partly restored by generating a second principal component, and so on. In turn, the information from each individual principal component (PC) can be presented graphically in synthetic maps. These maps show peaks and troughs, which represent populations whose gene frequencies take extreme values compared to others in the studied area.

Peaks and troughs usually connected by smooth gradients are called clines. Genetic clines can be generated by adaptation to environment (natural selection), continuous gene flow between two initially different populations or a demographic expansion into a scarcely populated environment, with little initial admixture with existing populations. Cavalli-Sforza connected these gradients with postulated pre-historical population movements, based on archaeological and linguistic theories. However, given that the time depths of such patterns are not known, "associating them with particular demographic events is usually speculative".

=== Direct DNA analysis ===
Studies using direct DNA analysis are now abundant and may use mitochondrial DNA (mtDNA), the non-recombining portion of the Y chromosome (NRY), or even autosomal DNA. MtDNA and NRY DNA share some similar features, which have made them particularly useful in genetic anthropology. These properties include the direct, unaltered inheritance of mtDNA and NRY DNA from mother to offspring and father to son, respectively, without the 'scrambling' effects of genetic recombination. We also presume that these genetic loci are not affected by natural selection and that the major process responsible for changes in base pairs has been mutation (which can be calculated).

The smaller effective population size of the NRY and mtDNA enhances the consequences of drift and founder effect, relative to the autosomes, making NRY and mtDNA variation a potentially sensitive index of population composition. These biologically plausible assumptions are not concrete; Rosser suggests that climatic conditions may affect the fertility of certain lineages.

The underlying mutation rate used by the geneticists is more questionable. They often use different mutation rates and studies frequently arrive at vastly different conclusions. NRY and mtDNA may be so susceptible to drift that some ancient patterns may have become obscured. Another assumption is that population genealogies are approximated by allele genealogies. Guido Barbujani points out that this only holds if population groups develop from a genetically monomorphic set of founders. Barbujani argues that there is no reason to believe that Europe was colonised by monomorphic populations. This would result in an overestimation of haplogroup age, thus falsely extending the demographic history of Europe into the Late Paleolithic rather than the Neolithic era. Greater certainty about chronology may be obtained from studies of ancient DNA (see below), but so far these have been comparatively few.

Whereas Y-DNA and mtDNA haplogroups represent but a small component of a person's DNA pool, autosomal DNA has the advantage of containing hundreds of thousands of examinable genetic loci, thus giving a more complete picture of genetic composition. Descent relationships can only be determined on a statistical basis, because autosomal DNA undergoes recombination. A single chromosome can record a history for each gene. Autosomal studies are much more reliable for showing the relationships between existing populations, but do not offer the possibilities for unravelling their histories in the same way as mtDNA and NRY DNA studies promise, despite their many complications.

Genetic studies operate on numerous assumptions and suffer from methodological limitations, such as selection bias and confounding phenomena like genetic drift, foundation and bottleneck effects cause large errors, particularly in haplogroup studies. No matter how accurate the methodology, conclusions derived from such studies are compiled on the basis of how the author envisages their data fits with established archaeological or linguistic theories.

== See also ==
General

- Archaeogenetics
- Ethnic groups in Europe
- European studies
- Genetic history of North Africa
- Genetic history of the Middle East
- Genetics and archaeogenetics of South Asia
- History of Europe
- Human genetic variation
- Y-DNA haplogroups in populations of Europe
- Romani people#Genetic evidence

Genetics by European group

- Genetic history of Italy
- Genetic history of the British Isles
- Genetic history of the Iberian Peninsula
- Genetic studies on Bosniaks
- Genetic studies on Bulgarians
- Genetic studies on Croats
- Genetic studies on Jews
- Genetic studies on Russians
- Genetic studies on Sami
- Genetic studies on Serbs
- Genetic studies on Turkish people
- Genetic studies on Irish people
