= Parfenyevsky District =

Parfenyevsky District Парфеньевский район (Russian)
- District
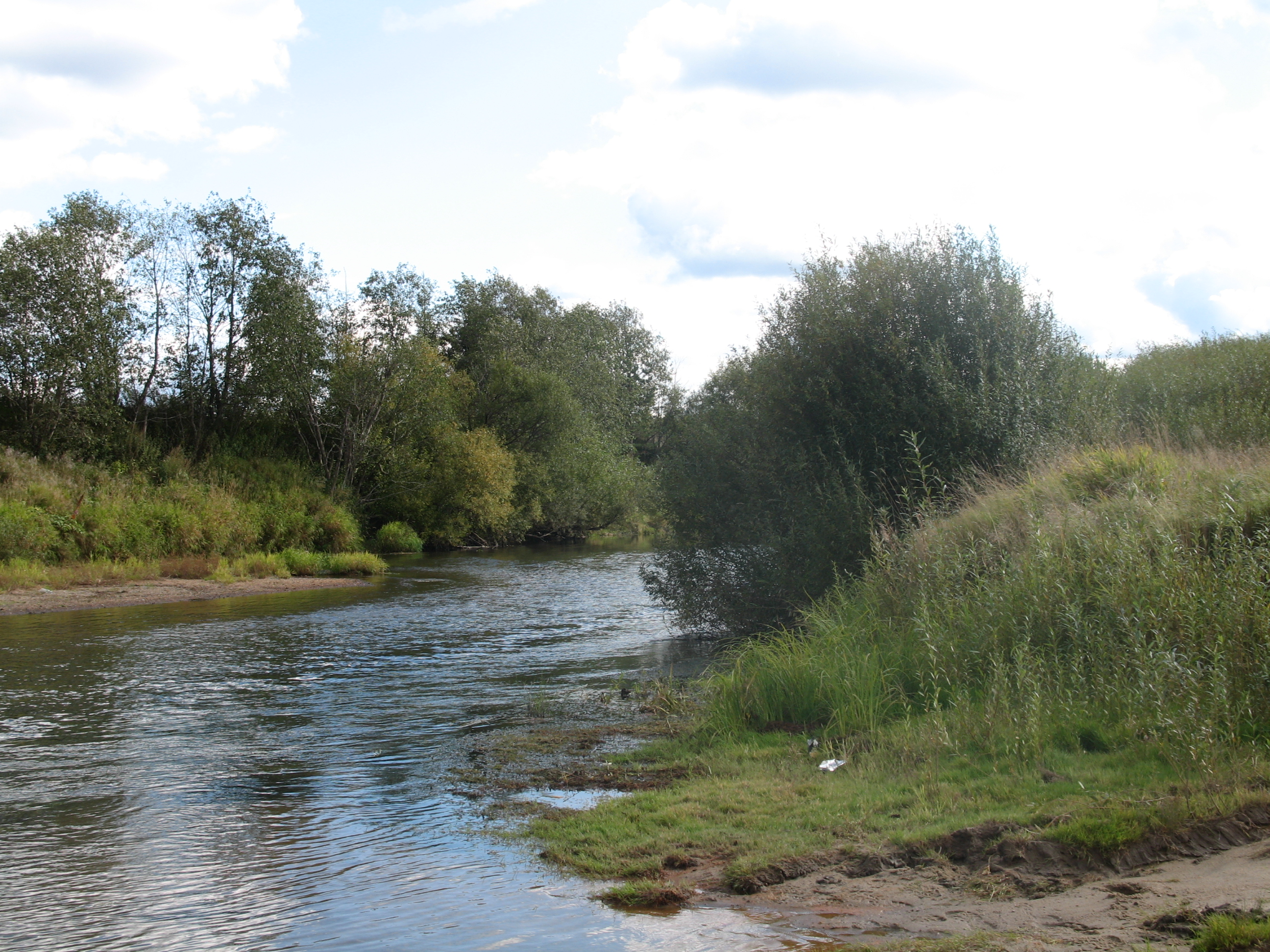
- Neya River near Parfenevo village, Parfenyevsky District

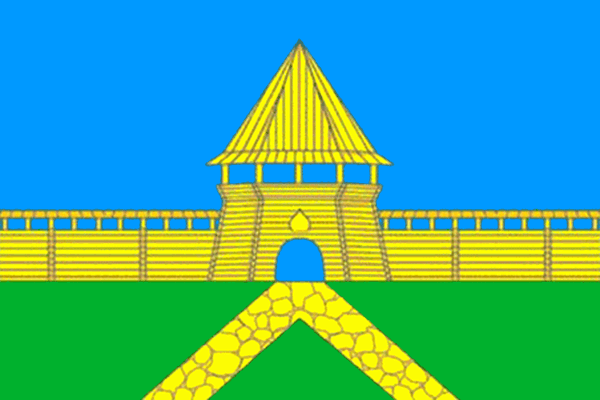
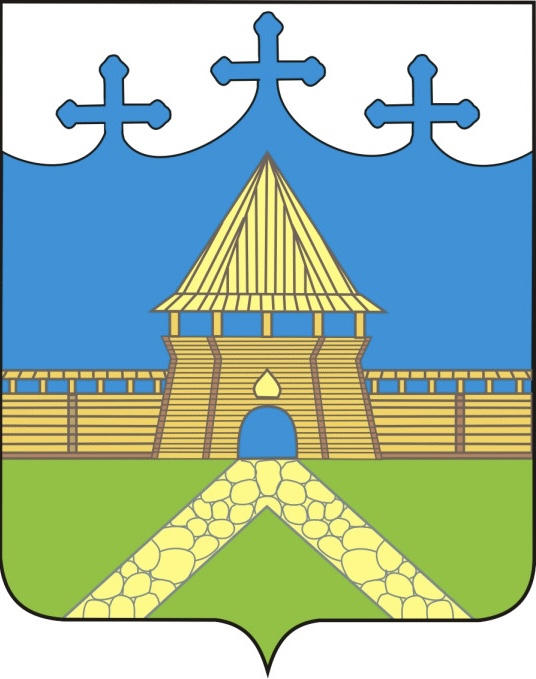
- Flag Coat of arms
- Location of Parfenyevsky District in Kostroma Oblast
- Coordinates: 58°28′56″N 43°24′33″E
- Country: Russia
- Federal subject: Kostroma Oblast
- Established: 1929
- Administrative center: Parfenyevo

Area
  - Total: 2,460 km^{2} (950 sq mi)

Population (2010 Census)
  - Total: 6,391
  - Density: 2.60/km^{2} (6.73/sq mi)
  - Urban: 0%
  - Rural: 100%

Administrative structure
  - Administrative divisions: 4 Settlements
  - Inhabited localities: 109 rural localities

Municipal structure
  - Municipally incorporated as: Parfenyevsky Municipal District
  - Municipal divisions: 0 urban settlements, 4 rural settlements
- Time zone: UTC+3 (MSK)
- OKTMO ID: 34634000
- Website: http://www.parfenyevo.ru/

Parfenyevsky District (Russian: Парфе́ньевский райо́н) is an administrative and municipal district (raion), one of the twenty-four in Kostroma Oblast, Russia. It is located in the center of the oblast. The area of the district is 2,460 square kilometers (950 sq mi). Its administrative center is the rural locality (a selo) of Parfenyevo. Population: 4,515 (2021 census); 6,391 (2010 census); 7,857 (2002 Census); 8,955 (1989 Soviet census). The population of Parfenyevo accounts for 44.9% of the district's total population.

== Geography ==
Parfenyevsky District is located in the center of Kostroma Oblast. The terrain is flat or slightly hilly, with pine-larch forests (southern taiga) covering 84% of the district, including some old-growth stands of cedars and oak. Pleistocene glaciation left a landscape of alluvial outwash, moraines, swamps, and lakes. The upper courses of the Neya River are in the district. Parfenyevsky District is 150 km northeast of the regional city of Kostroma, and about 480 km northeast of Moscow. The area measures 75 km (north-south), and 55 km (west-east); total area is 2,460 km2 (about 4.1% of Kostroma Oblast). The administrative center is the town of Parfenyevo.

The district is bordered on the north by Chukhlomsky District and Kologrivsky District, on the east by Neysky District, and on the southwest by Antropovsky District.

== History ==
Historical records suggest that Parfenyevo was founded in 1521 as a fortress in the Kazan line, which protected Moscow from invasion by Tatars and Cheremis (Mari people). The town was on a main trade route to the Vyatka Region and Siberia, and in 1707 was included into the Arkhangelsk region. It was formally formed into a district of Kostroma Oblast in 1929. The economy of the area is centered on logging and woodworking.
