= Genetic studies on Sami =

DNA analysis of Sami populations

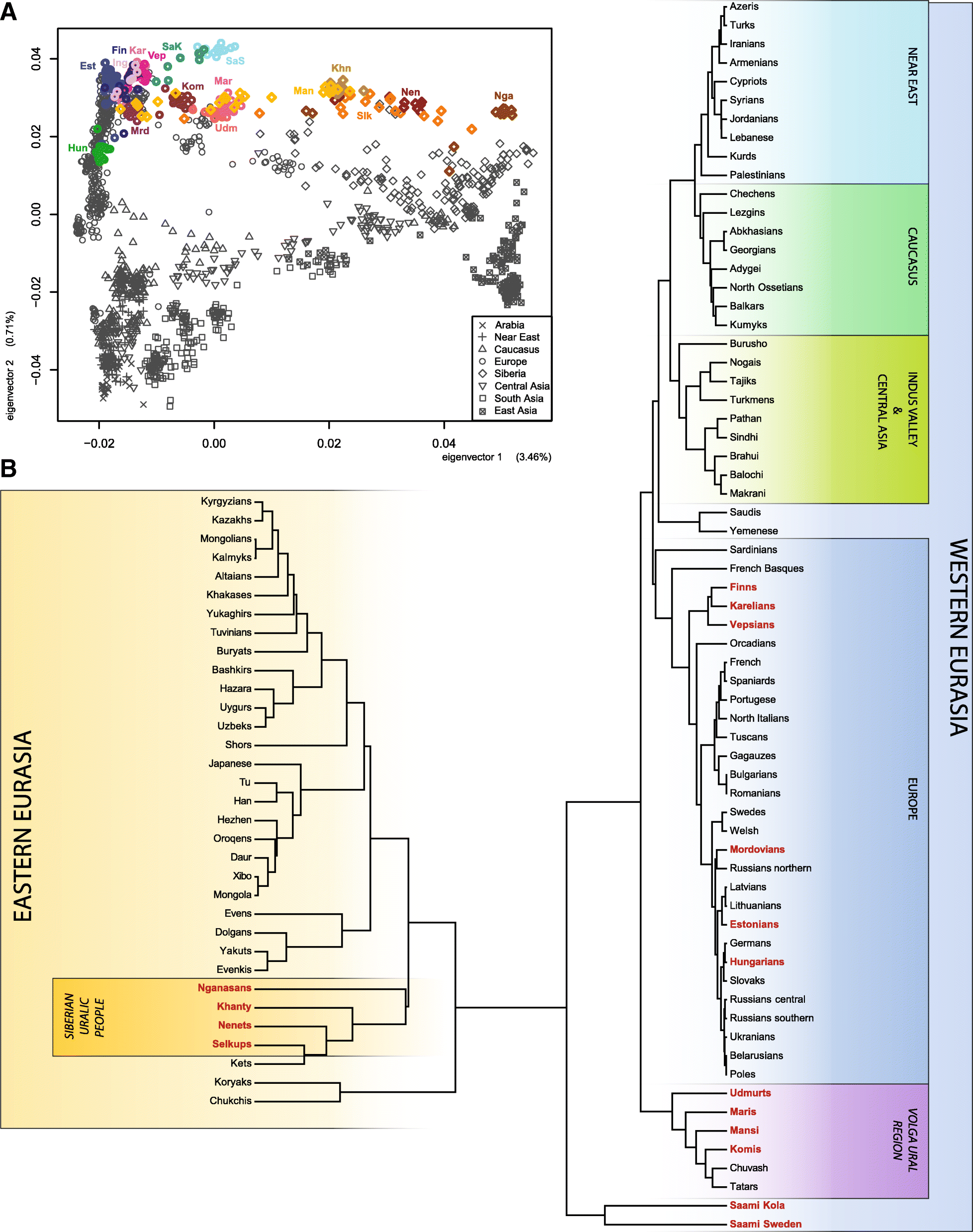
PCA and genetic distances of Uralic-speaking populations

Genetic studies on Sami is the genetic research that have been carried out on the Sami people. The Sami languages belong to the Uralic languages family of Eurasia.

Siberian origins are still visible in the Sámi and most of the other populations of the Finno-Ugric language family.

An abundance of genes has journeyed all the way from Siberia to Finland. As late as the Iron Age, people with a genome similar to that of the Sámi people lived much further south in Finland compared to today. The first study on the DNA of the ancient inhabitants of Finland has been published, with results indicating that a copious number of Siberian genetic variants are present in modern Sami populations.

Genetic material from remains associated with Neo-Siberians has been found in the inhabitants of the Kola Peninsula from as far back as approximately 3,500 years ago, later spreading also to Finland. The study also corroborates the assumption that people genetically similar to the Sámi lived much further south than currently. Neo-Siberian populations diverged from East Asian people >11,000 years ago and expanded into Siberia, where they mixed with and replaced the previous Paleosiberian peoples. The spread of early Neo-Siberian ancestry westwards may be associated with the dispersal of Uralic languages.

The genetic samples compared in the study were collected from human bones found in a 3,500-year-old burial place in the Kola Peninsula and the 1,500-year-old lake burial site at Levänluhta in South Ostrobothnia, Finland. All of the samples contained identical Siberian genes.

== Y-DNA ==
Three Y chromosome haplogroups dominate the distribution among the Sami: N1c (formerly N3a), I1 (today more commonly known as I-M253) and R1a, at least in the study carried out by K. Tambets et al. in 2004. The most common haplogroup among the Sami is N1c, with I1 as a close second according to that study. Haplogroup R1a in Sami is mostly seen in the Swedish Sami and Kola Sami populations, with a low level among the Finnish Sami according to Tambets and colleagues, a finding that suggests that N1c and R1a probably reached Fennoscandia from eastern Europe, where these haplogroups can be found in high frequencies. In Finland there is also a general difference within the Finnish population between eastern and western Finland, where eastern show a dominance of N-haplogroup and the west a dominance of I-haplogroup, where the latter is explained by a migration from southern parts of today's Norway and Sweden over to Finland as we know it today.

But the spread of R1a-haplogroup amongst Sami in Sweden shows a big span from 10.1% to 36.0%, with an average of 20%, to be compared with Sami in Finland with a span from 9% to 9.9% Because Sami groups in Sweden show differences between haplogroups – such as U5b and V even thought that are mtDNA-groups – in the south of Sweden and in the north of the country (see below), the spread of Y-haplogroups such as R1a amongst groups of Sami in Sweden might be significant as well. As of April 2022, no such known study had yet been conducted though.

However the two haplogroups R1a and N1c have a distinctly distribution when it comes to language. R1a is common among Eastern Europeans speaking Indo-European languages, while N1c correlates closely with the distribution of the Finno-Ugrian languages. For example, N1c is common among the Finns, while haplogroup R1a is common among all the neighbours of the Sami.

Haplogroup I1 is the most common haplogroup in Sweden, and the Jokkmokk Sami in Sweden have similar structure to Swedes and Finns for haplogroup I1 and N1c. Haplogroup I-M253 in Sami is explained by immigration (of men) during the 14th century.

== mtDNA ==
Classification of the Sami mtDNA lineages revealed that the majority are clustered in a subset of the European mtDNA pool. The two haplogroups haplogroup V and haplogroup U5b dominate, between them accounting for about 89% of the total. This gives the Sami regions the highest level of haplogroups V and U5b thus far found. Both haplogroups V and U5b are spread at moderate frequencies across Europe, from Iberia to the Ural Mountains. Haplogroups H, D5 and Z represent most of the remaining averaged total. Overall 98% of the Sami mtDNA pool is encompassed within haplogroups V, U5b, H, Z, and D5. Local frequencies among the Sami vary.

The divergence time for the Sami haplogroup V sequences was estimated by Max Ingman and Ulf Gyllensten at 7600 YBP (years before present), and for U5b1b1 as 5500 YBP amongst Sami and 6600 YBP amongst Sami and Finns. This suggests an arrival in the region soon after the retreat of the glacial ice.

Other research on Sami shows that most of them do not belong to the mtDNA Haplogroup I (not to be confused for the aforementioned paternal Haplogroup I-M170) that is shared by many Finnic peoples.

=== U5b ===
The great majority of Sami belong to U5b even though a small proportion falls into U4. The percentage of total Sami mtDNA samples tested by K. Tambets and her colleagues (published in 2004) which were U5b ranged from 56.8% in Norwegian Sami to 26.5% in Swedish Sami.

In research made by M. Ingman and U. Gyllensten in 2006 a slightly different setting is shown: Norwegian Sami belong to U5b as well as U5b1b1 to 56.8%, Finnish Sami with 40.6%, Northern Sami in Sweden to 35.5% and Southern Sami in Sweden within reindeer herding to 23.9% while Southern Sami in Sweden outside of reindeer herding/other occupation belong to U5b to 16.3% and to U5b1b1 to 12%.

Sami U5b falls into subclade U5b1b1. The Sami U5b1b1 sub-clade is present in many different populations, e.g. 3% or higher frequencies in Karelia, Finland, and Northern-Russia. The Sami U5b1 motif is additionally found in very low frequencies for instance in the Caucasus region, however this is explained as recent migration from Europe. However, 38% of the Sami U5b1b1 mtDNAs have haplotype so far exclusive to the Sami, containing a transition at np 16148.

Alessandro Achilli and colleagues noted that the Sami and the Berbers share U5b1b, which they estimated at 9,000 years old, and argued that this provides evidence for a radiation of the haplogroup from the Franco-Cantabrian refuge area of southwestern Europe.

M. Engman's and U. Gyllensten's study on mtDNA amongst Sami in Scandinavia also reveals that haplogroup H is 15.2% within the Sami traditional group in the south of Sweden, and 34.8% amongst Southern Sami in Sweden, and as high as 44.6% amongst Southern non-traditional Sami in Sweden, but just 2.6% amongst Northern Sami in Sweden, and 2.9 within the Sami group in Finland and amongst Sami in Norway to 4.7%. That result points in the direction that South Sami in Sweden have been more exposed to and/or intermarried the continental European haplogroup H earlier, and much more frequent, than Sami in the north of Sweden, in Finland and in Norway, which can be explained by Scandinavian/Swedish settlers who migrated into Southern Sami areas in Sweden from areas like Mälardalen.

=== V ===
The divergence time for the Sami haplogroup V sequences is estimated by M. Ingman and U. Gyllensten at 7,600 years ago. But there is a difference within the Sami group in Sweden according to their study. North Sami (Sami in the North of Swedish Lapland) belong to haplogroup V with 58.6% and South Sami (Sami in the South of Swedish Lapland) within reindeer herding to 37.0% and South Sami outside reindeer herding/other occupation to 8.7%. That can be compared with Sami in Norway that has a 33.1% belonging to haplogroup V and Sami in Finland to 37.7%. Sami in Finland and South Sami within reeinder herding in Sweden have the same percentage belonging to haplogroup V.

But according to K. Tambets' et al. study is haplogroup V the most frequent haplogroup in the Swedish Sami and is present at significantly lower frequencies in Norwegian and Finnish subpopulations. Note though, that in the study made by K. Tambet's et al., no differentation has been made between Sami in the north and the south of Sweden, which otherwise probably would change the outcome of their study.

Torroni and colleagues have suggested that the spread of haplogroup V in Scandinavia and in eastern Europe is due to its late Pleistocene/early Holocene expansion from a Franco-Cantabrian glacial refugium.

However, subsequent studies found that haplogroup V is also significantly present in eastern Europeans. Furthermore, haplogroup V lineages with HVS-I transitions 16153 and 16298 that are frequent in the Sami population are much more widespread in eastern than in western Europe. So haplogroup V might have reached Fennoscandia via central/eastern Europe. Such a scenario is indirectly supported by the absence, among the Sami, of the pre-V mtDNAs that are characteristic of southwestern Europeans and northwestern Africans.

=== Z ===
Haplogroup Z is found at low frequency in the Sami and Northern Asian populations but is virtually absent in Europe. Several conserved substitutions group the Sami Z lineages with those from Finland and the Volga-Ural region of Russia. The estimated dating of the lineage at 2700 years suggests a small, relatively recent contribution of people from the Volga-Ural region to the Sami population.

Haplogroup Z is most frequent in Northeastern Asia. It is also present in Siberian populations as well as in the region of Volga-Ural, as just mentioned.

Subhaplogroup Z1 is present in lineages in Western Asia and Northern Europe as well as in the Koryak and Itel'men populations. Interestingly enough, haplogroup Z is most frequent amongst maritime Koryaks with just a bit over 10%, but is not at all present in reindeer-herding Koryaks.

The Itel'men and Koryak populations live on the Kamchatka peninsula, the former in the south and the latter in the very north.

== Autosomal DNA ==
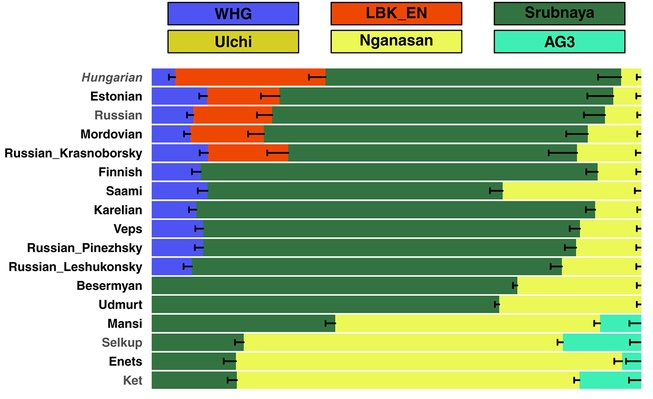
Estimated ancestry components among selected Eurasian populations. The yellow component represents Neo-Siberian ancestry (represented by Nganasans).

Autosomal genetic analyses have found that the Sámi people cluster in a distinct position, shifted away from other Europeans, with a significant proportion of the genome originating from a Neo-Siberian source population, best represented by the Nganasan people. The Sami are up to 30% Eastern Eurasian. The specific Siberian-like ancestry is proposed to have arrived in Northeast Europe during the early Iron Age, linked to the arrival of Uralic languages. The Siberian component is estimated to make up roughly 25%. The Mesolithic "Western European Hunter-Gatherer" (WHG) component is close to 15%, while that of the Neolithic "European early farmer" (LBK) is 10%. About 50% is associated with the Bronze Age "Yamna" component, the earliest trace of which is observed in the Pit–Comb Ware culture in Estonia, but in a 2.5-fold lower percentage.

== See also ==
- Genetic history of Europe
- Y-DNA haplogroups by ethnic groups
