= Demic diffusion =

Demographic concept

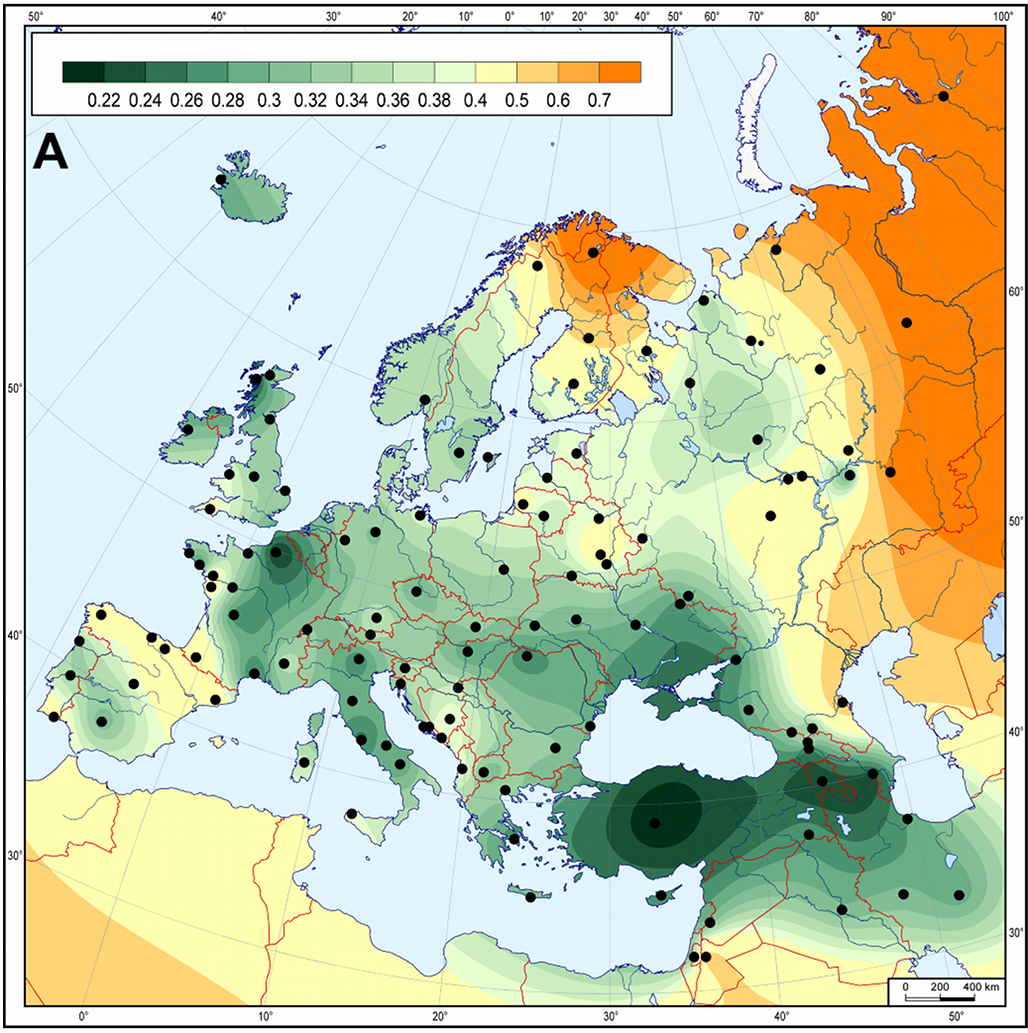
An example of Demic diffusion: ancient European Neolithic farmers were genetically closest to ancient Near-Eastern/Anatolian populations. Genetic matrilineal distances between European Neolithic Linear Pottery Culture populations (5,500–4,900 calibrated BC) and modern Western Eurasian populations: the coloring indicates the degree of similarity of the modern local population(s) with the Neolithic sample set: short distances (greatest similarity) are marked by dark green and long distances (greatest dissimilarity) by orange, with fainter colors in between the extremes. Note that green intervals are scaled by genetic distance values of 0.02, with increasingly larger intervals towards the "orange" end of the scale.

In demography, demic diffusion, as opposed to trans-cultural diffusion, is a model of human migration developed by Luigi Luca Cavalli-Sforza. It originally includes three phases: (1) population growth, prompted by new available resources as in the case of early farmers, and/or other technological developments; (2) a dispersal into regions with lower population density; (3) a limited initial admixture with the people encountered in the process. It may account for displacing, replacing, or intermixing with an existing population, such as has been suggested for the spread of agriculture across Neolithic Europe and several other Landnahme events.

== Evidence ==
Theoretical work by Cavalli-Sforza showed that if admixture between expanding farmers and previously resident groups of hunters and gatherers was not immediate, the process would result in the establishment of broad genetic gradients. Because broad gradients, spanning much of Europe from southeast to northwest, were identified in empirical genetic studies by Cavalli-Sforza, Robert R. Sokal, Guido Barbujani, Lounès Chikhi and others, it seemed likely that the spread of agriculture into Europe occurred by the expansion and the spread of agriculturists, who possibly originated in the Fertile Crescent of the Near East. That is referred to as the Neolithic demic diffusion model.

Craniometric and archaeological studies have also arrived at the same conclusion.
