= Parfenyevo, Parfenyevsky District, Kostroma Oblast =

Rural locality in Kostroma Oblast, Russia

Coordinates: 58°28′46″N 43°24′28″E

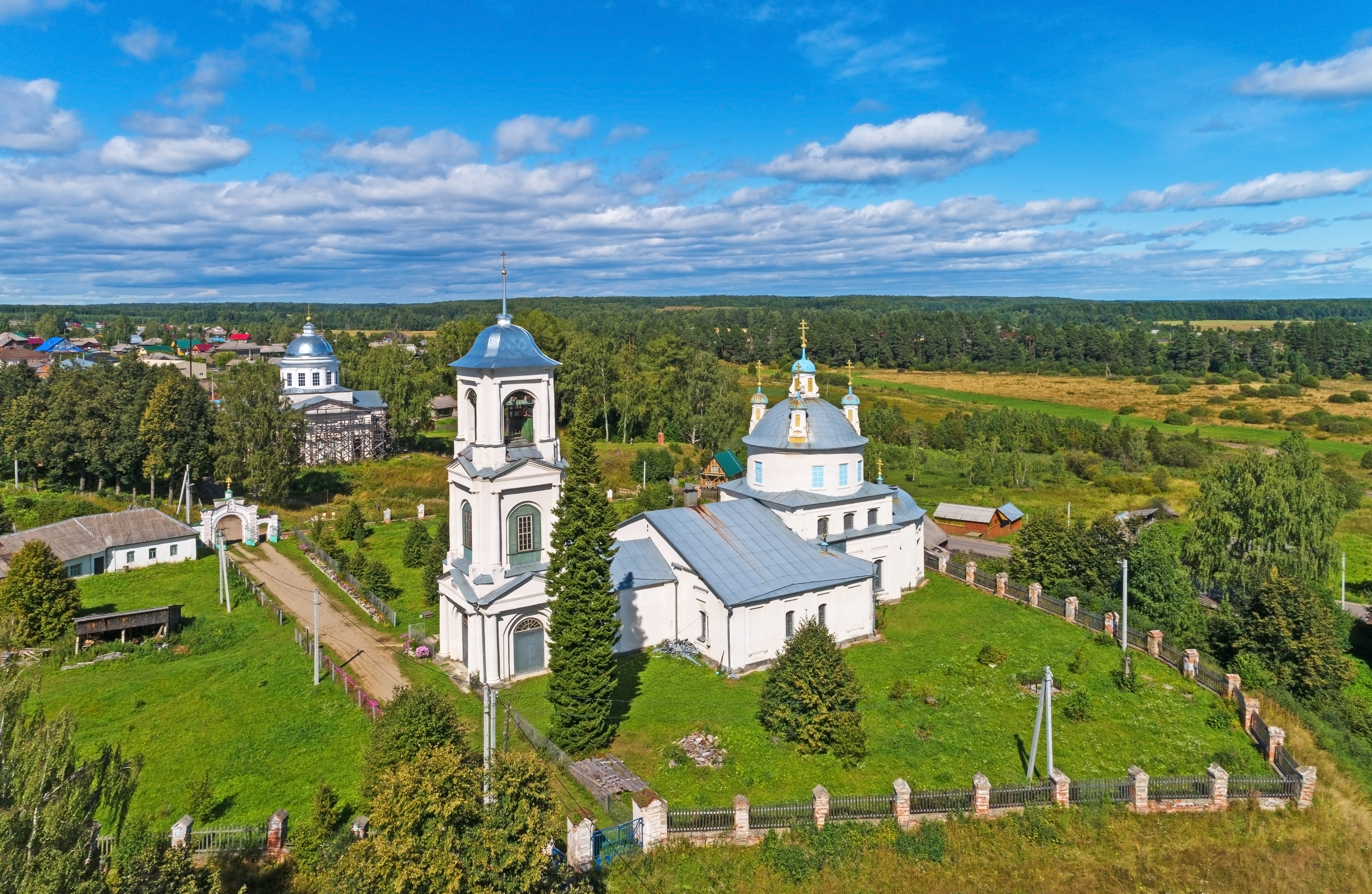
A picture of the church in Parenyevo

Parfenyevo (Russian: Парфе́ньево) is a rural locality (a selo) and the administrative center of Parfenyevsky District, Kostroma Oblast, Russia. Population: 2,870 (2010 census); 2,936 (2002 census); 3,032 (1989 Soviet census).
