= Lounès Chikhi =

French population geneticist

Lounès Chikhi (born Paris, France) is a French population geneticist of Algerian Berber extraction, based at the Université Paul Sabatier in Toulouse, France, and also at the Instituto Gulbenkian de Ciência in Oeiras, Portugal, where he runs the Population and Conservation Genetics Group.

== Scientific career ==
Chikhi is notable for leading a number of population genetics studies on the origins and demographic history of various of human populations – including Europeans and the peoples of Japan – and on the conservation genetics of various primate species. He has published a number of influential scientific papers in defense of model-based inference of population history and raising concerns about incautious used of interpretative phylogeography in making inferences on human population demographic history. He is also involved in conservation projects in northern Borneo and Madagascar, among others.

== Selected Scientific Bibliography ==
- Beaumont M, Nielsen R, Robert C, Hey J, Gaggiotti O, Knowles L, Estoup A, Panchal M, Corander J, Hickerson M, Sisson SA, Fagundes N, Chikhi L, Beerli P, Vitalis R, Cornuet JM, Huelsenbeck J, Foll M, Yang, Rousset F, Balding D, Excoffier L (2010) In defense of model-based inference in phylogeography. Molecular Ecology, 19 (3), 436-446.
- Quéméré, E, Champeau J, Besolo, A, Rasolondraibe, E Rabarivola, C, Crouau-Roy, B Chikhi, L (2010) Spatial variation in density and total size estimates in fragmented primate populations: the golden-crowned sifaka (Propithecus tattersalli). American Journal of Primatology, 72, 72-80.
- Chikhi L (2009) Genetic data and story-telling: from Archeogenetics to Astrologenetics? An update to “Clinal variation in the nuclear DNA of Europeans” By Chikhi, L., Destro-Bisol, G., Pascali, V., Baravelli V., Dobosz, M., Barbujani, G. Published in 1998 in Human Biology. Human Biology, 81, (5-6), 639-643.
- Rasteiro, R., Chikhi, L. (2009). Revisiting the peopling of Japan: an admixture perspective. Journal of Human Genetics, 54,349-354.
- Parreira, B., Trussart, M., Sousa, V., Hudson, R., Chikhi, L., (2009). SPAms : A user-friendly software to simulate population genetics data under complex demographic models. Molecular Ecology Resources. 9 : 749-753.
- Sousa, V., Fritz, M., Beaumont, M.A., Chikhi, L. (2009) Approximate Bayesian Computation without summary statistics: the case of admixture. Genetics, 181, 187-197.
- Chikhi, L. (2008). News and Commentary: How accurate can genetic data be? Heredity 101 :471-472
- Chikhi, L., (2008). Nos ancêtres dans nos gènes. La Recherche, 37, 77-81.
- Radespiel, U, Rakotondravony, R, Chikhi, L (2008). Natural and anthropogenic determinants of genetic structure in the largest remaining metapopulation of the endangered golden-brown mouse lemur, Microcebus ravelobensis American Journal of Primatology 70 :1-11
- Barbujani G., Chikhi, L. (2007). Human genetic diversity and its history In Handbook of Statistical Genetics, eds D. Balding, M. Bishop, and C. Cannings, 3rd edition.
- Goossens, B.*., Chikhi, L.*., Ancrenaz, M., Lackman-Ancrenaz, I., Andau, M., Bruford, M.W. (2006). Genetic signature of anthropogenic population collapse in orang-utans PLoS, Biology, 4(2) :285-291. *Shared first authorship.
- Chikhi, L. Beaumont, M.. (2005). Modelling Human Genetic History Encyclopaedia of Genetics, Genomics, Proteomics & Bioinformatics.
- Chikhi, L., Bruford, M.W. (2005). Mammalian population genetics and genomics Mammalian Genomics (ed. Ruvinsky A, Marshall Graves J). CABI Publisher 21 :539-583.
- Chikhi, L., Nichols, R.A., Barbujani G., Beaumont M.A. (2002). Y genetic data support the Demic diffusion model. Proc. Natl. Acad. Sci, USA 98 :11007-11013.
- Goldstein, D.B., Chikhi, L. (2002). Human migrations and population structure : what we know and why it matters Annual Review of Genomics and Human Genetics 3 :129-152.
