= Guido Barbujani =

Italian population geneticist, evolutionist and literary author (born 1955)

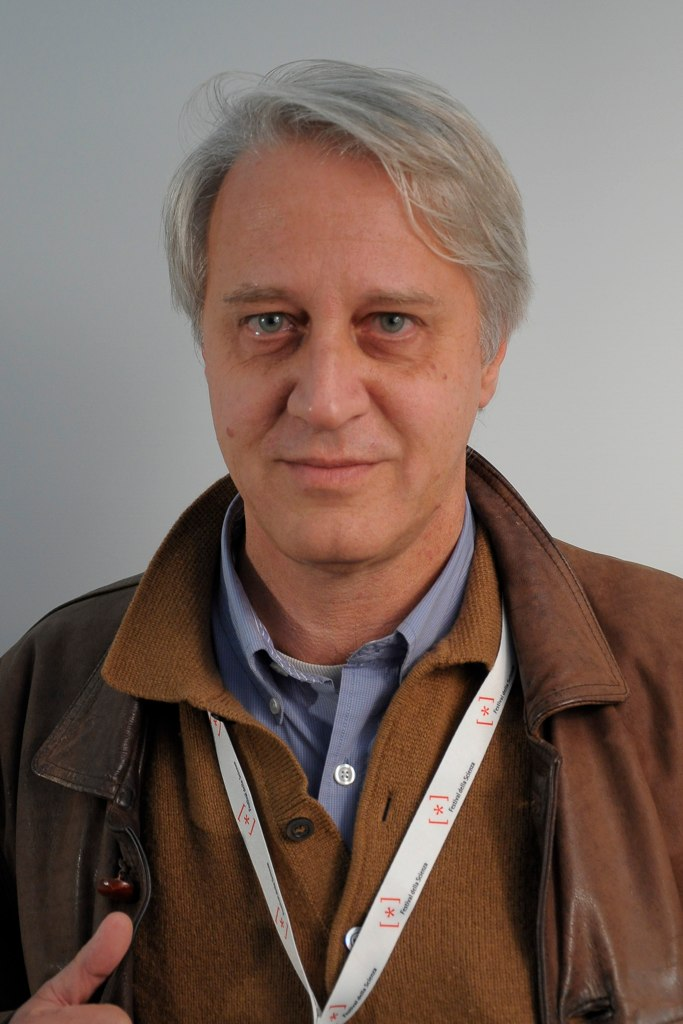
- Born: 31 January 1955 (age 71); Adria, Italy
- Education: University of Ferrara
- Known for: Contributions to Population genetics
- Scientific career
- Fields: Genetics, Evolutionary Biology
- Workplaces: State University of New York, Stony Brook; University of Ferrara

Guido Barbujani (born 31 January 1955) is an Italian population geneticist, evolutionary biologist and literary author born in Adria, who has worked with the State University of New York at Stony Brook (NY), University of Padua, and University of Bologna. He has taught at the University of Ferrara since 1996.

== Works ==
A population geneticist by training, Barbujani has been working on several aspects of human genetic variation. In collaboration with Robert R. Sokal, he pioneered the statistical comparison of patterns of genetic and linguistic variation, showing that language differences may contribute to reproductive isolation, and hence promote genetic divergence between populations.

His analyses of geographic patterns of genetic variation in Europe support Luca Cavalli-Sforza's Neolithic demic diffusion model, or the idea that farming spread in the Neolithic mainly because farmers did, and not by cultural transmission. There are two implications of this finding: first, that most Europeans' ancestors, up to Neolithic times, did not live in geographical Europe, but rather in the Near East; and second, that the early farmers expanding west carried with them their genes, their technologies, and possibly their languages.

His studies of the amount of DNA differentiation among human populations, and of its spatial distribution, led to the conclusion that traditional human racial classifications fail to account for most of the existing patterns of genetic variation. Rather, it seems that genetic variation is largely uncorrelated across genes, which, if confirmed, would explain why no consensus was ever reached on a catalog of human biological races. This activity has also resulted in publications for the general public.

His recent DNA studies focus on genetic characterization of ancient human populations, such as Paleolithic anatomically modern humans of Cro-Magnoid morphology, and groups like the Etruscans and the Sardinians from the Nuragic era in the Neolithic.

Barbujani is the author of three novels.

== Quote ==
- "The idea that all humans naturally belong to one of a few biological types or races that evolved in isolation was unchallenged for centuries, but large-scale modern studies failed to associate racial labels with recognizable genetic clusters." (Barbujani G., 2005, p. 215)

== Scientific Bibliography ==
- Barbujani G. and Sokal R.R. (1990) Zones of sharp genetic change in Europe are also linguistic boundaries. Proceedings of the National Academy of Sciences USA 87:1816-1819.
- Barbujani G., Magagni A., Minch E. and Cavalli-Sforza L.L. (1997) An apportionment of human DNA diversity. Proceedings of the National Academy of Sciences USA 94:4516-4519.
- Barbujani G. and Bertorelle G. (2001) Genetics and the population history of Europe. Proceedings of the National Academy of Sciences USA 98:22-25.
- Chikhi L., Destro-Bisol G., Bertorelle G., Pascali V., and Barbujani G. (1998) Clines of nuclear DNA markers suggest a recent, Neolithic ancestry of the European gene pool. Proceedings of the National Academy of Sciences USA, 95:9053-9058.
- Romualdi C., Balding D., Nasidze I.S., Risch G., Robichaux M., Sherry S., Stoneking M., Batzer M. and Barbujani G. (2002) Patterns of human diversity, within and among continents, inferred from biallelic DNA polymorphisms. Genome Research 12:602-612.
- Barbujani G. and Goldstein D.B. (2004) Africans and Asians abroad: Genetic diversity in Europe. Annual Review of Genomics and Human Genetics 5:119-150.
- Dupanloup I., Bertorelle G., Chikhi L. and Barbujani G. (2004) Estimating the impact of prehistoric admixture on the Europeans’ genome. Molecular Biology and Evolution 21:1361-1372
- Barbujani G. (2005) Human races: Classifying people vs. understanding diversity. Current Genomics 6:215-226
- Belle E.M.S., Ramakrishnan U., Mountain J. and Barbujani G. (2006) Serial coalescent simulations suggest a weak genealogical relationship between Etruscans and modern Tuscans. Proceedings of the National Academy of Sciences USA 103:8012-8017.
- Caramelli D., Milani L., Vai S., Modi A., Pecchioli E., Girardi M., Pilli E., Lari M., Lippi B., Ronchitelli A., Mallegni F., Casoli A., Bertorelle G., Barbujani G. (2008) A 28,000 years old Cro–Magnon mtDNA sequence differs from all potentially contaminating modern sequences. PLoS ONE 3:e2700.
- Ghirotto S., Mona S., Benazzo A., Paparazzo F., Caramelli D., Barbujani G. (2010) Inferring genealogical processes from patterns of Bronze–age and modern DNA variation in Sardinia. Molecular Biology and Evolution 27:775–786.
- Barbujani G. and Colonna V. (2010) Human genome diversity: Frequently asked questions. Trends in Genetics 26:285–295.

== Bibliography (Books, Nonfiction) ==
- Dopoguerra. Editorial Sironi. 2002. 144 pages. ISBN 9788851800000.
- Dilettanti. Editorial Sironi. 2004. 160 pages. ISBN 9788831758918.
- L' invenzione delle razze. Capire la biodiversità umana. Bompiani Editorial. 2006. 177 pages. ISBN 9788845257452.
- Barbujani, Guido; Cheli, P. (2008). Sono razzista, ma sto cercando di smettere. Rome-Bari: Laterza.
- Questione di razza. Editorial Mondadori. 2008. 192 pages. ISBN 9788828213017.
- Sono razzista, ma sto cercando di smettere. Laterza Editorial. 2010. 128 pages. ISBN 9788858147429.
- Morti e sepolti. Bompiani Editorial. 2010. 224 pages. ISBN 9788845266249.
- Lascia stare i santi. Una storia di reliquie e di scienziati. Bompiani Editorial. 2016. 224 pages. ISBN 9788806216818.
- Gli africani siamo noi. Alle origini dell'uomo. Laterza Edito. 2016. 137 pages. ISBN 8858130995.
- Il giro del mondo in sei milioni di anni (con Andrea Brunelli). Il Mulino Editorial. 2018. 176 pages. ISBN 9788815274205.
- Tutto il resto è provvisorio. Bompiani Editorial. 2018. 224 pages. ISBN 9788845297045.
- Sillabario di genetica per principianti. Bompiani Editorial. 2019. 272 pages. ISBN 9788830106093.
- Soggetti smarriti. Bompiani Editorial. 2020. 192 pages. ISBN 9788806252304.
- Europei senza se e senza ma. Storie di Neandertaliani e di immigrati. Bompiani Editorial. 2021. 318 pages. ISBN 8830103934.
- Come eravamo. Storie dalla grande storia dell'uomo. Laterza Editorial. 2022. 208 pages. ISBN 9788858154762.
- L'alba della storia. Una rivoluzione iniziata diecimila anni fa. Laterza Editorial. 2024. 208 pages. ISBN 9788858155141.

== Bibliography (Books, Fiction) ==
- Dilettanti. Marsilio, Venice, 1994 (Republished as: Dilettanti. Quattro viaggi nei dintorni di Charles Darwin. Sironi, Milan, 2004)
- Dopoguerra. Sironi, Milan, 2002.
- Questione di razza. Mondadori, Milan, 2003.
