= Neya (river) =

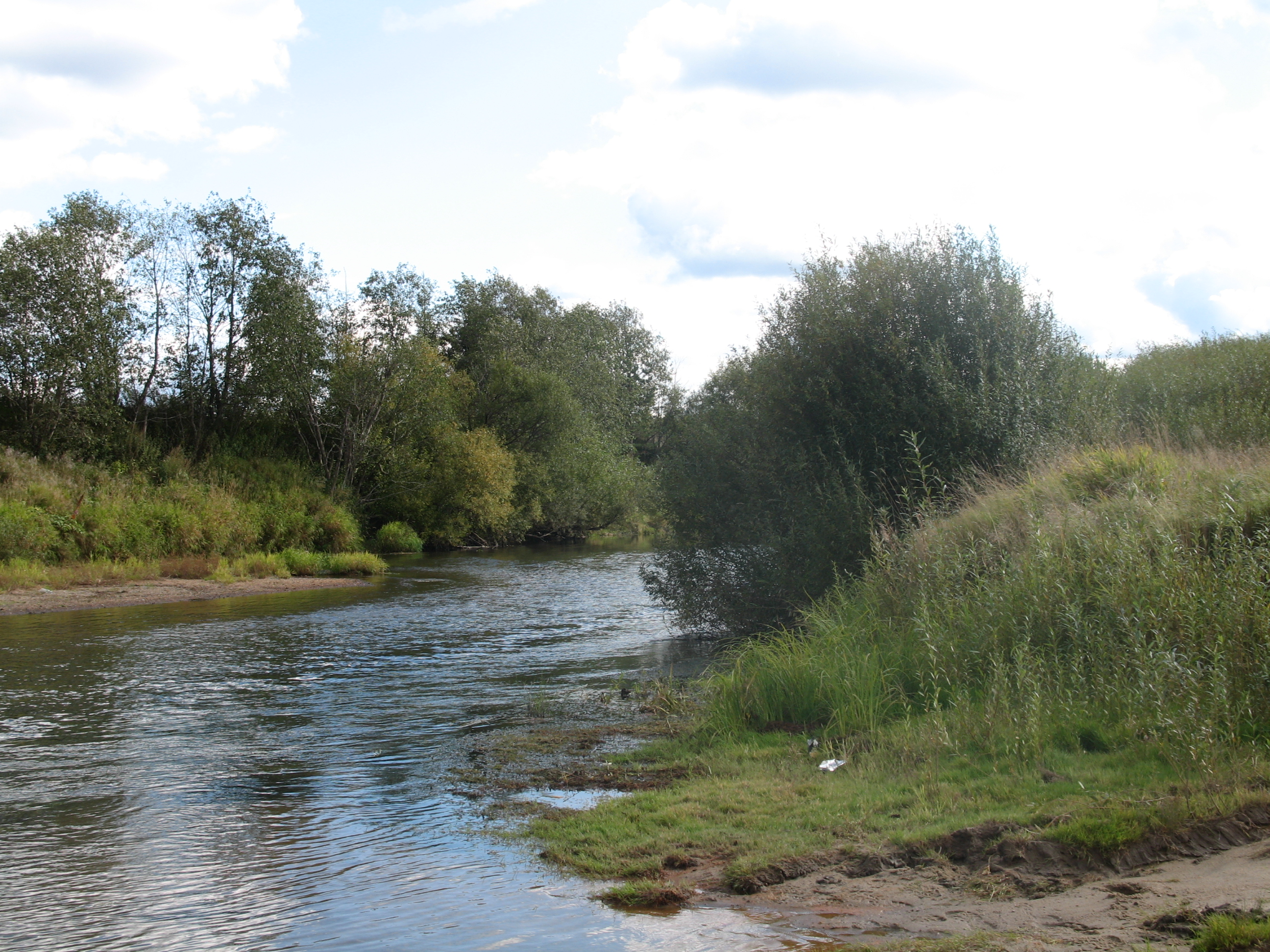
- The Neya near the village of Parfenyevo
- Native name: Нея (Russian)

Location
- Country: Russia

Physical characteristics
- Mouth: Unzha
  - coordinates: 57.8000°N 43.7125°E
- Length: 253 km (157 mi)
- Basin size: 6,060 km^{2} (2,340 sq mi)

Basin features
- Progression: Unzha→ Volga→ Caspian Sea

The Neya (Russian: Не́я) is a river in Kostroma Oblast, Russia. It is a tributary of the Unzha (in Volga's drainage basin). It is 253 kilometers (157 mi) long, with a drainage basin of 6,060 square kilometers (2,340 sq mi).

The town of Neya is situated by the river Neya.
