= Genetic studies on Russians =

DNA analysis of Russian populations

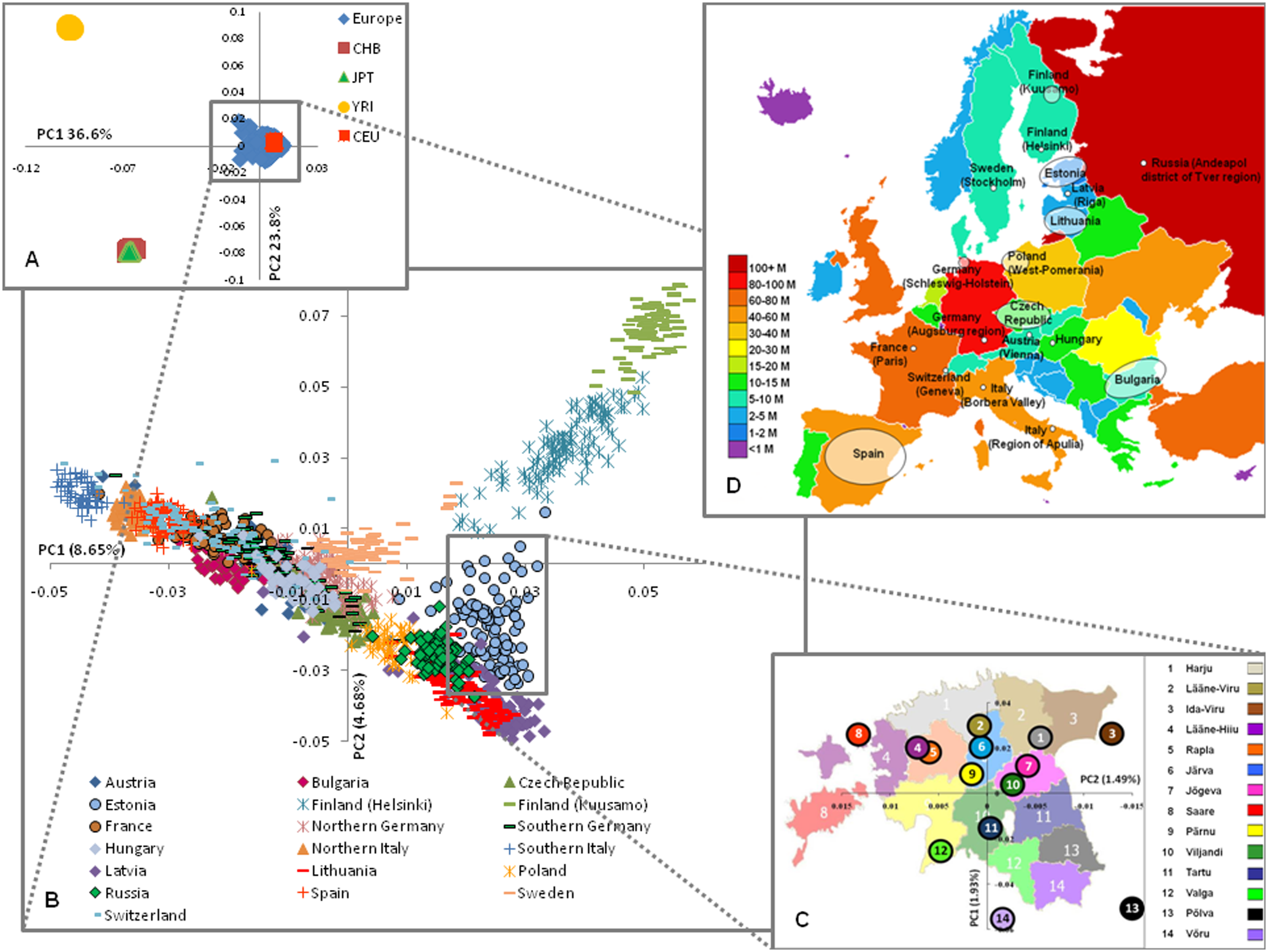
European genetic structure (based on SNPs) PC analysis

Genetic studies show that Russians are overall closely related to other Eastern European and North European populations, such as Belarusians, Ukrainians, Poles, as well as Estonians, Finns, Lithuanians, Latvians and Swedes, and display significant genetic heterogenity, evidence for multiple genetic ancestries and admixture events. Northern and Northeastern Russians are genetically close to surrounding Finno-Ugric speaking peoples.

== Y-DNA chromosomes ==
The most common Y-DNA haplogroups among Russians (n=1228) are:

- Haplogroup R1a – with an average of 46.7%
- Haplogroup N – with an average of 21.6%
- Haplogroup I – with an average of 17.6%
- Haplogroup R1b – with an average of 5.8%
- 8.3% others

Haplogroup R1a has been associated with Balto-Slavic speakers and makes up roughly half of all Y-DNA chromosomes, except in Northern Russia, where it declines to 20–30%. Haplogroup R1b is found in a mosaic pattern, and generally in low frequencies. Haplogroup N (N3 and N2) has been associated with Altaic and Uralic speakers, N3 decreases from North (>35%) to South (<10%), while N2 is present among Northern Russians (3–14%), but absent elsewhere. Haplogroup I2a (Dinaric) decreases from South (~15%) to North (~5%) and follows an "out-of-Balkan" trend, while I1b is commonly found in Scandinavia and correlates "with ancient routes from Scandinavia to the Volga Basin" among Russians. Other haplogroups, such as E3b and J2 "exhibit spotty frequencies in Russians".

== mtDNA chromosomes ==
The mitochondrial gene pool of Russians are represented by mtDNA types belonging to typical West Eurasian groups. East Eurasian admixture was shown to be minimal and existed in low frequencies in the form of Haplogroup M. The same studies indicate Eurasian haplogroups present at a frequency of 97.8% and 98.5% among a sample of 325 and 201 Russians respectively.

== Autosomal DNA ==
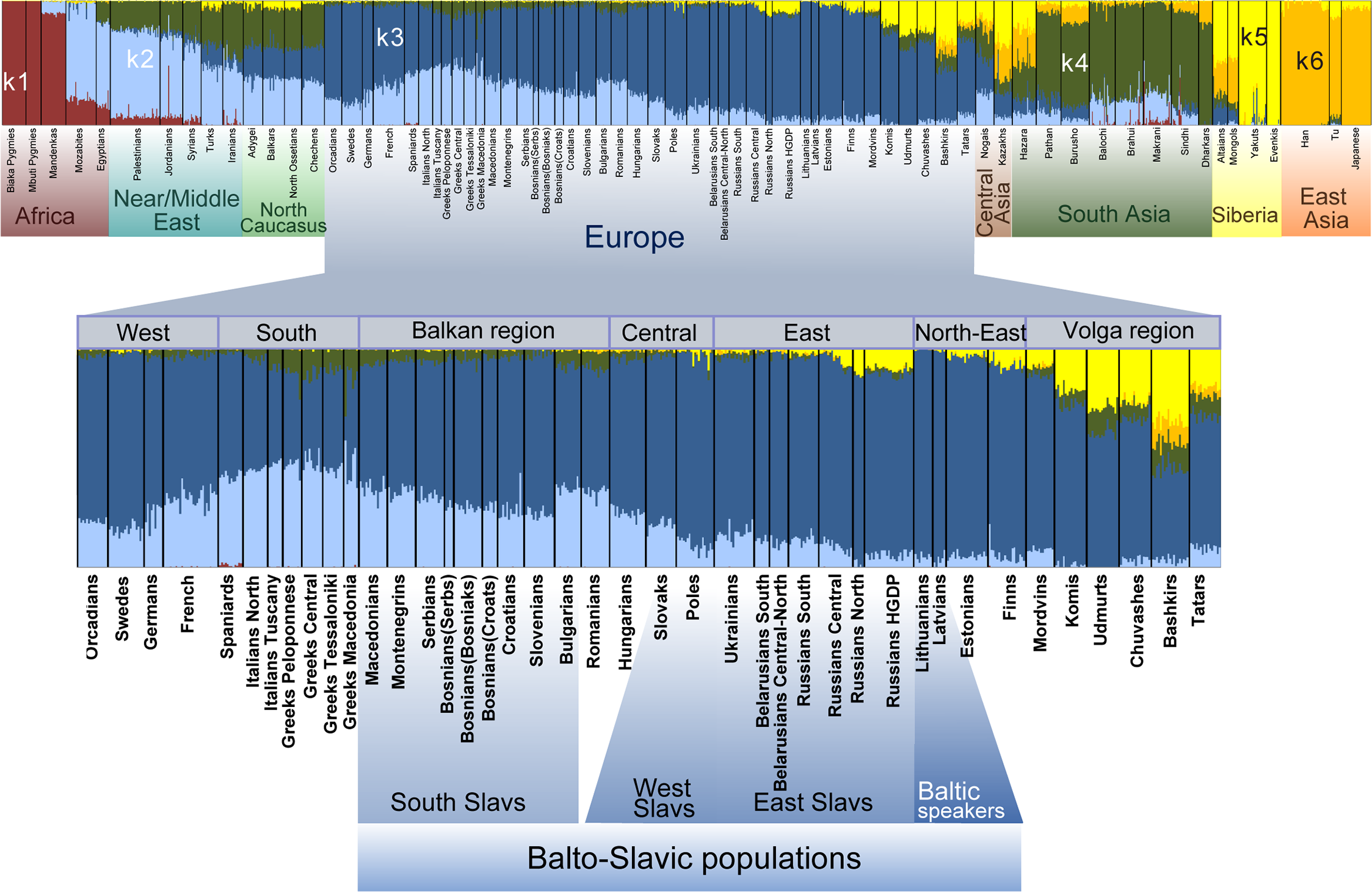
Ancestry proportions of 1,194 individuals as revealed by ADMIXTURE.

Autosomally, European Russians can be subdivided into at least two groups: central–southern and northern Russians. Russians from Tver, Murom, and Kursk (Central Russia) were found to be more similar to populations from central-eastern Europe, especially other Eastern Slavs, but distinct from Russians in the Mezen and the Arkhangelsk region (Russian North), who display high identity-by-descent sharing with the Finnic peoples.

While modern European populations derive most of their ancestry from three major sources: Western hunter-gatherers, Early European Farmers, and Western Steppe Herders (Yamnaya), this three-way model is insufficient to explain the ethnogenesis of populations from north-eastern Europe such as Russians, Estonians, Finns, Mordovians, Komi, Saami, Udmurts and Mari. Russians carry an additional Nganasan-related genetic component and increased allele sharing with modern East Asians. The Yamnaya-like contribution is estimated at around 50%, the Neolithic Farmers contribution at around 26%, the WHG contribution at around 12%, and the Siberian/Nganasan-like contribution at around 11%. A study by Wang et al. argued that the levels of "Siberian" ancestry among Europeans may be linked to the diffusion of paternal haplogroup N-M231.

Another QpAdm run by Peltola et al. 2023 estimated each 42%, 47%, and 46% Yamnaya-like contributions; 28%, 33%, and 36% Neolithic Farmers contributions; 16%, 13%, and 14% WHG-like contributions; and 14%, 7%, and 4% Siberian/Nganasan-like contributions for Northern, Central, and Southern Russians respectively. In this regard, Northern Russians are roughly comparable to Finns, Central Russians to Estonians, and Southern Russians to other Slavic populations such as Belarusians and Ukrainians.

=== Historical context ===
Slavic tribes in the 7th to 9th century

Historical Russians formed primarily from early Slavic peoples, who came into contact with Uralic-speaking groups. Subsequently historical Russians expanded further eastwards, coming into contact with various other groups of Central Asia and Siberia. Later geneflow between minority groups and Russians contributed to the genetic diversity across Russia.

== See also ==
- Demographics of Russia
- Genetic history of Europe
