= Origin hypotheses of the Serbs =

The Serbs trace their history to the 6th- and 7th-century Slavic migrations to the Balkans. Settling in various parts of the Balkans, Early Slavs assimilated local Byzantine populations (primarily descendants of different paleo-Balkan peoples) and other former Roman citizens. Their descendants later coalesced into different Balkan Slavic medieval states.

== Early historical records of the Serb name ==
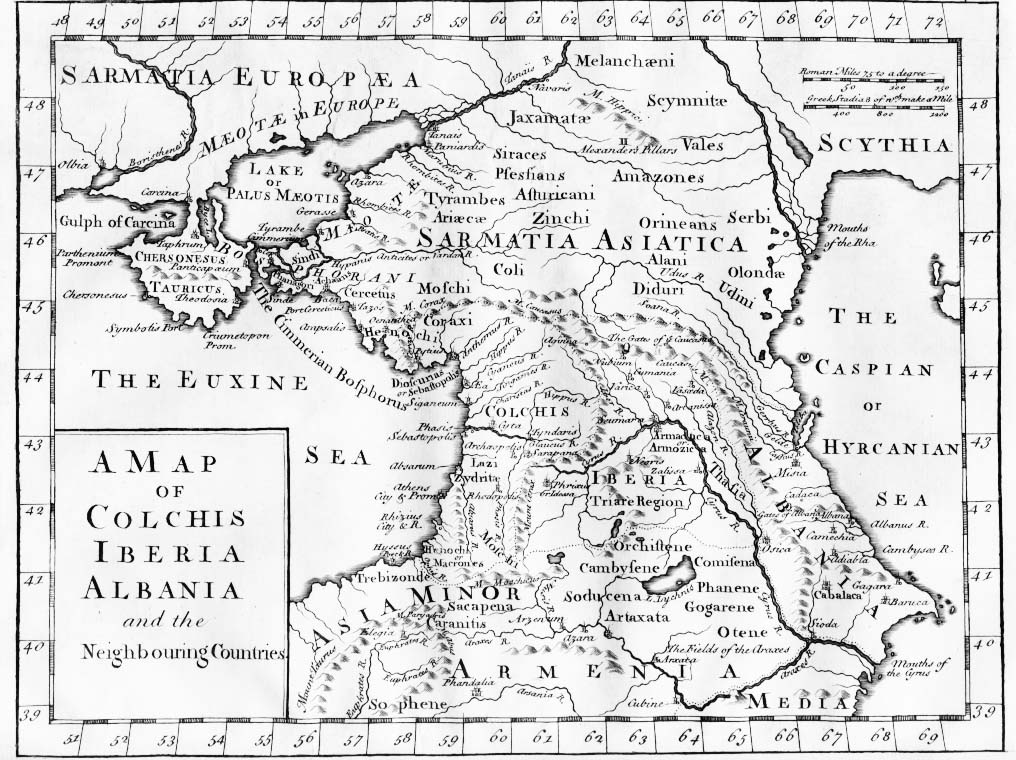
"Serbi" located near the mouth of the Volga, based on Greek literary sources, in a map printed in LONDON, ca 1770

Various historical authors mentioned names of the Serbs (Serbian: Srbi) and Sorbs (Upper Sorbian: Serbja; Lower Sorbian: Serby) in different variants: as Cervetiis (Servetiis), gentis (S)urbiorum, Suurbi, Sorabi, Soraborum, Sorabos, Surpe, Sorabici, Sorabiet, Sarbin, Swrbjn, Servians, Sorbi, Sirbia, Sribia, Zirbia, Zribia, Suurbelant, Surbia, Serbulia / Sorbulia among others. These authors used these names to refer to Serbs and Sorbs in areas where their historical (or current) presence was/is not disputed (notably in the Balkans and Lusatia), but there are also sources that mention the same or similar names in other parts of the World (most notably in the Asiatic Sarmatia in the Caucasus). Attempts of various researchers to connect these names with modern Serbs produced various theories about the origin of the Serb people.

Early historical mentions of an alleged "Serb" ethnonym in the Caucasus

- Pliny the Younger in his work Plinii Caecilii Secundi Historia naturalis from the first century AD (69–75) mentioned people named the Serboi, who lived near the Cimmerians, presumably on the Black Sea and the Sea of Azov.
- In the 2nd century (around 175 AD), the Egyptian Greek scientist Claudius Ptolemy mentioned in his Geography people named Serboi or Sirboi, who presumably lived behind the Caucasus, in the hinterland of the Caspian Sea.

Early historical mentions of other Serb-sounding names that some researchers are trying to connect with the Serb people

- In the same book where he mentioned people named the Serboi, Claudius Ptolemy also mentioned a city named Serbinum in Pannonia.
- Ancient geographer Strabo mentioned that the river Xanthos in Lycia was formerly named Sirbis.
- In the 10th century, Byzantine emperor Constantine VII Porphyrogennetos (912-959) mentioned in his book De Ceremoniis, apart from the Slavic Croats and Serbs, there were two tribes named the Krevatades (Krevatas) and the Saṛbanī, which some researches identified as the Croats and Serbs. These tribes were located in the Caucasus near the river Terek, between Alania and Tsanaria. The Saṛbanī tribe in the Caucasus in the 10th century was also recorded by an Arab geographer.
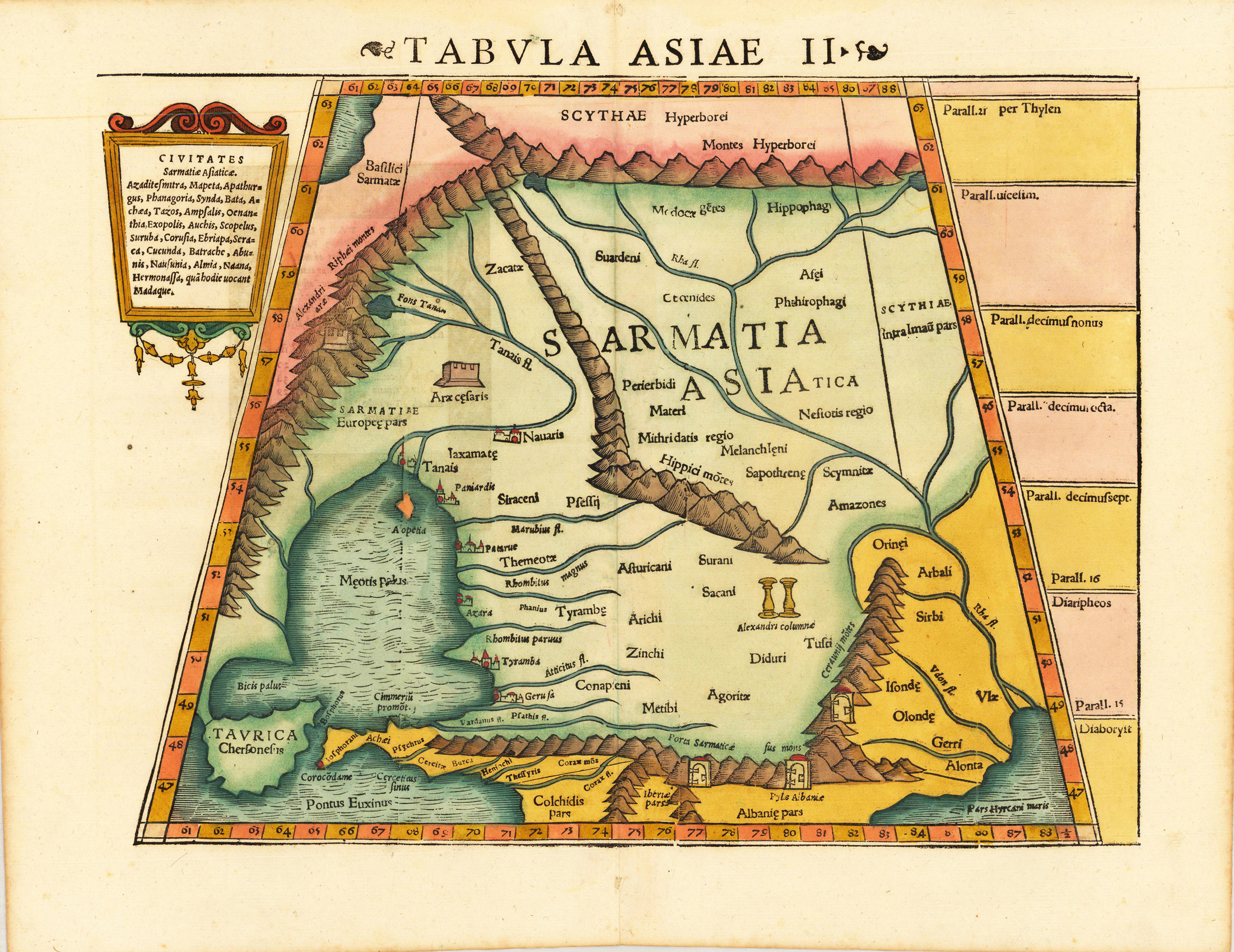
People with name Sirbi near the estuary of the river Volga, on Ptolemaic map from 1552.

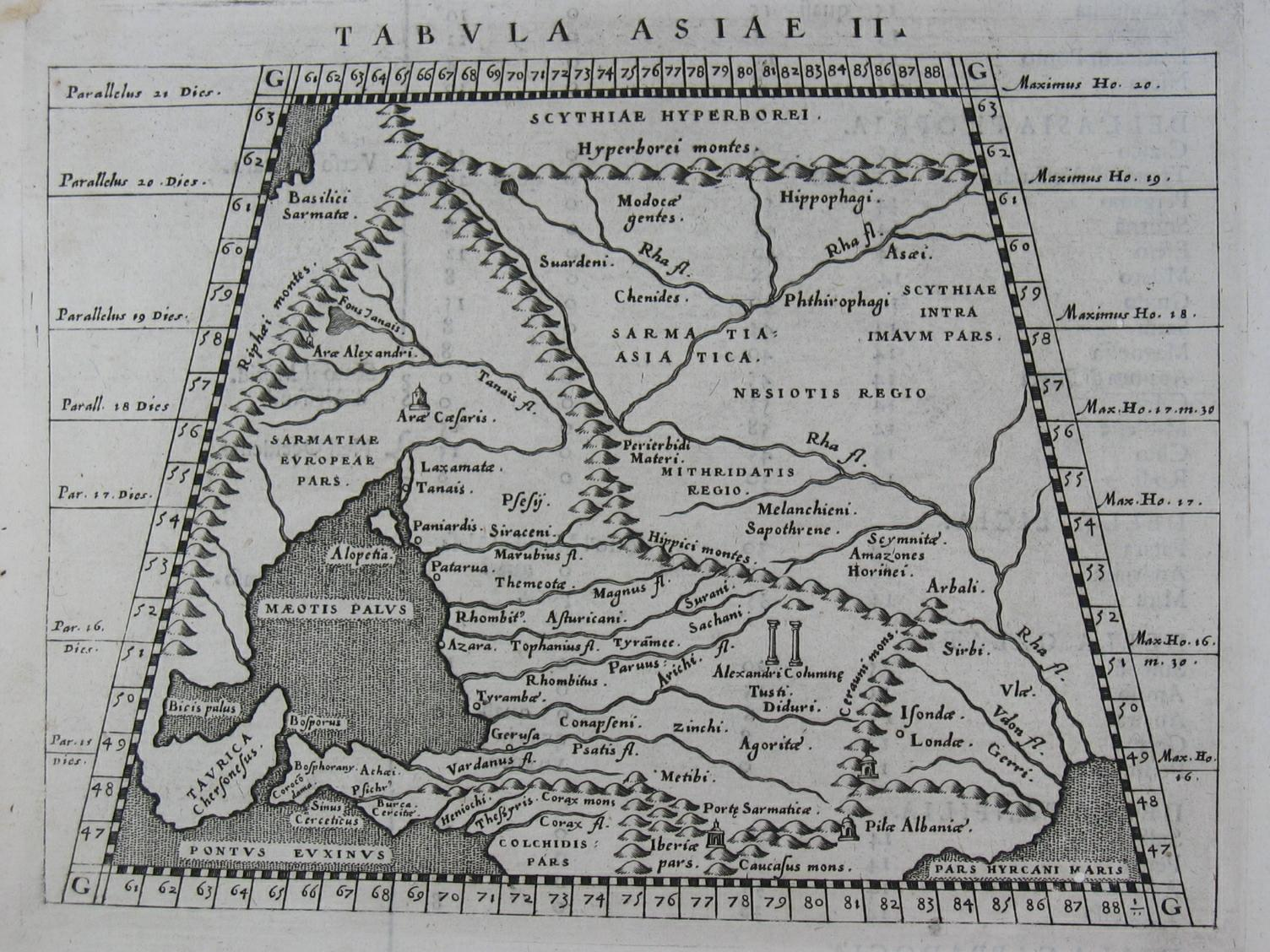
People with name Sirbi near the estuary of the river Volga, on Ptolemaic map from 1598.

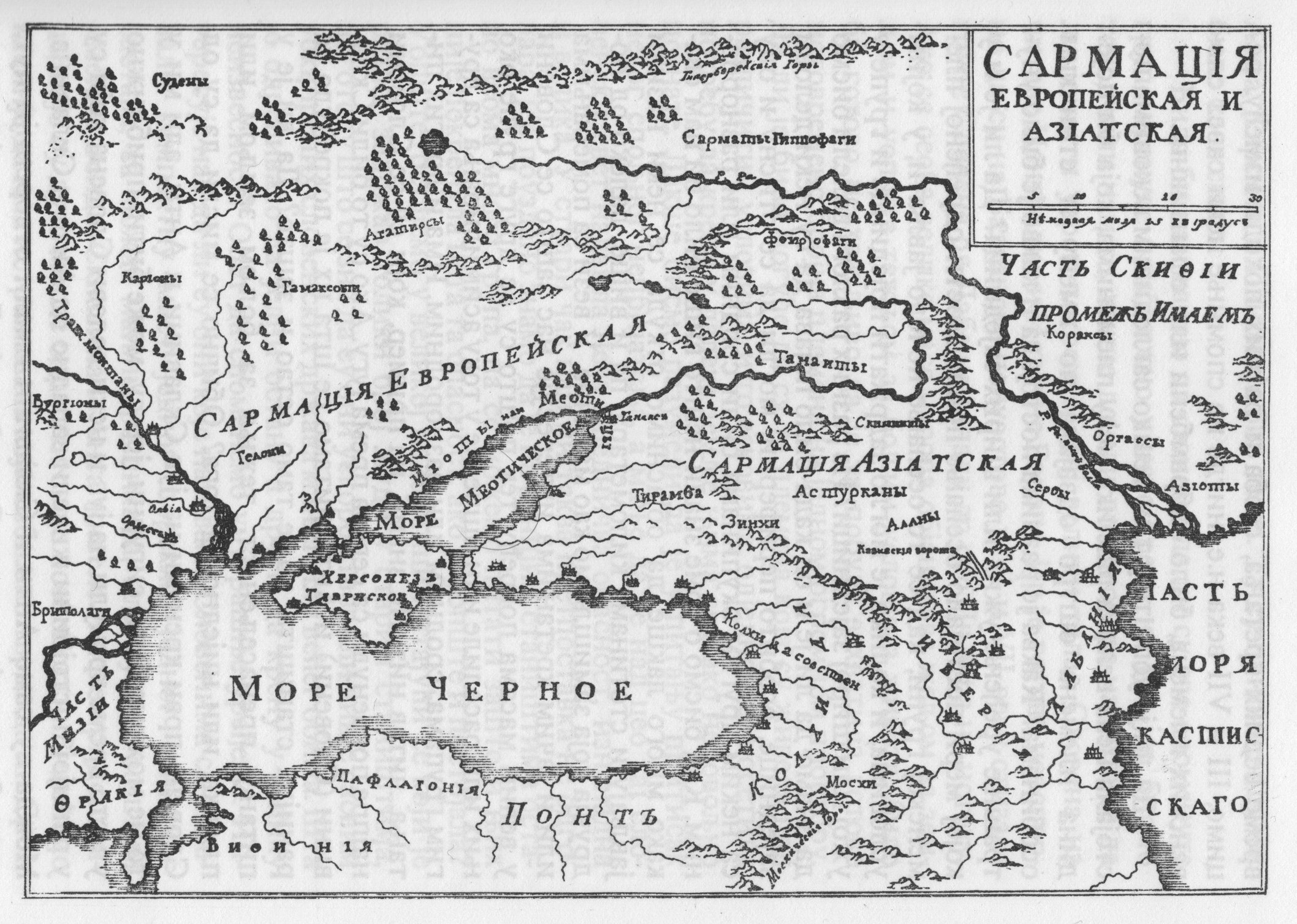
People with name Serbi (Серби) near the estuary of the river Volga, according to the map from the book of Jovan Rajić, printed in Vienna in 1794.

== Migration of White Serbs to the Balkans ==
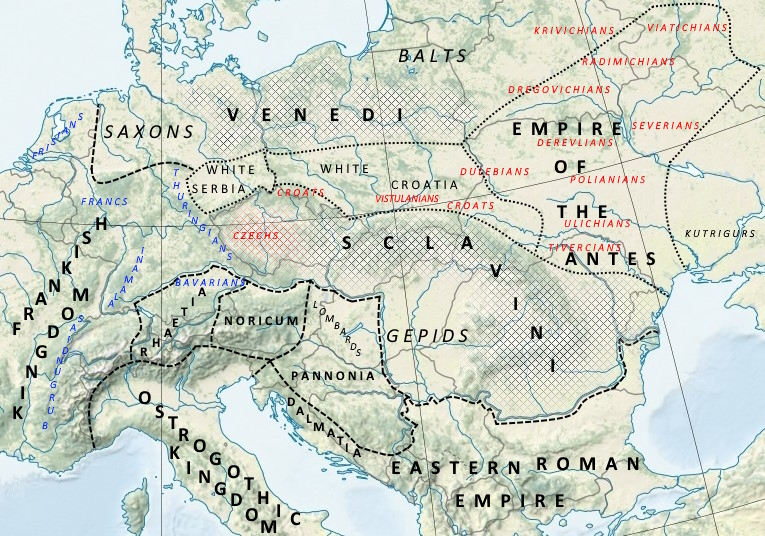
Location of White Serbia c. 560 AD, according to Francis Dvornik (1949–1956)

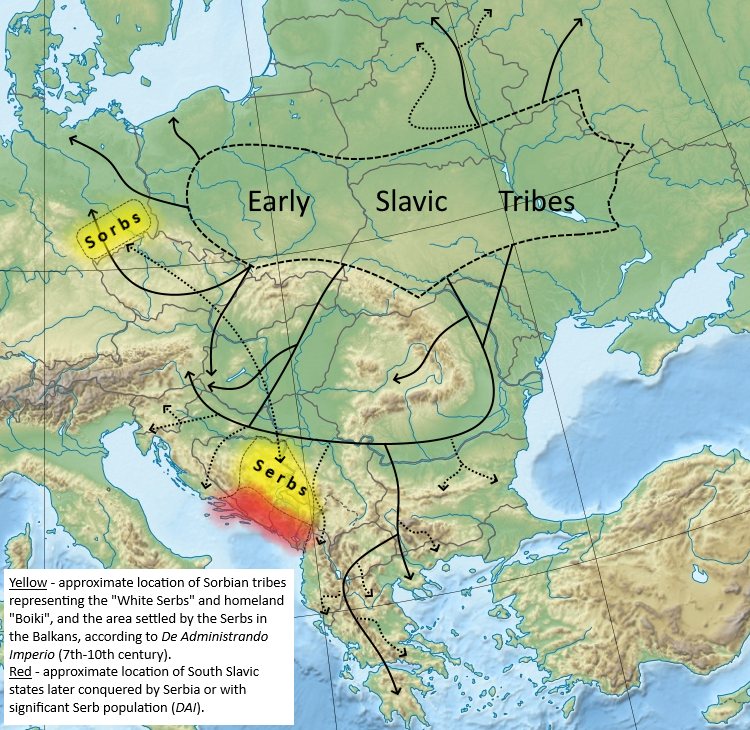
Slavic and Serbian migrations to the Balkans

According to De Administrando Imperio (DAI), written by the Byzantine emperor Constantine VII (912–959), the Serbs originated from the "White Serbs" who lived on the "other side of Turkey" (name used for Hungary), in the area that they called "Boiki" (Bohemia). White Serbia bordered the Franks and White Croatia. DAI claims that after two brothers inherited their crown from their father, and that one of them took half of the people, and migrated to the Byzantine Empire (i.e. to the Balkans), during the reign of Emperor Heraclius (610–641). According to German historian Ludwig Albrecht Gebhardi, the two brothers were sons of Dervan, the dux (duke) of the Surbi (Sorbs). Another part of the White Serbs did not migrate southwards, but remained in the Elbe region. Descendants of these White Serbs with still preserved ethnic identity are the present day Lusatian Serbs (Sorbs), who still live in the Lusatia (Lužica, Lausitz) region of eastern Germany.

Contrary to the general consideration in science, there are also opinions that the data from De administrando imperio that describes Serb migration to the Balkans is not correct and that the Serbs came to the Balkans from Eastern Europe, together with other South Slavs.

In the Balkans, Serbs settled first an area near Thessaloniki and then area around rivers Tara, Ibar, Drina and Lim (in the present-day border region of Serbia, Montenegro and Bosnia and Herzegovina), and joined with surrounding South Slavic tribes that came to the Balkans earlier (in the 6th century), as well as the Byzantine population consisting from different people and tribes. Over time, the South Slavs mixed with the Serbs and adopted the Serb name as their own.

Emperor Constantine III (641) transferred a part of the Slavs from the Balkans (Vardar region) to Asia Minor. There these migrants founded the city of Gordoservon, the name of which gives grounds for supposing that among its founders there were Serbs, and was also known under the names of Gordoserbon and Servochoria.

== Theories ==
=== Iranian theory ===
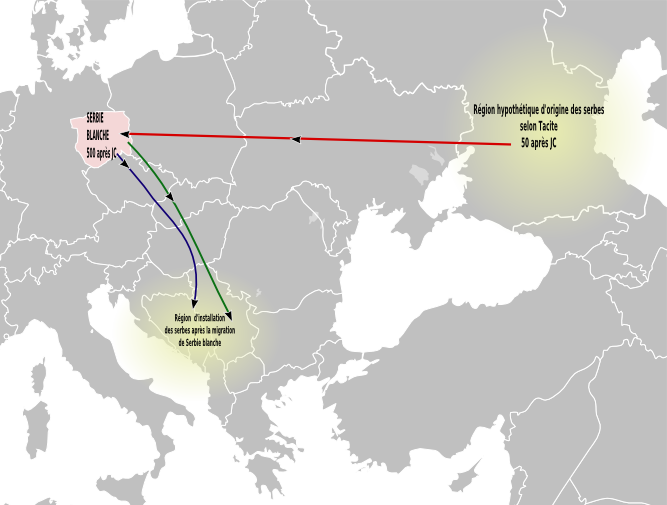
Hypothetical Serb migration from Sarmatia

Theory about Iranian origin of the Serb ethnonym assumes that ancient Serbi / Serboi from north Caucasus (Asiatic Sarmatia) were a Sarmatian (Alanian) tribe. The theory subsequently assumes that Alanian Serbi were subdued by the Huns in the 4th century and that they, as part of the Hunnic army, migrated to the western edge of the Hunnic Empire (in the area of Central Europe near the river Elbe, later designated as White Serbia in what is now Saxony and Thuringia (eastern Germany), recorded by Vibius Sequester as Cervetiis (Servetiis). After the Hunnic leader Attila died (in 453), Alanian Serbi presumably became independent and ruled in the east of the river Saale (in modern-day Germany) over the local Slavic population. Over time, they, it is argued, intermarried with the local Slavic population of the region, adopted Slavic language, and transferred their name to the Slavs. According to Tadeusz Sulimirski, similar event could occur in the Balkans Serbia, settled by Slavs who came from the north and who were ruled by already slavicized Serboi.

Deformed human skulls that are connected to the Alans are also discovered in the area that was later designated as "White Serbia". According to Indo-European interpretation, different sides of the World are designated with different colors, thus, white color is a designation for the west, black color for the north, blue or green color for the east and red color for the south. According to that view, White Serbia and White Croatia were designated as western Serbia and western Croatia, and were situated in the west from some hypothetical lands that had same names and that presumably existed in the east.

=== Autochthonic theory ===
This theory assumes that Serbs are an autochthonic people in the Balkans and Podunavlje, where they presumably lived before historical Slavic and Serb migration to the Balkans in the 6th–7th centuries. Proponents of this theory (for example Jovan I. Deretić, Olga Luković Pjanović, Miloš Milojević) claimed that Serbs either came to the Balkans long before the 7th century or Serb 7th-century migration to the Balkans was only partial and Serbs who, according to De Administrando Imperio, came from the north found in the Balkans other Serbs that already lived there. It is suggested that the ancient city of Serbinum in Pannonia was named after these hypothetical autochthonic Serbs. In mainstream historiography, this is considered to be a fringe theory, and the methods used by its proponents are considered pseudoscientific.

=== Proto-Slavic theory ===
- Sporoi (Greek: Σπόροι) was according to Eastern Roman scholar Procopius (500–560) the old name of the Antae and Sclaveni, two Early Slavic branches. Procopius stated that the Sclavenes and Antes spoke the same language, but did not trace their common origin back to the Venethi but to a people he called "Sporoi". He derived the name to Greek σπείρω ("I scatter grain"), because "they populated the land with scattered settlements". According to Bohemian historian Josef Dobrovský (1753–1829) and Slovak historian Pavel Jozef Šafárik (1795–1861) it was a corruption of Srbi (Serbs). Šafárik deemed that it was the oldest generic name of the Slavs.
- In the mid-9th century the so-called Bavarian Geographer wrote that people named Zeriuani had so large kingdom that all Slavic peoples originated from there (or from them). According to one of interpretations, Zeriuani are identified with Serbs, and there are opinions that "Serbs" was an old name of all Slavic peoples. However, according to other opinions, Zeriuani might be a name used for Severians or Sarmatians instead for Serbs.

== See also ==
- Genetic studies on Serbs
- Names of the Serbs and Serbia

== Sources ==
- Novaković, Relja (1992). Još o poreklu Srba. Miroslav.
- Janković, Đorđe (2004). "The Slavs in the 6th Century North Illyricum". Гласник Српског археолошког друштва. 20: 39–61.
- Petrović, Aleksandar M. (1997). Kratka arheografija Srba: (Srbi prema spisima drevnih povesnica). Nevkoš.
- Petković, Živko D. (1926). Prve pojave srpskog imena. Štampa Tucović.
