= Serbian–Sorbian relations =

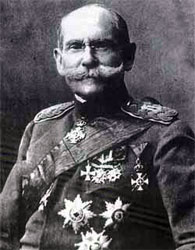
Pavle Jurišić Šturm was a Serbian general of Sorbian origin

Serbs, a South Slavic people, and Sorbs, a West Slavic people, have been theorized to have common ancestry prior to the Migration Period due to their ethnonym (Serbs, Srbi, Serby).

== Ethnology ==
The Serbs call themselves Srbi, the Sorbs (Serbian: Lužički Srbi) call themselves Serbja or Serby. Sorbs use the term "South Sorbs" (Južni Serbja) for Serbs.

The two ethnic groups may share the ethnonym due to them having been a single ethnic group before the 6th century.

A genetic study of Sorbs showed that they share greatest affinity with Poles, while results were compared to Serbia and Montenegro due to historical hypotheses, showing that "The Sorbs were most different to Serbia and Montenegro, likely reflecting the considerable geographical distance between the two populations."

== History ==
=== Medieval ===
According to Emperor Constantine VII's De Administrando Imperio (950s), an unnamed 7th-century Serbian ruler led the Serbs from their homeland, White Serbia, to settle in the Balkans during the reign of Byzantine Emperor Heraclius (610–641). The work states that he was the progenitor of the first Serbian dynasty (known as the Vlastimirović), and that he died before the settlement of the Bulgars (680).

According to German historian Ludwig Albrecht Gebhardi (1735–1802), the Serb archon was a son of Dervan, who was the Duke (dux) of the Surbi, east of the Saale. This theory was supported by Miloš Milojević, and Relja Novaković included the possibility that they were relatives in his work.

=== Modern ===
During World War I one of the most important commanders in the Serbian army was Pavle Jurišić Šturm, a Serbian general, who was according to Serbian sources of Sorbian origin. However, he is not mentioned in any Sorbian sources. In 1944 Sorb writer Jurij Chěžka was killed in Serbia, reportedly on his way to join Yugoslav Partisans. He introduced modern poetry in Sorbian literature.

== Serbo-Croatian works on Sorbs ==
- Mitar S. Vlahović (1930). Lužički Srbi i njihova domovina. Društvo prijatelja Lužičkih Srba u Beogradu.
- Mićo M. Cvijetić (1995). Lužički srbi i Jugosloveni: uzajamne literarne veze u periodici za književnost, nauku i kulturu : 1840-1918. Matica srpska.
- Josip Milaković (1920). Lužički Srbi: predavanje u društvu za narodno prosjvećivanje. Zemaljska Štamparija.
- Novak, Viktor (1927). Lužički Srbi u prošlosti i sadašnjosti.
- Lužički srbi i njihov vođa, Dr. Arnošt Muka. Društvo prijatelja lužičkih srba. 1929.

== See also ==
- Germany–Serbia relations
- Genetic studies on Serbs
