= Srbinda =

Mythical enemy of the God Indra

In the ancient Sanskrit book, Rigveda, Srbinda is a mythical enemy of the God Indra. He is mentioned briefly as being slain in battle by Indra along with Anarsani, Pipru, and Ahisuva, after which he "let loose the floods".

Certain historians theorize that Srbinda is related to the Serbs. Besides the alleged identical root, the name Srbinda is similar to the modern Serbian word "Srbenda", which is a superlative form of "Serb", expressing a Serb who is thoroughly and uncompromisingly devoted to all things Serbian.

German indologist Walther Wüst theorized that Srbinda was a warlord and leader of the Serbs, based on the fact that Serbs use the already mentioned term "Srbenda". He hypothesized that Srbinda and Srbenda were the same word, and that they meant someone great, strong, first among the Serbs – in line with the meaning of "Srbenda". He also theorized that when the Veda texts mention that after Indra defeats Srbinda he "let loose the floods", that floods were a metaphor for a migration of people, in this case the Serbs, migrating west.

However, according to English linguist Monier Monier-Williams, name of Srbinda is formed by Sanskrit words "Sr" (to flow) and "Bind" (to break), therefore unrelated to the Serbian ethnonym, which probably have different etymology.(check Name of the Serbs and Serbia)

== See also ==
- Origin hypotheses of the Serbs
- Hindu mythology
- Vedic mythology
