= Serbianism =

Serbianism may refer to:

- Serbianism (linguistics), a linguistic feature of Serbian language, especially a Serbian idiom or phrasing that appears in some other language.
- Serbianism (nationalism), nationalist ideology that advocates and promotes national and political interests of Serbia or Serbians.
- Anti-Serbianism, negative or derogatory attitude towards Serbia or Serbians.
- Philo-Serbianism, positive or affirmative attitude towards Serbia or Serbians.

== See also ==
- Serbia (disambiguation)
- Serbians
- Names of the Serbs and Serbia
