= Srbinovski =

Srbinovski (Macedonian: Србиновски), feminine: Srbinovska is a Macedonian toponymic surname literally meaning "someone from Srbinovo; the latter is derived from the word Srbin, "Serb" and literally means "Serb's". Notable people with the surname include:

- Dejan Srbinovski
- Goran Srbinovski
- Marjan Srbinovski, Macedonian basketball player
- Mladen Srbinovski (born 1958), Macedonian writer and publicist
