= Serboi =

Tribe living in North Caucasus

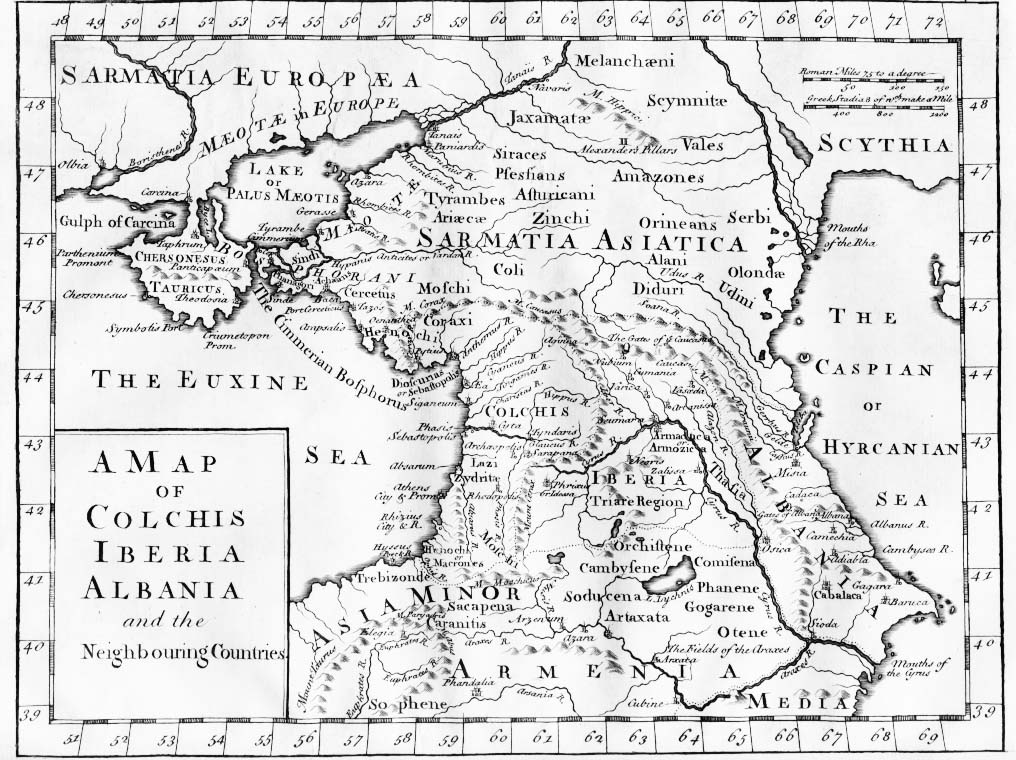
"Serbi" located near the mouth of the Volga in a map depicting Sarmatia Asiatica, c. 1770

The Serboi or Serbi (Ancient Greek: Σέρβοι, romanized: Sérboi) and Sirbi (Ancient Greek: Σίρβοι) was a tribe mentioned in Greco-Roman geography as living in the North Caucasus, believed by scholars to have been Sarmatian.

== Etymology ==
Kazimierz Moszyński derived the name from Indo-European *ser-, *serv-, meaning "guard, protect" (cognate of Latin servus), and originally, it may have meant "guardians of animals", that is "shepherds". Similar toponyms were mentioned earlier farther away.

== History ==
Pliny the Elder mentioned in Book IV of his Natural History (ca. 77–79) the Serbi among tribes inhabiting the coast east of the Sea of Azov. Almost a century later, Ptolemy (100–170) in his Geography (ca. 150) mentioned the Serboi as inhabiting, along with other tribes, the land between the northeastern foothills of the Caucasus and the Volga. The tribe was included on maps of the antique Sarmatia Asiatica as Serbi, Sirbi, in the Early modern period.

== Identification with Slavs and Serbs ==
The Sarmatians were eventually decisively assimilated (e.g. Slavicisation) and absorbed by the Proto-Slavic population of Eastern Europe around the Early Medieval Age. Scholars have connected the ethnonym with those of the Slavic peoples of Serbs and Croats in Europe. There is a theory that "Horoati" and their kin Serboi fled a Hunnic invasion into southern Poland and southeast Germany where they were assimilated by Slavs, and by the time of the 7th-century Slavic migration to the Balkans were completely Slavicized. Others believe that the tribe may in fact have been early Slavic, as noted by Lithuanian-American archaeologist Marija Gimbutas (1921–1994), and others. While some Serbian historians treat them as a Sarmatian tribe that was part of the Proto-Serb ethnogenesis, some more fringe theories treat them as a historical Serb tribe, pushing the Serbs' history further into antiquity. In the 10th century, the Byzantine emperor Constantine VII Porphyrogennetos mentions in his book De Ceremoniis two tribes named Krevatades (Krevatas) and Sarban (Sarbani) located in the Caucasus near Alania. There were most likely the original Sarmatian tribes, but some researchers identify them with the Croats and Serbs respectively.

== See also ==
- Origin hypotheses of the Serbs
- Sorbs (tribe)
- Sabirs

== Annotations ==
1. Roman author Pliny the Elder (23–79) also mentioned the "Serbonian Lake" near Palestine in his Natural History.
2. Proponents of the Iranian theory of Croat origin view that the Sarmatian *serv- may have turned into *harv- which is very similar to "Hrvat, Croat"; P. S. Sakać found Harahvaiti, Harahvatis, Horohoati denoting a province and people close to modern Afghanistan in Persian descriptions dating to Darius' time. However, Croatian scholar Radoslav Katičić refutes it as although there is a suggestive similarity, it is etymologically incorrect. Fine Jr. believes there is considerable evidence suggesting a non-Slavic, probably Iranian, origin of the 7th-century Serbs and Croats. In the 10th-century De Ceremoniis of the Byzantine emperor Constantine Porphyrogenitos, the Krevatades and Sarban are mentioned located in the Caucasus near the river Terek, and some scholars view that these were the ancestors of Croats and Serbs. According to the Polish scholar Tadeusz Sulimirski (1898–1983), the Serbs who settled in the Balkans were Slavs who came from the north and were ruled by already slavicized Alans. Lubor Niederle (1865–1944) connected the Serbs with both the Serboi and the later Sporoi.
3. Where the White Serbs and the White Croats lived in the Middle Ages, and where today, there is still a Slavic people called the "Sorbs" that inhabit that region.

== Sources ==
- Bell-Fialkoff, Andrew, ed. (2000). "The Slavs". The Role of Migration in the History of the Eurasian Steppe: Sedentary Civilization vs. 'Barbarian' and Nomad. Palgrave Macmillan US. pp. 136–. ISBN 978-1-349-61837-8.
- Brzezinski, Richard; Mielczarek, Mariusz (2002). The Sarmatians 600 BC–AD 450. Bloomsbury USA; Osprey Publishing. ISBN 978-1-84176-485-6.
- Dvornik, Francis (1959) [1956]. The Slavs: their early history and civilization. American Academy of Arts and Sciences.
- Gimbutas, Marija (1971). The Slavs. London: Thames and Hudson. p. 60.
- Niederle, Lubor (1923). Manuel de l'antiquité slave ... É. Champion.
