= Slav (ethnonym) =

The ethnonym and autonym Slav denotes the Slavic peoples of Eastern and Southern Europe. It has been reconstructed in Proto-Slavic as *Slověninъ (pl. *Slověne). The earliest written references to the Slav ethnonym are in other languages.

== Early mentions ==
Possibly the oldest mention of Slavs in almost historical form *Slověne is attested in Ptolemy's Geography (2nd century) as Σταυανοί (Stavanoi) and Σουοβηνοί (Souobenoi), both listed as Scythian tribes living near Alanians north of Scythia (first roughly between Volga and Ural Mountains, second between the Baltic Sea and Black Sea). Zbigniew Gołąb accepted Pavel Jozef Šafárik's opinion that Greeks inserted τ or θ for Slavic *sl- (reconstructing Proto-Slavic *Slɔu̯ǣnæ), and "through the labialized articulation of the vowel /ɔ/ conditioned by the preceding /u̯/" in Proto-Slavic *Su̯ɔbǣnæ (*Svoběne).

Sporoi (Ancient Greek: Σπόροι) or Spori was according to Eastern Roman/Byzantine scholar Procopius (500–560) the old name of the Antes and Sclaveni, two Early Slavic branches. Procopius stated that the Sclaveni and Antes spoke the same language, but he traced their common origin back to not the Veneti (as per Jordanes) but a people that he called Sporoi. He derived the name from Greek σπείρω ('I scatter grain'), because "they populated the land with scattered settlements". He described their society as democratic, and their language as barbaric.

Jordanes wrote about the Slavs in his work Getica (551): "although they derive from one nation, now they are known under three names, the Veneti, Antes and Sclaveni" (Latin: ab una stirpe exorti, tria nomina ediderunt, id est Veneti, Antes, Sclaveni); in 19th century identified with the West Slavs, East Slavs, and South Slavs, a division based on the linguistic similarities between particular Slavic languages and dialects. He stated that the Veneti were the ancestors of the Sclaveni and the Antes, the two having used to be called Veneti but are now "chiefly" (though, by implication, not exclusively) called Sclaveni and Antes. Jordanes' Veneti and Procopius's Sporoi were used for the ethnogenetic legend of the Slavs, the ancestors of the Slavs (the subsequent ethnic group name).

Thus, the Slav ethnonym at first denoted the southern group of the early Slavs. That ethnonym is attested by Procopius in Byzantine Greek as Σκλάβοι (Skláboi), Σκλαβηνοί (Sklabēnoí), Σκλαυηνοί (Sklauēnoí), Σθλαβηνοί (Sthlabēnoí), or Σκλαβῖνοι (Sklabînoi), while his contemporary Jordanes refers to the Sclaveni in Latin. In Ancient Greek there are no words with the root sl-, thus the original ethnonym was transformed into skl-, as that root was present (in sklērós, 'hard').

== Church Slavonic manuscripts ==
In East Church Slavonic manuscripts, the ethnonym is spelled Slověne (Словѣне), such as in the Primary Chronicle, Sofia First Chronicle, Novgorod First Chronicle and Novgorod Fourth Chronicle. In the source dating to 898 included in the Primary Chronicle, the term is used both for East Slavic tribes and more often for a people (in the Kievan Rus' society, alongside Varangians, Chuds and Kriviches).

== Etymology ==
The origin of the Slavic autonym *Slověninъ is disputed.

- According to Roman Jakobson's opinion, modified by Oleg Trubachev and John P. Maher, the name is related to the Proto-Indo-European (PIE) root *ḱlew- seen in slovo ('word') and originally denoted "people who speak (the same language)", i.e. people who understand each other. The word slovo and the related slava ('glory, fame, praise') and slukh ('hearing') originate from the PIE root *ḱlew- ('be spoken of, glory'), cognate with Ancient Greek κλέος (kléos 'fame'), whence comes the name Pericles, Latin clueo ('be called'), as well as English loud.
- Another widely cited view is expressed by Max Vasmer, who points out that the suffix Proto-Slavic *-ěninъ, *-aninъ otherwise seems to derive nouns only from toponyms; hence Vasmer assumes that this word, too, is derived from a toponym - probably a hydronym, comparable to various Slavic river names with the same apparent root such as Russian Слуя, Polish Sława, Sławica, Serbo-Croatian Славница (Slavnica), further related to Ancient Greek κλύζω (klýdzō, 'lave'), κλύζωει (klýdzōei, 'flow'), κλύδων (klýdōn, 'surf, rough water'), Latin cluō ('to clean'), cloāca ('sewer pipe'). According to this view, the connection to *slovo ('word') would be the result of a later folk etymology. It has been suggested that the word may be derived from a place named Slovo or a river named Slova. Josef Dobrovský derived the name from a supposed toponym *Slovy, arguing that the suffix *-ěninъ/*-janinъ forms names of peoples from place names. Jaroslav Rudnyckyj argued that the suffix also forms nouns from words that are not place names, such as Ukrainian virjanyn ('parishioner') from vira ('faith'), and that a derivation from *slovo therefore could not be excluded. The Old East Slavic Slavuta (Славута) for the Dnieper River was argued by Henrich Bartek (1907–1986) to be derived from *slova and also the origin of *Slověne. However, this name of the Dnieper River is only attested in the 17th century.
- Based on an uncertain identification with the ethnonym souobēnoí, which is mentioned in Ptolemy (2nd century AD), the name has been argued to be derived from Proto-Slavic adjective *svobъ ('oneself', 'one's own'; derivative *svoboda > *sloboda also meaning 'freedom', 'free settlement'), which derives from Indo-European *s(w)e/obh(o)- ('a person or thing apart, separate'), from a root *swobh ('his/hers'), meaning 'all the members of an exogamic moiety' > 'actual or potential affines/blood relatives'. It can be interpreted as 'a tribe of the free, of their own people'. Names of many Germanic tribes derive from the same root, which was not an exonym but endonym. Name of Sabini tribe also derive from root *swobʰ-. Eventually with dissimilation of *svobъ > *slobъ was secondarily associated with *slovo.

Other proposals for the etymology of *Slověninъ propounded by some scholars have much less support. B. Philip Lozinski argues that the word *slava once had the meaning of 'worshipper', in this context 'practicer of a common Slavic religion'; from that evolved into an ethnonym. S. B. Bernstein speculated that it derives from a reconstructed Proto-Indo-European *(s)lawos, cognate to Ancient Greek λαός (laós; 'population, people'), which itself has no commonly accepted etymology.

According to the widespread view, which has been known since the 18th century, the Byzantine Σκλάβινοι (Sklábinoi), Έσκλαβηνοί (Ésklabēnoí), borrowed from a Slavic tribe self-name *Slověne, turned into σκλάβος, εσκλαβήνος (Late Latin sclāvus) in the meaning 'prisoner of war slave', 'slave' in the 8th/9th century, because they often became captured and enslaved. However this version has been disputed since the 19th century.

An alternative contemporary hypothesis states that Medieval Latin sclāvus via secondary form *scylāvus derives from Byzantine σκυλάω (skūláō, skyláō) or σκυλεύω (skūleúō, skyleúō) with the meaning 'to strip the enemy (killed in a battle), to make booty, extract spoils of war'. This version is criticised as well.

== See also ==
- Sclaveni
- Sporoi
- Nemets, Niemcy
