= Genetic studies on Serbs =

DNA analysis of Serb populations

Population genetics is a scientific discipline which contributes to the examination of the human evolutionary and historical migrations. Particularly useful information is provided by the research of two uniparental markers within our genome, the Y-chromosome (Y-DNA) and mitochondrial DNA (mtDNA), as well as autosomal DNA. The data from Y-DNA and autosomal DNA suggests that the Serbs mostly are descendants of the early Slavs of the medieval migration period, according to mtDNA have genetic diversity which fits within a broader European maternal genetic landscape, and overall have a uniformity with other South Slavs from the territory of former Yugoslavia.

There are many Paleolithic period sites located in the territory of Serbia, mostly ascribed to the Mousterian phase in the Middle Paleolithic period. In the Neolithic period in Southeast Europe were founded major cultures like Vinča, Varna, Starčevo. In the Bronze Age happened symbiosis between Proto-Indo-Europeans of Kurgan culture and autochthonous populations, leading to the formation among others also of Proto-Illyrians. They gradually mixed and were assimilated by the Romans, Celts, Ostrogoths, and finally Early Slavs since the late 6th century.

== Y-DNA ==
Y-chromosomal haplogroups identified among the Serbs from Serbia and near countries are the following with respective percentages: I2a (36.6-42%), E1b1b (16.5-18.2%), R1a (14.9-15%), R1b (5-6%), I1 (1.5-7.6%), J2b (4.5-4.9%), J2a (4-4.5%), J1 (1-4.5%), G2a (1.5-5.8%), and several other uncommon haplogroups with lesser frequencies.

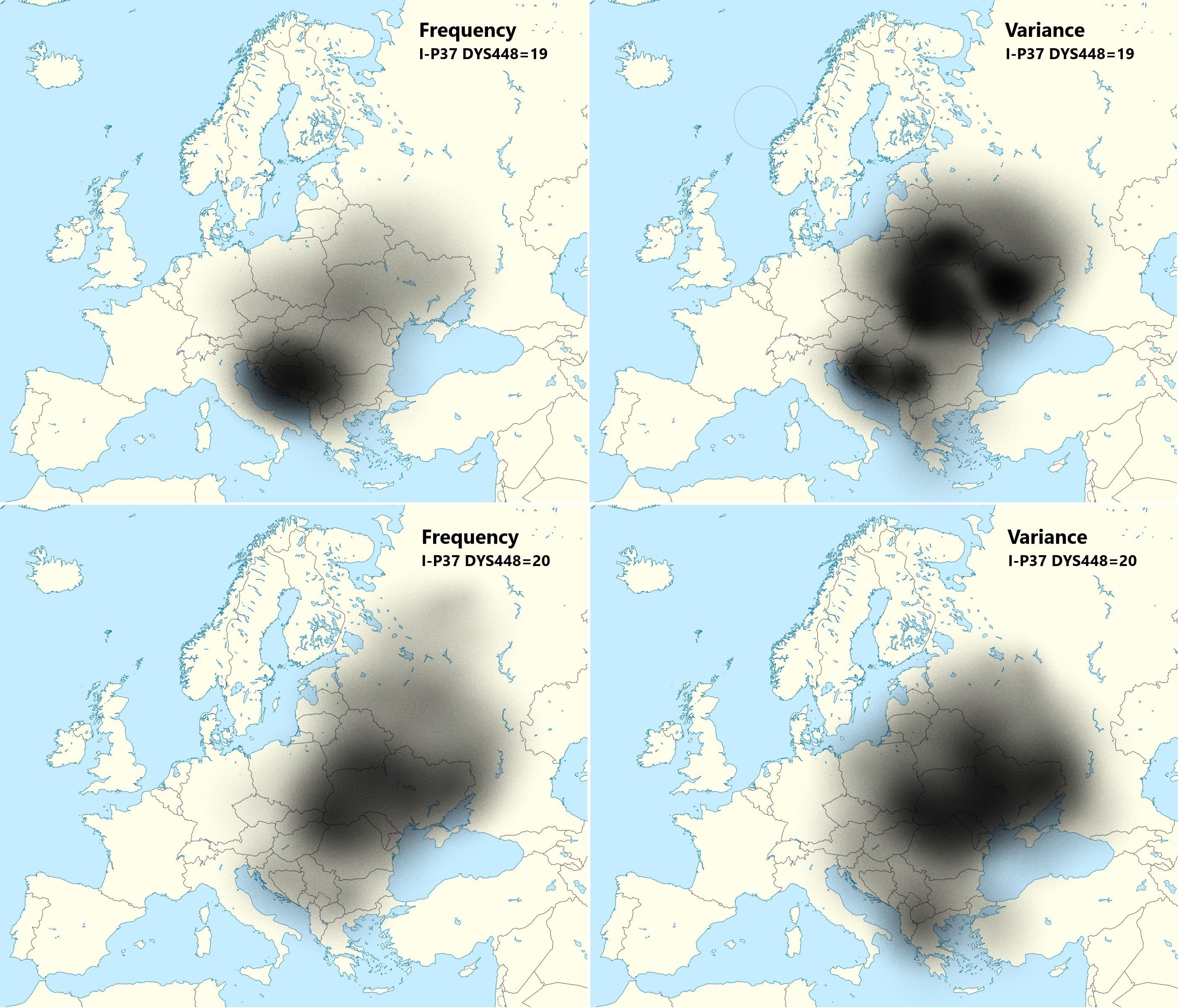
The approximate frequency and variance distribution of haplogroup I-P37 clusters, ancestral "Dnieper-Carpathian" (DYS448=20) and derived "Balkan" (DYS448=19: represented by a single SNP I-PH908), in Eastern Europe per O.M. Utevska (2017).

I2 is the most prevailing haplogroup, accounting for one-third of Serbians. According to 2019 study is represented by four sub-clusters I2-PH908 (25.08%), I2-L621 (7.59%), I2-CTS10228 (3.63%) and I2-M223 (0.33%), while according to detailed 2024 study of haplogroup I2-P37.2 was found to be predominantly represented by subclade I2-PH908 (62-79%, mostly subclades I-FT14506 and I-FT16449), followed by I2-Z17855, I2-L621, I2-Y4882, I2-Y4460, I2-CTS595, and I2-Y5595. A 2019 and 2025 study of Serb samples from different parts of the Western Balkans showed that "approximately half of them originated from Herzegovina and Old Herzegovina" which population throughout history strongly influenced today's Serbian male genetics. Older research considered that the high frequency of this subclade in the South Slavic-speaking populations to be the result of a "pre-Slavic" paleolithic settlement in the region, the research by O.M. Utevska (2017) confirmed that the haplogroup STR haplotypes have the highest diversity in Ukraine, with ancestral STR marker result "DYS448=20" comprising "Dnieper-Carpathian" cluster, while younger derived result "DYS448=19" comprising the "Balkan cluster" which is predominant among the South Slavs. This "Balkan cluster" also has the highest variance in Ukraine, which indicates that the very high frequency in the Western Balkan is because of a founder effect. Utevska calculated that the STR cluster divergence and its secondary expansion from the middle reaches of the Dnieper river or from Eastern Carpathians towards the Balkan peninsula happened approximately 2,860 ± 730 years ago, relating it to the times before Slavs, but much after the decline of the Cucuteni–Trypillia culture. More specifically, the "Balkan cluster" is represented by a single SNP, I-PH908, known as I2a1a2b1a1a1c in ISOGG phylogenetic tree (2019), and according to YFull YTree it formed and had TMRCA approximately 1,850-1,700 YBP (2nd-3rd century AD). Although I-L621 it is dominant among the modern Slavic peoples on the territory of the former Balkan provinces of the Roman Empire, until now it was not found among the samples from the Roman period and is almost absent in contemporary population of Italy. It was found in the skeletal remains with artifacts, indicating leaders, of Hungarian conquerors of the Carpathian Basin from the 9th century, part of Western Eurasian-Slavic component of the Hungarians. According to Pamjav et al. (2019) and Fóthi et al. (2020), the distribution of ancestral subclades like of I-CTS10228 among contemporary carriers indicates a rapid expansion from Southeastern Poland, is mainly related to the Slavs and their medieval migration, and the "largest demographic explosion occurred in the Balkans". Recent research also indicate that the haplogroup I2 in South Slavs is predominantly represented by subclades which came with Slavic migration from Eastern Europe.

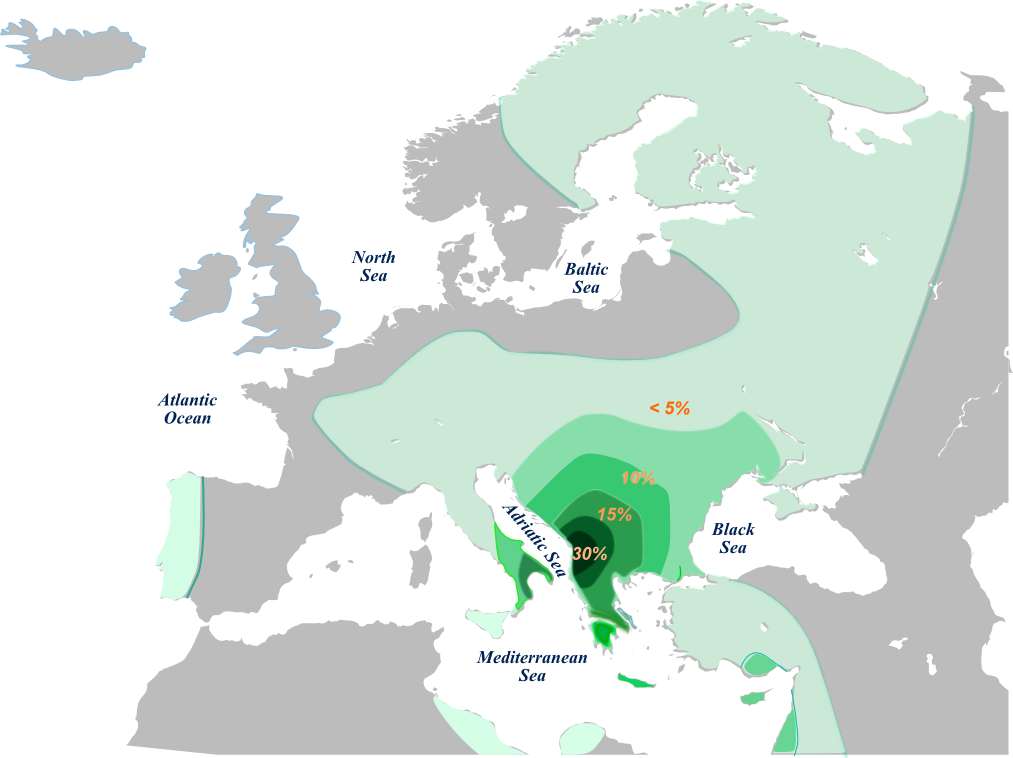
The distribution of haplogroup E-V13 in Europe.

E1b1b-M215 is the second most prevailing haplogroup amongst Serbs, accounting for nearly one-fifth of Serbians. It is represented by four sub-clusters E-V13 (17.49%), E1b1b-V22 (0.33%), and E1b1b-M123 (0.33%). In Southeast Europe, its frequency peaks at the southeastern edge of the region and its variance peaks in the region's southwest. Although its frequency is very high in Kosovar Albanians (46%) and Macedonian Romani (30%), this phenomenon is of a focal rather than a clinal nature, most likely being a consequence of genetic drift. E-V13 is also high amongst Albanians in North Macedonia (34%) and Albanians in Albania (24%), as well as ethnic Macedonians, Romanians, and Greeks. It is found at low to moderate frequencies in most Slavic populations. However, amongst South Slavs, it is quite common. It is found in 27% of Montenegrins, 22% of Macedonians, and 18% of Bulgarians, all Slavic peoples. Moderate frequencies of E-V13 are also found in Italy and western Anatolia. In most of Central Europe (Hungary, Austria, Switzerland, Ukraine, Slovakia), it is found at low to moderate frequencies of 7-10%, in both R1a (Slavic) and R1b (Germanic/Celtic) dominated populations. It likely originated in the Balkans, Greece, or the Carpathian Basin 9000 YBP or shortly before its arrival in Europe during the Neolithic. Its ancestral haplogroup, E1b1b1a-M78, is of northeast African origin.

R1a1-M17 accounts for about one-seventh to one-sixth of Serbian Y-chromosomes. It is represented by four sub-clusters R1a (10.89%), R1a-M458 (2.31%), R1a-YP4278 (1.32%), and R1a-Y2613 (0.33%). Its frequency peaks in Ukraine (54.0%). It is the most predominant haplogroup in the general Slavic paternal gene pool. The variance of R1a1 in the Balkans might have been enhanced by infiltrations of Indo-European speaking peoples between 2000 and 1000 BC, and by the Slavic migrations to the region in the early Middle Ages. A descendant lineage of R1a1-M17, R1a1a7-M458, has the highest frequency in Central and Southern Poland.

R1b1b2-M269 is moderately represented among Serbian males (6–10%), 10% in Serbia (Balaresque et al. 2010), with subclade M269* (xL23) 4.4% in Serbia, 5.1% in Macedonia, 7.9% in Kosovo. The highest frequency in the central Balkans (Myres et al. 2010). It has its frequency peak in Western Europe (90% in Wales), but a high frequency is also found in Central Europe among the West Slavs (Poles, Czechs, Slovaks) and Hungarians as well as in the Caucasus among the Ossetians (43%). It was introduced to Europe during the bronze age by incomers from the Eurasian Steppe, along with Indo-European languages. Serb bearers of this haplogroup are in the same cluster as Central and East European ones, as indicated by the frequency distributions of its sub-haplogroups with respect to total R-M269. The other two clusters comprise, respectively, West Europeans and a group of populations from Greece, Turkey, the Caucasus and the Circum-Uralic region.

J2b-M102 and J2a1b1-M92 have low frequencies among the Serbs (6–9% combined). Various other lineages of haplogroup J2-M172 are found throughout the Balkans, all with low frequencies. Haplogroup J and all its descendants originated in the Middle East. It is proposed that the Balkan Mesolithic foragers, bearers of I-P37.2 and E-V13, adopted farming from the initial J2 agriculturalists who colonized the region about 7000 to 8000 YBP, transmitting the Neolithic cultural package.

I1-M253 is also found in low frequencies (1.5-7.6%) and is represented by three sub-clusters I1-P109 (5.28%), I1 (1.32%), and I1-Z63 (0.99%).

An analysis of molecular variance based on Y-chromosomal STRs showed that Slavs can be divided into two groups: one encompassing West Slavs, East Slavs, Slovenes, and western Croats, and the other – all remaining Southern Slavs. Croats from northern Croatia (Zagreb region) fell into the second group. This distinction could be explained by a genetic contribution of pre-Slavic Balkan populations to the genetic heritage of some South Slavs belonging to the group. Principal component analysis of Y-chromosomal haplogroup frequencies among the three ethnic groups in Bosnia and Herzegovina (Bosnian Serbs, Bosnian Croats, and Bosniaks), showed that Bosnian Serbs and Bosniaks are genetically closer to each other than either of them is to Bosnian Croats (mainly due to Bosnian Croats very high I2a frequency). According to correspondence analysis, admixture analysis and Rst genetic distance, Serbian regional population samples cluster together and are closest to Montenegrins, Macedonians and Bulgarians, with Western Serbians being an intermediate between them and Croatian-Bosnian and Herzegovinian cluster. According to 2022 study on 1200 samples from Serbia, Old Herzegovina, Kosovo and Metohija, "genetic distances between three groups of samples, evaluated by the Fst and Rst statistical values, and further visualized through multidimensional scaling plot, showed great genetic similarity between datasets from Old Herzegovina and present-day Serbia. Genetic difference in the haplogroup distribution and frequency between datasets from historical region of Old Herzegovina and from geographical region of Kosovo and Metohija was confirmed with highest Fst and Rst values".

=== Y-DNA Haplogroup frequencies ===
Geographical association of the haplogroup:			East & Southeast European			North & West European		Mediterranean & Near Eastern						East Asian & Siberian			South Asian	other/undetermined
Population	Samples	Source	I2	R1a	E	I1	R1b	J1	J2a	J2b	G	T	L	N	Q	C	H	other/undetermined
Bosnia and Herzegovina
Bosnia and Herzegovina; ethnic Serbs	95	Marjanović et al. (2005), Battaglia et al. (2008), Kovačević et al. (2014)	40.00	14.70	22.10	2.10	5.20	1.10	2.10	5.20	2.10	0.00	0.00	5.20	0.00	0.00	0.00	0.00
Old Herzegovina ( Herzegovina and Northwestern Montenegro; ethnic Serbs)	400	Mihajlovic et al. (2022)	45.83	13.00	12.0	6.97	4.8	7.50			2.30	2.00		5.80	0.00	0.00	0.00	0.00
Western Serbia
Prijepolje, Ub; ethnic Serbs	67	Todorović et al. (2015)	40.30	13.43	4.48	23.88	2.99	0.00	1.49	2.99	2.99	0.00	0.00	0.00	0.00	0.00	0.00	7.46
Western Serbia; general population	237	Stevanović et al. (2007)	43.46	10.13	13.50	7.17	10.13	1.69	3.38	2.53	1.27	0.42	0.00	2.53	1.69	1.69	0.42	0.00
Central and Eastern Serbia
Central Serbia; general population	179	Mirabal et al. (2010)	37.43	13.96	17.31	7.26	4.46	0.55	3.35	1.67	2.23	0.00	0.55	3.35	1.67	0.00	2.23	0.00
Aleksandrovac county; ethnic Serbs	85	Todorović et al. (2014)	35.29	21.17	15.29	4.70	1.17	2.35	2.35	4.70	10.58	0.00	0.00	0.00	1.17	0.00	0.00	1.17
Central Serbia; general population	71	Zgonjanin et al. (2017)	33.80	16.90	16.90	11.27	5.63	2.82	4.23	2.82	0.00	0.00	0.00	1.41	2.82	0.00	1.41	0.00
Belgrade; general population	113	Peričić et al. (2005), Kushniarevich et al. (2015)	31.86	15.93	21.24	5.31	10.62	0.00	2.65	5.31	0.00	0.00	0.00	2.65	0.00	0.00	0.88	3.54
Central Serbia; general population	103	Regueiro et al. (2012)	30.10	20.40	18.50	7.80	7.70	1.00	4.00	2.90	5.80	0.00	0.00	1.90	0.00	0.00	0.00	0.00
Southern and Southeastern Serbia
Kosovo; ethnic Serbs	400	Mihajlovic et al. (2022)	35.31	12.70	23.2	4.19	8.70	11.50			2.20	1.00		0.20	0.00	0.00	0.70	0.00
Southern Serbia; general population	69	Zgonjanin et al. (2017)	31.88	13.04	28.99	7.25	2.90	4.35	1.45	1.45	1.45	0.00	0.00	2.90	2.90	0.00	1.45	0.00
Niš; general population	38	Scorrano et al. (2017)	28.95	18.42	13.16	2.63	10.53	7.89	5.26	7.89	2.63	2.63	0.00	0.00	0.00	0.00	0.00	0.00
Vojvodina
Novi sad; general population	185	Veselinović et al. (2008)	32.43	15.14	15.68	6.49	10.27	1.08	3.78	7.57	1.62	0.54	0.00	0.54	1.62	0.54	2.70	0.00
Vojvodina; general population	69	Zgonjanin et al. (2017)	30.43	18.84	21.74	4.35	5.80	1.45	1.45	4.35	4.35	0.00	0.00	7.25	0.00	0.00	0.00	0.00
Multiple regions
Serbia; ethnic Serbs	400	Mihajlovic et al. (2022)	39.24	13.8	14.50	9.56	5.50	10.8			1.80	0.50		3.00	0.80	0.00	0.80	
Serbia (North, Central, South); general population	209	Zgonjanin et al. (2017)	32.05	16.27	22.49	7.66	4.78	2.87	2.39	2.87	1.91	0.00	0.00	3.83	1.92	0.00	0.96	0.00
Serbia (Niš, Brestovac, Studenica, Šumadija); general population	67	Scorrano et al. (2017)	41.79	14.93	16.42	1.49	5.97	4.48	4.48	4.48	1.49	4.48	0.00	0.00	0.00	0.00	0.00	0.00
Serbia, Montenegro, B&H, Croatia; ethnic Serbs	303	Kačar et al. (2019)	36.63	14.85	18.15	7.59	4.95	2.64	3.30	4.95	1.98	0.33	0.00	3.96	0.66	0.00	0.00	0.00
Prijepolje, Belgrade, Ub; general population	96	Todorović et al. (2015)	33.33	12.50	7.29	19.79	10.41	0.00	1.04	3.12	2.08	0.00	0.00	2.08	0.00	2.08	1.04	5.20

The dominant recent origin of the population of wider Central Serbia: pink, green and gray-blue – areas settled from the Dinaric Alps (mostly Old Herzegovina), Kosovo, and Romania, respectively. Dark red, yellow and dark blue: natives of Šopluk and Torlak, the South Morava Valley, and Eastern Serbia, respectively, and settlers from these areas (mostly in Central Serbia). Light red-oases of natives of Western and Central Serbia. Black dots – returnees from Vojvodina.

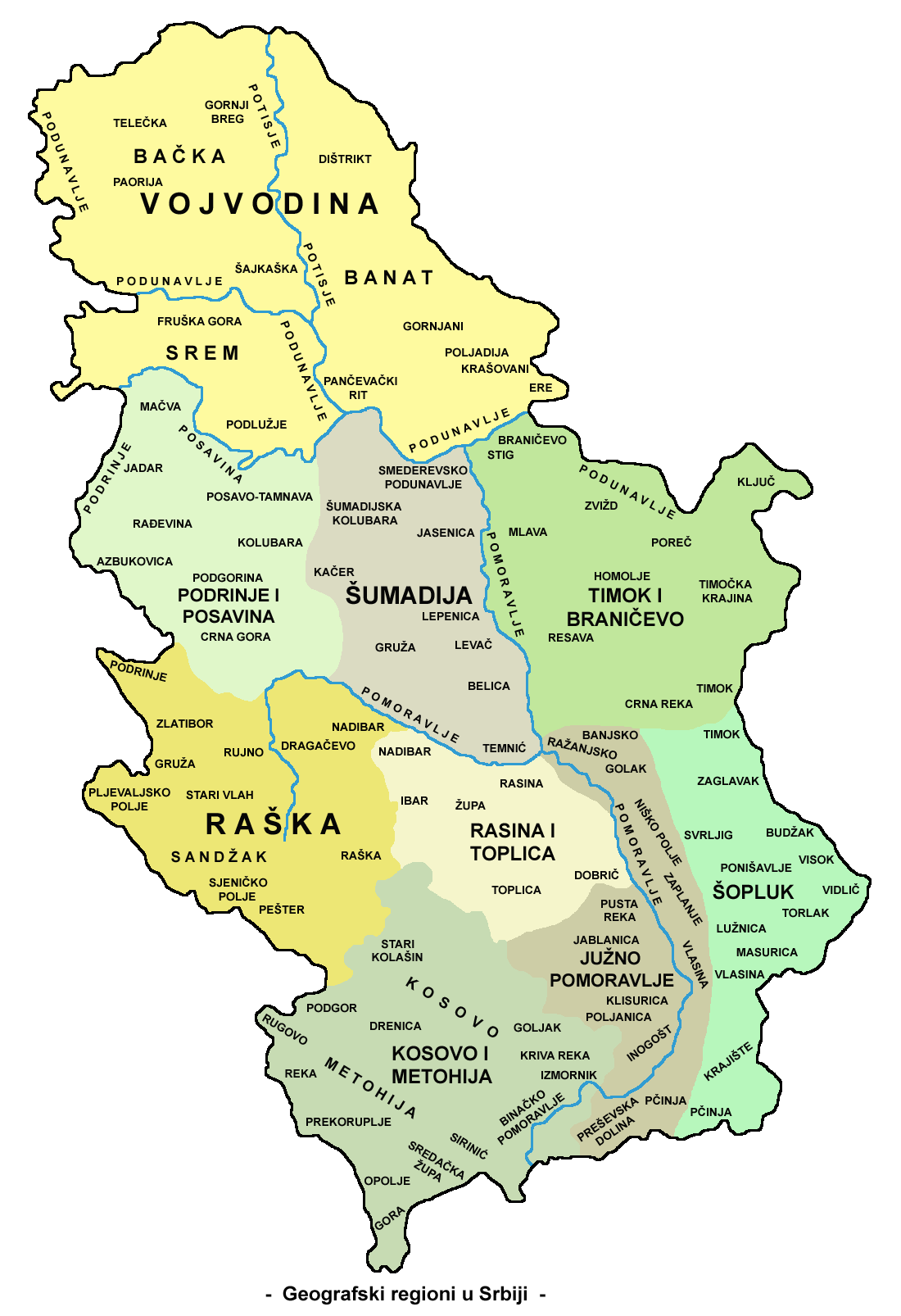
Geographical regions of Serbia

== mtDNA ==
According to Davidovic et al. (2014) study of Mitochondrial DNA in 139 samples in Serbia are present "mtDNA lineages predominantly found within the Slavic gene pool (U4a2a*, U4a2a1, U4a2c, U4a2g, HV10), supporting a common Slavic origin, but also lineages that may have originated within southern Europe (H5*, H5e1, H5a1v) and the Balkan Peninsula in particular (H6a2b and L2a1k)". According to 2017 study on haplogroup U diversity "putative Balkan-specific lineages (e.g. U1a1c2, U4c1b1, U5b3j, K1a4l and K1a13a1) and lineages shared among Serbians (South Slavs) and West and East Slavs were detected (e.g. U2e1b1, U2e2a1d, U4a2a, U4a2c, U4a2g1, U4d2b and U5b1a1). The exceptional diversity of maternal lineages found in Serbians may be associated with the genetic impact of both autochthonous pre-Slavic Balkan populations whose mtDNA gene pool was affected by migrations of various populations over time (e.g. Bronze Age pastoralists) and Slavic and Germanic newcomers in the early Middle Ages". The 2020 study of 226 samples mitochondrial genome data of Serbian population "supported more pronounced genetic differentiation among Serbians and two Slavic populations (Russians and Poles) as well as expansion of the Serbian population after the Last Glacial Maximum and during the Migration period (fourth to ninth century A.D.)".

== Autosomal DNA ==
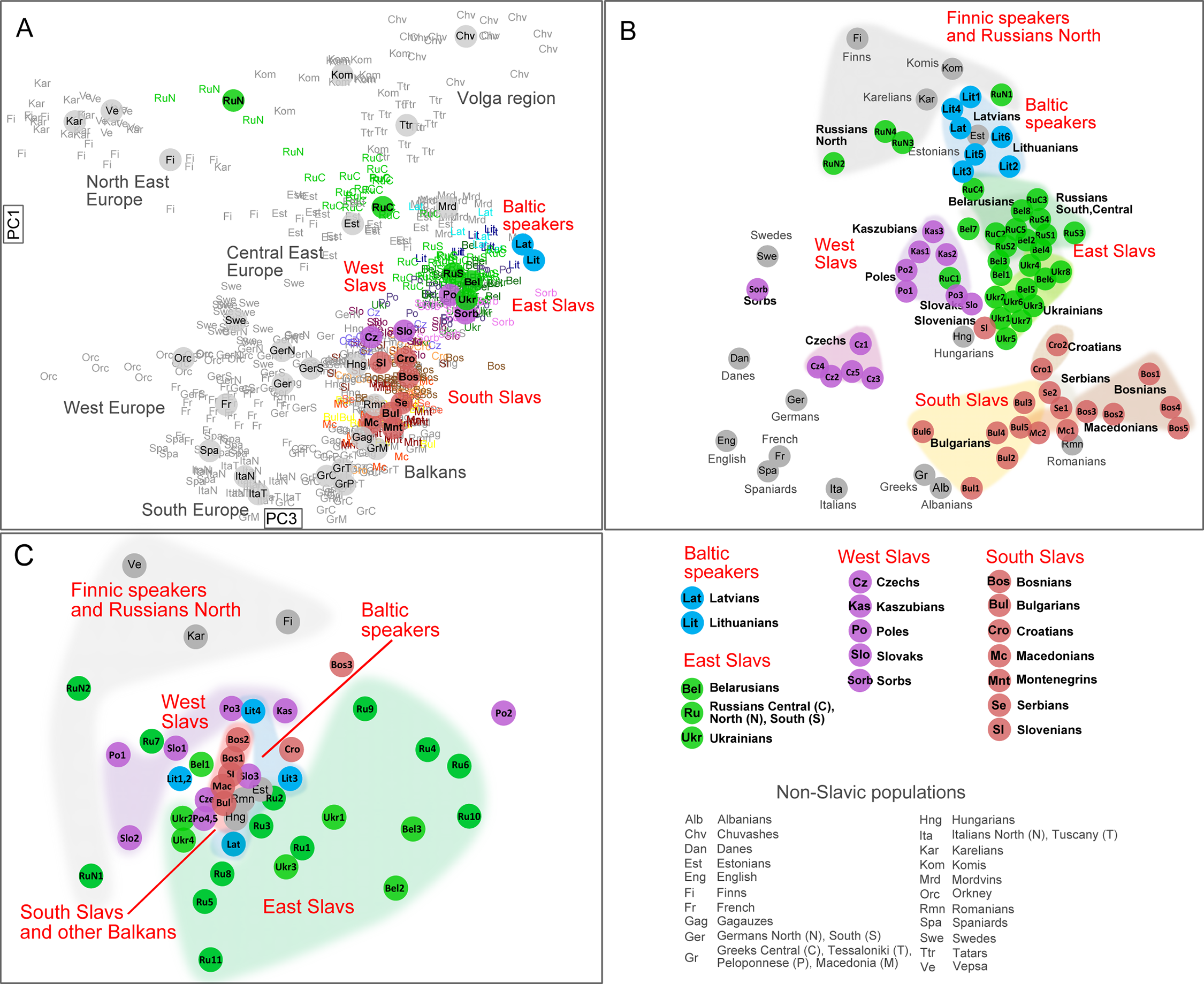
Genetic structure within European context according to three genetic systems atDNA (A), YDNA (B) and mtDNA (C) per Kushniarevich et al. (2015)

According to 2013 autosomal IBD survey "of recent genealogical ancestry over the past 3,000 years at a continental scale", the speakers of Serbo-Croatian language share a very high number of common ancestors dated to the migration period approximately 1,500 years ago with Poland and Romania-Bulgaria cluster among others in Eastern Europe. It is concluded to be caused by the Hunnic and Slavic expansion, which was a "relatively small population that expanded over a large geographic area", particularly "the expansion of the Slavic populations into regions of low population density beginning in the sixth century" and that it is "highly coincident with the modern distribution of Slavic languages". The 2015 IBD analysis found that the South Slavs have lower proximity to Greeks than with East Slavs and West Slavs, and "even patterns of IBD sharing among East-West Slavs–'inter-Slavic' populations (Hungarians, Romanians and Gagauz)–and South Slavs, i.e. across an area of assumed historic movements of people including Slavs". The slight peak of shared IBD segments between South and East-West Slavs suggests a shared "Slavonic-time ancestry". The 2014 IBD analysis comparison of Western Balkan and Middle Eastern populations found negligible gene flow between 16th and 19th century during the Islamization of the Balkans.

According to a 2014 autosomal analysis of Western Balkan, the Serbian population shows genetic uniformity with other South Slavic populations, but the "Serbians and Montenegrins have an intermediate position on PCA plot and on Fst–based network among other Western Balkan populations". In the 2015 analysis, Serbians were again in the middle of a Western South Slavic cluster (Croatians, Bosnians and Slovenians) and Eastern South Slavic cluster (Macedonians and Bulgarians). The western cluster has an inclination toward Hungarians, Czechs, and Slovaks, while the eastern cluster toward Romanians and some extent Greeks. The studies also found very high correlation between genetic, geographic and linguistic distances of Balto-Slavic populations. According to a 2020 autosomal marker analysis, Serbians are closest to Bosnians while the ethnically close Montenegrins are in-between them and Kosovo Albanians.

According to 2023 archaeogenetic study autosomal qpAdm modelling, the modern-day Serbs from the Western Balkans are 58.4% of Central-Eastern European early medieval (mostly Slavic), 39.2% of Croatia-Serbia local Roman and 2.3% Imperial Era West Anatolian ancestry.

A genetic study of Sorbs showed that they share greatest affinity with Poles, while the results of comparison to the Serbs and Montenegrins because of historical hypotheses of common origin showed that "the Sorbs were most different to Serbia and Montenegro, likely reflecting the considerable geographical distance between the two populations."

== Physical anthropology ==
According to Serbian physical anthropologist Živko Mikić, the medieval population of Serbia developed a phenotype that represented a mixture of Slavic and indigenous Balkan Dinaric traits. Mikić argues that the Dinaric traits, such as brachycephaly and a bigger average height, have been since then becoming predominant over the Slavic traits among Serbs.

== Gallery ==
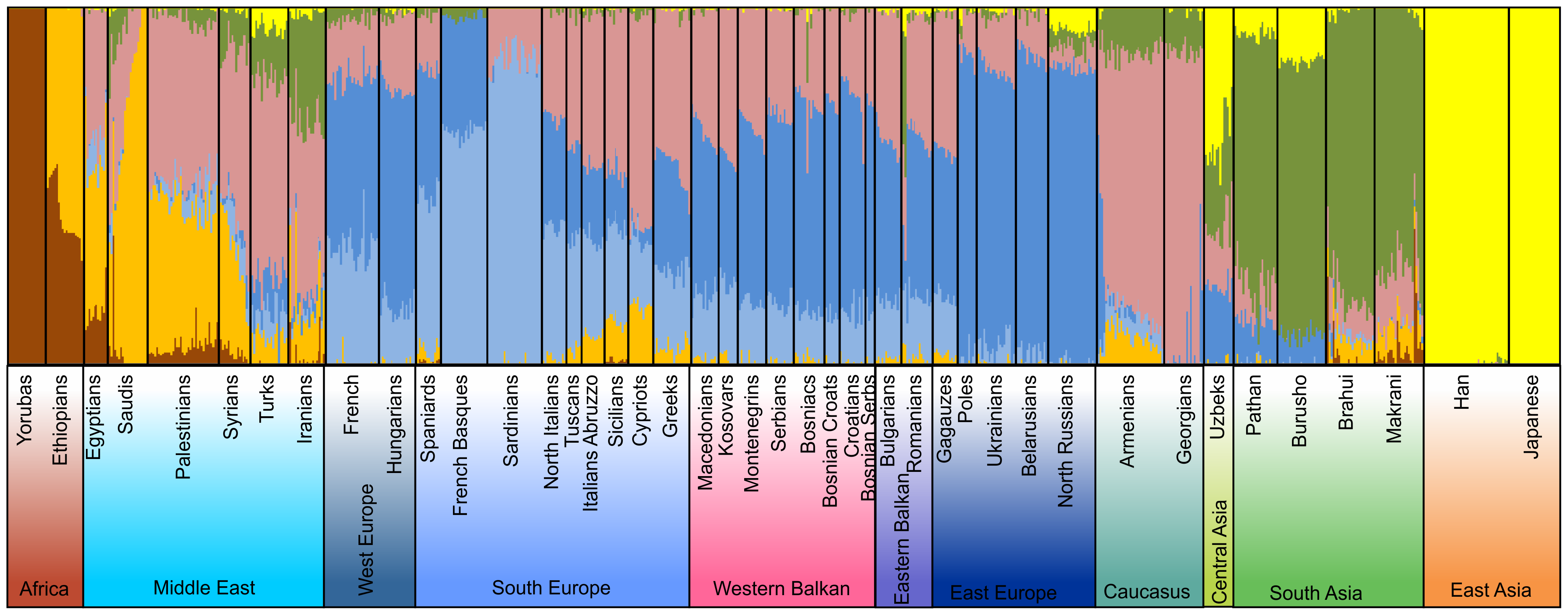
Admixture analysis of autosomal SNPs in a global context on the resolution level of 7 assumed ancestral populations per Kovačević et al. (2014)

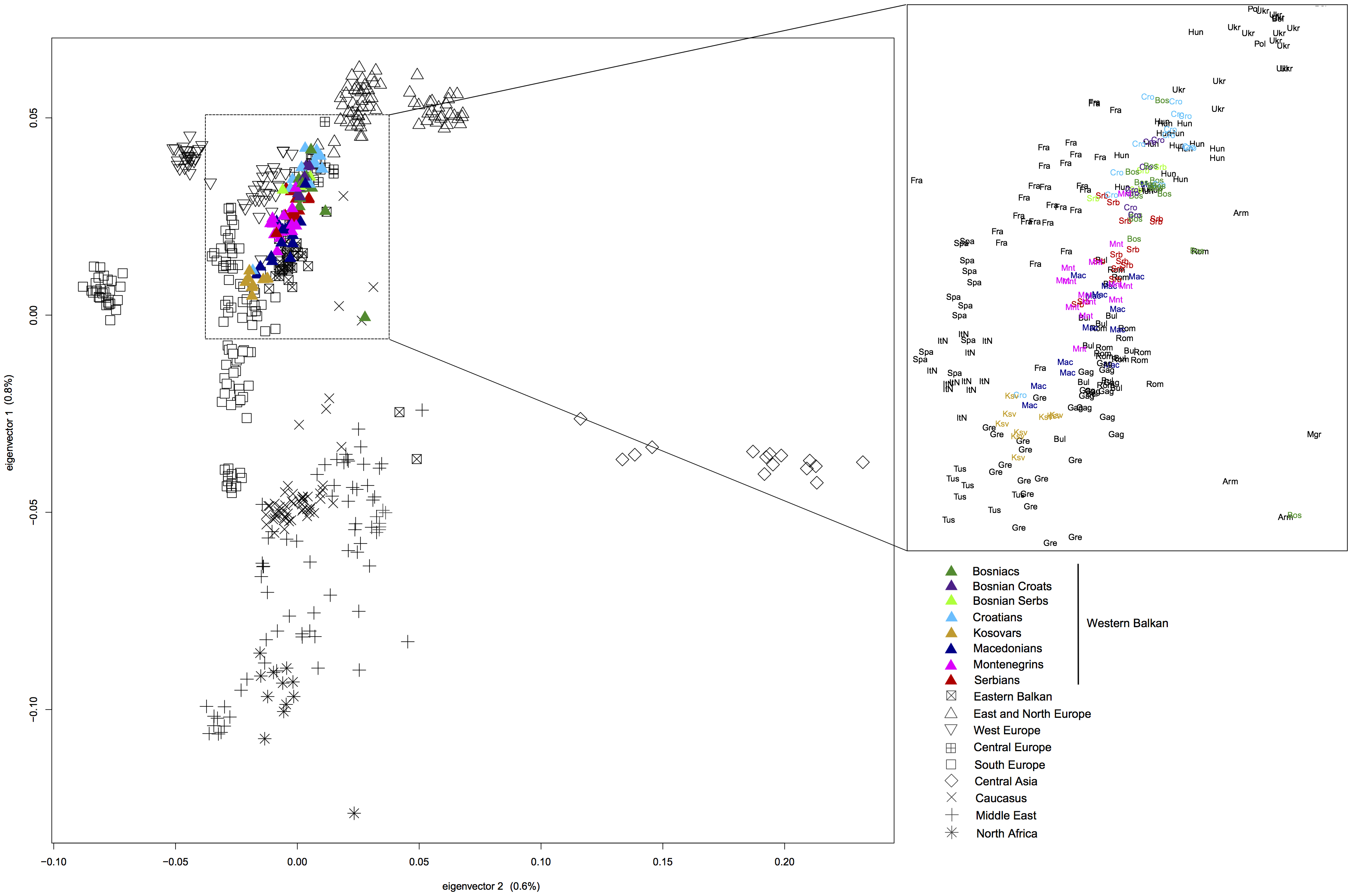
Principal component (PC) analysis of the variation of autosomal SNPs in Western Balkan populations in Eurasian context per Kovačević et al. (2014)

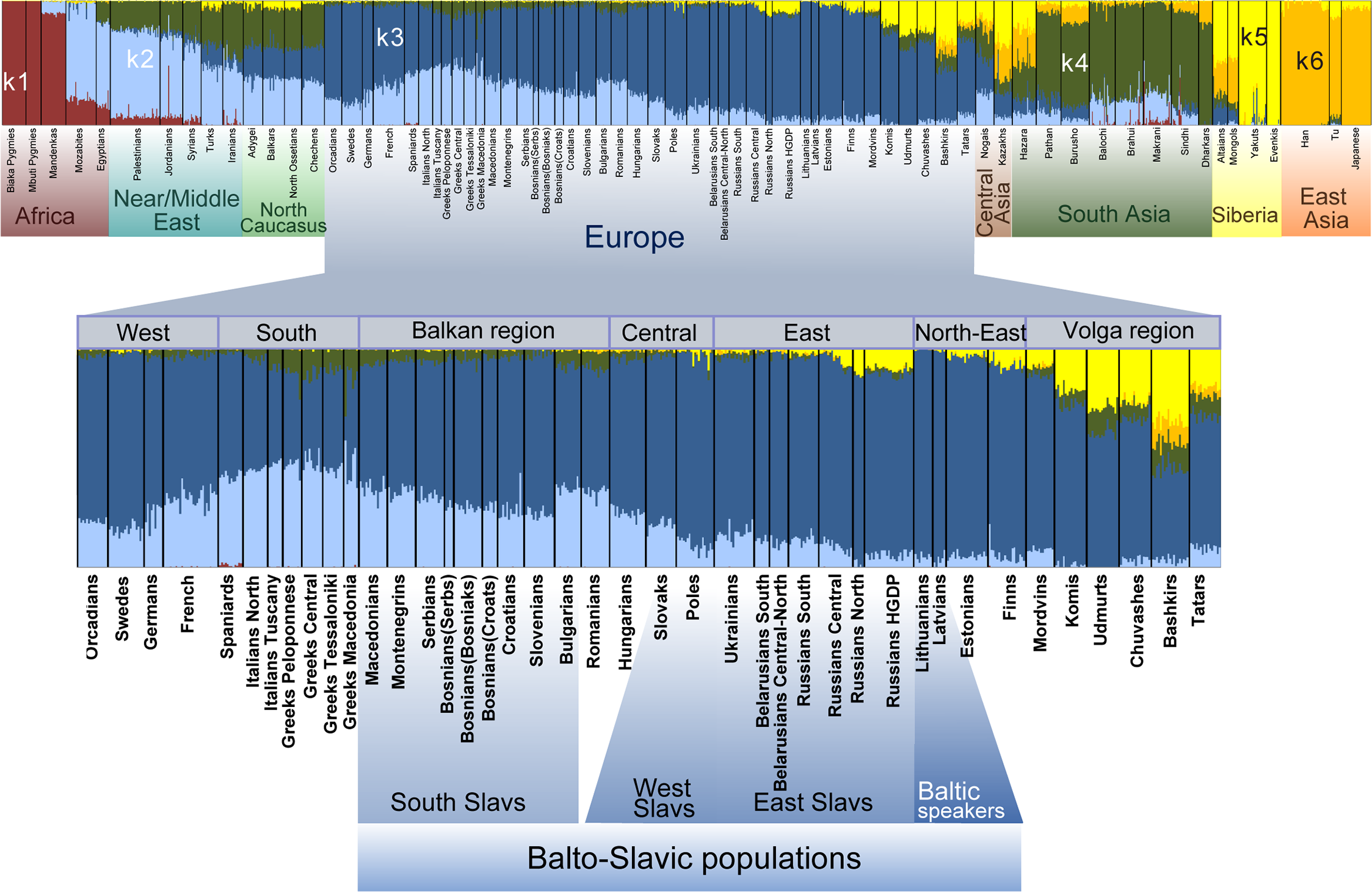
Admixture analysis on the resolution level of 6 assumed ancestral populations per Kushniarevich et al. (2015)

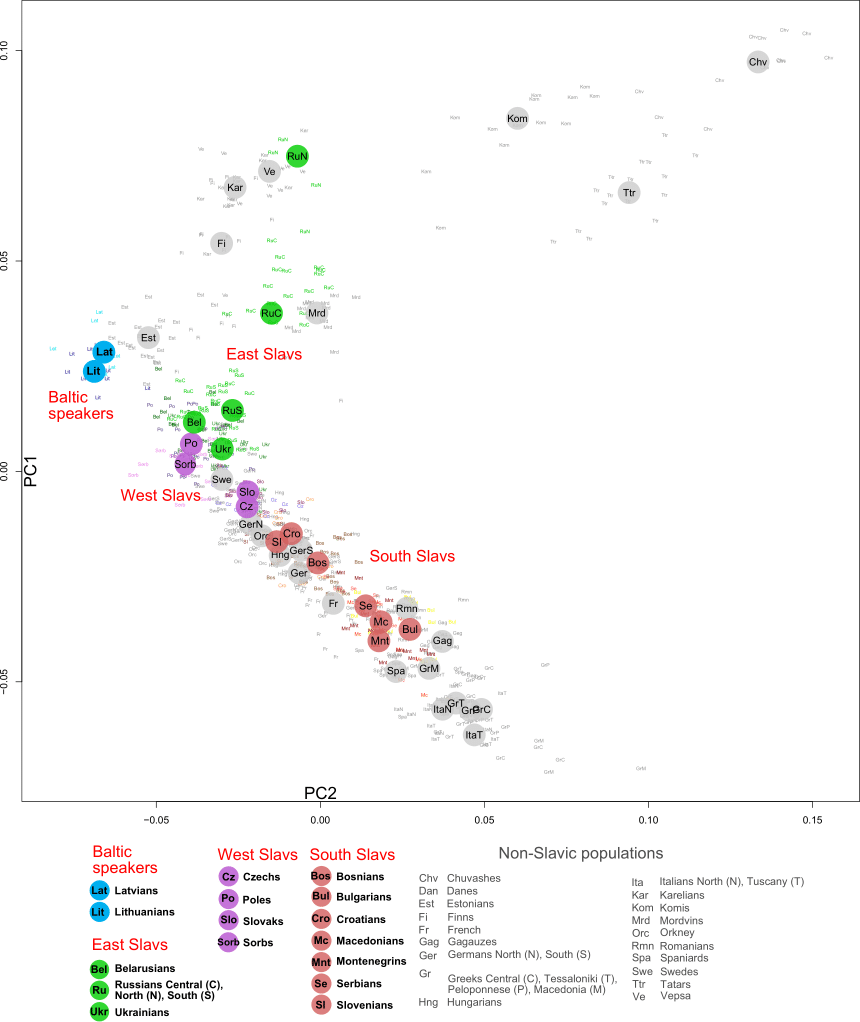
PC1vsPC2 plot based on whole genome SNP data per Kushniarevich et al. (2015)

== See also ==
- Origin hypotheses of the Serbs
- Genetic studies on Croats
- Genetic studies on Bosniaks
- Genetic studies on Bulgarians
- Y-DNA haplogroups by ethnic group
- Y-DNA haplogroups in populations of Europe

== Sources ==
- Battaglia V, Fornarino S, Al-Zahery N, Olivieri A, Pala M, Myres NM, et al. (June 2009). "Y-chromosomal evidence of the cultural diffusion of agriculture in Southeast Europe". European Journal of Human Genetics. 17 (6): 820–830. doi:10.1038/ejhg.2008.249. PMC 2947100. PMID 19107149.
- Bosch E, Calafell F, González-Neira A, Flaiz C, Mateu E, Scheil HG, et al. (July 2006). "Paternal and maternal lineages in the Balkans show a homogeneous landscape over linguistic barriers, except for the isolated Aromuns". Annals of Human Genetics. 70 (Pt 4): 459–487. doi:10.1111/j.1469-1809.2005.00251.x. PMID 16759179. S2CID 23156886.
- Cvjetan S, Tolk HV, Lauc LB, Colak I, Dordević D, Efremovska L, et al. (June 2004). "Frequencies of mtDNA haplogroups in southeastern Europe--Croatians, Bosnians and Herzegovinians, Serbians, Macedonians and Macedonian Romani". Collegium Antropologicum. 28 (1): 193–198. PMID 15636075.
- Davidovic S, Malyarchuk B, Aleksic JM, Derenko M, Topalovic V, Litvinov A, et al. (March 2015). "Mitochondrial DNA perspective of Serbian genetic diversity". American Journal of Physical Anthropology. 156 (3): 449–465. Bibcode:2015AJPA..156..449D. doi:10.1002/ajpa.22670. PMID 25418795.
- Davidovic S, Malyarchuk B, Aleksic J, Derenko M, Topalovic V, Litvinov A, et al. (August 2017). "Mitochondrial super-haplogroup U diversity in Serbians". Annals of Human Biology. 44 (5): 408–418. doi:10.1080/03014460.2017.1287954. PMID 28140657. S2CID 4631989.
- Davidovic S, Malyarchuk B, Grzybowski T, Aleksic JM, Derenko M, Litvinov A, et al. (September 2020). "Complete mitogenome data for the Serbian population: the contribution to high-quality forensic databases". International Journal of Legal Medicine. 134 (5): 1581–1590. doi:10.1007/s00414-020-02324-x. PMID 32504149. S2CID 219330450.
- Kačar T, Stamenković G, Blagojević J, Krtinić J, Mijović D, Marjanović D (February 2019). "Y chromosome genetic data defined by 23 short tandem repeats in a Serbian population on the Balkan Peninsula". Annals of Human Biology. 46 (1): 77–83. doi:10.1080/03014460.2019.1584242. PMID 30829546. S2CID 73515853.
- Kovacevic L, Tambets K, Ilumäe AM, Kushniarevich A, Yunusbayev B, Solnik A, et al. (2014). "Standing at the gateway to Europe--the genetic structure of Western balkan populations based on autosomal and haploid markers". PLOS ONE. 9 (8) e105090. Bibcode:2014PLoSO...9j5090K. doi:10.1371/journal.pone.0105090. PMC 4141785. PMID 25148043.
- Marjanovic D, Fornarino S, Montagna S, Primorac D, Hadziselimovic R, Vidovic S, et al. (November 2005). "The peopling of modern Bosnia-Herzegovina: Y-chromosome haplogroups in the three main ethnic groups". Annals of Human Genetics. 69 (Pt 6): 757–763. doi:10.1111/j.1529-8817.2005.00190.x. PMID 16266413. S2CID 36632274.
- Mirabal S, Varljen T, Gayden T, Regueiro M, Vujovic S, Popovic D, et al. (July 2010). "Human Y-chromosome short tandem repeats: a tale of acculturation and migrations as mechanisms for the diffusion of agriculture in the Balkan Peninsula". American Journal of Physical Anthropology. 142 (3): 380–390. Bibcode:2010AJPA..142..380M. doi:10.1002/ajpa.21235. PMID 20091845.
- Pericić M, Lauc LB, Klarić IM, Rootsi S, Janićijevic B, Rudan I, et al. (October 2005). "High-resolution phylogenetic analysis of southeastern Europe traces major episodes of paternal gene flow among Slavic populations". Molecular Biology and Evolution. 22 (10): 1964–1975. doi:10.1093/molbev/msi185. PMID 15944443.
- Regueiro M, Rivera L, Damnjanovic T, Lukovic L, Milasin J, Herrera RJ (April 2012). "High levels of Paleolithic Y-chromosome lineages characterize Serbia". Gene. 498 (1): 59–67. doi:10.1016/j.gene.2012.01.030. PMID 22310393.
- Scorrano G (2017). "The Genetic Landscape of Serbian Populations through Mitochondrial DNA Sequencing and Non-Recombining Region of the Y Chromosome Microsatellites". Collegium Antropologicum. 41 (3): 275–296.
- Srejic MM (2025). "Phylogeography of Y-chromosome haplogroup I-P37.2 in Serbian population groups originating from distinct parts of the Balkan Peninsula". Forensic Science International: Genetics. 74 103152. doi:10.1016/j.fsigen.2024.103152. S2CID 81826503.
- Šehović E (2018). "A glance of genetic relations in the Balkan populations utilizing network analysis based on in silico assigned Y-DNA haplogroups". Anthropological Review. 81 (3): 252–268. doi:10.2478/anre-2018-0021. S2CID 81826503.
- Todorović I, Vučetić-Dragović A, Marić A (2014). "Непосредни резултати нових мултидисциплинарних етногенетских истраживања Срба и становништва Србије (на примеру Александровачке жупе)". Glasnik Etnografskog Instituta SANU. 62 (1): 245–258. doi:10.2298/GEI1401245T. hdl:21.15107/rcub_dais_8070.
- Todorović I (2013). "Нове могућности етногенетских проучавања становништва Србије". Glasnik Etnografskog Instituta SANU. 61 (1): 149–159. doi:10.2298/GEI1301149T. hdl:21.15107/rcub_dais_8228.
- Todorović I, Vučetić-Dragović A, Marić A (2014). "Компаративни аналитички осврт на најновија генетска истраживања порекла Срба и становништва Србије – етнолошка перспектива" (PDF). Glasnik Etnografskog Instituta SANU. 62 (2): 99–111. doi:10.2298/GEI1402099T.
- Veselinovic IS, Zgonjanin DM, Maletin MP, Stojkovic O, Djurendic-Brenesel M, Vukovic RM, Tasic MM (April 2008). "Allele frequencies and population data for 17 Y-chromosome STR loci in a Serbian population sample from Vojvodina province". Forensic Science International. 176 (2–3): e23–e28. doi:10.1016/j.forsciint.2007.04.003. PMID 17482396.
- Zgonjanin D, Alghafri R, Antov M, Stojiljković G, Petković S, Vuković R, Drašković D (November 2017). "Genetic characterization of 27 Y-STR loci with the Yfiler^{®} Plus kit in the population of Serbia". Forensic Science International. Genetics. 31: e48–e49. doi:10.1016/j.fsigen.2017.07.013. PMID 28789900.
