= Population of the Byzantine Empire =

The population of the Byzantine Empire encompassed all ethnic and tribal groups living there, mainly Byzantine Greeks, but also Albanians, Armenians, Assyrians, Bulgarians, Goths, Kartvelians, Latini, Levantine Arabs, Serbs and Croats, Thracians, Turkic tribes, Thraco-Romans, Illyro-Romans, Tzans, Vlachs and other groups. It fluctuated throughout the state's millennial history. The reign of the Emperor Justinian I in the mid-sixth century was the high point of the empire's expansion; however, the arrival of plague in 541 AD and its subsequent recurrences caused a severe depletion of the population. After the reign of Emperor Heraclius (r. 610–641 AD) and the loss of the empire's overseas territories, Byzantium was limited to the Balkans and Anatolia. When the empire began to recover after a series of conflicts in the 8th century and its territories stabilized, its population began to recover. By the end of the 8th century the population of the empire was around 7,000,000, a figure that climbed to over 12,000,000 people by 1025 AD. The numbers began falling steadily to 9,000,000 people at 1204 AD and even lower to 5,000,000 people at 1282 AD with the arrival of the Turks.

== Population estimates ==
The Byzantine Empire may have had a population of over 26 million at its height.

Year	Population (estimated)	Area (km^{2}; estimated)	Population density (per km^{2}; estimated)	Notes
300	18,000,000	2,000,000	9	Roman East
311	17,000,000	2,100,000	8.1	Roman East
457	16,000,000	2,350,000	6.81	Roman East
518	19,000,000	2,300,000	8.26	
540	26,000,000-30,000,000	3,200,000	8.13	Just before the Plague of Justinian
565	20,000,000	3,400,000	5.88	Justinian I's death
600	17,000,000	2,900,000	5.86	
641	10,500,000	1,500,000	7	
668	10,000,000	1,300,000	7.69	
775	7,000,000	880,000	7.95	
842	8,000,000	1,000,000	8	
959	9,000,000	1,100,000	8.18	
1025	12,000,000	1,675,000	7.16	Basil II's death
1097	5,000,000	555,000	9.09	First Crusade
1143	10,000,000	1,000,000	10	John II's death
1204	9,000,000	610,000	14.75	Fourth Crusade
1282	5,000,000	550,000	9.09	Michael VIII's death
1312	2,000,000	460,000	4.35	
1320	2,000,000	420,000	4.76	

== See also ==
- Armenians in the Byzantine Empire

== Bibliography ==
- James, Liz, ed. (2010). A Companion to Byzantium. Chichester, West Sussex: John Wiley & Sons. ISBN 978-1-4051-2654-0.
- Treadgold, Warren T. (1997). A History of the Byzantine State and Society. Stanford, CA: Stanford University Press. ISBN 0-8047-2630-2.
- Treadgold, Warren T. (2001). A Concise History of Byzantium. Basingstoke: Palgrave. ISBN 0-333-71829-1.
