= Names of the Serbs and Serbia =

Names of the Serbs and Serbia are terms and other designations referring to general terminology and nomenclature on the Serbs (Serbian: Срби, Srbi, pronounced [sr̩̂bi]) and Serbia (Serbian: Србија/Srbija, pronounced [sř̩bija]). Throughout history, various endonyms and exonyms have been used in reference to ethnic Serbs and their lands. Basic terms, used in Serbian language, were introduced via classical languages (Greek and Latin) into other languages, including English. The process of interlingual transmission began during the early medieval period, and continued up to the modern times, being finalized in major international languages at the beginning of the 20th century.

== Etymology ==
The ethnonym is mentioned in the Middle Ages as Cervetiis (Servetiis), gentis (S)urbiorum, Suurbi, Sorabi, Soraborum, Sorabos, Surpe, Sorabici, Sorabiet, Sarbin, Swrbjn, Servians, Sorbi, Sirbia, Sribia, Zirbia, Zribia, Suurbelant, Surbia, Serbulia (or Sorbulia), among others. There exist two prevailing theories on the origin of the ethnonym *Sŕbъ (plur. *Sŕby), one from Proto-Slavic language and another from an Iranian-Sarmatian language. Other derivations like from Old Indic sarbh- ('fight, cut, kill'), sero ('make up, constitute'), and Greek: siro (σιρω, 'repeat') are considered unreliable.

The most prominent theory considers it of Proto-Slavic origin. According to Hanna Popowska-Taborska, who also argued native Slavic provenance of the ethnonym, the theory advances a conclusion that the ethnonym has a meaning of a family kinship or alliance, and it is argued by Pavel Jozef Šafárik, Josef Perwolf, Aleksander Brückner, Franz Miklosich, Jan Otrębski, Heinz Schuster-Šewc, Grigory Andreyevich Ilyinsky, J. J. Mikkola, Max Vasmer, Franciszek Sławski among others. German-Sorbian scholar Schuster-Šewc listed the *srъb- / *sьrb- roots in Slavic words meaning "to sip, munch", found in Polish s(i)erbać, Russian serbat', etc., and also cognates in non-Slavic languages, such as Lithuanian suřbti, Middle German sürfen, which all derive from Indo-European onomatopoeic roots *serbh- / *sirbh- / *surbh- meaning "to sip, to breast-feed, to flow". According to him, the basis of the ethnonym lies in "kinship by milk" and "brotherhood in milk" which was widespread in early ethnic groups (between both relatives and non-relatives) and thus carried the secondary meanings of "those who belong to the same family, kinsman"; "member of the same kin, tribe"; and finally an ethnonym (name of a people, nation). According to Vasmer's etymological dictionary, the root *sъrbъ is most probably connected with Russian paserb (пасерб, "stepson") and Ukrainian pryserbytysja (присербитися, "join in") in the meaning of "alliance". Zbigniew Gołąb similarly derived it from Proto-Indo-European in the meaning of "outgrowth, member of the family". Stanisław Rospond derived the denomination of Srb from srbati (cf. sorbo, absorbo), and Proto-Indo-European base *serpłynąć as a possible reference to the humid areas inhabited by the same people, which was also argued by Stanisław Kozierowski.

Another theory considers it of Iranian origin. Oleg Trubachyov derived it from Indo-Aryan *sar- (head) and *bai- (to hit), or assumed Scythian form *serv that in Old Indian sarva has a meaning of "all" which has a semantic analogy in Germanic Alemanni. There are also those like J. Nalepa who related the ethnonym of the Serbs and Croats, and Kazimierz Moszyński derived Slavic sьrbъ and Sérboi (Σέρβοι) from Indo-European *ser-v- (to protect) which had an equivalent in classical Scythian language, *хаrv-, from which presumably derived the Slavic ethnonym *хṛvati (Croats). Aleksandar Loma considered that there's "no convincing Slavic etymology" as is probably of an Iranian origin. However, this theory is rejected by some Ukrainian scholars, and Russian linguists like Vyacheslav Ivanov and Vladimir Toporov. Such scholars claim the Serbs are unrelated to the East Slavs and, in their view, the scholarship clearly shows that the origin and meaning of the Serbian ethnonym is distant from the Croatian ethnonym.

== Endonym ==
The earliest mention of the Serbs in the Balkans appears to be from Einhard's Royal Frankish Annals, written in 822 AD, when prince Ljudevit went from his seat at Sisak to the Serbs (believed to have been somewhere in western Bosnia). Einhard mentions "the Serbs, a people that is said to hold a large part of Dalmatia" (Latin: ad Sorabos, quae natio magnam Dalmatiae partem obtinere dicitur). De Administrando Imperio, written by Byzantine emperor Constantine VII in the mid-10th century, tells a version of the early history of the Serbs. He mentions White Serbia (or Boiki), from whence migrated the White Serbs. The emperor contended that their name in the tongue of the Romans means a "servant"; because of which the serbula signifies 'menial shoes', while tzerboulianoi is for those who wear poor man's footwear; and additionally, that the region or town of Servia (Serblia) near Thessaloniki received its name from the Serbs who once lived there. This derivation is false etymology (a paraetymology), and the account's reliability is also disputed.

Some scholars argue that the Serb ethnonym is antique. According to this theory, it is connected to the mentions of Tacitus in 50 AD, Pliny the Elder in 77 AD (Naturalis Historia) and Ptolemy in his Geography 2nd century AD, of the Sarmatian tribe of Serboi of the North Caucasus and Lower Volga. Đorđe Branković (1645–1711), in his Chronicles, wrote: "The Serbian name comes from the Savromat name, as Philipp Melanchthon testifies... According to a second version the Serbian name comes from the Sires people who used to live in the Asian part of Scythia. Among the Sires, wool grew in the same way as silk". In 1878, Henry Hoyle Howorth connected Ptolemy's mention of the town of Serbinum (Σέρβινον), modern Gradiška, Bosnia and Herzegovina, to the Serbs, and also found the Serb ethnonym Cervetiis (Servetiis) in the works of Vibius Sequester. In De Bello Gothico Procopius (500-565) uses the name Sporoi as an umbrella term for the Slavic tribes of Antes and Sclaveni, it is however not known whether the Slavs used this designation for themselves or he himself coined the term. It has been theorized by the older generation of scholars that the name is a corruption of the ethnonym Serbs, as Sporoi may be identical with 'Sorpi=Serpi=Serbi' and 'Sclavini'.

== Exonyms ==
During the medieval and early modern period, several exonyms were used as designations for Serbs and Serbia.

Rascia and Rasciani

Since the late 12th century, the term Rascia (Рашка, Raška), with several variants (Rasscia, Rassia, Rasia, Raxia), was used as an exonym for Serbia in Latin sources, along with other names such as Servia, Dalmatia and Slavonia. It was derived from the town of Ras, a royal estate, and seat of an eparchy. The first attestation is in a charter from Kotor dated to 1186, in which Stefan Nemanja, the Grand Prince (1166–1196), is mentioned as "župan of Rascia". It was one of the common names for Serbia in western sources (Papacy, Italian, German, French, etc.), often in conjunction with Serbia (Servia et Rascia). "Rascia" was never used in Byzantine works.

The term is often used in modern historiography to refer to the medieval "Serbian hinterland" or "inner Serbia", that is, the inland territories in relation to the maritime principalities at the Adriatic (the "Pomorje"). The term is attested since the late 12th century, but in historiography, the early medieval Serbian Principality is sometimes also called Raška (Rascia), erroneously (and anachronistically). In DAI, the Serbian hinterland is called "baptized Serbia", while Ras is only mentioned as a border town. The misconceptions arose from the much later Chronicle of the Priest of Duklja, that projected later terminology on earlier periods. In historical reality of the early medieval period, the city of Ras became a local administrative center only in 970-975, when Byzantines created a short-lived Catepanate of Ras. In 1019, the Eparchy of Ras was organized, with jurisdiction over eastern parts of inner Serbia, and thus the foundation was laid for gradual emergence of a regional name, derived from Ras. Retaking the city of Ras from Byzantines, local Serbian rulers made it one of their main seats, and since it was also a seat of a local bishop of Ras, it gradually became the most important center of inner Serbia. By the end of the 12th century, term Raška (Rascia) became common designation for central parts of inner Serbia, and it was also used to designate the state centered in that region, namely the Serbian state of the Nemanjić dynasty.

Between the 15th and 18th centuries, the term (Latin: Rascia, Hungarian: Ráczság) was used to designate the southern Pannonian Plain inhabited by Serbs, or "Rascians" (Latin: Rasciani, Natio Rasciana, Hungarian: Rác(ok)), who had settled there following the Ottoman conquests and Great Serb migrations.

Other medieval exonyms

- The Serbs were often called "Triballi" in Byzantine works. The Triballi was an ancient Thracian tribe that inhabited the area of the Morava Valley in southern Serbia. They were last mentioned in the 3rd century. The educated Byzantine authors sought an ancient name for the Serbs, and adopted it as the most likely. It was in use between the 11th and 15th century.
- In the Byzantine chronicle Alexiad, covering the 11th century (written in 1148), Anna Komnene mentions the Serbs by the names Sklaveni and Dalmati (Δαλμάται, Dalmatai), with Dalmatia starting from Kosovo and Metohija. John Kinnamos, in his work covering 1118–76, wrote: "the Serbs, a Dalmatic (Dalmatian) tribe" (Greek: Σέρβιοι, έθνος Δαλματικόν), thus using "Dalmat(ian)s" or "Dalmatic (Dalmatian) people" in the context of the Serbs, and "Dalmatia" in the context of Serbia. There are numerous other, less prominent, instances, poetic for example — Theodore Prodromus, Michael Italicus and the typikon of the Pantokrator monastery, among others.

Early modern exonyms

- "Vlachs", referring to pastoralists, was a common exonym for Serbs in the Ottoman Empire and later. The term "Vlachs" was also used for Slavs who shared lifestyle (as shepherds) with Romance peoples (Vlachs); it was used for the Serbs who settled the Military Frontier. Documents of the 13th–15th century show that Vlachs, the descendants of indigenous peoples, were considered by Serbs as "other", and distinct from themselves. How Serbs perceived these differences or their basis for "othering" is largely unknown, as very little evidence survives. There were specific and separate regulations for Serbs and Vlachs, however, which included prohibition on intermarriage. Croatian nationalist historiography (including Ustashe propaganda) claim that the settlers were not Serbs, but ethnic Vlachs, thus implying that Serbs of Croatia are not Serbs. All South Slavic ethnic groups had some Romance ingredient, although there is no evidence that all or most Serbs in Croatia were of Vlach origin. In Bosnia, Orthodox Christians were called "Vlachs", actually used as a synonym of "Serbs". It was used as a derogatory term, and as a common name for Orthodox Serbs in Catholic lands, and lesser in the Ottoman Empire. Tihomir Đorđević (1868–1944), as did other academics, stressed that the name "Vlach" did not only refer to genuine Vlachs (Romance-speaking people), but also to cattle breeders in general. Serbs that took refuge in the Habsburg Military Frontier were called "Vlachs" by the Croats. In the work About the Vlachs (1806), Metropolitan Stevan Stratimirović stated that Roman Catholics from Croatia and Slavonia scornfully used the name "Vlach" for "the Slovenians (Slavs) and Serbs, who are of our, Eastern [Orthodox] confession", and that "the Turks (Muslims) in Bosnia and Serbia also call every Bosnian or Serbian Christian a Vlach". That the name "Vlach" used to signify the Serbs is testified by Vuk Karadžić in his many recorded proverbs. The term may have originated from Stari Vlah, from where refugees arrived in what was then the Holy Roman Empire.
- In Dalmatia, terms used for Serbs were: "Morlachs" (Morlaci), "Vlachs" (Vlasi), Rkaći, Rkači, "Greek Dalmatians" (Garčki Dalmatini), or "Greek people". The Catholics used the pejorative word rkać, derived from Venetian, for Orthodox people. The terms Rišćani, Rkaći (Grkaći), Morlaci (crni Vlasi), were used for primitive shepherds, Serbs, who moved in Bukovica, and mountain pastures on the border of Lika (Velebit) and Bosnia (Dinara).
- Illyrians (Latin: Illyrii), or the Illyrian nation (Latin: Natio Illyrica): During the early modern period, Serbs were also referred to as Illyrians, most commonly by the state administration of the Habsburg monarchy. Since the end of the 17th century, those archaic terms were used in a classicizing manner, as a historical reference for geographical position of Serbian homeland in regions that were formerly covered by the ancient Illyricum. Among official documents that used such terminology was the Declaratory Rescript of the Illyrian Nation (Latin: Rescriptum Declaratorium Illyricae Nationis), issued in 1779 by Empress Maria Theresa in order to regulate several questions related to position of the Serbian Orthodox Metropolitanate of Karlovci.

== Misnaming ==
Because of a confusion of ethnicity/nationality with religious affiliation, many authors from historic times referred to and recorded Serbs by the following names:

=== By the major regional names ===
- Bosnians
- Herzegovinians
- Krajishniks
- Slavonians

=== Pejorative ===
- Vlachs, Serbs in Croatia and Bosnia-Herzegovina
- Shkije, Serbs in Kosovo
- Serbomans, Serbs in North Macedonia
- Tschusch, Serbs in Austria
- Raci, Serbs in the Habsburg Monarchy

== Anthroponymy ==
Male given names

Srba, Srbislav, Srbivoje, Srbko, Srboje, Srbomir, Srborad, Srbomil, Srboljub, Srbobran.

Female given names

Srbijanka, Srbinka, and others.

Surnames

Srbinac, Srbinić, Srbinov, Srbinovac, Srbinović, Srbinovski, Srbić, Srbović, Srbljanović, Srbljanin, Srbljak, Srpčić, Serban, and others.

== Toponymy ==
There are many toponyms that are supposedly related to endonyms and exonyms for Serbs.

=== Historical ===
- Gordoservon/Servochoria, in Phrygia of Anatolia (modern central Turkey) (early Middle Ages)
- Novaya Serbiya, military province in Imperial Russia (modern Ukraine) (1752–1764)
- Slavyanoserbiya, military province in Imperial Russia (modern Ukraine) (1753–1764)
- Republic of Serbian Krajina, self-proclaimed Serb state in Croatia (1991-1995)

== Renderings in other languages ==
- Bosnian, Croatian, Montenegrin: Sȑbi (Ср̏би)
- Albanian: Serbët
- Arabic: صرب
- Armenian: սերբեր
- Azerbaijani: serblər
- Belarusian: Сербы (Serby)
- Bulgarian: Съ́рби (Sǎ́rbi)
- Burmese: ဆားဘီးယား
- Simplified Chinese: 塞尔维亚人
- Traditional Chinese: 塞爾維亞人
- Church Slavonic: Срь́би
- Czech: Srbové
- Danish: Serbere
- Dutch: Serviërs / Serven
- Esperanto: Serboj
- Estonian: Serblased
- Finnish: Serbit
- French: Serbes
- Georgian: სერბები
- German: Serben
- Greek: Σέρβοι (Sérvi)
- Hebrew: סרבים
- Hindi: सर्ब लोग
- Hungarian: Szerbek
- Indonesian: Orang Serbia
- Italian: Serbi
- Japanese: セルビア人
- Korean: 세르비아인
- Latin: Serbī or Servii
- Latvian: Serbi
- Lithuanian: Serbai
- Macedonian: Срби
- Malay: Orang Serbia
- Maltese: Serbi
- Norwegian: Serbere
- Iron Ossetic: Сербаг адæм
- Polish: Serbowie
- Portuguese: Sérvios
- Romanian: Sârbi
- Russian: Се́рбы (Sérby)
- Slovak: Srbi
- Slovene: Sȓbi
- Spanish: Serbios
- Swedish: Serber
- Tatar: Серблар
- Thai: ชาวเซอร์เบีย
- Turkish: Sırplar
- Ukrainian: Се́рби (Sérby)
- Welsh: Serbiaid
- Historically in medieval French and English: Serviani/Servians

== See also ==
- Serbian names

== Sources ==
Primary

- Martin, Joannes Baptista; Petit, Ludovicus, eds. (1907). "Serborum in Hungaria degentium synodi et constitutiones ecclesiasticae". Sacrorum conciliorum nova et amplissima collectio. Vol. 39. Parisiis: Huberti Welter, Bibliopolae. pp. 497–956. Archived from the original on 2020-12-04.
- Moravcsik, Gyula, ed. (1967) [1949]. Constantine Porphyrogenitus: De Administrando Imperio (2nd revised ed.). Washington D.C.: Dumbarton Oaks Center for Byzantine Studies. ISBN 9780884020219.
- Pertz, Georg Heinrich, ed. (1845). Einhardi Annales. Hanover.
- Scholz, Bernhard Walter, ed. (1970). Carolingian Chronicles: Royal Frankish Annals and Nithard's Histories. University of Michigan Press. ISBN 0472061860.
- Кунчер, Драгана (2009). Gesta Regum Sclavorum. Vol. 1. Београд-Никшић: Историјски институт, Манастир Острог.
- Живковић, Тибор (2009). Gesta Regum Sclavorum. Vol. 2. Београд-Никшић: Историјски институт, Манастир Острог.
- Živković, Tibor (2012). De conversione Croatorum et Serborum: A Lost Source. Belgrade: The Institute of History. Archived from the original on 2021-02-13.

Secondary

- Ćirković, Sima (2004). The Serbs. Malden: Blackwell Publishing. ISBN 9781405142915. This English translation in PDF format "corresponds to the first English edition of 2004". Made available by the author.
- Curta, Florin (2001). The Making of the Slavs: History and Archaeology of the Lower Danube Region, c.500–700. Cambridge University Press. ISBN 978-1-139-42888-0.
- Curta, Florin (2006). Southeastern Europe in the Middle Ages, 500–1250. Cambridge: Cambridge University Press.
- Donia, Robert J.; Fine, John Van Antwerp Jr. (1994). Bosnia and Hercegovina: A Tradition Betrayed. London: Hurst and Company. ISBN 9781850652113.
- Fine, John Van Antwerp Jr. (1991) [1983]. The Early Medieval Balkans: A Critical Survey from the Sixth to the Late Twelfth Century. Ann Arbor, Michigan: University of Michigan Press. ISBN 0472081497.
- Fine, John Van Antwerp Jr. (2005). When Ethnicity Did Not Matter in the Balkans: A Study of Identity in Pre-Nationalist Croatia, Dalmatia, and Slavonia in the Medieval and Early-Modern Periods. Ann Arbor, Michigan: University of Michigan Press. ISBN 0472025600.
- Howorth, Henry Hoyle (1878), The Spread of the Slaves, Journal of the Anthropological Institute, JSTOR 2841191
- Ivić, Aleksa (2008) [1922]. "О српском и хрватском имену". Projekat Rastko.
- Kunstmann, Heinrich (1996). "5.3. Was der Serbenname zu bedeuten scheint". Die Slaven: ihr Name, ihre Wanderung nach Europa und die Anfänge der russischen Geschichte in historisch-onomastischer Sicht. Franz Steiner Verlag. pp. 42–44. ISBN 978-3-515-06816-1.
- Lampe, John R.; Jackson, Marvin R. (1982). Balkan Economic History, 1550-1950: From Imperial Borderlands to Developing Nations. Indiana University Press. ISBN 0-253-30368-0.
- Lins, Joseph (1910). "Illyria". The Catholic Encyclopedia. Vol. 7. New York: Robert Appleton Company. pp. 663–664.
- Lukaszewicz, Adam (1998). "De Sclavinis et sclavis..." Dialogues d'histoire ancienne (in French). 24 (2): 129–135. doi:10.3406/dha.1998.2394.
- Papazoglu, Fanula (1978). The Central Balkan Tribes in pre-Roman Times: Triballi, Autariatae, Dardanians, Scordisci and Moesians. Amsterdam: Hakkert. ISBN 9789025607937.
- Schuster-Šewc, Η. (1985). "Zur Geschichte und Etymologie des ethnischen Namens Sorb/Serb/Sarb/Srb". Zeitschrift für Slawistik (in German). 30 (1–6): 847–852. doi:10.1524/slaw.1985.30.16.847. S2CID 170173568.
- Trbovich, Ana S. (2008). A Legal Geography of Yugoslavia's Disintegration. Oxford University Press. p. 70. ISBN 9780195333435.
