= Sarmatia =

Ancient region occupied by the Sarmatians

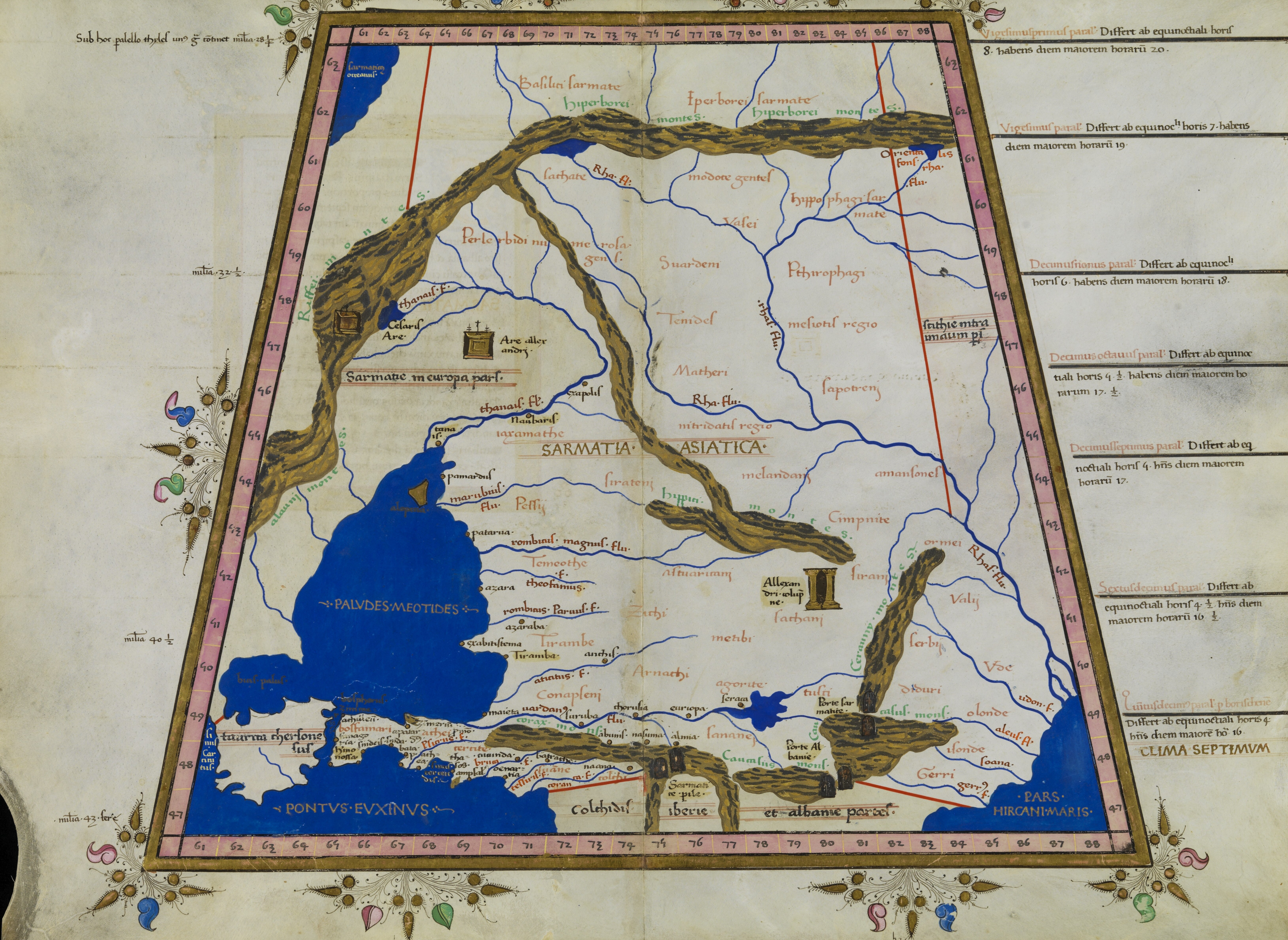
The "Second Map of Asia" (Tabula Seconda de Asia), 1467.

Sarmatia was a geographic region defined in the ancient Graeco-Roman world that encompassed the western Eurasian steppe. It was inhabited by Sarmatians, an ancient Eastern Iranic equestrian nomadic people.

Sarmatia was the name given by the Romans to the region which had formerly been known to the ancient Greeks as Scythia because it had been inhabited by the Scythians. Beginning in the late 4th century BC, a related nomadic Iranic people, the Sarmatians, moved from the east into the Pontic steppe, where they replaced the Scythians as the dominant power. Due to the Sarmatian invasion, "Sarmatia Europea" replaced "Scythia" as the name for the region.

== Geography ==
According to the map of Marcus Vipsanius Agrippa transmitted by Pliny the Elder in the late 1st century BCE, Sarmatia and Scythia Taurica were the countries between the Dnipro, the Volga and Ciscaucasia; and Pomponius Mela in the 1st century CE described Sarmatia as a large country found between the Vistula and the Ister.

Claudius Ptolemy divided Sarmatia into two parts:

- European Sarmatia (Latin: Sarmatia Europea), bounded by the Vistula and the Sarmatian Mountains in the west; the Maeotian Sea and the river Tanais in the east; the territory of the Iazyges, Dacia and the Pontus Euxinus in the south; and the Venedicus Bay of the Sarmatian Ocean and part of an unknown land in the north;
- Asiatic Sarmatia (Latin: Sarmatia Asiatica), bounded by European Sarmatia in the west; Scythia and part of the Caspian Sea in the east; the states of the Caucasus in the south; and an unknown land in the north.

== See also ==
- Sarmatism

== Sources ==
- Batty, Roger (2007). Rome and the Nomads: The Pontic-Danubian Realm in Antiquity. Oxford, United Kingdom: Oxford University Press. ISBN 978-0-198-14936-1.
- Mordvint͡seva, Valentina I. (2017). "The Sarmatians in the Northern Black Sea Region (on the Basis of Archaeological Material)". In Kozlovskaya, Valeriya (ed.). The Northern Black Sea in Antiquity: Networks, Connectivity, and Cultural Interactions. Cambridge, United Kingdom: Cambridge University Press. pp. 233–283. ISBN 978-1-139-09470-2.
