= Sporoi =

Name for Slavic branches, per Procopius

Sporoi (Greek: Σπόροι) or Spori was according to Eastern Roman scholar Procopius (500–560) the old name of the Antes and Sclaveni, two Early Slavic branches. Procopius stated that the Sclaveni and Antes spoke the same language, but he did not trace their common origin back to the Veneti (as per Jordanes) but to a people he called "Sporoi". He derived the name from Greek σπείρω ("to sow"), because "they populated the land with scattered settlements".

== Studies ==
Ukrainian historian Mykhailo Hrushevskyi (1866–1934) noted the scholarly view on the matter: Procopius' etymology was rejected as mistaken, and many scholars linked the term with the Serbs; some sought a connection to Ptolemy's Serboi, but "these Serboi lived far to the east, in the Volga region". He noted that the Slavic Serbs appear in historical records in the 9th century, and Serbs may have had a broader sense as suggested by two completely distinct Slavic peoples (Balkan Serbs and Lusatian Sorbs), however, according to him, identical names occurred frequently among the Slavs and "[Early] Slavs may not even have had their own common name to designate nationality. Such names often emerged only with time.".

According to Czech historian Francis Dvornik (1893–1975), the Sporoi were probably the Spali mentioned by Jordanes (fl. 551) and Spalei mentioned by Pliny the Elder (fl. 77–79). According to the North American Society for Serbian Studies, rather than connecting the ethnonym to the poorly known Spali, it was more likely, as per the old view, a Greek rendering of the name Sorpoi or Sorboi, connected to the Serbs.

According to British archaeologist Paul M. Barford, writing in 2001, it most likely derived from the Proto-Slavic word for "multitude" (sporъ, whence Polish sporo, etc.).

A connection has also been made with the Zeriuani mentioned by the 9th-century Bavarian Geographer. It states that the Zeriuani "which is so great a realm that from it, as their tradition relates, all the tribes of the Slavs are sprung and trace their origin" (Zeriuani tantum est regnum, ut ex eo cunctae gentes Sclavorum exortae sint, et originem, sicut affirmant, ducant).

=== Other ancient views on the Slavs ===
In contrast to Procopius, the Roman bureaucrat Jordanes wrote about the Slavs in his work Getica (551): "although they derive from one nation, now they are known under three names, the Veneti, Antes and Sclaveni" (ab unastirpe exorti, tria nomina ediderunt, id est Veneti, Antes, Sclaveni); that is, the West Slavs, East Slavs, and South Slavs. He stated that the Veneti were the ancestors of the Sclaveni and the Antes, the two having used to be called Veneti but are now "chiefly" called Sclaveni and Antes.

== See also ==
- Slavs (ethnonym)
