= Ludwig Albrecht Gebhardi =

German historian (1735–1802)

Ludwig Albrecht Gebhardi (pronounced [gεpha'rdi]; Lüneburg, 13 April 1735 – Hannover, 26 October 1802) was a German historian. He is the author of numerous works dealing in particular with the history of Denmark, Norway, Hungary and the Slavic States, including Serbia.

== Biography ==
Son of the historian and genealogist Johann Ludwig Levin Gebhardi (1699–1764), he studied at the Michaelis school in Lüneburg, then at the University of Göttingen. After schooling in his hometown and Göttingen, he became a professor at the Academy in Lüneburg in 1765, a member of the Göttingen Academy of Sciences in 1785, and in 1799 an archivist, librarian and court historian in Hanover, the capital of the State of the Holy Roman Empire.

He studied and researched the history of northern and eastern European nations, and of his works, the History of the Kingdoms of Serbia, Raška, Bosnia and Rama (Geschichte der Königreiche Servien, Raszien, Bosnien und Rama, 1781) is important for Croatian history. countries on the basis of published original material and literature (with an appendix on the history of the free state of Dubrovnik). The work first appeared as the third volume of the History of the Kingdom of Hungary and Related States (Geschichte des Reichs Hungarn und der damit verbundenen Staaten) in the synthetic series General History of the World (Allgemeine Weltgeschichte) and was later published under the title History of the Kingdoms of Dalmatia, Croatia and Slavonia. Serbia, Raška, Bosnia, Rama and the free state of Dubrovnik (History of the Königreiche Dalmatien, Kroatien, Szlavonien, Servien, Raszien, Bosnien, Rama und des Freystaats Ragusa, 1805). He also wrote the Genealogical History of the Hereditary State Estates in Germany (Genealogische Geschichte der erblichen Reichsstände in Deutschland, I – III, 1776–1785).

== See also ==
- Göttingen school of history
