= Genetic studies on Bulgarians =

DNA analysis of Bulgarian populations

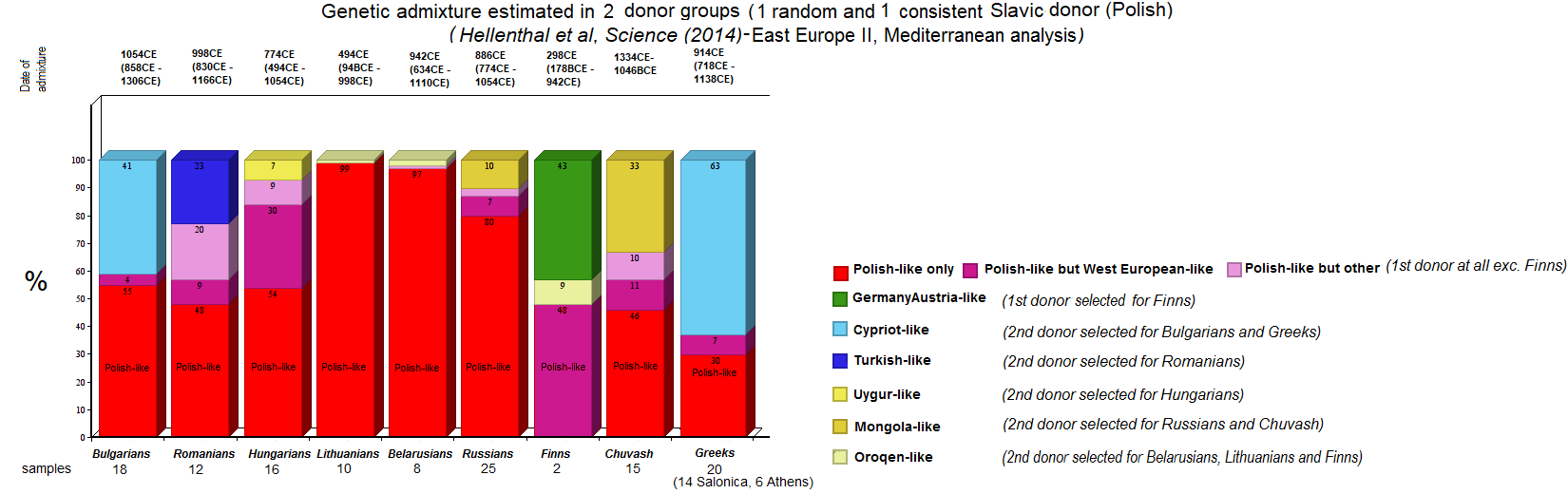
Historical contribution of donor source groups in European peoples according to Hellenthal et al., (2014). Polish is selected to represent Slavic-speaking donor groups from the Middle Ages that are estimated to make up 97% of the ancestry in Belarusians, 80% in Russians, 55% in Bulgarians, 54% in Hungarians, 48% in Romanians, 46% in Chuvash and 30% in Greeks.

The Bulgarians are part of the Slavic ethnolinguistic group as a result of migrations of Slavic tribes to the region since the 6th century AD and the subsequent linguistic assimilation of other populations.

Hellenthal et al., 2014 estimated from data of 94 modern populations a couple of analyses on Bulgarians inferred from an admixture event in 1000-1600 YBP between a Slavic and a Cypriot donor group: to a Polish donor group Bulgarians are of an estimated 59% Polish-like and 41% Cypriot-like admixture; to a Belarusian, Bulgarians are of 46% Belarusian-like and 54% Cypriot-like admixture. Early gene flows between southeastern and eastern Europe make it difficult to obtain a correct estimate, although young enough identical by descent segments confirmed such connection and that the East and West Slavs share more identical by descent segments with South Slavs than with Greeks, inter-Slavic populations (a group of Romanians, Gagauz), but less with Balts, while the South Slavs share similar number with East and West Slavs, but fewer with Greeks.

The phenomenon of distinct genetic substrata in the West, East, and South Slavs would imply several mechanisms, including cultural assimilation of indigenous populations by bearers of Slavic languages as a major mechanism of the spread of Slavic languages to the Balkan Peninsula. About 56% of the Bulgarian autosomal genetic ancestry is derived from Medieval Central and Eastern European populations, genetically related to present-day Eastern European populations, including Slavic-speaking populations. This substantial Medieval Central and Eastern European contribution reflects population movements and admixture into the Balkans during the Early Medieval period and represents the largest identifiable ancestral component in present-day Bulgarians as shown in the study conducted by Sarno et al., 2025 published in the American Journal of Biological Anthropology.

Around 4% of Bulgarian genes are derived outside of Europe and the Middle East or are of undetermined origin (by 858 CE), of which 2.3% are from Northeast Asia and correspond to Asian tribes such as Bulgars, a consistent very low frequency for Eastern Europe as far as Uralic-speaking Hungarians.

== Y-DNA ==
The national groups of Eastern Europe are characterized by dominant haplogroups R1a or I2, while those of Western Europe are characterized by dominant haplogroups R1b or I1, and by other dominant haplogroups in Europe are characterized Albanians, Finns, Greeks, and Turks, and over 50% of the total pool of each European nation other than the latter consists of these 4 haplogroups. A consistent pattern of both all national and regional groups of Bulgarians and Balto-Slavs is that their sum of haplogroups R1a and I2 is always larger than their sum of R1b and I1, while this ratio is vice versa in the Europeans not native to the Post-Eastern Bloc. Bulgarians, as some of their neighbours show the highest diversity of haplogroups in Europe, marked by significant (> 10%) frequencies of 5 major haplogroups. Most Bulgarians belong to three unrelated haplogroups, 20% of whom to I-M423 (I2a1b), 18% to E-V13 (E1b1b1a1b1a) and 17% to R-Z282 (R1a1ab1), but the biggest part belongs to macro-haplgoroup R (~28%). The major haplogroups, grouped by age of around 20 kya, are:

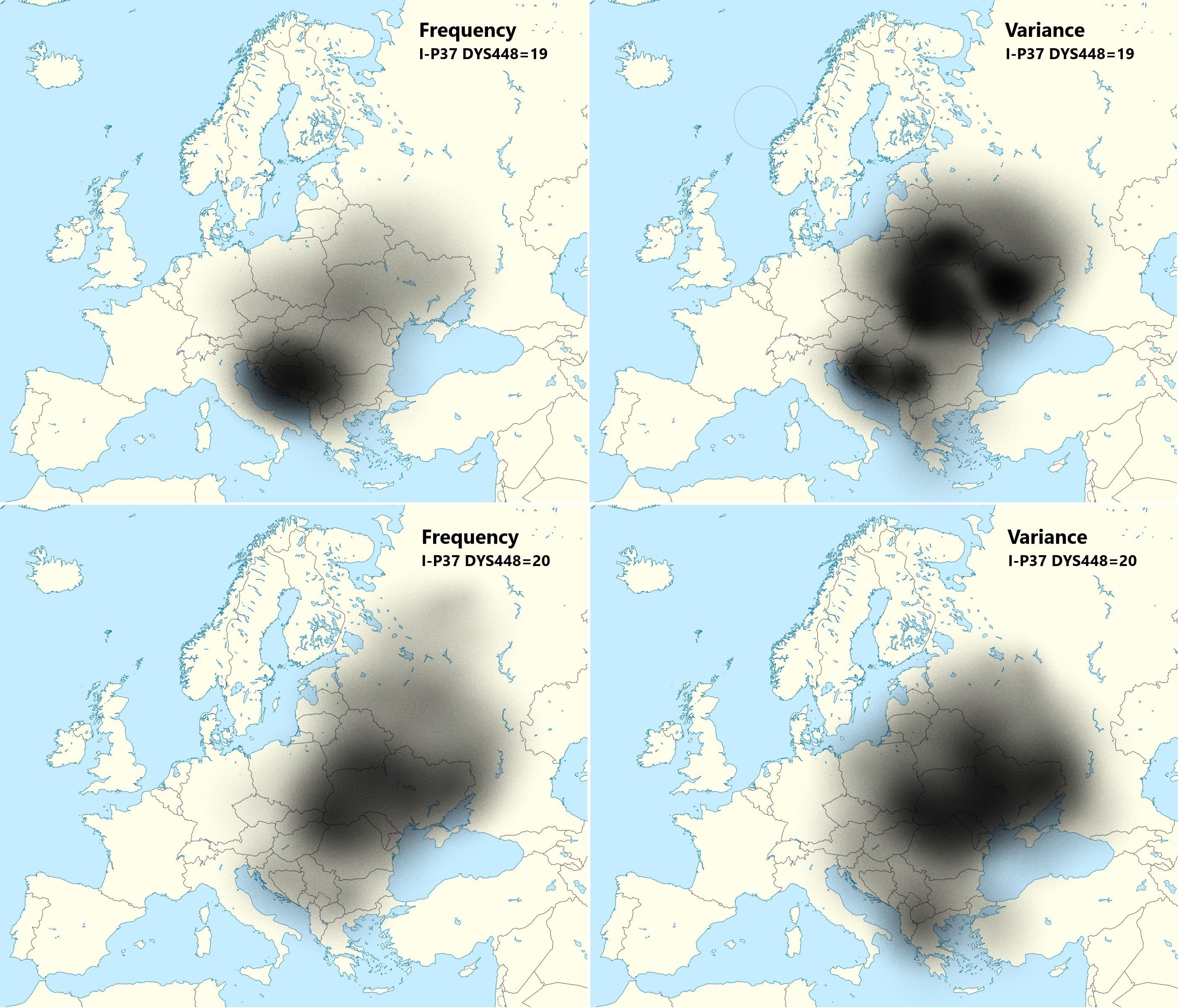
The approximate frequency and variance distribution of haplogroup I-P37 clusters, ancestral "Dnieper-Carpathian" (DYS448=20) and derived "Balkan" (DYS448=19: represented by a single SNP I-PH908), in Eastern Europe per O.M. Utevska (2017).

- Haplogroup I-L460 (I2a) is presented at levels 21.9% according to 808 Bulgarian male samples of the largest-scale study from 2013. By higher levels are defined the profiles of Ukrainians and all South Slavs other than Slovenians. Evidence points to European origin for macro-haplogroup I, and Levantine for its immediate ancestor- IJ. Its exclusive and now patchy distribution within Europe suggested a very early entry in to Europe during Palaeolithic colonization, which was confirmed by the lack of its ancient DNA outside of the continent and ~13,000 years old European Cro-Magnon remains belonging to I2a. I2a2 is the most frequent haplogroup of European male remains dated to the Metal Ages, while I2a1 and I2a1b are most common in the Mesolithic. as such they were the primary haplogroups of pre-historic European hunter-gatherers. Initially a Holocene expansion of I2a in Southeastern Europe is supposed; however Dinaric is descended by several 'only child' sublclades and it is suggested that its most recent common ancestor is aged only 2200 years making it the youngest and most common micro-group.

I2a is recorded to be the dominant haplogroup in the former Sofia-city, Sofia, Plovdiv and Varna province between 23-33%, dropping under 10% in central Bulgaria. Bulgarian Hg I2a most often belongs specifically to the P37.2, M423 branch ("Hg I2a1b"), representing 20% of Bulgarian males, the rest ~2% of Bulgarian males belong to the subclade M223 (I2a2a).It makes up an absolute majority among the tallest populations. Many authors claim that the higher ratio of I2a1b over R1a that is observed in the Balkans today was present before the Slavic expansion, owed to indigenous tribes, while the most recent common ancestor of I-Y3120, to which all Bulgarian lines of I-P37 belong, is 2100 years old and challenges this suggestion. Although older research considered that the high frequency of this subclade in the South Slavic-speaking populations to be the result of "pre-Slavic" paleolithic settlement in the region, the research by O.M. Utevska (2017) confirmed that the haplogroup STR haplotypes have the highest diversity in Ukraine, with ancestral STR marker result "DYS448=20" comprising "Dnieper-Carpathian" cluster, while younger derived result "DYS448=19" comprising the "Balkan cluster" which is predominant among the South Slavs. This "Balkan cluster" also has the highest variance in Ukraine, which indicates that the very high frequency in the Western Balkan is because of a founder effect. Utevska calculated that the STR cluster divergence and its secondary expansion from the middle reaches of the Dnieper river or from Eastern Carpathians towards the Balkan peninsula happened approximately 2,860 ± 730 years ago, relating it to the times before Slavs, but much after the decline of the Cucuteni–Trypillia culture. More specifically, the "Balkan cluster" is represented by a single SNP, I-PH908, known as I2a1a2b1a1a1c in ISOGG phylogenetic tree (2019), and according to YFull YTree it formed and had TMRCA approximately 1,850-1,700 YBP (2nd-3rd century AD). Although it is dominant among the modern Slavic peoples on the territory of the former Balkan provinces of the Roman Empire, until now it was not found among the samples from the Roman period and is almost absent in contemporary population of Italy. It was found in the skeletal remains with artifacts, indicating leaders, of Hungarian conquerors of the Carpathian Basin from the 9th century, part of Western Eurasian-Slavic component of the Hungarians. According to Pamjav et al. (2019) and Fóthi et al. (2020), the distribution of ancestral subclades like of I-CTS10228 among contemporary carriers indicates a rapid expansion from Southeastern Poland, is mainly related to the Slavs and their medieval migration, and the "largest demographic explosion occurred in the Balkans".

- Haplogroup E-V68 (E1b1b1a) is presented at levels 19.6% per 808 samples. The ultimate origin of E-V68 points to northeastern Africa, specifically near the Nile and Lake Alexandria. Thus this haplogroup represents a more recent Bronze Age "out of Africa" movement into Europe via the Balkans. The macro-haplogroup E still prevails in most of the African continent, but through the long-term migrations the sub-Saharian maternal lineage Hg L was lost lacking completely in the Balkans. Holocene movement into the Near East is proposed, then several thousand years ago, a movement into the Balkans. All V68-positive Bulgarians belong to its M78 subclade, which is the prevailing haplogroup in most of northeast Africa and around the Balkans. The presently mostly European V13 (E1b1b1a1b1a) originated in western Asia according to the most plausible scenario and is presented at ~18% among Bulgarian males. Recent findings of V13 in a Neolithic context in Iberia (dated to ~ 7 kya) give a terminus ante quem. However, it might have really begun to expand in the Balkans somewhat later, perhaps during the population growth of the Bronze Age. It resulted to be the dominant haplogroup in the former Burgas, Lovech, Montana and Razgrad province, from 20% to 38%. Like I-P37 above, it is rather limited to Europe but peaks in the Balkans, only for the Albanians, Greeks, Macedonians, various Romani, Montenegrins, Serbs and Romanians are recorded higher levels than Bulgarians. It has been detected on ancient Thracian remain from Bulgaria. An odd low frequency of Haplogroup E of 10% is recorded in the capital Sofia, which is the lowest on the Balkan Peninsula after Croatia and the same level is observed as far as Berlin.
- Haplogroup R-M420 (R1a) is identified at 17.6% per 808 samples. It is the dominant group among most Slavs, Balts and Hungarians. The overall evidence suggests that the macro-haplogroup R arose in southern or central Asia descending from Haplogroup IJK. The subsequent path into Europe, and the major settlement is thought to have happened in the Bronze Age by the Kurgan hypothesis, R1a and R1b clades are found at minority levels in Europe since the Mesolithic. It has been revealed that the R1a branch Z282 that is limited to Eastern Europe and separated from their Asian relative ~5000 years ago, makes up 96% of Bulgarian R1a, while the most common branch from China to Anatolia (Z93) makes up the rest 4%. As such, the R1a frequency may only be the result of ultimate descendants of ancient eastern European tribes, namely Balto-Slavs, who are the early Slavs and possibly the Thracians. Divided by the largest branches, per 880 samples the levels of the branches of R1a are - M458 - 7.4%, CTS1211(Z280) - 7.1%, Z92(Z280) - 1.9% and Z93 - only 0.7%. According to 100 samples M458 carriers constitute 56% of Bulgarian R1a carriers. The Z92 component of the Bulgarians is also much lower than that of the East Slavs and more similar to that of the West. All branches are consistently outnumbered by M458 throughout whole eastern and central Bulgaria. M458 is the dominant R1a clade in the regions roughly corresponding to the area of Bulgarian dialects that share most similarities with Polish dialects, the eastern dialects and the Slavic dialects in Greece. R1a with a prevailing M458 (17%) component makes up the majority in the former Haskovo province with the highest frequency on the Balkan Peninsula (29%), while in the former Montana province it is dominant(23%) with dominant Z280 (19%) component and a drastical drop of the ratio of M458 in the northwest is observed. Deeply traced data reveals that 90% of the sampled Bulgarian carriers of the M458 clade are carriers of the L1029 micro-clade (R1a1a1b1a1b1), which is 2–3,000 years old, and the L1029 clade of M458 alone accounts for 50% of all Bulgarian R1a per ~250 samples. Some of the phenomena that distinguish western and eastern subgroups of the South Slavic people and languages can be explained by two separate migratory streams of different tribal groups of the future South Slavs via both: the west and east of the Carpathian Mountains., the western Balkans was settled with Sclaveni, the east with Antes, and the haplogroup of the Serbo-Croat group is mainly constituted by R1a-L1280 or R1a-CTS3402, while the Macedono-Bulgarian is exclusively made up of the R1a-L1029. R1a of the Bulgarians is for the most part descended likely from the Polesye area because L1029 clade is entirely constituted of two 2100 years old subclades YP417 and YP263, which in turn make up most L1029 in Belarus and Ukraine but not in Poland.
- Haplogroup R-M343 (R1b): present in Bulgarians at 10.7%. R1b is the most frequently occurring haplogroup around Ural and Chad, in most of western Europe and the adjacent islands. A Balkan entry of R1b into Europe is a major theory. The Bulgarian internal structure is heterogeneous and 4% of Bulgarian males carry western European subclades. 3% are carriers of the 'Italo-Atlantic' Proto-Celtic branch P312, of which 2% of U152. Another 1 percent belongs to the U106 branch that corresponds with the spread of Germanic peoples. The ancestral L23 and Z2103 branch show a clear relationship with Anatolia and the Near East. The branch turned to be the dominant clade of the Yamna culture in far eastern Europe. In addition to the Middle East it is currently the dominant clade of R1b there in parts of central and east Europe. The Bulgarian STR markers are closest to the Romanian.
- Haplogroup J-M172 (J2) is presented at levels 10.5%. Higher levels of it are found as far as Hungarians, Romanians, Bosniaks, Austrians and Italians, while Anatolia and the surroundings are dominated by the group. Whilst its origin is north Levantine, its current pattern reflects more recent events connecting the Aegean and western Anatolia during the Copper and Bronze Ages, as well as Greek and Phoenician colonization around the Mediterranean. Several subclades within J2 are present: J-M410 (J2a) is represented at 6%, Balkan J-M12 (J2b) at 4% up to 11% in Burgas(prevailing).
- Haplogroup G-M201 (G2a) at 4,9%. Ancient G-M201s with sequencing Haplogroup G2a (G-P15) has been identified in Neolithic human remains in Europe dating between 5000 and 3000 BC. Furthermore, the majority of all the male skeletons from the European Neolithic period have so far yielded Y-DNA belonging to this haplogroup. The oldest skeletons confirmed by ancient DNA testing as carrying haplogroup G2a were five found in the Avellaner cave burial site in Catalonia, Spain and were dated by radiocarbon dating to about 5000 BCE.
- Haplogroup I-M253 (I1) at 4,3% of which L22, Z58 and Z63. According to a study published in 2010, I-M253 originated between 3,170 and 5,000 years ago, in Chalcolithic Europe. A 2015 study in Hungary uncovered remains of two individuals from the Linear Pottery culture, one of whom was found to have carried the M253 SNP which defines Haplogroup I1. This culture is thought to have been present between 7,500 and 6,500 years ago.
- Finally, there are also some other Y-DNA Haplogroups presented at a lower levels among Bulgarians ~ 10% all together, as J-M267 (J1) at ~3.5%, E-M34 (E1b1b1b2a1) at ~2%, T-M70 (T1a) at ~1.5%, at less than 1% Haplogroup C-M217 (C2), H-M82 (H1a1), N-M231 (N), Q-M242 (Q), L-M61 (L), I-M170 (I*), E-M96 (E*) excl. M35, R-M124 (R2a), E-M81. (E1b1b1b1a), E-M35 (E1b1b1*).

Haplogroup frequencies of Bulgarians

Province	samples	C2 (%)	E1b1b1a (%)	E1b1b1b (%)	E1b1b1c (%)	E* (%)	G2a (%)	H1a1a (%)	I1 (%)	I2a (%)	I2c (%)	J1 (%)	J2 (%)	L (%)	N (%)	Q (%)	R1a (%)	R1b (%)	R2 (%)	T1a (%)
Province	samples	M217	M78	M81	M34	M96	P15	M82	M253	L460	M170	M267	M172	M61	M231	M242	M420	M343	M124	M70
Burgas	45		20.0		4.4	2.2	4.4			15.6		6.7	17.8				11.1	17.8		
Haskovo	41		29.3	2.4					2.4	7.3		2.4	9.8				29.3	14.6		2.4
Lovech	62		24.2			1.6	4.8		3.2	16.1		3.2	17.7	1.6		1.6	19.4	4.8		1.6
Montana	80	1.2	23.7		2.5		3.7		6.2	18.7		5.0	7.5			1.2	22.5	6.2		1.2
Plovdiv	159		20.8		2.5	0.6	3.8	0.6	5.7	22.6	1.3	1.9	9.4		0.6	0.6	16.4	11.9		1.3
Sofia City	59		8.5		1.7		3.4	3.4	3.4	27.1	1.7	6.8	8.5				20.3	13.6		1.7
Sofia Province	257	0.8	17.1		1.9		6.6	0.4	4.3	25.3		3.9	10.9		0.4	0.4	17.5	9.3	0.4	0.8
Razgrad	21		38.1				14.3			9.5			9.5				9.5	14.3		4.8
Varna	15		20.0			6.7			6.7	33.3			6.7				13.3	13.3		
unknown	69	1.4	14.5		1.4		5.8	1.4	5.8	26.1			7.2	1.4	2.9		11.6	14.5		5.8
Total	808	0.5	19.6% (158/808)	0.1	1.9	0.5	4.9	0.6	4.3	21.9% (177/808)	0.4	3.3	10.5% (85/808)	0.2	0.5	0.5	17.6% (142/808)	10.9% (88/808)	0.1	1.6

A phylogenetic analysis determines that the population of Haskovo Province has shorter genetic distance against the population of the Czech Republic than to the Bulgarian provinces, and that only the population of Burgas Province is closer to Haskovo than the Hungarian population, furthermore only datasets of two more Balkan or Slavic foreign populations(Greece and Croatia) are used and all other Slavic populations are excluded from this analysis. The largest-scale study of the Hungarians (n=230) determined that the remaining Finno-Urgic peoples are genetically their furthest populations, and clearly confirmed that the closest Europeans to the Hungarians are the Bulgarians, however the same study determines the Yugoslavs as the nearest population to Bulgarians. According to DNA data for 17 Y-chromosomal STR loci in Macedonians, the Macedonian population has the lowest genetic distance against the Bulgarian population (0.0815).

According to an older study of 127 Bulgarian males, frequencies are the following: 30% R (17% R1a, 11% R1b, 2% R*); 27.5% I; 20% E; 18% J; 1.5% G; 1.5% H; 1% T.

According to another study involving 126 Bulgarian males, frequencies are the following: 30% I (25.5% I2a, 4% I1); 20,5% E; 17.5% R (R1b 11%, R1a 6%); 17.5% J (16% J2); 5.5% G; 4% Q; 1% L; 1% T; unknown 3%.

According to another study involving 100 Bulgarian males, frequencies are the following: 34% I (29% I2a, 3% I1); 30% R (16% R1a, 14% R1b); 21% E (20% E1b1b1a); 9% J; 2% G; 2% T; 1% N.

== mtDNA ==
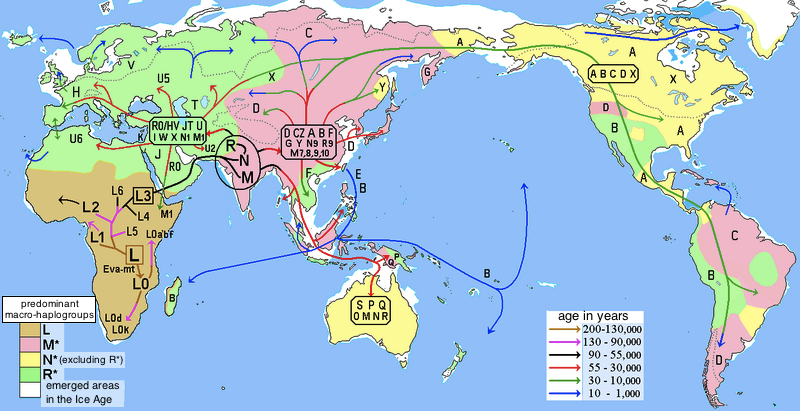
Prevailing mtDNA hgs

Complementary evidence exists from mtDNA data. Bulgaria shows a very similar profile to other European countries – dominated by mitochondrial haplogroups Hg H (~42%), Hg U (~18%), Hg J/Hg T (~18%), and Hg K (~6%). Like most Europeans, H1 is the prevailing subclade among Bulgarians. Most of the U-carriers belong to U5 and U4. The distribution of the subclades of Haplogroup H have not been revealed. Recent studies show greater diversity within mt Haplogroups than once thought, as sub-haplogroups are being discovered, and often separate migrations and distributions of the Y-DNA haplogroups. While the Y-DNA variation in Europe is clinal, the mitochondrial is not.

MtDNA haplgroups of ~1000 Bulgarians:

- HV - 49%
  - H - 41%
    - H5 - 3%
  - HV - 4%
  - HV0 - 4%
- U - 18%
  - U1 - 1%
  - U2e - 1%
  - U3 - 2%
  - U4 - 4%
  - U5 - 8%
    - U5a - 5%
    - U5b - 3%
  - U6 - 0%
  - U7 - 1%
  - U8 - <1%
- JT - 18%
- K - 6%
- N - 5%
  - N1 - 3%
  - N2 - 2%
- X - 2%
- M - 1%
- L - <1%
- R0a - <1%
- Others - <1%

== auDNA and overall ==
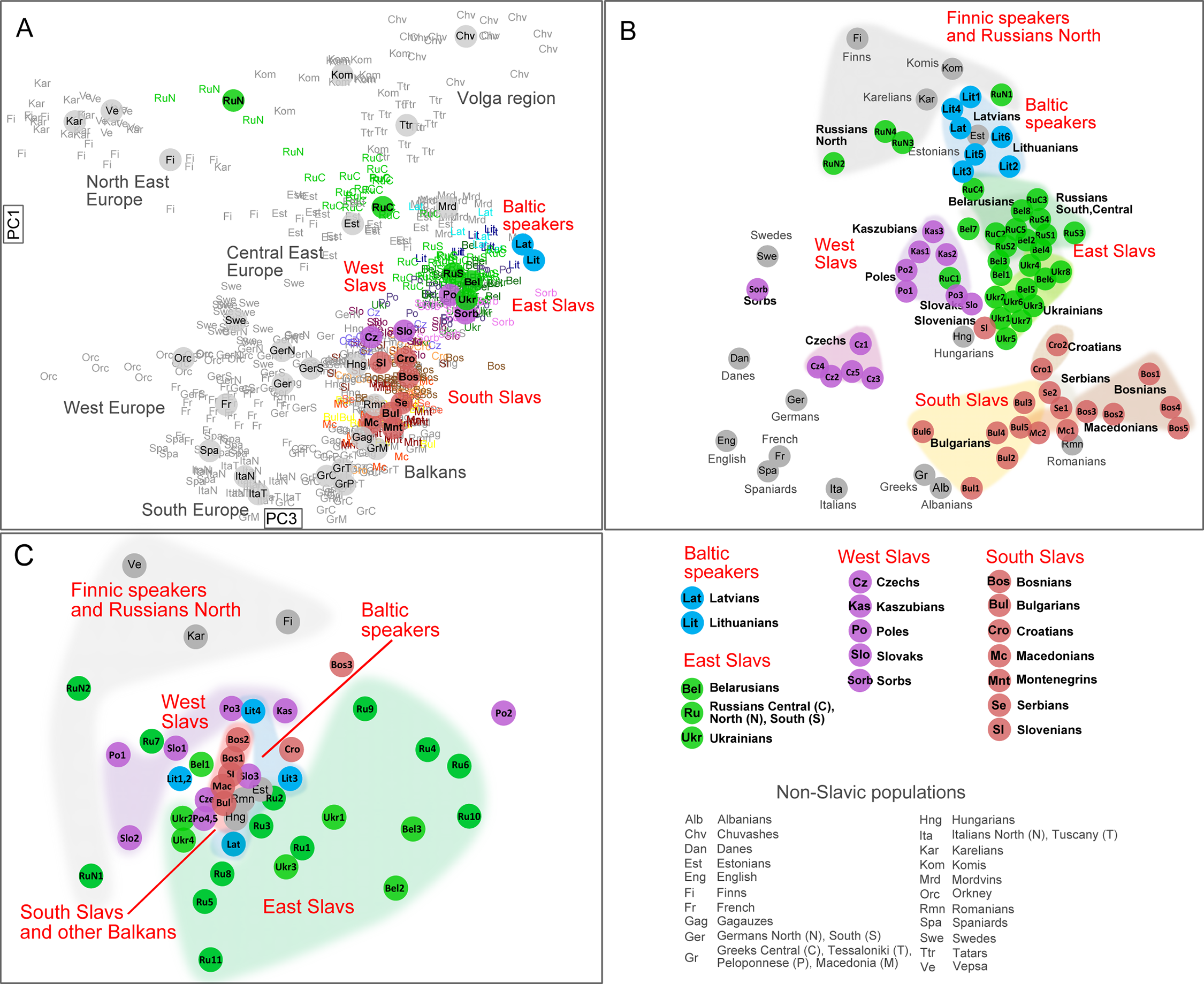
Balto-Slavic comparison by A (autosomal DNA), B (Y-DNA) and C (mtDNA plot).

Whilst haploid markers such as mtDNA and Y-DNA can provide clues about past population history, they only represent a single genetic locus, compared to hundreds of thousands present in nuclear, autosomes. Although autosomal analyses often sample a small number of Bulgarians, by multiple autosomes multiple ancestral lines may be traced by an individual's 21 autosomes as opposed to one identical mtDNA or Y-DNA sex chromosome, whose inheritance although clinal, demonstrates genetic drift often in statistics. Analyses of autosomal DNA markers gives the best approximation of overall 'relatedness' between populations, presenting a less skewed genetic picture compared to Y-DNA haplogroups. This auDNA data shows that there are no sharp discontinuities or clusters within the European population. Rather there exists a genetic gradient, running mostly in a southeast to northwest direction.

A study compared all Slavic nations and combined all lines of evidence, autosomal, maternal and paternal, including more than 6000 people for and at least 700 Bulgarians from previous studies, of which 13 were used for autosomal analysis (right image). The overall data situates the southeastern group (Bulgarians and Macedonians) in a cluster with Romanians, and they are at similar proximity to Gagauzes, Montenegrins and Serbs who are not part of another cluster but are described as 'in between' clusters. Macedonians and Romanians consistently appear to be among the most related to Bulgarians by au, mt, and Y-DNA a conclusion backed also by a pan-European autosomal study investigating 500,568 SNP (loci) of 1,387 Europeans and including 1 or 2 Bulgarians, other more or less extensive data sets situate Bulgarians and Romanians as their nearest.

Per HLA-DRB1 allele frequencies Bulgarians are also in a cluster with the same populations. The Balto-Slavic study itself calculated genetic distance by SNP data of the multiple autosomes and ranked most proximal to Bulgarians the Serbs, followed by Macedonians, Montenegrins, Romanians, Gagauzes, Macedonian Greeks apart from Thessaloniki, the rest of the South Slavs, Hungarians, Slovaks, Czechs, and then by Greeks from Thessaloniki, Central Greece and Peloponnese. The East Slavs and Poles cluster together remaining less proximal to Bulgarians than Germans, among whom Slav admixture is also observed. Balts, however, according to the PCA analysis are less proximal to Bulgarians than Italians for example are. Bulgarians are also only modestly close to their eastern neighbours – the Anatolian Turks, suggesting the presence of certain geographic and cultural barriers between them. Despite various invasions of Altaic-speaking peoples in Europe, no significant impact from such Asian descent is recorded throughout southern and central Europe.

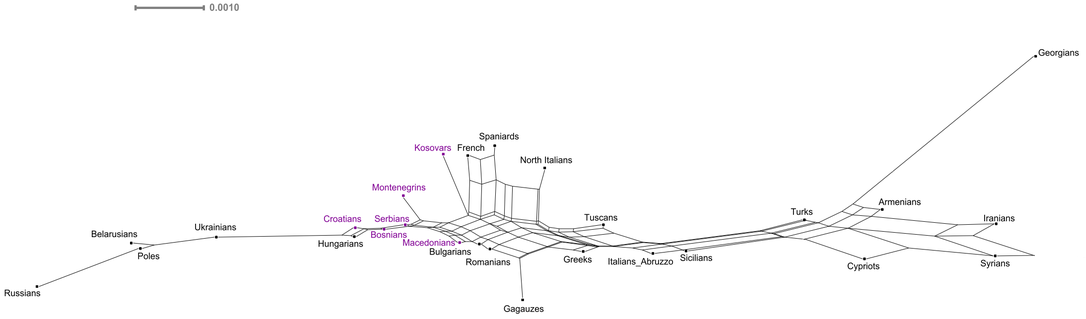
Network of 29 populations constructed with the Neighbor-net approach from FST distances based on the variation of autosomal SNPs.

The study claims that the major part of the Balto-Slavic genetic variation can be primarily attributed to the assimilation of the pre-existing regional genetic components, which differed for present West, East and South Slavic-speaking people. For Slavic peoples correlations with linguistics came out much lower than high correlations with geography. The South Slavic group, despite sharing a common language, is separated and has a largely different genetic past from their northern linguistic relatives. Therefore, for the Bulgarians and most other South Slavs the most plausible explanation would be that their most sizable genetic components were inherited from indigenous Balkan pre-Slavic and pre-Bulgar population. The South Slavs are characterized by featuring NRY hgs I2a and E plus 10% higher Mediterranean k2 autosomal component, while the Eastern and Western Slavs are characterized by the k3 component and hg R1a. The presence of two distinct genetic substrata in the genes of East-West and South Slavs would conclude that assimilation of indigenous populations by bearers of Slavic languages was a major mechanism of the spread of Slavic languages to the Balkan Peninsula.

Southeastern Europeans share large numbers of common ancestors that date roughly to the times of the Slavic expansion around 1,500 years ago. The eastern European populations with high rates of (IBD) are highly coincident with the modern distribution of Slavic languages including Hungary, Romania, Greece and Albania, so it is speculated for Slavic expansion, anyway it was concluded that additional work and methods would be needed to verify this hypothesis. This study detects a considerable connection between Bulgarians and North Slavs that is the result of migrations no earlier than 1500 years ago. A study on genetic admixture filtered to 474,491 autosomal SNPs and including 18 Bulgarians concluded that there is a recent excess of identical by descent sharing in Eastern Europe, and recent period of exchanged segments speculating that this may correspond to the Slavic expansion across this region.

A signal at a low frequency among Balkan Slavs was detected that may have been inherited from the medieval Slavic settlers, but it was confirmed that this issue requires further investigation. The short genetic distance of South Slavs does not extend to populations throughout the whole Balkan Peninsula and they are differentiated from all Greek sub-populations that are not Macedonian Greek. The South Slavs share significantly fewer identical by descent segments for length classes with Greeks than with the group of East-West Slavs. Most of the East-West Slavs share as many such segments with the South Slavs as they share with the inter-Slavic populations between them. This might suggest Slavic gene flow across the wide area and physical boundaries such as the Carpathian Mountains, including Hungarians, Romanians and Gagauz. Notably, the number of common ancestors within the last 1,000 to 2,000 years is particularly high within eastern and Slavic-speaking Europe.

A high number of shared IBD segments among East Europeans that can be dated to around 1,000–2,000 YBP was revealed. The highest percentage of the total number of shared pairwise IBD segments is detected between the group of East-West Slavs and South Slavs (41% from the total number of IBD segments detected); Baltic speakers, Estonians (40%) and "inter-Slavic" Hungarians, Romanians and Gagauz (37%). East-West Slavs share these segments with Western Europeans (32%), Volga region populations (30) and North Caucasus (21%). South Slavs also share 41% with East-West Slavs and 37% with Inter-Slavic populations, they also share 31% with Western Europeans and 30% with Greeks. However, per one pair of individuals East-West Slavs share more IBD with Balts than with South Slavs, but not with the rest and the same amount with inter-Slavic as with South Slavs. Per one pair of individuals South Slavs keep sharing most IBD with East-South Slavs and the same amount with the inter-Slavic, followed by Greeks and Western Europeans.

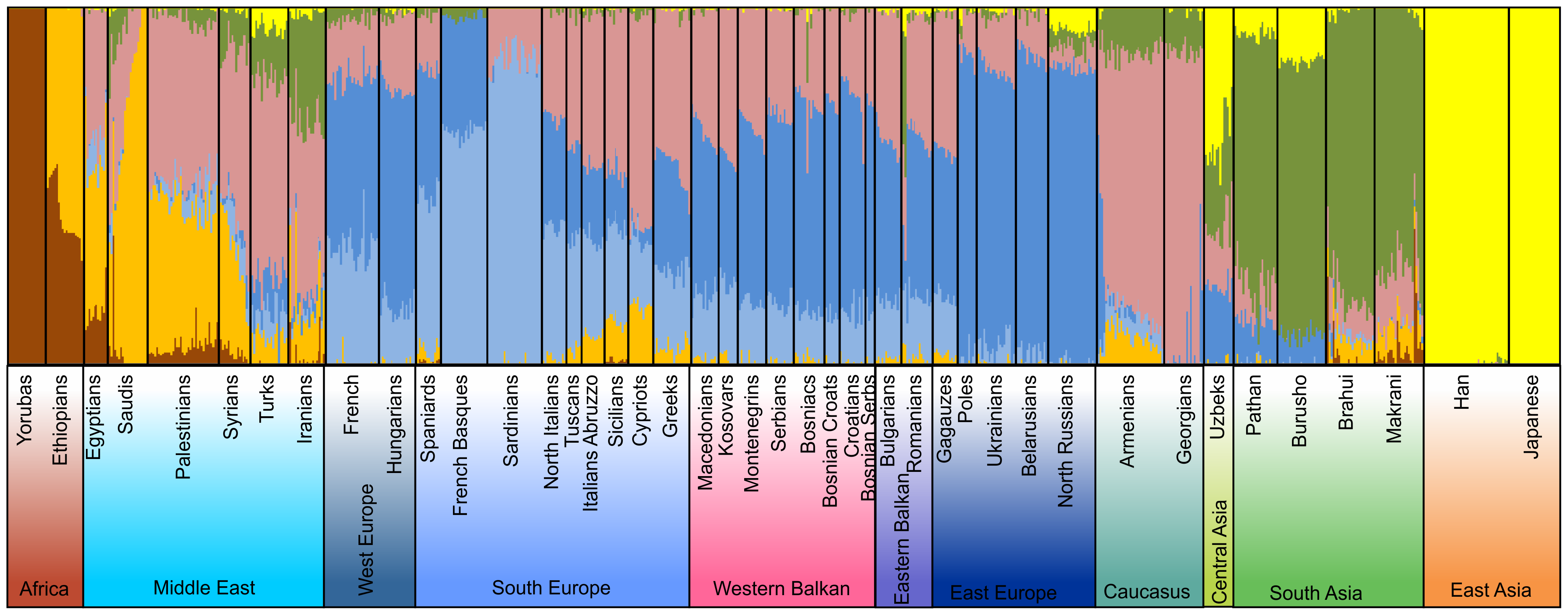
Admixture analysis of autosomal SNPs of the Balkan region in a global context on the resolution level of 7 assumed ancestral populations.

For Bulgarians, the prevailing donor group in admixture, according to Sarno et al. (2025), is a Central and Eastern European group, accounting for approximately 56% of autosomal ancestry and consistent with the medieval Slavic expansion. The admixture is estimated to have occurred during the medieval period. The Slavic-related frequency of Bulgarians is lower than that of Poles and Hungarians, higher than that of Greeks, and roughly the same as that of Romanians. In an older publication by Hellenthal et al., based on a database of 94 modern populations, the authors inferred over 40% of the total autosomal make-up of the Bulgarians to a legacy of the "Slavic (500-900CE)" expansion. The same publication provided the following two analyses on oneway admixture of the Bulgarian autosomal makeup:

1. 46.0% Belarusian-like (including 23.2% Lithuanian, 19.3% Polish, 2.3% Finnish) and 54.0% Cypriot-like (including 14.8% Greek, 12.7% Cypriot, 11.9% Arab, 4.1% Italian, 3.3% Georgian, 2.0% Sardinian, 2.8% Iranian)
2. 59.0% Polish-like (including 54.5% Polish, 4.0% English) and 40.9% Cypriot-like (including 15.3% Cypriot, 14.9% Arab, 3.5% Georgian, 2.4% Sardinian, 1.4% Hezhen, 1.3% Greek).

The genetic diversity among Bulgarians is the reason of more inherited diseases The blood type of 21,568 Bulgarians is 37% A+, 28% 0+, 14% B+, 7% AB+, 6+ A−, 4% 0−, 2% B−, 1% AB−, a distribution similar to Sweden, the Czech Republic and Turkey.

== Ancient DNA ==
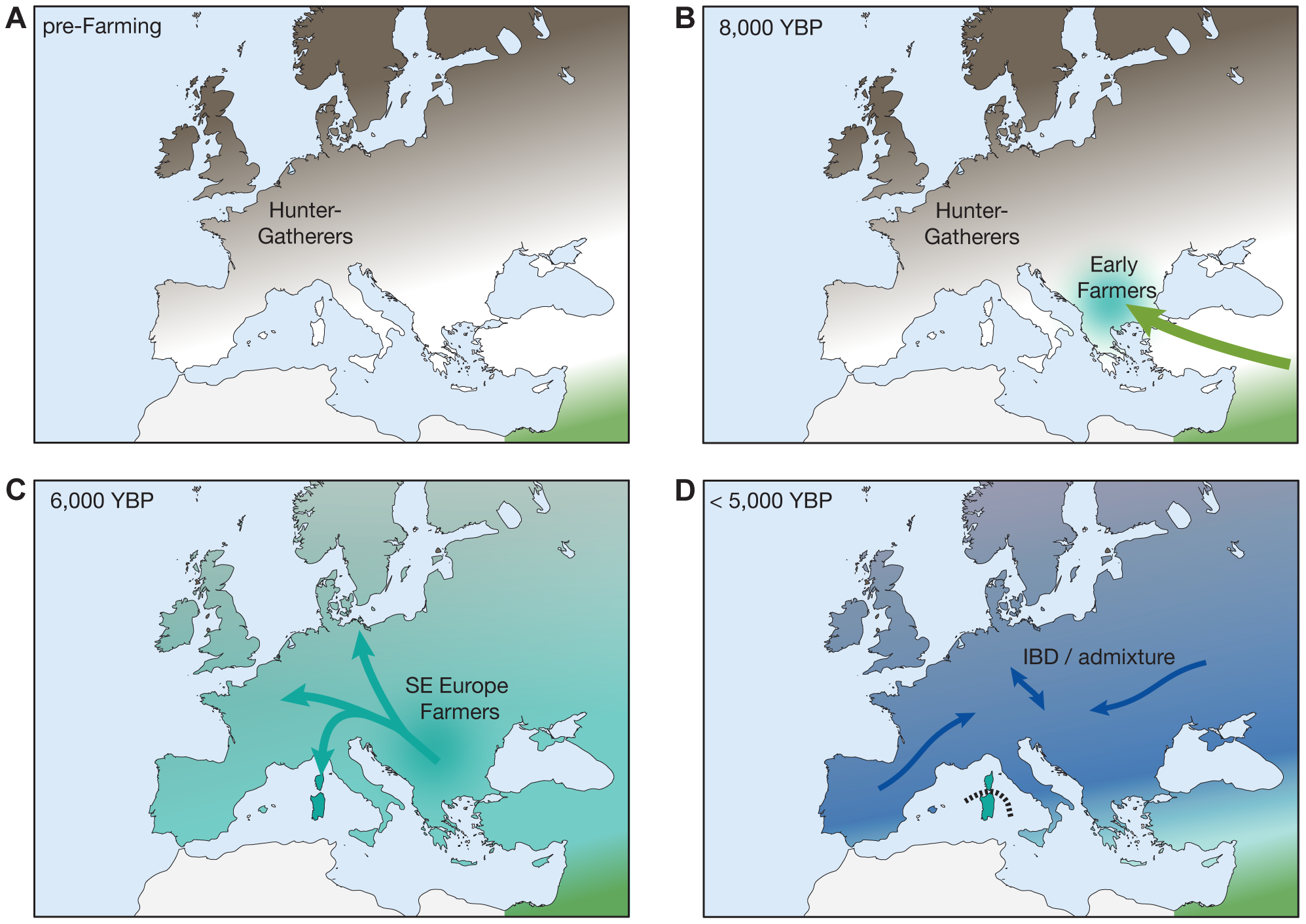
A simplified model for recent demographic history of Europeans. The panels indicate a possible demographic scenario consistent with the observed signals.

Despite the most common haplogroup among Bulgarians being 14000 years old I2a1b at 20%, 8000 years old hunter-gatherer samples of the same haplogroup came out genetically very distant from Bulgarian and Balkan individuals by an autosomal analysis of skeletal remains from Loschbour cave in Luxembourg.

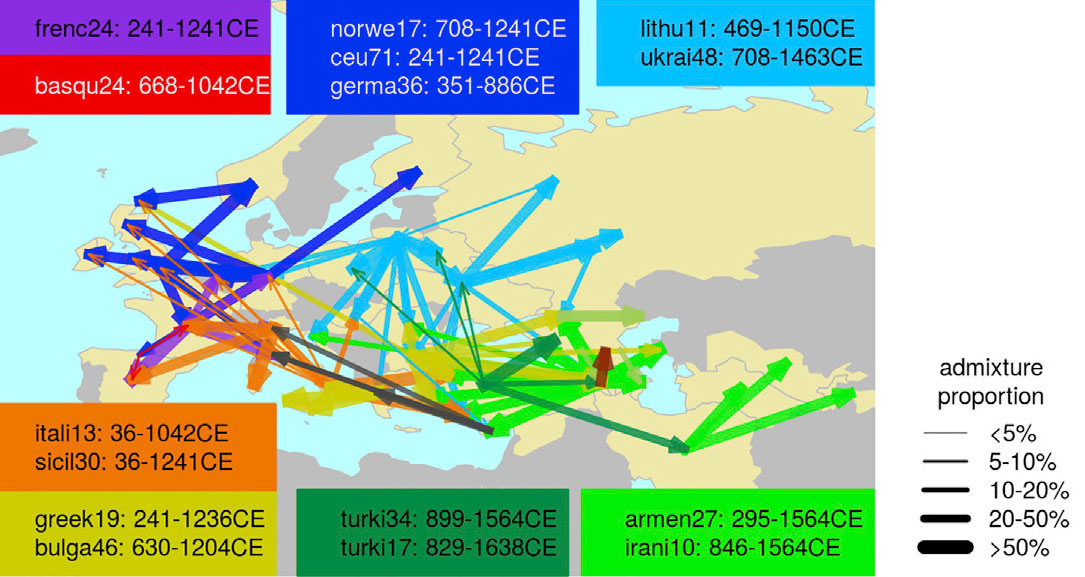
Medieval gene flow within West Eurasia is shown by lines linking the best-matching donor group to the sources of admixture with recipient clusters (arrowhead). Linecolors represent the regional identity of the donor group, and line thickness represents the proportion of DNA coming from the donor group. Ranges of the dates (point estimates) for events involving sources most similar to selected donor groups are shown.

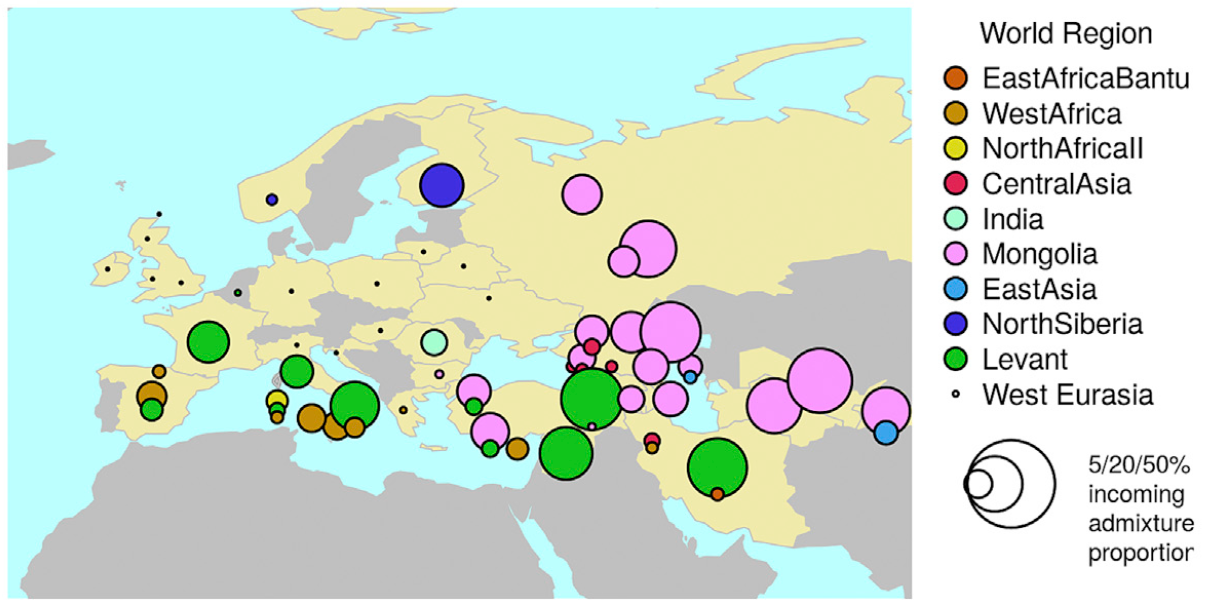
The Impact of Recent Admixture in West Eurasia.

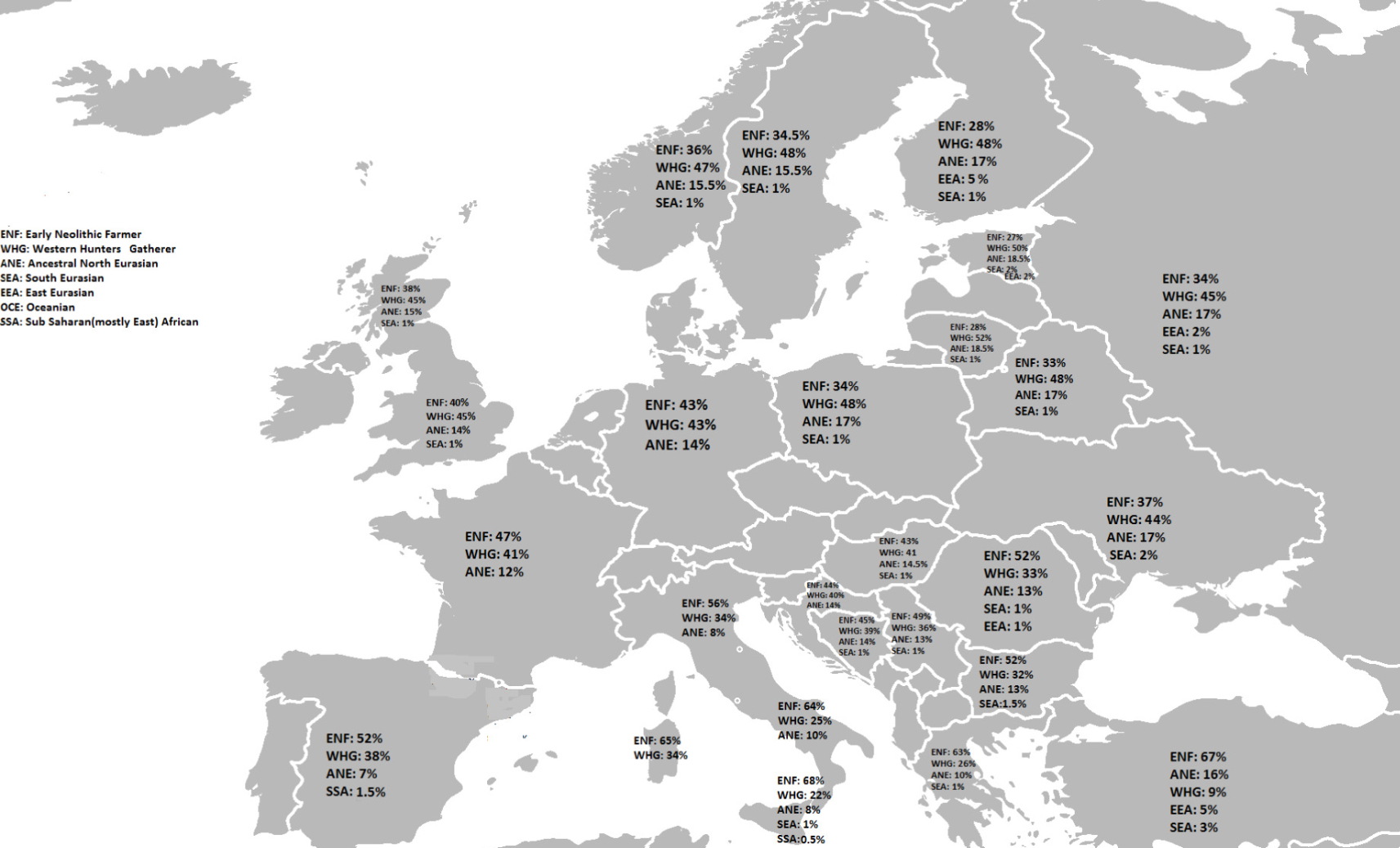
Estimated ancient DNA admixture. Bulgarian: 52% Neolithic farmer (ENF), 32% Western Hunter Gatherer (WHG), 13% Ancestral North Eurasian (ANE).

Computing the frequency of common point mutations of several mtDNA Thracian remains from South-East of Romania with haplogroups H17, H22 and HV has resulted that the Italian (7.9%), the Albanian (6.3%) and the Greek (5.8%) have shown a bias of closer genetic kinship with the Thracian individuals than the Romanian and Bulgarian individuals (4.2%), but it was noted that more mtDNA sequences from Thracian individuals are needed in order to perform a complex objective statistical analysis. From seven Thracian samples aged about 3 millennia from Gabova Mogila and Shekerdja Mogila in Sliven Province, and from Bereketska Mogila in Stara Zagora Province, two were identified as belonging to mtDNA Haplogroup D, presumably associated with East Asia. Haplogroup W5a was found among two individuals and H1an2. H14b1 was also found. Four samples from Iron Age Bulgaria were studied, the official study confirmed only that the two are male and mtDNA of two individuals - U3b for the Svilengrad man and HV for the Stambolovo individual. Haplogroups U for the Krushare man, U2e for the Vratitsa individual have been identified. Those individuals were from Thracian burial sites and are dated at around 450-1500 BC.

20 samples from medieval Bulgarian sites were alleged as originally Bulgar, but there is no evidence for that. They were from a burial site from the Monastery of Mostich in Preslav, Nozharevo, Tuhovishte and most came out European mtDNA haplogroup H, including H1, H1an2, H1r1, H1t1a1, H2a2a1 H5, H13a2c1, H14b1, HV1, J, J1b1a1, T, T2, U4a2b, U4c1 and U3 with the half belonging to Haplogroup H. It was shown a short genetic distance between these samples and modern Bulgarians.

After at least 20 medieval (10-14th century) mtDNA samples from Cedynia and Lednica in Poland, possibly Slavic, had been studied, the 855 sampled modern Bulgarians come out overall the closest group to these samples out of 20 other European nations and moreover, they share the highest value of haplotypes with the medieval Polish population more than any other compared nation does. Those medieval haplogroups included H, H1a, K1, K2, X2, X4, HV, J1b, R0a, HV0, H5a1a, N1b, T1a, J1b and W. The samples came out distant from modern Polish population, but nearest to the modern Bulgarian and Czech population. 20 medieval(9-12th century) samples from Slovak sites Nitra Šindolka and 8 from Čakajovce were compared to modern population and Bulgarians, and Portuguese came out nearest to them by genetic distance, however all these came out distant to modern Slovak population.

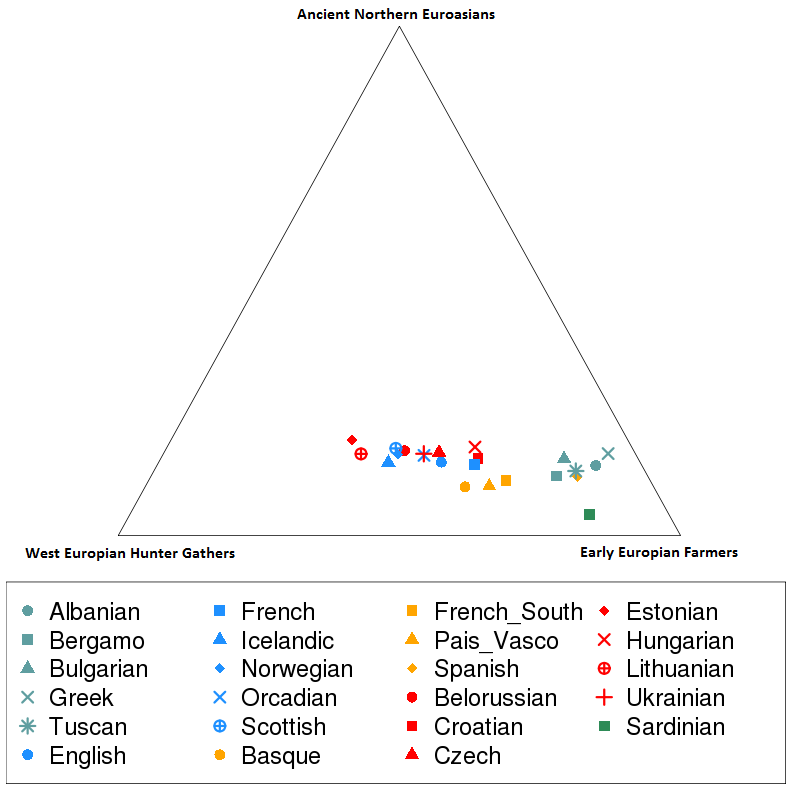
Samples from three prehistoric European ancestor groups compared to modern peoples

Further evidence from ancient DNA, reconsiderations of mutation rates, and collateral evidence from autosomal DNA growth rates suggest that the major period of European population expansion occurred after the Holocene. Thus the current geographic spread and frequency of haplogroups has been continually shaped from the time of Palaeolithic colonization to beyond the Neolithic. This process of genetic shaping continued into recorded history, such as the Slavic migrations.

Recent studies of ancient DNA have revealed that European populations are largely descending from three ancestral groups. The first one are Paleolithic Siberians, the second one are Paleolithic European hunter-gatherers, and the third one are early farmers and later arrivals from the Near East and West Asia. According to this, Bulgarians are predominantly (52%) descending from early Neolithic farmers spreading the agriculture from Anatolia, and from West Asian Bronze Age invaders and cluster together with other Southern Europeans. Another of the admixture signals in that farmers involves some ancestry related to East Asians, with ~ 2% total Bulgarian ancestry proportion linking to a presence of nomadic groups in Europe, from the time of the Huns to that of the Ottomans. A third signal involves admixture between the North European group from one side and the West Asian - Early farmers' group from another side, at approximately the same time as the East Asian admixture, ca. 850 AD. This event may correspond to the expansion of Slavic language speaking people. The analysis documents the hunter-gatherer admixture in Bulgarians at a level from ca. 1/3. The impact of Yamnaya culture is estimated at 20-30%, which is most common among the Slavs.

A later study published by Cell Press in 2023, focused on demographic developments in the Balkan peninsula during the first millennium CE, also examined the DNA of present-day populations from the Balkans, among them Bulgarians. It determined that present-day Bulgarians, like all other populations in the region, were affected by two major processes that took place following the end of the Iron Age:

Firstly, a 19.3±6.6% of their DNA could be traced to the Bulgarian Early Iron Age natives, another 23.8±7.6% from a Roman-era Balkan population with such Eastern Mediterranean ancestry, additionally, a minor contribution from a Bronze-to-Iron Age expansion in the Balkans, associated with Western Anatolia was given as contributing 5.7±2.9% of the present-day Bulgarian genome. Secondly, a demographic process which was found to have already been underway no later than 700 CE, and brought ancestry akin to that of present-day Eastern European Slavic-speaking populations contributed an even more significant component of the present-day Bulgarian genome, making up - according to the aforementioned model - 51.2±2.2% of present-day Bulgarian ancestry. The researchers also found the presence of two other waves of immigrants during the first half of the research period. One is from Central and Northern Europe, and the other from the steppe zone which stretches from the Northern Black Sea region to Kazakhstan. However, traces of these peoples are almost lost after 700 AD and they do not left a serious DNA mark among the Balkan populations of today.

== Paleo DNA ==
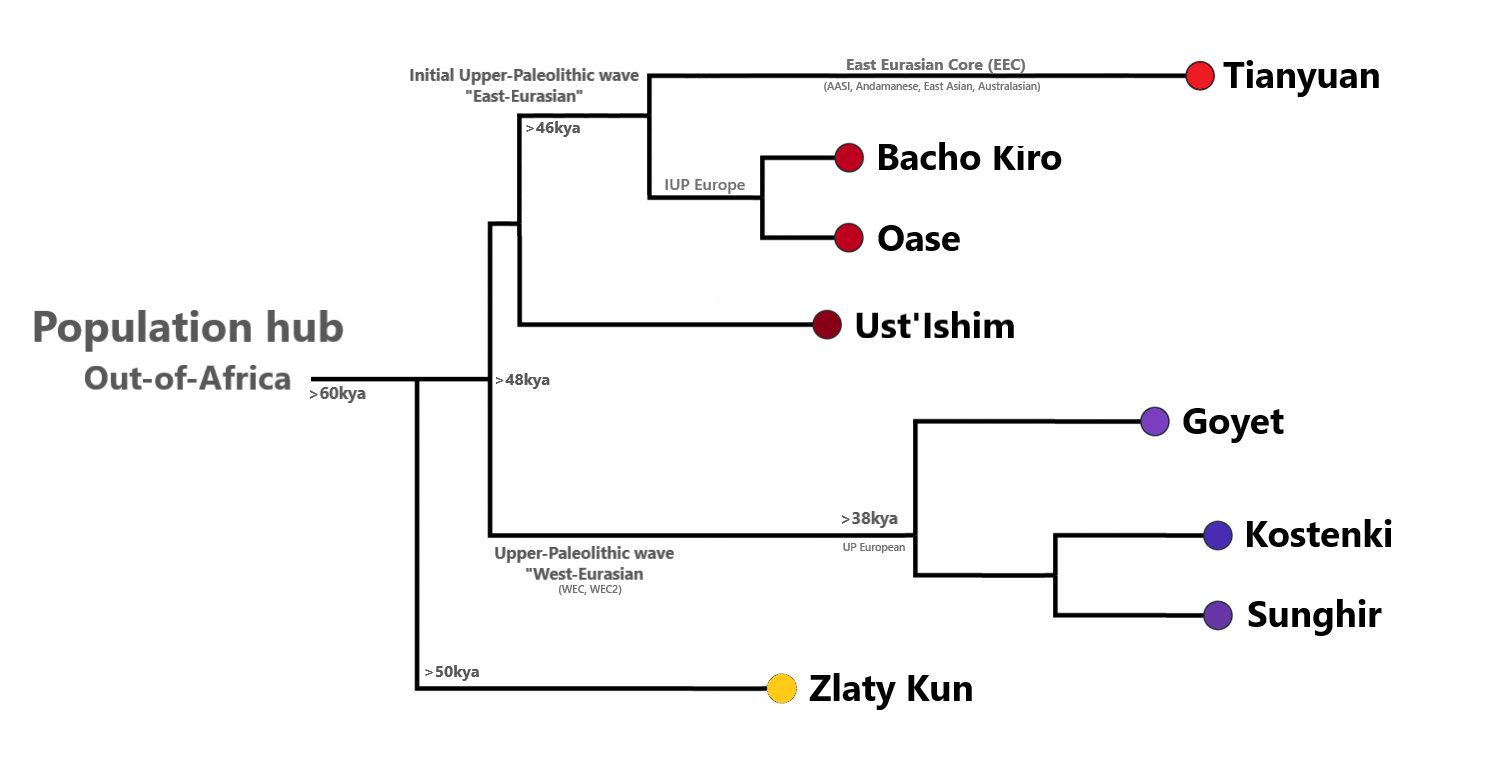
Phylogenetic position of ancient Upper Paleolithic Eurasian specimens.

The Bacho Kiro Cave has yielded the oldest human remains ever to be found in Bulgaria which are unrelated to the modern-day Europeans. At one of the earliest known Aurignacian burials (layer 11), two pierced animal teeth were found and ordered into the distinct Bachokiran artifact assemblage. Radiocarbon dated to over 43,000 years ago, they currently represent the oldest known ornaments in Europe. With an approximate age of 46,000 years, human fossils consist of a pair of fragmented mandibles including at least one molar. Whether these early humans were in fact Homo sapiens or Neanderthals was disputed until morphological analysis of a tooth and mitochondrial DNA of bone fragments established that remains were those of Homo sapiens. In samples F6-620 and AA7-738 identified mitochondrial haplogroup M, in samples WW7-240 and CC7-335 determined the mitochondrial haplogroup N, in sample CC7-2289 identified mitochondrial haplogroup R, in sample of BK-1653 identified mitochondrial haplogroup U8.

Three Initial Upper Paleolithic individuals (c. 44,000 to 40,000 years ago) from Bacho Kiro cave were each found to have relatively high levels of Neanderthal ancestry, with their genomes suggesting a recent Neanderthal ancestor in all three individuals perhaps six or seven generations back. In the single dispersal Out of Africa theory, it is believed that populations related to the Initial Upper Palaeolithic population of Bacho Kiro cave contributed ancestry to later Asian populations, because of genetic similarity and to some early West Europeans such as the c. 35,000 year old individual from the Goyet Caves, Belgium, known as 'GoyetQ116-1'. Populations related to these earlier individuals did not contribute detectable ancestry to later European populations. However in the multiple dispersal Out of Africa theory, East Asians are found to have a more distant split time from East African populations (73-88kya) compared to modern Europeans (57-76 kya) which could mean that the Bacho Kiro remains could be from a migration of anatomically modern humans from Asia. In 2022, a study determined that the IUP-affiliated Bacho Kiro remains were part of an Initial Upper Paleolithic wave (>45kya) "ascribed to a population movement with uniform genetic features and material culture" (Ancient East Eurasians), and sharing deep ancestry with other ancient specimens such as the Ust'-Ishim man and the Tianyuan man, as well as ancestors of modern day Papuans (Australasians). The Bacho Kiro population associated with the IUP material culture in Europe went extinct and replaced by the later Upper Paleolithic migration associated with West Eurasians (represented by the Kostenki-14 remains).

== See also ==
- Genetic studies on Serbs
- Genetic studies on Croats
- Genetic history of Europe
