= Tsenov =

Tsenov or Tzenov (Bulgarian: Ценов) is a Bulgarian masculine surname, its feminine counterpart is Tsenova or Tzenova. Notable people with the surname include:

- Bratan Tsenov (born 1964), Bulgarian wrestler
- Gancho Tsenov (1870–1949), Bulgarian scholar
- Julia Tsenova (1948–2010), Bulgarian composer and pianist
- Marin Tsenov (born 1980), Bulgarian football midfielder
- Mitko Tsenov (born 1993), Bulgarian middle-distance runner
