= Autochthonous theory about the origin of the Bulgarians =

Fringe theory

The autochthonous theory about the origin of the Bulgarians is an alternative to the official Bulgarian historiography, which dates chronologically from the 19th century.

== Emergence and development ==
During the early modern era, some Dalmatian pan-Slavic ideologists as Vinko Pribojević identified the Illyrians with the Early Slavs as the indigenous peoples of the Balkans. Another example was Mavro Orbini who believed the ancient Macedonians were also Early Slavs. Inspired by their ideas, the Bulgarian clergyman Spiridon Gabrovski completed in 1792 his "Short history of the Bulgarian Slavic people". Under these circumstances, he tried to legitimize the Bulgarians as "Illyrians", through Alexander the Great, presented entirely in a positive light. Alexander defeated the "Illyrian" king Perun, but included the Illyrians in his army and even gave to the two sons of Perun the power over Macedonia itself. It is not wondering that, drawing on the same arguments, some 19th century Bulgarian "revivalists" also claimed that the Ancient Macedonians were Bulgarian.

On the other hand, Georgi Rakovski, one of the leading Bulgarian national activists, coined in the 1860s under the nickname "Macedon" the theory, to that the Bulgarians were an autochthonous population on the Balkans, known to the ancient writers as Thracians. This historiographical concept was exposited scientifically for the first time in 1910 in the book "The Origin of the Bulgarians and the beginning of the Bulgarian state and the Bulgarian church" by the historian Gancho Tzenov. A fundamental tenet of the autochthonous theory is that the Bulgars that were actually Bulgarians are not settlers in Europe, but people who have inhabited the Balkans since antiquity. That is, they as a people, although they had different names in different historical epochs, are actually direct descendants of indigenous tribes such as Thracians, Illyrians, Macedones, Getae etc., who lived on the same territory.

This theory, though denied and rejected as a marginal one, has its supporters and theorists in its various variations today as Georgi Rakovski and Gancho Tsenov have been rediscovered. Their theories have been updated as an alternative to the accepted migration theories. One of them establishes a complete continuity between ancient Balkan populations and modern Bulgarians. Thracians are considered simply ancestors of the modern Bulgarians and their continuity is projected to the prehistoric times. Generally, proponents of Thracomania assume that the Thracians and Bulgarians are the same people, and that therefore the descended from the Thracians must be in fact Bulgarians. In another version of these hypotheses it is assumed that the Bulgars, who were Thracians, after a long journey from the Balkans to Azov sea and Crimea, have returned to their native homeland in the Early Middle Ages to free their Thracian brothers from the eastern Romans. Some modern Bulgarian researchers have attempted to prove the deception that the "Ezerovo ring" inscription, written with Greek letters in the Thracian language, is in fact in Slavic language, close to modern Bulgarian and that it was not the Greek alphabet, but the original script of the ancient Thracians.

For example, Georgi D. Sotirov wrote on historical topics related to ancient and paleo-Balkan history, supporting views similar to the modern ancient Macedonian narratives promoted by the Macedonian diaspora. In one paper, he argued that the Glagolitic script derived at least in part from Linear B. Such ideas found support among other amateur historians as professor Asen Chilingirov (culturologist), professor Yordan Tabov (mathematician), Nikolay Todorov (philologist), etc.

== See also ==
- Genetic studies on Bulgarians
- Bulgarian ethnogenesis
- Ancient Macedonism
- Dacianism
