= Yordan Tabov =

- Bulgarian: Йордан Табов
- Born: 1946 (age 79–80); Sofia, Bulgaria
- Occupation: mathematician

Yordan Tabov (born 1946 in Sofia) is a Bulgarian mathematician with academic Degrees: Doctor of Pedagogical Sciences (2007), PhD in Mathematics (MGU, Moscow, 1974); he is also recipient of The Paul Erdős Award (for significant contributions in mathematical education). His research interests include differential equations, geometry, didactics of mathematics, informatics and applications of mathematics and computer methods in the humanities; the focus of his research activity during the last 20 years was namely the last of the fields mentioned above.

Besides he is also an amateur historian and supports the fringe views on the autochthonous origin of the Bulgarian people, espousing ideas similar to those of Gancho Tsenov.

== Organisational activity ==
- Vice President of the International City Tournament (since 1990)
- Member of the World Federation of Mathematical Race Awards (1992–1996) and (2000–2008)
- Chairman of the Jury of the Chernorizets Hrabar Mathematical Tournament (since 1991)
- Head of Mathematics and Informatics Training at IMI-BAS (1991–2008)

=== Lecture ===
- Lectures at the Sofia University 1979–1989
- Lectures at New Bulgarian University 1993–2009
- Lectures at Burgas Free University 1995–2003

=== Participation in editorial choices ===
- Mathematics and Informatics (1984–2011);
- Indices of Mathematical Problems, Math Pro Press, USA (1994).
- Mathematics Competitions Enrichment Series, AICME, Australia (1993).
- Mathematics and Informatics Quarterly, SCT Publishing, Singapore (1991). (Editor-in-Chief 1991–2000)
- WENETS: Belogradchik Magazine for History, Culture and National Science. (2010)
