= George D. Sotiroff =

Georgi D. Sotirov
- Born: Georgi D. Sotirov; July 27, 1910; Sofia, Bulgaria
- Died: October 10, 1986; Quebec City, Canada
- Education: Doctor of Science
- Occupation(s): Historian, Philologist

George D. Sotiroff; (Bulgarian: Георги Д. Сотиров) was born on 27 July 1910 in the city of Sofia. He was a United Nations official and a Canadian settler of Bulgarian origin.

== Biography ==
Georgi Sotirov followed economics and law in Bulgaria, then emigrated to Switzerland where he married the Hungarian Irene Tordai. He studied history and international economic relations as a post-graduate student at the University of Geneva and then received a Ph.D. in Finance from the University of Friborg in 1943. After World War II, Sotirov remained in Switzerland where he worked at the International Red Cross and at the headquarters of the Organization of the United Nations in Geneva. Under the auspices of the UN, Sotirov has been sent from Geneva to the headquarters in New York. He then moved to Canada where he worked as an economist for the provincial governments of Saskatchewan and British Columbia, and later on in the field of public health. He also worked for the Royal Commission on Bilingualism and Biculturalism for several years, and in his later years he was visiting Professor of Linguistics at the University of Laval. Sotirov died on October 10, 1986, in Sainte-Foy, Quebec City.

Despite not being a historian, Sotirov wrote several books on historical themes related to ancient and paleo-Balkan history. His books are revisionist in character and have autochthonist inclinations, similar to the works of the controversial historian Gancho Tsenov, as Sotirov supports views similar to the ancient Macedonian narratives. In one paper, he argued that the Glagolitic script derived at least in part from Linear B.

== List of works ==
- „Убийството на Юстиниановата самоличност“ (1974) LYNN- ("The Murder of Justinian Identity" (1974) LYNN) http://www.ivanstamenov.com/files/gs-justinian.pdf
- „Elementa Nova Pro Historia Macedono-Bulgarica“ (1986), Канада (Canada)
- „Омирово ехо в съвременната трако – македонска топонимия “- ("Homeric Echo in Modern Thracian - Macedonian Toponymy")
- „Slavonic names in Greek and Roman antiquities“
- „Кому принадлежи Линеар Б“ ("Whom belongs Linear B")
