= OFK Čakajovce =

Slovak football club

- Full name: Obecný futbalový klub Čakajovce
- Nickname: Sovy (Owls)
- Founded: 1936; 90 years ago
- Ground: Štadión OFK Čakajovce, Čakajovce
- Capacity: 250
- Owner: Obecný futbalový klub Čakajovce o. z.
- Chairman: Filip Buday
- Manager: Jozef Paľo
- League: seventh tier
- 2025–26: 2nd of 16
- Website: https://www.cakajovce.sk/27627/futbalovy-klub-ofk-cakajovce
Home colours	Away colours

Obecný futbalový klub Čakajovce, commonly known as OFK Čakajovce, is a professional football club based in Čakajovce, near the city of Nitra. The club was founded in 1936 and plays its home matches at the Štadión OFK Čakajovce. In the 2026–27 season, the club will compete in the 7th tier of Slovak football. In the 2008–09 season, the football club won the III. A Class. In the 2017–18 season, the club won Group A of the 7th tier organised by the Nitra District Football Association (ObFZ Nitra).

== History ==
Between 1933 and 1937, sport, particularly football, began to develop in the village of Čakajovce. The football section was established in 1936. The club became more active in the 1950s. In the 1960s, the club was known as Telovýchovná jednota Družstevník Čakajovce, commonly referred to simply as Družstevník Čakajovce. In 1994, the club changed its name to FK STAVEX Čakajovce. On 4 September 2009, the club was officially renamed from FK STAVEX Čakajovce to Obecný futbalový klub Čakajovce, or OFK Čakajovce for short.

== Ground ==
View of the ground from the entrance gate.

The club plays its home games at Štadión OFK Čakajovce, located on the outskirts of Čakajovce. The ground has a capacity of 250 spectators and features a single main stand. The pitch measures 105 by 65 metres.
