= Asen Chilingirov =

Bulgarian art historian and culturologist

- Bulgarian: Асен Чилингиров
- Born: 1932; Sofia, Bulgaria
- Died: 2022 (aged 89–90); Berlin, Germany
- Occupations: philologist, culturologist
- Writing career
- Pen name: Asen Chilingiroff

Asen Chilingirov (1932–2022) was a Bulgarian art historian and culturologist.

== Life ==
He graduated with history of music and art history in Bulgaria. Since 1965, he has lived and work in Berlin, Germany. He graduated from "Art at Humboldt University (1967–1971). He worked as a research fellow at the Institute for the Protection of Cultural Monuments in Berlin (1971–1998). He is actively engaged in research, conducts numerous trips in Greece, Yugoslavia, Romania, West Germany, DDR, USSR, Switzerland, Italy and Albania. From 1973 to 1998 he read lectures on the history of Bulgarian art at Leipzig University and the Humboldt University in Berlin. He is the author of more than 500 scientific papers in the field of medieval history and fine arts. He is a member of the author's team at the publication of the 7-volume "Lexikon der Kunst", Leipzig 1971–1992, 5 editions) and the 11-volume Encyclopedia of Medieval Art (Encyclopedia dell'arte medievale), Rome, 1985–2000).

Chilingirov supports the fringe views on the autochthonous origin of the Bulgarian people, and espouses ideas similar to those of Gancho Tsenov.

== Selected works ==
"Изкуството на Българското средновековие" ("Die Kunst des christlichen Mittelalters in Bulgarien", 1979, C.H.Beck, Мюнхен и Union-Verlag, Берлин, З издания);

"България - Културна история " ("Bulgarien, Kulturgeschichte", Prisma-Verlag, Лайпциг, 2 издания: 1986 и 1987);
