= Čakajovce =

Village and municipality in Slovakia

Čakajovce Csekej
- Municipality
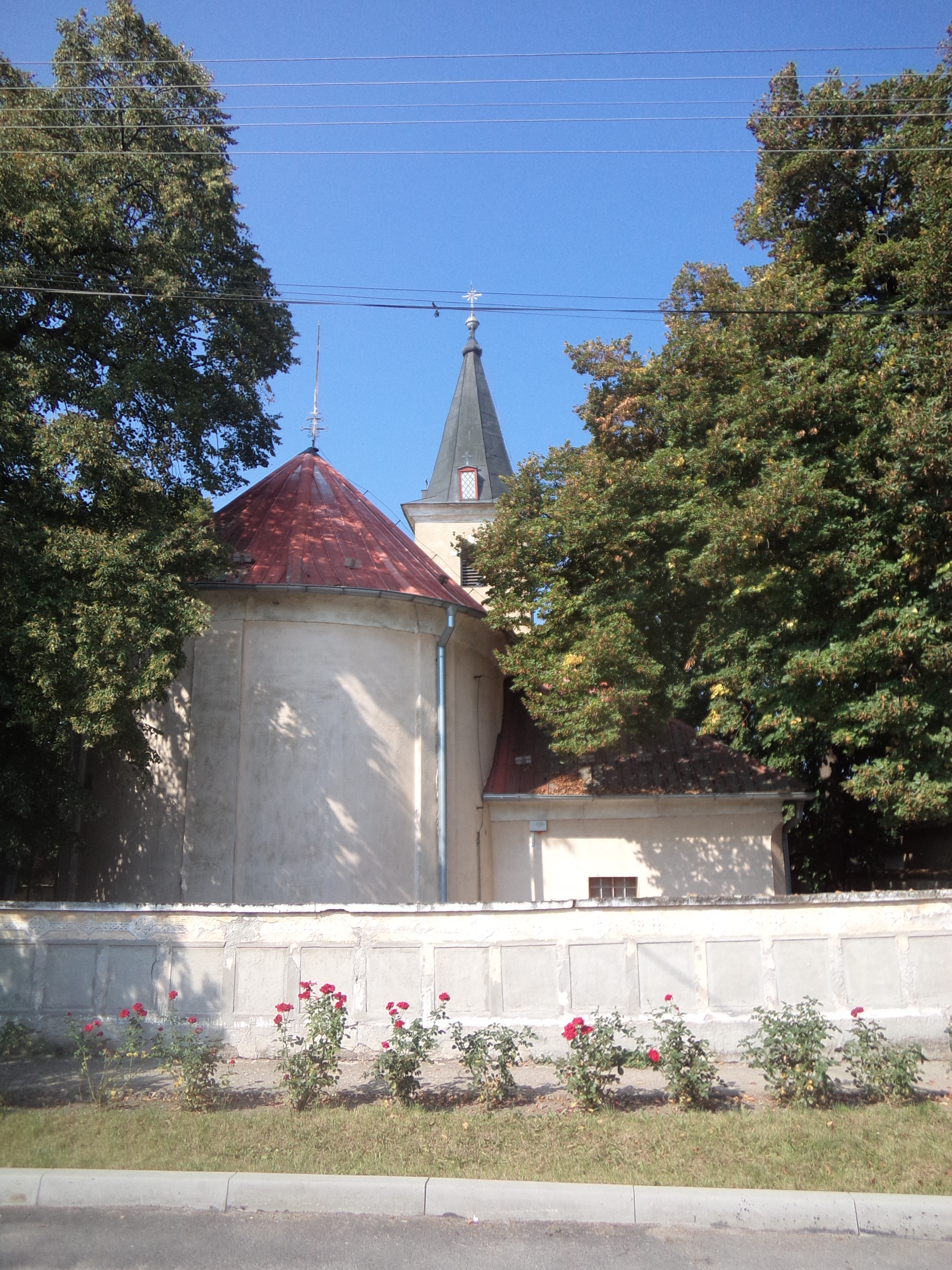

- Flag Coat of arms

- Location of Čakajovce in the Nitra Region Location of Čakajovce in Slovakia
- Coordinates: 48.37°N 18.03°E
- Country: Slovakia
- Region: Nitra Region
- District: Nitra District
- First mentioned: 1251

Area
  - Total: 5.77 km^{2} (2.23 sq mi)
- Elevation: 148 m (486 ft)

Population (2025)
  - Total: 1,158
- Time zone: UTC+1 (CET)
  - Summer (DST): UTC+2 (CEST)
- Postal code: 951 43
- Area code: +421 37
- Vehicle registration plate (until 2022): NR
- Website: www.cakajovce.sk

Čakajovce (Hungarian: Csekej) is a village and municipality in the Nitra District in western central Slovakia, in the Nitra Region.

== History ==
In historical records the village was first mentioned in 1251.

== Geography ==
The municipality lies at an altitude of 148 metres (486 ft) and covers an area of 5.77 km^{2} (2.23 sq mi) (2025).

== Population ==
Population statistic (10 years)
Year	1995	2005	2015	2025
Count	1091	1087	1153	1158
Difference		−0.36%	+6.07%	+0.43%

Population statistic
Year	2024	2025
Count	1156	1158
Difference		+0.17%

It has a population of 1158 people (31 December 2025).

=== Ethnicity ===
Census 2021 (1+ %)
Ethnicity	Number	Fraction
Slovak	1097	94.32%
Not found out	61	5.24%
Total	1163	

In year 2021 was 1163 people by ethnicity 1097 as Slovak, 61 as Not found out, 11 as Czech, 6 as Romani, 3 as Other, 2 as Russian, 2 as German, 2 as Hungarian, 1 as Vietnamese, 1 as Ukrainian and 1 as Polish.

Note on population: The difference values of population numbers in the table "Population statistic" and in the sections "Ethnicity" & "Religion" is caused by the use of various statistical methods.

=== Religion ===
Census 2021 (1+ %)
Religion	Number	Fraction
Roman Catholic Church	878	75.49%
None	189	16.25%
Not found out	55	4.73%
Evangelical Church	15	1.29%
Total	1163	

In year 2021 was 1163 people by religion 878 from Roman Catholic Church, 189 from None, 55 from Not found out, 15 from Evangelical Church, 11 from Christian Congregations in Slovakia, 5 from Greek Catholic Church, 5 from Ad hoc movements, 2 from Other and not ascertained christian church, 1 from Calvinist Church, 1 from Eastern Orthodox Church and 1 from Buddhism.

== Facilities ==
The village has a public library and football pitch. The village is home to the football club OFK Čakajovce. Also has two chambers and the Roman Catholic Church of St. Catherine

== See also ==
- List of municipalities and towns in Slovakia

== Genealogical resources ==
The records for genealogical research are available at the state archive "Statny Archiv in Nitra, Slovakia"

- Roman Catholic church records (births/marriages/deaths): 1747-1899 (parish B)
