= Blood type distribution by country =

This list concerns blood type distribution between countries and regions. Blood type (also called a blood group) is a classification of genes, based on the presence and absence of antibodies and inherited antigenic substances on the surface of red blood cells (RBCs). These antigens may be proteins, carbohydrates, glycoproteins, or glycolipids, depending on the blood group system.

== ABO and Rh distribution by country ==
ABO and Rh blood type distribution by country & dependency (population averages)
Country/Dependency	Population	O+	A+	B+	AB+	O−	A−	B−	AB−
Albania	3,107,100	34.1%	31.2%	14.5%	5.2%	6.0%	5.5%	2.6%	0.9%
Algeria	47,022,473	40.0%	30.0%	15.0%	4.25%	6.6%	2.3%	1.1%	0.75%
Argentina	46,994,384	50.34%	31.09%	8.20%	2.16%	4.29%	2.98%	0.74%	0.20%
Armenia	2,976,765	29.0%	46.3%	12.0%	5.6%	2.0%	3.7%	1.0%	0.4%
Australia	26,768,598	38.0%	32.0%	12.0%	4.0%	7.0%	6.0%	2.0%	1.0%
Austria	8,967,982	30.0%	37.0%	12.0%	5.0%	6.0%	7.0%	2.0%	0.45%
Azerbaijan	10,650,239	29.8%	30.0%	21.1%	9.0%	3.3%	3.4%	2.4%	1.0%
Bahrain	1,566,888	48.48%	15.35%	22.61%	3.67%	3.27%	1.33%	1.04%	0.25%
Bangladesh	168,697,184	29.21%	26.3%	33.12%	9.59%	0.53%	0.48%	0.6%	0.17%
Belarus	9,501,451	32.3%	30.6%	15.3%	6.8%	5.7%	5.4%	2.7%	1.2%
Belgium	11,977,634	38.0%	34.0%	8.5%	4.0%	7.0%	6.0%	1.5%	1.0%
Bhutan	884,546	38.15%	29.45%	23.86%	8.41%	0.06%	0.04%	0.04%	0.01%
Bolivia	12,311,974	51.53%	20.45%	10.11%	1.15%	4.39%	2.73%	0.54%	0.1%
Bosnia	3,798,671	31.0%	36.0%	12.0%	6.0%	5.0%	7.0%	2.0%	1.0%
Brazil	220,051,512	36.0%	34.0%	8.0%	2.5%	9.0%	8.0%	2.0%	0.5%
Bulgaria	6,782,659	28.0%	37.4%	12.8%	6.8%	5.0%	6.6%	2.2%	1.2%
Burkina Faso	23,042,199	39.94%	20.79%	26.34%	5.17%	3.36%	1.75%	2.22%	0.43%
Cambodia	17,063,669	46.7%	27.2%	18.5%	4.9%	1.3%	0.8%	0.5%	0.1%
Cameroon	30,966,105	46.83%	24.15%	21.06%	4.29%	1.79%	0.92%	0.8%	0.16%
Canada	38,794,813	39.0%	36.0%	7.6%	2.5%	7.0%	6.0%	1.4%	0.5%
Chile	18,664,652	55.01%	28.08%	8.02%	1.81%	4.19%	2.14%	0.61%	0.14%
Colombia	49,588,357	61.3%	21.11%	7.28%	1.47%	5.13%	2.7%	0.7%	0.31%
Costa Rica	5,265,575	49.7%	28.5%	12.4%	3.0%	3.4%	1.9%	0.9%	0.2%
Croatia	4,150,116	29.0%	36.0%	15.0%	5.0%	5.0%	6.0%	3.0%	1.0%
Cuba	10,966,038	45.8%	33.5%	10.2%	2.9%	3.6%	2.8%	1.0%	0.2%
Cyprus	1,320,525	35.22%	40.35%	11.11%	4.72%	3.85%	3.48%	0.87%	0.40%
Czech Republic	10,837,890	27.0%	36.0%	15.0%	7.0%	5.0%	6.0%	3.0%	1.0%
DRC	115,403,027	59.5%	21.3%	15.2%	2.4%	1.0%	0.3%	0.2%	0.1%
Denmark	5,973,136	35.0%	37.0%	8.0%	4.0%	6.0%	7.0%	2.0%	1.0%
Dominican Republic	10,815,857	47.2%	26.4%	16.9%	2.1%	3.7%	2.1%	1.4%	0.2%
Ecuador	18,309,984	75.0%	14.0%	7.1%	0.5%	2.38%	0.7%	0.3%	0.02%
Egypt	111,247,248	36.44%	33.94%	20.96%	8.65%	n/a	n/a	n/a	n/a
El Salvador	6,628,702	62.0%	23.0%	11.0%	1.0%	1.0%	1.0%	0.7%	0.3%
Estonia	1,344,232	29.5%	30.8%	20.7%	6.3%	4.3%	4.5%	3.0%	0.9%
Ethiopia	118,550,298	39.0%	28.0%	21.0%	5.0%	3.0%	2.0%	1.0%	1.0%
Fiji	951,611	43.0%	33.3%	16.5%	4.8%	1.0%	0.7%	0.5%	0.2%
Finland	5,626,414	28.0%	35.0%	16.0%	7.0%	5.0%	6.0%	2.0%	1.0%
France	68,374,591	36.5%	38.2%	7.7%	2.5%	6.5%	6.8%	1.4%	0.4%
Gabon	2,455,105	57.55%	20.52%	17.19%	2.54%	1.35%	0.48%	0.41%	0.06%
Georgia	4,900,961	34.8%	32.3%	11.9%	6.0%	6.2%	5.7%	2.1%	0.5%
Germany	84,119,100	35.0%	37.0%	9.0%	4.0%	6.0%	6.0%	2.0%	1.0%
Ghana	34,589,092	53.8%	17.6%	18.3%	2.8%	4.5%	1.3%	1.3%	0.2%
Greece	10,461,091	37.8%	32.2%	11.0%	4.0%	6.6%	5.7%	2.0%	0.7%
Guinea	13,986,179	46.88%	21.64%	22.86%	4.52%	2.0%	0.9%	1.0%	0.2%
Honduras	9,529,188	57.5%	25.0%	7.8%	2.5%	2.7%	1.7%	0.6%	0.2%
Hong Kong	7,297,821	42.8%	25.5%	25.8%	5.9%	0.7%	0.1%	0.2%	0.1%
Hungary	9,855,745	27.0%	33.0%	16.0%	8.0%	5.0%	7.0%	3.0%	1.0%
Iceland	364,036	47.6%	27.2%	9.0%	2.0%	8.4%	4.8%	1.6%	0.4%
India	1,409,128,296	32.53%	21.80%	32.10%	7.70%	2.03%	1.36%	2.00%	0.48%
Indonesia	281,562,465	36.82%	25.87%	28.85%	7.96%	0.18%	0.13%	0.15%	0.04%
Iran	88,386,937	36.5%	27.0%	22.2%	4.0%	5.0%	2.0%	2.5%	0.8%
Iraq	42,083,436	32.1%	25.0%	25.6%	7.4%	3.6%	2.7%	2.7%	0.9%
Ireland	5,233,461	47.0%	26.0%	9.0%	2.0%	8.0%	5.0%	2.0%	1.0%
Israel	9,402,617	32.0%	34.0%	17.0%	7.0%	3.0%	4.0%	2.0%	1.0%
Italy	60,964,931	39.0%	36.0%	7.5%	2.5%	7.0%	6.0%	1.5%	0.5%
Ivory Coast	29,981,758	47.24%	20.19%	21.7%	3.82%	3.73%	1.54%	1.48%	0.3%
Jamaica	2,823,713	51.1%	20.0%	20.0%	1.9%	3.5%	2.0%	1.0%	0.5%
Japan	123,201,945	29.9%	39.8%	19.9%	9.9%	0.15%	0.2%	0.1%	0.05%
Jordan	11,174,024	33.03%	32.86%	16.56%	6.28%	4.4%	3.97%	2.06%	0.04%
Kazakhstan	20,260,006	30.7%	29.8%	24.2%	8.3%	2.3%	2.2%	1.8%	0.4%
Kenya	58,246,378	45.6%	25.2%	21.28%	4.2%	1.8%	1.0%	0.9%	0.02%
Laos	7,953,556	37.52%	19.73%	35.36%	6.85%	0.2%	0.1%	0.2%	0.05%
Latvia	1,853,559	30.6%	31.0%	17.0%	6.0%	5.4%	6.0%	3.0%	1.0%
Lebanon	5,364,482	38.4%	32.3%	9.5%	3.2%	7.7%	6.5%	1.7%	0.7%
Libya	7,361,263	42.64%	20.86%	11.19%	4.5%	7.26%	3.24%	1.64%	0.67%
Liechtenstein	40,272	34.0%	37.0%	10.0%	4.0%	6.0%	6.5%	1.8%	0.7%
Lithuania	2,830,144	36.0%	33.0%	11.0%	4.0%	7.0%	6.0%	2.0%	0.7%
Luxembourg	671,254	35.0%	37.0%	9.0%	4.0%	6.0%	6.0%	2.0%	1.0%
Macao	644,426	41.5%	26.1%	25.4%	6.3%	0.33%	0.09%	0.17%	0.05%
Malaysia	34,564,810	34.32%	30.35%	27.37%	7.46%	0.17%	0.15%	0.14%	0.04%
Malta	469,730	38.0%	41.0%	7.0%	3.0%	5.0%	4.5%	1.0%	0.5%
Mauritania	4,328,040	46.3%	26.68%	17.47%	3.85%	2.8%	1.6%	1.1%	0.2%
Mauritius	1,310,504	38.3%	26.0%	25.0%	6.7%	1.7%	1.0%	1.0%	0.3%
Mexico	130,739,927	59.09%	26.23%	8.53%	1.73%	2.73%	1.21%	0.40%	0.08%
Moldova	3,599,528	28.5%	31.8%	17.6%	7.0%	5.0%	6.0%	3.0%	1.1%
Mongolia	3,281,676	37.66%	22.89%	29.93%	7.83%	0.34%	0.21%	0.27%	0.01%
Morocco	37,387,585	42.3%	30.8%	14.0%	4.0%	4.5%	3.1%	1.5%	0.4%
Myanmar	57,527,139	35.7%	23.8%	32.7%	6.95%	0.3%	0.2%	0.3%	0.05%
Namibia	2,803,660	50.58%	20.49%	20.21%	1.02%	4.22%	1.71%	1.69%	0.08%
Nepal	31,122,387	35.2%	36.3%	27.1%	2.6%	0.3%	0.2%	0.2%	0.1%
Netherlands	17,772,378	38.2%	36.6%	7.7%	2.5%	6.8%	6.4%	1.3%	0.5%
New Zealand	5,161,211	38.0%	32.0%	10.0%	3.0%	9.0%	6.0%	1.0%	<1.0%
Nicaragua	6,676,948	62.0%	20.0%	11.0%	4.0%	1.0%	1.0%	0.7%	0.3%
Nigeria	236,747,130	50.23%	21.61%	19.59%	3.47%	2.7%	1.16%	1.05%	0.19%
North Korea	26,298,666	27.15%	31.08%	30.15%	11.32%	0.08%	0.1%	0.1%	0.03%
North Macedonia	2,135,622	30.0%	34.0%	15.0%	6.0%	5.0%	6.0%	3.0%	1.0%
Norway	5,509,733	33.2%	41.6%	6.8%	3.4%	5.8%	7.4%	1.2%	0.6%
Oman	3,901,992	44.9%	17.4%	20.2%	6.8%	7.4%	0.6%	2.7%	n/a
Pakistan	252,363,571	30.04%	21.53%	30.24%	8.83%	3.1%	2.22%	3.13%	0.91%
Papua New Guinea	10,046,233	55.7%	32.2%	9.6%	2.1%	1.8%	0.5%	0.2%	0.1%
Paraguay	7,522,549	63.07%	21.32%	4.72%	1.38%	5.89%	2.97%	0.49%	0.15%
Peru	32,600,249	70.0%	18.4%	7.8%	1.6%	1.4%	0.5%	0.28%	0.02%
Philippines	118,277,063	45.9%	22.9%	24.9%	5.97%	0.1%	0.1%	0.1%	0.03%
Poland	38,140,910	31.0%	32.0%	15.0%	7.0%	6.0%	6.0%	2.0%	1.0%
Portugal	10,207,177	36.2%	39.8%	6.6%	2.9%	6.1%	6.8%	1.1%	0.5%
China	1,416,043,270	34.0%	27.6%	28.9%	8.4%	0.4%	0.25%	0.2%	0.15%
Romania	18,148,155	28.0%	37.0%	14.0%	7.0%	5.0%	6.0%	2.0%	1.0%
Russia	140,820,810	36.0%	31.0%	19.0%	2.1%	6.0%	4.0%	1.0%	0.9%
Saudi Arabia	36,544,431	47.8%	16.0%	17.9%	4.0%	4.0%	2.0%	1.0%	0.3%
Serbia	6,652,212	31.92%	35.28%	12.6%	4.2%	6.08%	6.72%	2.4%	0.8%
Singapore	6,028,459	44.7%	23.9%	24.5%	5.6%	0.6%	0.3%	0.3%	0.1%
Slovakia	5,563,649	27.2%	35.7%	15.3%	6.8%	4.8%	6.3%	2.7%	1.2%
Slovenia	2,097,893	31.0%	33.0%	12.0%	6.0%	7.0%	7.0%	3.0%	1.0%
Somalia	13,017,273	52.8%	19.36%	12.32%	3.52%	7.2%	2.64%	1.68%	0.48%
South Africa	60,442,647	39.0%	32.0%	12.0%	3.0%	6.0%	5.0%	2.0%	1.0%
South Korea	52,081,799	27.4%	34.0%	26.7%	11.5%	0.1%	0.1%	0.1%	0.00%
Spain	47,280,433	35.0%	36.0%	8.0%	2.5%	9.0%	7.0%	2.0%	0.5%
Sri Lanka	21,982,608	43.42%	21.0%	25.78%	5.13%	2.12%	1.04%	1.25%	0.26%
Sudan	50,467,278	48.0%	27.7%	15.2%	2.3%	3.5%	1.8%	0.8%	0.2%
Sweden	10,589,835	32.0%	37.0%	10.0%	5.0%	6.0%	7.0%	2.0%	1.0%
Switzerland	8,860,574	35.0%	38.0%	8.0%	4.0%	6.0%	7.0%	1.0%	1.0%
Syria	23,865,423	43.0%	30.0%	14.0%	3.7%	5.0%	3.0%	1.0%	0.3%
Taiwan	23,595,274	43.9%	25.9%	23.9%	6.0%	0.28%	0.01%	0.01%	0.01%
Thailand	69,920,998	40.8%	16.9%	36.8%	4.97%	0.2%	0.1%	0.2%	0.03%
Tunisia	12,048,847	41.86%	28.21%	16.38%	4.55%	4.14%	2.79%	1.62%	0.45%
Turkey	84,119,531	29.4%	38.3%	13.2%	6.4%	4.4%	5.5%	2.1%	0.7%
Uganda	49,283,041	49.29%	24.11%	20.29%	4.41%	1.01%	0.49%	0.41%	0.09%
Ukraine	35,661,826	32.0%	34.0%	15.0%	5.0%	5.0%	6.0%	2.0%	1.0%
United Arab Emirates	10,032,213	44.1%	21.9%	20.9%	4.3%	4.3%	2.1%	2.0%	0.4%
United Kingdom	68,459,055	36%	30%	8%	2%	8%	9%	2%	1%
United States	341,963,408	37.4%	35.7%	8.5%	3.4%	6.6%	6.3%	1.5%	0.6%
Uzbekistan	36,520,593	29.42%	30.93%	24.98%	9.27%	1.68%	1.77%	1.42%	0.53%
Venezuela	31,250,306	58.3%	28.2%	5.6%	1.9%	4.0%	1.5%	0.4%	0.1%
Vietnam	105,758,975	41.7%	20.9%	30.8%	4.98%	0.3%	0.1%	0.2%	0.02%
Yemen	32,140,443	47.84%	27.5%	15.32%	2.14%	3.66%	2.1%	1.17%	0.16%
Zimbabwe	17,150,352	45.7%	28.8%	18.0%	4.1%	1.7%	1.0%	0.4%	0.3%
World	8,057,236,243	38.4%	27.3%	8.1%	2.0%	13.1%	8.1%	2.0%	0.01%

50.0% and above 40.0–49.9% 30.0–39.9% 20.0–29.9% 10.0–19.9% 5.0–9.9% less than 5.0%

Ethnic distribution of ABO (without Rh) blood types (This table has more entries than the table above but does not distinguish between Rh types.)
People group	O (%)	A (%)	B (%)	AB (%)
Australian Aboriginals	61	39	0	0
Abyssinians	43	27	25	5
Ainu (Japan)	17	32	32	18
Albanians	38	43	13	6
Great Andamanese	9	60	20	12
Arabs	34	31	29	6
Armenians	31	50	13	6
Asian Americans	40	28	27	5
Austrians	36	44	13	6
Bantus	46	30	19	5
Basques	51	44	4	1
Belgians	47	42	8	3
Bororo (Brazil)	100	0	0	0
Brazilians	47	41	9	3
Bulgarians	32	44	15	8
Bamar people	36	24	33	7
Buryats (Siberia)	33	21	38	8
Bushmen	56	34	9	2
Chinese-Canton	47	23	25	4
Chinese-Ningbo	35	32	25	9
Chinese-Yangzhou	31	32	27	7
Chinese-Peking	29	27	32	13
Chuvash	30	29	33	7
Croats	34	42	17	7
Czechs	30	44	18	9
Danes	41	44	11	4
Dutch	45	43	9	3
Egyptians	33	36	24	8
English	47	41	9	3
Inuit (Alaska)	38	44	13	5
Inuit (Greenland)	57	36	23	5
Estonians	34	36	23	8
Fijians	44	34	17	6
Finns	34	41	18	7
French	43	47	7	3
Georgians	46	37	12	4
Germans	41	43	11	5
Greeks	44	38	14	5
Romani people (Hungary)	29	27	35	10
Hawaiians	37	61	2	1
Hindus (Bombay)	32	29	28	11
Hungarians	36	43	19	8
Icelanders	56	32	10	3
Indians (India)	37	22	33	7
Native Americans (US)	79	16	4	1
Irish	52	35	10	1
Italians (Milan)	46	41	11	3
Japanese	30	38	22	10
Jews (Germany)	42	41	12	5
Jews (Poland)	33	41	18	8
Kalmyks	26	23	41	11
Kikuyu (Kenya)	60	19	20	1
Koreans	28	32	31	9
Kurds	37	32	23	6
Sami people	29	63	4	4
Latvians	32	37	24	7
Lithuanians	40	34	20	6
Malays	62	18	20	0
Māori	46	54	1	0
Mayans	98	1	1	1
Moros	64	16	20	0
Navajo Indians	73	27	0	0
Nicobarese	74	9	15	1
Norwegians	39	50	8	4
Papuans (New Guinea)	41	27	23	9
Persians	38	33	22	7
Peruvian Indians	100	0	0	0
Filipinos	45	22	27	6
Poles	33	39	20	9
Portuguese	35	53	8	4
Romanians	33	43	16	8
Russians	33	36	23	8
Sardinians	50	26	19	5
Scots	51	34	12	3
Serbs	38	42	16	5
Shompen Nicobarese	100	0	0	0
Slovaks	37	42	16	5
South Africans	45	40	11	4
Spanish	38	47	10	5
Sudanese	62	16	21	0
Swedish	36	45	12	7
Swiss	38	50	9	3
Tatars	28	30	29	13
Thais	32	21	36	9
Turks	43	33	19	6
Ukrainians	37	40	18	6
African Americans	49	27	20	4
White Americans	45	40	11	4
Vietnamese	42	22	30	5

Blood group B has its highest frequency in the Middle East, where it ranks as the largest share of the population. In Southeast Asia its share of the population is lowest, especially in Indonesia, secondarily in East Asia, Northern Asia and neighboring Central Asia, and its incidence diminishes both towards the east and the west, falling to single-digit percentages in Netherlands, Norway, Portugal and Switzerland. It is believed to have been entirely absent from Native American and Australian Aboriginal populations prior to the arrival of Europeans in those areas.

Blood group A is associated with high frequencies in Europe, especially in Scandinavia and Central Europe, although its highest frequencies occur in some Australian Aboriginal populations and the Blackfoot Indians of Montana, US.

== Maps of ABO alleles among native populations ==
In the ABO blood group system, there are three alleles: i, I^{A}, and I^{B}. As both I^{A} and I^{B} are dominant over i, only ii people have type O blood. Individuals with I^{A}I^{A} or I^{A}i have type A blood, and individuals with I^{B}I^{B} or I^{B}i have type B. Those with I^{A}I^{B} have type AB.

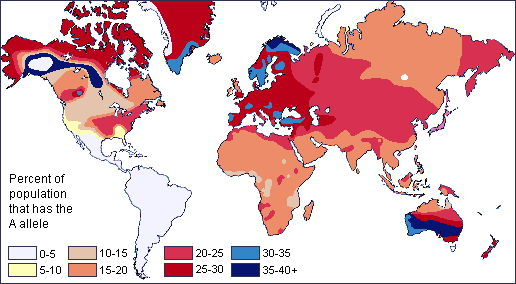
Map of allele I^{A}
among native populations

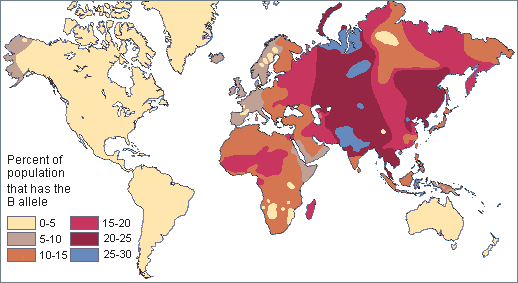
Map of allele I^{B}
among native populations

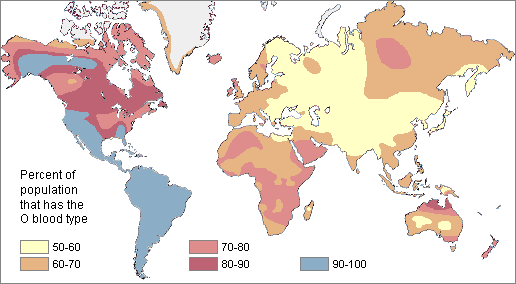
Map of blood group O
among native populations

== See also ==
- ABO blood group system
- Blood type
