= Gancho Tsenov =

Bulgarian history scholar

Gancho Tsenov (Gancho Tzenoff)
- Ганчо Ценов
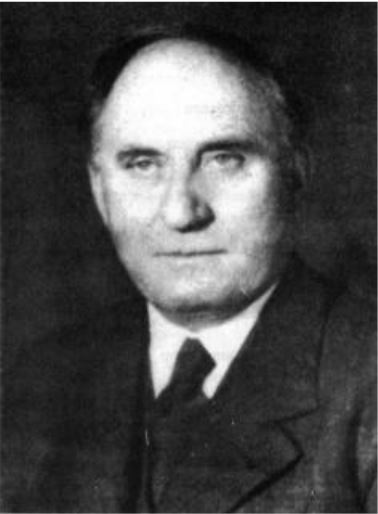
- Tsenov, c. 1935
- Born: 6 June 1870; Boynitsa, Ottoman Empire
- Died: 1949 (aged 78–79); West Berlin, West Germany
- Occupations: Teacher, historian, philologist

Gancho Tsenov (Bulgarian: Ганчо Ценов) (1870–1949) was a Bulgarian scholar who worked mainly in the field of Bulgarian history. He is considered to be the founder of the fringe theory on the autochthonous origin of the Bulgarian people, exhibited for the first time in a comprehensive form in 1910 in his capital work "The Origins of Bulgarians and the Origin of the Bulgarian State and the Bulgarian Church". Gancho Tsenov was translating sources from Bulgarian, German, Latin, Greek, Hebrew, Hungarian, Polish and Russian.

== Life ==
Gancho Tsenov was born on June 6, 1870, in the Boynitsa village, Sanjak of Vidin, Ottoman Empire (today in Bulgaria). He graduated in 1894 at the Sofia University. After 2 years he became a history teacher at the Male High School in Vidin. He worked in the Cultural Department of the Military Ministry.

From there in 1899 he was sent a 4-year specialization competition at the Humboldt University in Berlin, Germany. There he defended a dissertation on Russian history on "Who set fire to Moscow in 1812 (Napoleon's invasion of Russia in 1812) and became the first Bulgarian doctor at German university, then began work on the subject "Origin and history of the Bulgarian people.The most important part of his dissertation was published in the Historic series.

His revisionist ideas were not welcomed by academic circles in Bulgaria and his application to Associate Professor at Sofia University was dismissed. Therefore, Tsenov went back to Germany where he became a lecturer in Ancient history at Humboldt University. Basic writings of Tsenov were issued in Germany and in Bulgaria. At the same time in Bulgaria criticism against him continued. In 1936 Tsenov applied again for Professor at the Department of History at Sofia University, but his candidacy was rejected for a second time and he moved to Germany again. After the communist coup from 1944 in Bulgaria, Tsenov, who was married to German wife left in West Berlin until his death.

=== Controversy ===
Tsenov's theory constitutes a full revision of the official Bulgarian historiography rejecting the migration of the Bulgars from Central Asia into Europe. Part of Tzenov's ideas are that the Bulgars were ancient Thraco-Illyrians, and not a Turkic people, as well, he denied their Volga residence. Those statements fit entirely in the context of the Balkan nationalisms of the early 20th century. He maintained Kubrat also bore a Slavic name, whence came the name of the Croats, Justinian I was a Bulgarian himself, and so was also Belisarius. Tsenov maintained that Alexander the Great is descended from that people, who today are called Bulgarians. His theory revealed that the Slavic-speaking Bulgarians are native in the Balkans, and that the ancient Balkan populations were Bulgarian. In this way, Tsenov imposed the deceptive idea, Bulgarian nation is one of the oldest, with unbroken continuity from the antiquity to the modern times. Tsenov's views were not accepted by the official Bulgarian historiography, where he was a subject of sharp criticism. His application for Professor at Sofia University was twice dismissed. He continued defending his extreme views and affiliated with the Nazi regime. After WWII Tsenov was condemned as fascists by the Bulgarian communist regime and his books were banned. His ethnogenetic conceptions are classified today as groundless fringe theory. Some present-day researchers make a parallel between Tsenov's theses and the Antiquisation of the modern Macedonian historiography. His writings are popular today on some Bulgarian Web sites, nationalist forums and the like.

His ideas find support among some amateur historians as PhD. Georgi Sotirov (financier), professor Asen Chilingirov (culturologist), professor Yordan Tabov (mathematician), PhD. Nikolay Todorov (philologist).

== Selected works ==
"Wer hat Moskau im Jahre 1812 in Brand gesteckt?", Gancho Tsenov. - Nachdr. d. Ausg, Historische Studien No.17, E. Ebering, Berlin 1900. - Vaduz: Kraus Reprint, 1965

"Goten oder Bulgaren: quellenkritische Untersuchung über die Geschichte der alten Skythen, Thrakier und Makedonier", Ganco Cenov - Leipzig: Dyk, 1915 https://archive.org/details/gotenoderbulgare00tsen

"Geschichte der Bulgaren", Steiwetz, Berlin, 1917

"Das wissenschaftliche Leben in Bulgarien", статия, "Minerva" (WdeG), Berlin, 6 Sept., 1924.

"Geschichte der Bulgaren und der anderen Südslaven von der römischen Eroberung der Balkanhalbinsel bis zum Ende des neunten Jahrhunderts", Dr. Gancho Tsenov, Berlin/Leipzig, Walter De Gruyter & Co., 1935

== See also ==
- Bulgarian nationalism
- Protochronism
- Ancient Macedonism
